= List of Man'yōshū poets =

The Man'yōshū is an anthology of Japanese waka poetry. It was compiled in the eighth century (during Japan's Nara period), likely in a number of stages by several people, with the final touches likely being made by Ōtomo no Yakamochi, the poet whose work is most prominently featured in the anthology. The Man'yōshū is the oldest anthology of poetry in classical Japanese, as well as the largest, with over 4,500 poems included, (Note: The precise number of poems is a matter of dispute. The Kokka Taikan gives a figure of 4,516, but this includes several duplicate poems and arbitrarily includes or leaves out poems in variant texts. The scholar Yūkichi Takeda, on analysis of these problems, gave 4,506 as the number of poems. The total number of variant poems, poems duplicated from the Kojiki, poems included in certain texts of the Man'yōshū, etc. which Takeda left out is given by Nakanishi, in his entry in the Nihon Koten Bungaku Daijiten on the number of poems in the Man'yōshū, as 70.) and is widely regarded as the finest. The collection is distinguished from later anthologies of classical Japanese poetry not only by its size but by its variety of poetic forms, as it includes not only the 5-7-5-7-7 tanka form, which by the time of the Kokin Wakashū had become ubiquitous, but also the longer chōka form (which included an indefinite number of 5-7 verses and ended with 5-7-7), the 5-7-7-5-7-7 sedōka and the 5-7-5-7-7-7 bussokusekika. The poets also came from a wide variety of social classes, from members of the imperial family and courtiers to frontier guards and commoners in the eastern provinces (ja), while later anthologies would be limited to works composed by those of the upper classes.

The vast majority of the poems of the Man'yōshū were composed over a period of roughly a century, (Note: A small number of poems are attributed to figures from the ancient past, such as Emperor Yūryaku.) with scholars dividing them into four "periods". Princess Nukata's poetry is included in that of the first period (645–672), while the second period (673–701) is represented by the poetry of Kakinomoto no Hitomaro, generally regarded as the greatest of Man'yōshū poets and one of the most important poets in Japanese history. The third period (702–729) includes the poems of Takechi no Kurohito, whom Donald Keene called "[t]he only new poet of importance" of the early part of this period, when Fujiwara no Fuhito promoted the composition of kanshi (poetry in classical Chinese). Other "third period" poets include: Yamabe no Akahito, a poet who was once paired with Hitomaro but whose reputation has suffered in modern times; Takahashi no Mushimaro, one of the last great chōka poets, who recorded a number of Japanese legends such as that of Ura no Shimako; and Kasa no Kanamura, a high-ranking courtier who also composed chōka but not as well as Hitomaro or Mushimaro. But the most prominent and important poets of the third period were Ōtomo no Tabito, Yakamochi's father and the head of a poetic circle in the Dazaifu, and Tabito's friend Yamanoue no Okura, possibly an immigrant from the Korean kingdom of Paekche, whose poetry is highly idiosyncratic in both its language and subject matter and has been highly praised in modern times. Yakamochi himself was a poet of the fourth period (730–759), and according to Keene he "dominated" this period. He composed the last dated poem of the anthology in 759.

Numbers given in the following list are those used in the Kokka Taikan (KKTK). The Japanese text follows Susumu Nakanishi's Man'yōshū Jiten and includes the poets' kabane where applicable, with italic romanizations included where the Japanese text differs from the proper names at the start of each entry. Italicized numbers indicate traditional attribution given as such in the Man'yōshū itself. (Man'yōshū poems that were attributed to these poets by later works are not listed.) "Poet" names in parentheses indicate that the name is not that of a human poet but that of an earlier collection from which the Man'yōshū took the poems; such works are listed separately, immediately below the entry on the poet with whom they are associated, following Nakanishi. Square brackets indicate poems' numbers according to the Kan'ei-bon text of the Man'yōshū, rather than the KKTK. "Anonymous" poems such as those attributed to "a man" or "a girl" are included when Nakanishi lists them under those "names".

== List ==
Man'yōshū poets
Name	Name (Japanese)	Japanese name reading (where applicable)	Poems (KKTK number)	Notes	Reference(s)
Abe no Hironiwa	安倍朝臣広庭	Abe no Asomi Hironiwa	302, 370, 975, 1423		
Abe no Iratsume	阿倍女郎		269, 505–506, 514, 516		
Abe no Kooji	安倍朝臣子祖父	Abe no Asomi Ko-oji	3838–3839		
Abe no Maetsukimi	阿倍大夫		1772	May have been the same person as Hironiwa.	
Abe no Mushimaro	安倍朝臣虫麿	Abe no Asomi Mushimaro	665, 672, 980, 1577–1578, 1650		
Abe no Okimichi	安倍朝臣奥道	Abe no Asomi Okimichi	1642		
Abe no Okina	阿倍朝臣老人	Abe no Asomi Okina	4247		
Abe no Samimaro	安倍朝臣沙弥麿 or 阿倍朝臣佐美麻呂	Abe no Asomi Samimaro	4433		
Abe no Toyotsugu	安倍朝臣豊継	Abe no Asomi Toyotsugu	1002		
Abe no Tsugimaro	阿倍朝臣継麿	Abe no Asomi Tsugimaro	3656, 3668, 3700, 3706, 3708		
Agata no Inukai no Hitogami	県犬養宿禰人上	Agata no Inukai no Sukune Hitogami	459	Also read Agata no Inukai no Hitokami.	
Agata no Inukai no Michiyo	県犬養橘宿禰三千代	Agata no Inukai no Tachibana no Sukune Michiyo	4235	According to the Shinsen Shōjiroku and Sonpi Bunmyaku, she was the daughter of Azumahito (東人). She was also the mother of Prince Katsuragi (葛城王, later Tachibana no Moroe), Prince Sai (佐為王, later Tachibana no Sai, Princess Muro and Empress Kōmyō.)	
Agata no Inukai no Mochio	県犬養宿禰持男	Agata no Inukai no Sukune Mochio	1586	Possibly the younger brother of Yoshio, based on the ordering of their poems. Possibly also connected to Ōtomo no Fumimochi in some way.	
Agata no Inukai no Otome	県犬養娘子		1586	Based on the placement of her poem, she apparently had some interaction with Ōtomo no Sakanoe no Iratsume.	
Agata no Inukai no Yoshio	県犬養宿禰吉男	Agata no Inukai no Sukune Yoshio	1585	Family name Agata no Inukai also written 県犬甘 in the Shōsōin texts.	
Prince Aki	安貴王	Aki-no-ōkimi	306, 534–535, 1555		
Aki no Osa no Obitomaro	商長首麿		4344		
Ama	尼		1635		
Ama no Inukai no Okamaro	海犬養宿禰岡麿	Ama no Inukai no Sukune Okamaro	996		
Amu no Kimimorotachi	奄君諸立		1483		
Prince Arima	有間皇子	Arima-no-miko	141–142		
Asada no Yasu	麻田連陽春	Asada no Muraji Yasu	569–570, 884–885		
Asakura no Masuhito	朝倉益人		4405		
Ashi no Okishima	阿氏奥島		824	Also read A-uji no Okishima.	
Prince Asukabe	安宿王	Asukabe-no-ōkimi	4301, 4451		
Asukabe no Kiminatomaro	安宿公奈登麿		4472		
Ato no Tobira no Otome	安都扉娘子		710		
Ato no Toshitari	安都宿禰年足	Ato no Sukune Toshitari	663		
Prince Atsumi	厚見王	Atsumi-no-ōkimi	668, 1435, 1458		
Princess Awata	粟田女王	Awata-no-ōkimi	4060		
Awata no Daibu	粟田大夫		817		
Awata Me no Otome	粟田女娘子		707–708		
Aya no Umakai	文忌寸馬養	Aya no Imiki Umakai	1579–1580		
Prince Chinu	智奴王	Chinu-no-ōkimi	4275		
Chōshi no Fukushi	張氏福子		829		
Denshi no Makami	田氏真上		839		
Denshi no Umahito	田氏肥人		834		
E no Tami	伇民		50		
Egyō	恵行		4204		
Endachi	縁達師	Endachi-hōshi	1538		
Prince Enoi	榎井王	Enoi-no-ōkimi	1015		
Fujii no Muraji	藤井連		1779		
Fujii no Hironari	葛井連広成	Fujii no Muraji Hironari	962		
Fujii no Kooyu	葛井連子老	Fujii no Muraji Kooyu	3691–3693		
Fujii no Moroai	葛井連諸会	Fujii no Muraji Moroai	3925		
Fujii no Ōnari	葛井連大成	Fujii no Muraji Ōnari	576, 820, 1003		
Fujiwara no Bunin (i)	藤原夫人		104, 1465	Literally "a lady of Fujiwara", apparently a different person from (ii) below. Daughter of Kamatari, consort of Emperor Tenmu, and younger sister of Hikami no Iratsume.	
Fujiwara no Bunin (ii)	藤原夫人		4479	Literally "a lady of Fujiwara", apparently a different person from (i) above. Real name 氷上娘 Hikami no Iratsume. Daughter of Kamatari, consort of Emperor Tenmu.	
Fujiwara no Fusasaki	藤原朝臣房前	Fujiwara no Asomi Fusasaki	812		
Fujiwara no Hirotsugu	藤原朝臣広嗣	Fujiwara no Asomi Hirotsugu	1456		
Fujiwara no Iratsume	藤原郎女		766		
Fujiwara no Kamatari	藤原朝臣鎌足	Fujiwara no Asomi Kamatari	94, 95		
Fujiwara no Kiyokawa	藤原朝臣清河	Fujiwara no Asomi Kiyokawa	4241, 4244		
Fujiwara no Kusumaro	藤原朝臣久須麿	Fujiwara no Asomi Kusumaro	791–792		
Fujiwara no Maetsukimi	藤原卿		1218–1222, 1194–1195	Literally "the Fujiwara minister"; not a name but a title used in various places in the collection, sometimes clearly referring to Kamatari or Nakamaro, but in two spots uncertain, possibly referring to either Fusasaki or Maro, or to another unknown individual.	
Fujiwara no Maro	藤原朝臣麿	Fujiwara no Asomi Maro	522–524		
Fujiwara no Nagate	藤原朝臣永手	Fujiwara no Asomi Nagate	4277		
Fujiwara no Nakamaro	藤原朝臣仲麿	Fujiwara no Asomi Nakamaro	4242, 4487		
Fujiwara no Toriyumi	藤原朝臣執弓	Fujiwara no Asomi Toriyumi	4482		
Fujiwara no Umakai	藤原朝臣宇合	Fujiwara no Asomi Umakai	72, 312, 1535, 1729–1731		
Fujiwara no Yatsuka	藤原朝臣八束	Fujiwara no Asomi Yatsuka	398–399, 987, 1547, 1570–1571, 4271, 4276		
Fujiwarabe no Tomomaro	藤原部等母麿		4423		
Fuki no Toji	吹芡刀自	Possibly also read Fubuki no Toji; the Genryaku-bon (元暦本) has 吹黄 read as Fuki, with 吹芡 coming from the Kanazawa-bon and others	22, 490–491	Toji is not a name but refers to the mother of a particular household.	
Prince Funa	船王	Funa-no-ōkimi	998, 4257, 4279, 4449		
Prince Funado	道祖王	Funado-no-ōkimi	4284		
Furu no Tamuke	振田向宿禰	Furu no Tamuke no Sukune	1766		
Gannin	元仁		1720–1722		
Empress Genmei	元明天皇	Genmei-tennō	35, 76, possibly 78		
Empress Genshō	元正天皇	Genshō-tennō	[973–974, 1009,] 1637, 4057–4058, 4293, 4437		
Gishi no Norimaro	礒氏法麿		836		
Go no Dan'otsu no Tsuma	碁檀越妻		500		
Goshi	碁師		1732–1733		
Gunshi ga Me	郡司妻女		4440–4441		
Hada no Koemaro	秦許遍麿		1589		
Hada no Mamaro	秦間満	Also read Hada no Hashimaro	3589		
Hada no Tamaro	秦田麿		3681		
Hada no Yachishima	秦忌寸八千島	Hada no Imiki Yachishima	3951, 3956		
Haha	親母		1790–1791	Literally "mother"; real name unknown, the mother of a diplomat sent on the Tenpyō 5 [733] mission to Tang China.	
Hakuri	羽栗		3640	A diplomat sent to Silla in Tenpyō 8 (736)	
Hakutsū-hōshi	博通法師		307–309		
Hanishi	土師		4047, 4067		
Hanishi no Inatari	土師稲足		3660	A diplomat sent to Silla in 736.	
Hanishi no Michiyoshi	土師宿禰道良	Hanishi no Sukune Michiyoshi	3955		
Hanishi no Mimichi	土師宿禰水道, 土師乃志婢麿, 土師氏御道 or 土師宿禰水通	Hanishi no Sukune Mimichi	557–558, 843, 3844	Courtesy name Shibimaro (志婢麿). One of the guests at the Tenpyō 2 (730) plum blossom viewing at the residence of Ōtomo no Tabito in the Dazaifu.	
Hanshi no Yasumaro	板氏安麿		831	One of the guests at the 730 plum blossom viewing at the residence of Ōtomo no Tabito in the Dazaifu. He is claimed in the MYS text to have been governor of Iki Province (壱岐守 Iki no Kami) at some point. Old commentaries call him Itamochi no Muraji Yasumaro (板持連安麿).	
Harima no Otome	播磨娘子		1776–1777	A young woman from Harima Province (the literal meaning of "Harima no Otome"), possibly a courtesan or prostitute.	
Hasetsukabe no Hitomaro	丈部造人麿	Hasetsukabe no Miyatsuko Hitomaro	4328		
Hasetsukabe no Inamaro	丈部稲麿		4346		
Hasetsukabe no Kawai	丈部川相		4324		
Hasetsukabe no Kuromasa	丈部黒当		4325		
Hasetsukabe no Mamaro	丈部真麿		4323		
Hasetsukabe no Ōmaro	丈部直大麿	Hasetsukabe no Atai Ōmaro	4389		
Hasetsukabe no Tarihito	丈部足人		4383		
Hasetsukabe no Tori	丈部鳥		4352		
Hasetsukabe no Tarimaro	丈部足麿		4341		
Hasetsukabe no Yamashiro	丈部山代		4355		
Hasetsukabe no Yoromaro	丈部与呂麿		4354		
Hashihito no Ōura	間人宿禰大浦	Hashihito no Sukune Ōura	289–290, 1763		
Hashihito no Oyu	間人連老	Hashihito no Muraji Oyu	3–4		
Hashihito no Sukune	間人宿禰		1685–1686	Possibly the same person as Ōura.	
Hata no Otari	波多朝臣小足	Hata no Asomi Otari	315		
Hatoribe no Asame	服部呰女		4422		
Hatoribe no Ueda	服部於田		4421		
Heguri no Asomi	平群朝臣		3842		
Heguri no Fun'ya no Masuhito	平群文屋朝臣益人	Heguri no Fun'ya no Asomi Masuhito	3098		
Heguri-uji no Iratsume	平群氏女郎		3931–3942; 12 poems in total, all tanka		
Heki no Nagae no Otome	日置長枝娘子		1564		
Heki no Ooyu	日置少老		354		
Princess Hinokuma	檜隈女王	Hinokuma-no-ōkimi	202		
Princess Hirokawa	広河女王	Hirokawa-no-ōkimi	694–695		
Prince Hirose	広瀬王	Hirose-no-ōkimi	1468		
Hitachi no Otome	常陸娘子		521	A young woman from Hitachi Province (the literal meaning of "Hitachi no Otome"). Possibly a courtesan or prostitute.	
Hito	人		23	Literally "a person", this was an anonymous poet who recited old tales and legends.	
Hokaibito	食乞者		3885, 3886		
Hōshi (i)	僧		3847	Literally "a monk"; a different person from (ii) below.	
Hōshi (ii)	僧		1018	A priest of Gangō-ji, and a different person from (i) above.	
Prince Hozumi	穂積皇子	Hozumi-no-miko	203, 1513–1514, 3816		
Hozumi no Asomi	穂積朝臣		3843	Possibly the same person as Oyu.	
Hozumi no Oyu	穂積朝臣老	Hozumi no Asomi Oyu	288, 3241		
Prince Ichihara	市原王	Ichihara-no-ōkimi	412, 662, 988, 1007, 1042, 1546, 1551, 4500		
Ihomaro	伊保麻呂		1735		
Prince Ikebe	池辺王	Ikebe-no-ōkimi	623		
Ikeda no Asomi	池田朝臣		3840		
Prince Ikusa	軍王	Ikusa-no-ōkimi	5–6		
Ikutamabe no Tarikuni	生玉部足国		4326		
Imamatsuribe no Yosofu	今奉部与曽布		4373		
Imube no Kuromaro	忌部首黒麿	Imube no Obito Kuromaro	1008, 1556, 1647, 3848		
Imube no Obito	忌部首		3832		
Prince Inoue	井上王	Inoue-no-ōkimi	19		
Ishikawa no Bunin	石川夫人		154		
Ishikawa no Hironari	石川朝臣広成	Ishikawa no Asomi Hironari	696, 1600–1601		
Ishikawa no Iratsume (i)	石川郎女		97–98	One of several different women identified by this name.	
Ishikawa no Iratsume (ii)	石川郎女		108	One of several different women identified by this name. May have been the same person as (iv), below.	
Ishikawa no Iratsume (iii)	石川女郎		129	One of several different women identified by this name. May have been the same person as (ii), above.	
Ishikawa no Iratsume (iv)	石川女郎			One of several different women identified by this name. The Man'yōshū Mibugushi (万葉集美夫君志) claims her to be a different person from (ii) and (iii), above, but the Man'yōshū Chūshaku (万葉集註釈) treats them as the same person. No poems by this woman were included in the Man'yōshū, but she was the recipient of KKTK 110.	
Ishikawa no Iratsume (v)	石川女郎		126, 128	One of several different women identified by this name. May have been the same person as (ii), above, per the Man'yōshū Chūshaku.	
Ishikawa no Iratsume (vi)	石川郎女		518, 4439	One of several different women identified by this name.	
Ishikawa no Iratsume (vii)	石川郎女		4491	One of several different women identified by this name.	
Ishikawa no Kake no Iratsume	石川賀係女郎		1612		
Ishikawa no Kimiko	石川朝臣吉美侯 or 石川朝臣君子 石川君子朝臣	Ishikawa no Asomi Kimiko; Ishikawa no Kimiko Asomi	278, 2742	Also known as Ishikawa no Oto Iratsuko (石川大夫 or 石川少郎) or Oto Iratsuko (少郎子)	
Ishikawa no Maetsukimi	石川卿		1728		
Ishikawa no Maetsukimi	石川大夫		247		
Ishikawa no Mimichi	石川朝臣水通	Ishikawa no Asomi Mimichi	3998		
Ishikawa no Tarihito	石川朝臣足人	Ishikawa no Asomi Tarihito	955		
Ishikawa no Toshitari	石川朝臣年足	Ishikawa no Asomi Toshitari	474		
Isonokami no Katsuo	石上朝臣堅魚	Isonokami no Asomi Katsuo	1472		
Isonokami no Maetsukimi	石上卿		287	May be the same person as Maro, Otomaro or Toyoniwa.	
Isonokami no Maro	石上朝臣麿	Isonokami no Asomi Maro	44		
Isonokami no Otomaro	石上朝臣乙麿	Isonokami no Asomi Otomaro	368, 374, 1022–1023		
Isonokami no Yakatsugu	石上朝臣宅嗣	Isonokami no Asomi Yakatsugu	4282		
Empress Iwa	磐姫皇后		85–88		
Empress Jitō	持統天皇	Jitō-tennō	28, 159, 160–161, 162, 236, possibly 78, possibly 236		
Emperor Jomei	舒明天皇	Jomei-tennō	2, [485–487], [1511], [1664]		
Emperor Junnin	淳仁天皇	Junnin-tennō	4486		
Prince Kadobe	門部王	Kadobe-no-ōkimi	310, 326, 371, 536, 1013		
Kadobe no Iwatari	門部連石足	Kadobe no Muraji Iwatari	568, 845		
Princess Kagami	鏡王女	Kagami-no-ōkimi	92, 93, 489, 1419, 1607		
Kakinomoto no Hitomaro	柿本朝臣人麿	Kakinomoto no Asomi Hitomaro	29–31, 36–37, 38–39, 40–42, 45–49, 131–133, 134, 135–137, 138–139, 167–169, 170, 194–195, 196–198, 199–201, 202, 207–209, 210–212, 213–216, 217–219, 207–209, 220–222, 223, 235, 239–240, 241, 249–256, 261–262, 264, 266, 303–304, [423,] 426, 428, 429–430, 496–499, 501–503, 1710–1711, 1761–1762, 3611; 88 poems in total, of which 19 are chōka and 69 tanka		
(Kakinomoto no Asomi Hitomaro Kashū)	柿本朝臣人麿之歌集	Kakinomoto no Asomi Hitomaro no Kashū	146, 244, 1068, 1087–1088, 1092–1094, 1100–1101, 1118–1119, 1187, 1247–1250, 1268–1269, 1271, 1272–1294 (sedōka), 1296–1310, 1682–1709 (unclear), 1715–1725 (unclear), 1773–1775, 1795–1799, 1812–1818, 1890–1896, 1996–2033, 2094–2095, 2178–2179, 2234, 2239–2243, 2312–2315, 2333–2334, 2351–2362 (sedōka), 2368–2516, 2841–2863, 3127–3130, 3253–3254, 3309, 3441, 3470, 3481, 3490; 369 poems in total, of which 2 are chōka, 332 tanka and 35 sedōka		
(Quoted in the Hitomaro Kashū)	柿本朝臣人麿之歌集中	Kakinomoto no Asomi Hitomaro no Kashū chū	1782–1783, 2808		
Kakinomoto no Hitomaro's wife	柿本朝臣人麿妻	Kakinomoto no Asomi Hitomaro no tsuma	224–225, 504, possibly 1783		
Kami no Komaro	上古麿		356		
Kamikoso no Oyumaro	神社忌寸老麿	Kamikoso no Imiki Oyumaro, also read Miwamori no Imiki Oyumaro	976–977		
Kamitsukeno no Ushikai	上毛野牛甘		4404		
Princess Kamo	賀茂女王	Kamo-no-ōkimi	556, 565, 1613		
Kamo no Tarihito	鴨君足人	Kamo no Kimi no Tarihito	257–259, 260)		
Kamō no Otome	蒲生娘子		4232, [4236–4237]		
Kannabi no Ikago	甘南備真人伊香	Kannabi no Mahito Ikago	4489, 4502, 4510, 4513	Prince Ikago (伊香王). According to the Shoku Nihongi he acquired his first court rank in 746 served in various regional government capacities such as assistant governor of Mimasaka Province, governor of Bizen Province, and governor of Etchū Province, and was alive at least as late as 777.	
Kannagibe no Maso no Otome	巫部麻蘇娘子		703–704, 1562, 1621		
Kan'omibe no Shimamaro	神麻続部島麿		4381		
Kantobe no Ko Oshio	神人部子忍男		4402		
Karu no Ōiratsume	軽太郎女		90		
Kasa no Iratsume	笠女郎		395–397, 587–610, 1451, 1616; 29 poems in total, all tanka		
Kasa no Kanamura	笠朝臣金村	Kasa no Asomi Kanamura	364–365, 366–367, 543–545, 546–548, 907–909, 910–912, 920–922, 928–930, 935–937, 1453–1455, 1532–1533; 30 poems in total, of which 8 are chōka and 22 tanka		
(Kasa no Asomi Kanamura Kashū)	笠朝臣金村歌集	Kasa no Asomi Kanamura no Kashū	230–232, 233–234		
(Quoted in the Kanamura Kashū)	笠朝臣金村之歌中	Kasa no Asomi Kanamura no Ka chū	368, 369, 950–953, 1785–1786, 1787–1789		
Kasa no Kokimi	笠朝臣子君	Kasa no Asomi Kokimi	4227–4228		
Kasa no Maro	笠朝臣麿	Kasa no Asomi Maro	336, 351, 391, 393, 572–573, 821	Better known by his Buddhist name Sami Mansei.	
Princess Kasanui	笠縫女王	Kasanui-no-ōkimi	1611, 1613		
Kashi no Hachimaro	榎氏鉢麿		838		
Prince Kashihade	膳王	Kashihade-no-ōkimi	954		
Prince Kasuga	春日王	Kasuga-no-ōkimi	669	Died 745.	
Prince Kasuga	春日王	Kasuga-no-ōkimi	243	The identity of KKTK 243's author is unknown, as there are three possible candidates who were all princes named Kasuga and lived during the time the Man'yōshū poems were being composed. Nakanishi tentatively attributes 243 to the figure who died in 699, but presents another who died in 689, and the author of KKTK 669, who died in 745, as alternative possibilities.	
Kasuga no Kura no Oyu	春日蔵首老	Kasuga no Kura no Obito Oyu	56, 62, 282, 284, 286, 298, 1717, 1719		
Kasugabe no Maro	春日部麿		4345		
Kawabe no Azumahito	河辺朝臣東人	Kawabe no Asomi Azumahito	1440		
Kawabe no Miyahito	河辺宮人		228–229, 434–437		
Kawakami no Oyu	川上臣老	Kawakami no Omi Oyu	4376		
Prince Kawamura	河村王	Kawamura-no-ōkimi	3817–3818		
Kawara	川原		1737		
Kawara no Mushimaro	川原虫麿		4340		
Prince Kawashima	川島皇子	Kawashima-no-miko	34, 1716		
Kaya no Otome	草嬢	Also read Kusa no Otome	512		
Kenjū	傔従		3890–3899		
Princess Ki	紀皇女	Ki-no-himemiko	390, 3098		
Ki no Iratsume	紀女郎		643–645, 762–763, 776, 782, 1452, 1460–1461, 1648, 1661; 12 poems in total, all tanka		
Ki no Kahito	紀朝臣鹿人	Ki no Asomi Kahito	990, 991, 1549		
Ki no Kiyohito	紀朝臣清人	Ki no Asomi Kiyohito	1503		
Ki no Maetsukimi	紀卿		815		
Ki no Okaji	紀朝臣男梶	Ki no Asomi Okaji	3924		
Ki no Toyokawa	紀朝臣豊河	Ki no Asomi Toyokawa	3923		
Prince Kinashi no Karu	木梨軽皇子	Kinashi-no-karu-no-miko	3263		
Kinu	絹		1723		
Kisakibe no Isoshima	私部石島		4385		
Prince Kobe	子部王	Kobe-no-ōkimi	[1515]		
Princess Kobe	児部女王	Kobe-no-ōkimi	3821		
Princess Kōchi	河内女王	Kōchi-no-ōkimi	4059		
Kōchi no Momoe no Otome	河内百枝娘子		701–702		
Empress Kōken	孝謙天皇	Kōken-tennō	4264–4265		
Empress Kōmyō	光明皇后	Kōmyō-kōgō	1658, 4224, 4240		
Kose no Iratsume	巨勢郎女		102		
Kose no Nademaro	巨勢朝臣奈弖麿	Kose no Asomi Nademaro	4273		
Kose no Sukunamaro	巨勢朝臣宿奈麿	Kose no Asomi Sukunamaro	1016, 1645		
Kose no Toyohito	巨勢朝臣豊人	Kose no Asomi Toyohito	3845		
Kōshi no Amahito	高氏海人		842		
Kōshi no Gitsū	高氏義通		835		
Kōshi no Inajiki	荒氏稲布		832		
Kōshi no Oyu	高氏老		851		
Kosobe no Tsushima	巨曽倍朝臣津島	Kosobe no Asomi Tsushima	1024, 1576		
Princess Kume	久米女王	Kume-no-ōkimi	1583		
Kume no Hironawa	久米朝臣継麿	Kume no Asomi Hironawa	4050, 4053, 4201, 4203, 4209–4210, 4222, 4231, 4252		
Kume no Iratsume	久米女郎		1459		
Kume no Tsugimaro	久米朝臣継麿	Kume no Asomi Tsugimaro	4202		
Kume no Zenji	久米禅師		96, 99, 100		
Kura no Nawamaro	内蔵忌寸縄麿	Kura no Imiki Nawamaro	3996, 4087, 4200, 4233		
Princess Kurahashibe	倉橋部女王	Kurahashibe-no-ōkimi	441, 1613		
Kurahashibe no Otome	椋椅部弟女		4420		
Kurahashibe no Tojime	椋椅部刀自売		4416		
Kurazukuri no Masuhito	桉作村主益人	Kurazukuri no Suguri Masuhito	311, 1004		
Kurohito no Me	黒人妻		281	Wife of Takechi no Kurohito.	
Kurumamochi no Chitose	車持朝臣千年	Kurumamochi no Asomi Chitose	913–914, 915–916, 931–932, 950–953		
Prince Kusakabe	草壁皇子	Kusakabe-no-miko	110	Credited as "August Prince Hinamishi" (日並皇子尊 Hinamishi-no-miko-no-mikoto).	
Kusakabe no Minaka	日下部使主三中	Kusakabe no Omi Minaka	4348		
Makatachi	婢		3857		
Prince Mamuta	茨田王	Mamuta-no-ōkimi	4283		
Maro	麻呂		1725, 1782	Possibly an abbreviated form of the name Hitomaro.	
Maroko no Ōmaro	丸子連多麿	Maroko no Muraji Ōmaro	4330		
Maroko no Ōtoshi	丸子連大歳	Maroko no Muraji Ōtoshi	4353		
Marokobe no Sukeo	丸子部佐壮		4368		
Princess Matokata	円方女王	Matokata-no-ōkimi	4283		
Meko	妻子		3860–3869; 10 poems in total, all tanka	Her real name unknown, Meko simply means "wife". She was the wife of a fisherman from Shika Island in Chikuzen Province (筑前国志賀白水郎 Chikuzen no Shika no Ama).	
Mibu no Udamaro	壬生使主宇太麿	Mibu no Omi Udamaro	3612, 3669, 3674–3675, 3702		
Mibube no Michimaro	生部道麿		4338		
Prince Mihara	三原王	Mihara-no-ōkimi	1543		
Prince Mikata	三形王	Mikata-no-ōkimi	4488, 4511		
Mikata no Sami	三方沙弥		123, 125, 508, 1027, 2315, 4227–4228		
Mikuni no Hitotari	三国真人人足	Mikuni no Mahito Hitotari	1655		
Princess Minabe	御名部皇女	Minabe-no-himemiko	77		
Mino no Isomori	三野連石守	Mino no Muraji Isomori	1644, 3890		
Prince Mishima	三島王	Mishima-no-ōkimi	883		
Miteshiro no Hitona	三手代人名		1588		
Miwa no Takechimaro	三輪朝臣高市麿	Miwa no Asomi Takechimaro	1770		
Emperor Monmu	文武天皇	Monmu-tennō	74, possibly 236		
Mononobe no Akimochi	物部秋持		4321		
Mononobe no Hirotari	物部広足		4418		
Mononobe no Komaro	物部古麿		4327		
Mononobe no Mane	物部真根		4419		
Mononobe no Mashima	物部真島		4375		
Mononobe no Michitari	物部道足		4365–4366		
Mononobe no Otora	物部乎刀良		4356		
Mononobe no Tatsu	物部龍		4358		
Mononobe no Tojime	物部刀自売		4424		
Mononobe no Toshitoko	物部歳徳		4415		
Prince Moribe	守部王	Moribe-no-ōkimi	999, 1000		
Musaba	六鯖		3694–3696		
Prince Mutobe	身人部王	Mutobe-no-ōkimi	68		
Prince Naga	長皇子	Naga-no-miko	60, 65, 73, 84		
Naga no Okimaro	長忌寸意吉麿	Naga no Imiki Otome	1584		
Naga no Otome	長忌寸娘	Naga no Imiki Okimaro	57, 143–144, 238, 265, 1673, 3824–3831, 3754–3766, 3775–3776, 3777–3785; 14 poems in total, all tanka		
Prince Nagaya	長屋王	Nagaya-no-ōkimi	75, 268, 300–301, 1517		
Naka tsu Sumeramikoto	中皇命 or 中天皇		3–4, 10–12	The title refers to a "junior emperor", but the exact identity of the poet is uncertain.	
Nakatomi no Azumahito	中臣朝臣東人	Nakatomi no Asomi Azumahito	515		
Nakatomi no Iratsume	中臣女郎		675–679		
Nakatomi no Kiyomaro	中臣朝臣清麿	Nakatomi no Asomi Kiyomaro	4258, 4296, 4497, 4499, 4504, 4508		
Nakatomi no Muraji	中臣朝臣武良自	Nakatomi no Asomi Muraji	1439		
Nakatomi no Yakamori	中臣朝臣宅守	Nakatomi no Asomi Yakamori	3727–3730, 3731–3744, 3754–3766, 3775–3776, 3777–3785; 40 poems in total, all tanka		
Nakatomibe no Tarikuni	中臣部足国		4378		
Naniwa no Sumeramikoto no Iromo	難波天皇妹		484		
Prince Niu	丹生王	Niu-no-ōkimi	420–422	Possibly the same person as Princess Niu below, as one orthography of ōkimi is definitely female, while the other could be gender-neutral.	
Princess Niu	丹生女王	Niu-no-ōkimi	553–554, 1610, possibly 420–422	Possibly the same person as Prince Niu above.	
Nochi no Hito (i)	後人		520	Literally "a later person", possibly Ōtomo no Yakamochi. Apparently a distinct poet from (ii), (iii) and (iv).	
Nochi no Hito (ii)	後人		861–863	Literally "a later person". Apparently a distinct poet from (i), (iii) and (iv).	
Nochi no Hito (iii)	後人		872, 873, 874–875	Literally "a later person". Apparently a distinct poet from (i), (ii) and (iv).	
Nochi no Hito (iv)	後人後人		1680–1681	Literally "a later person". Apparently a distinct poet from (i), (ii) and (iii).	
Noto no Otomi	能登臣乙美	Noto no Omi Otomi	4069		
Princess Nukata	額田王	Nukata-no-ōkimi	7, 8, 9, 16, 17–18, 20, 112, 113, 151, 155, 488, 1606; 13 poems in total, of which 3 are chōka and 10 tanka		
Nuki no Keta no Obito	抜気大首		1767–1769		
Ōami no Hitonushi	大網公人主	Ōami no Kimi Hitonushi	413		
Oda no Koto	小田事		291		
Ōhara no Imaki	大原真人今城	Ōhara no Mahito Imaki	1604, 4436–4439, 4442, 4444, 4459, 4475–4476, 4477–4480, 4496, 4505, 4507		
Ohatsusebe no Kasamaro	小長谷部笠麿		4403		
Ōishi no Minomaro	大石蓑麿		3617		
Okamoto no Sumeramikoto	崗本天皇		485–487, 1511, 1664	Literally "the Okamoto Emperor", referring to an emperor who ruled from the Okamoto Palace, but which of the two emperors who reigned there—Emperor Jomei or Empress Saimei—this refers to is uncertain.	
Okisome no Azumahito	置始東人		66, 204–206		
Okisome no Hatsuse	置始連長谷	Okisome no Muraji Hatsuse	4302		
Princess Ōku	大伯皇女	Ōku-no-himemiko	105–106, 163–166		
Okura no Maetsukimi no Onoko	憶良大夫之男		4365		
Ōkura no Maro	大蔵忌寸麿	Ōkura no Imiki Maro	3703		
Prince Omi	麻続王	Omi-no-ōkimi	24		
Omina no Chichihaha	女之父母		3815	Literally "the woman's parents". 3814 is a request to the parents to marry their daughter, whom the poet heard had recently been divorced. They sent a reply, 3815, explaining that she had already remarried.	
Ominame	婦人 (i)–(ii), 妾 (iii)		150 (ii)	Literally meaning "a lady", this refers to at least three people as used in the notes and poetic attributions of the Man'yōshū, including one poet. (i) and (iii) had no poems attributed to them in the collection.	
Ōmiwa no Iratsume	大神女郎		618, 1505		
Ōmiwa no Okimori	大神朝臣奥守	Ōmiwa no Asomi Okimori	3841		
Ono no Kunikata	小野朝臣国堅	Ono no Asomi Kunikata	844		
Ono no Oyu	小野朝臣老	Ono no Asomi Oyu	328, 816, 958		
Onoshi no Tamori	小野氏淡理		846		
Prince Osada	長田王	Osada-no-ōkimi	81–83, 245–246, 248		
Osada no Himatsuri no Tokotari	他田日奉直得大理	Osada no Himatsuri no Atai Tokotari	4384		
Osada no Hirotsu no Otome	他田広津娘子		1652, 1659		
Osada no Toneribe no Ōshima	他田舎人大島		4401		
Osadabe no Ko Iwasaki	他田部子磐前		4407		
Osakabe no Chikuni	刑部直千国	Osakabe no Atai Chikuni	4357		
Osakabe no Mino	刑部直三野	Osakabe no Atai Mino	4349		
Osakabe no Mushimaro	刑部虫麿		4339		
Osakabe no Otomaro	忍坂部乙麿		71		
Osakabe no Shikamaro	刑部志加麿		4390		
Osakabe no Tarimaro	刑部垂麿		263, 427		
Ōshi no Mahito	生石村主真人	Ōshi no Suguri Mahito	355		
Oshinumibe no Iomaro	忍海部五百麿		4391		
Ōtabe no Aramimi	大田部荒耳		4374		
Ōtabe no Minari	大田部三成		4380		
Ōtabe no Tarihito	大田部足人		4387		
Prince Otai	小鯛王	Otai-no-ōkimi	3819–3820		
Otoko	壮士 (i)–(vi)		3786–3787 (i), 3788–3790 (ii), 3804 (iv), 3814 (vi)	Literally meaning "a man", this refers to several people as used in the notes and poetic attributions of the Man'yōshū, including probably four distinct poets. (iii) and (v) had no poems attributed to them in the collection, but were mentioned in the headnote of 3803 and the endnote of 3806, respectively.	
Otome	娘子 (i)–(xviii), 嬢子 (xix), 童女 (xx)		404, 406, 627 (vi); 633–634, 637, 639, 641 (vii); 1457 (ix); 1778 (xii); 3682 (xiv); 3794–3802, 3803, 3805, 3806, 3809, 3810, 3815 (xv); 706 (xx)	Literally meaning "a girl", this refers to several people as used in the notes and poetic attributions of the Man'yōshū, including at least eight distinct poets.	
Ōtomo no Azumahito	大伴宿禰東人	Ōtomo no Sukune Azumahito	1034		
Ōtomo no Chimuro	大伴宿禰千室	Ōtomo no Sukune Chimuro	693, 4298		
Ōtomo no Daibu	大伴大夫		819		
Ōtomo no Fumimochi	大伴宿禰書持	Ōtomo no Sukune Fumimochi	463, 1480–1481, 1587, 3901–3906, 3909–3910	The son of Tabito and younger brother of Yakamochi.	
Ōtomo no Ikenushi	大伴宿禰池主	Ōtomo no Sukune Ikenushi	1590, 3944–3946, 3949, 3967–3968, 3973–3975, 4128–4131, 4132–4133, 4295, 4300; 29 poems in total, of which 4 are chōka and 25 tanka		
Ōtomo no Inakimi	大伴宿禰稲公	Ōtomo no Sukune Inakimi	1553		
Ōtomo no Iratsume (i)	大伴郎女			Wife of Tabito, and apparently a different person from (ii) below. The Man'yōshū includes no poems attributed to her, but she was mentioned in a note accompanying 1472.	
Ōtomo no Iratsume (ii)	大伴女郎		519	Apparently a different person from (i) above, and possibly the daughter of Yasumaro.	
Ōtomo no Katami	大伴宿禰像見	Ōtomo no Sukune Katami	664, 697–699, 1595		
Ōtomo no Kiyotsugu	大伴宿禰清継	Ōtomo no Sukune Kiyotsugu	4262–4263		
Ōtomo no Kiyotsuna	大伴清縄		1482		
Ōtomo no Kuromaro	大伴宿禰黒麿	Ōtomo no Sukune Kuromaro	4280		
Ōtomo no Maetsukimi	大伴卿		299	Not a name but a title used in various places in the collection, probably referring to Tabito, Yasumaro or Michitari. The one poem attributed to "Maetsukimi", was probably written by Tabito or Yasumaro.	
Ōtomo no Mihayashi	大伴宿禰三林	Ōtomo no Sukune Mihayashi	1434	May be a scribal error for Miyori, as the name is otherwise unattested.	
Ōtomo no Minaka	大伴宿禰三中	Ōtomo no Sukune Minaka	443–445, 3701, 3707		
Ōtomo no Miyori	大伴宿禰三依	Ōtomo no Sukune Miyori	552, 578, 650, 690, [819]	The son of Miyuki.	
Ōtomo no Miyuki	大伴宿禰御行	Ōtomo no Sukune Miyuki	4260	The son of Umakai, father of Miyori and older brother of Yasumaro.	
Ōtomo no Momoyo	大伴宿禰百代	Ōtomo no Sukune Momoyo	392, 559–562, 566, 823		
Ōtomo no Murakami	大伴宿禰村上	Ōtomo no Sukune Murakami	1436–1437, 1493, 4299		
Ōtomo no Sakanoue no Iratsume	大伴坂上郎女		379–380, 401, 410, 460–461, 525–528, 529, 563–564, 585, 586, 619–620, 647, 649, 651–652, 656–661, 666–667, 673–674, 683–689, 721, 723–724, 725–726, 760–761, 963, 964, 979, 981–982, 992, 993, 995, 1017, 1028, 1432–1433, 1445, 1447, 1450, 1474, 1475, 1484, 1498, 1500, 1502, 1548, 1560–1561, 1592–1593, 1620, 1651, 1654, 1656, 3927–3928, 3929–3930, 3927–3928, 4080–4081, 4220–4221; 84 poems in total, of which 6 are chōka, 77 tanka and 1 sedōka		
Ōtomo no Sakanoue no Ō-otome	大伴坂上大嬢		581–584, 729–731, 735, 737–738, 1624; 11 poems in total, all tanka		
Ōtomo no Sukunamaro	大伴宿禰宿奈麿	Ōtomo no Sukune Sukunamaro	532–533		
Ōtomo no Surugamaro	大伴宿禰駿河麿	Ōtomo no Sukune Surugamaro	300, 402, 407, 409, 646, 648, 653–655, 1438, 1660; 11 poems in total, all tanka		
Ōtomo no Tabito	大伴宿禰旅人	Ōtomo no Sukune Tabito	315–316, 331–335, 338–350, 438–440, 446–450, 451–453, 555, 574–575, 577, 793, 806–807, 810–811, 822, [847–852, 853–860,] 861–863, 871, 872, 873, 874–875, 956, 957, 960, 961, 967–968, 969–970, 1473, 1541–1542, 1639, 1640; 76 poems in total, of which 1 is a chōka and 75 tanka		
Ōtomo no Tamura no Ō-otome	大伴田村大嬢		756–759, 1449, 1506, 1622–1623, 1662		
Ōtomo no Tanushi	大伴宿禰田主	Ōtomo no Sukune Tanushi	127		
Ōtomo no Toshikami	大伴利上		1573		
Ōtomo no Yakamochi	大伴宿禰家持	Ōtomo no Sukune Yakamochi	403, 408, 414, 462, 464, 465, 466–469, 470–474, 475–477, 478–480, 611–612, 680–682, 691–692, 700, 705, 714–720, 722, 727–728, 732–734, 736, 739–740, 741–755, 764, 765, 767–768, 769, 770–774, 775, 777–781, 783–785, 786–788, 789–790, 994, 1029, 1032–1033, 1035, 1036, 1037, 1040, 1043, 1441, 1446, 1448, 1462–1463, 1464, 1477, 1478, 1479, 1485, 1486–1487, 1488, 1489, 1490, 1491, 1494–1495, 1496, 1507–1509, 1510, 1554, 1563, 1565, 1566–1569, 1572, 1591, 1596, 1597–1599, 1602–1603, 1605, 1619, 1625, 1626, 1627–1628, 1629–1630, 1631, 1632, 1635, 1649, 1663, 3853–3854, 3900, 3901–3906, (Note: The Genryaku-bon attributes these to Fumimochi.) 3911–3913, 3916–3921, 3926, 3943, 3947–3948, 3950, 3953–3954, 3957–3959, 3960–3961, 3962–3964, 3965–3966, 3969–3973, 3976–3977, 3978–3982, 3983–3984, 3985–3987, 3988, 3988–3990, 3991–3992, 3995, 3997, 3999, 4000–4002, 4006–4007, 4011–4015, 4017–4020, 4021–4029, 4030–4031, 4037, 4043, 4044–4045, 4048, 4051, 4054–4055, 4063–4064, 4066, 4068, 4070, 4071, 4072, 4076–4079, 4082–4084, 4085, 4086, 4088, 4089–4092, 4093, 4094–4097, 4098–4100, 4101–4105, 4106–4109, 4110, 4111–4112, 4113–4115, 4116–4118, 4119, 4120–4121, 4122–4123, 4124, 4125–4127, 4134, 4135, 4136, 4137, 4138, 4139–4140, 4141, 4142, 4143, 4144–4145, 4146–4147, 4148–4149, 4150, 4151–4153, 4154–4155, 4156–4158, 4159, 4160–4162, 4163, 4164–4165, 4166–4168, 4169–4170, 4171–4172, 4173, 4174, 4175–4176, 4177–4179, 4180–4183, 4185–4186, 4187–4188, 4189–4191, 4192–4193, 4194–4196, 4197–4198, 4199, 4205, 4206, 4207–4208, 4211–4212, 4213, 4214–4216, 4217, 4218, 4219, 4223, 4225, 4226, 4229, 4230, 4234, 4238, 4239, 4248–4249, 4250, 4251, 4253, 4254–4255, 4256, 4259, 4266–4267, 4272, 4278, 4281, 4285–4287, 4288, 4289, 4290–4291, 4292, 4297, 4303, 4304, 4305, 4306–4313, 4314, 4315–4320, 4331–4333, 4334–4336, 4360–4362, 4395–4397, 4398–4400, 4408–4412, 4434–4435, 4443, 4445, 4450–4451, 4453, 4457, 4460–4462, 4463–4464, 4465–4467, 4468–4470, 4471, 4474, 4481, 4483, 4484, 4485, 4490, 4492, 4493, 4494, 4495, 4498, 4501, 4503, 4506, 4509, 4512, 4514, 4515, 4516; 479 poems in total, of which 46 are chōka, 431 tanka, 1 sedōka and 1 renga	Son of Tabito, grandson of Yasumaro, older brother of Fumimochi.	
Ōtomo no Yakamochi no iromo	大伴家持妹		4184		
Ōtomo no Yasumaro	大伴宿禰安麿	Ōtomo no Sukune Yasumaro	101, [299,] 517		
Ōtomo no Yotsuna	大伴宿禰四綱	Ōtomo no Sukune Yotsuna	329–330, 571, 629, 1499		
Ōtomobe no Fushimaro	大伴部節麿		4406		
Ōtomobe no Hironari	大伴部広成		4382		
Ōtomobe no Kohitsuji	大伴部子羊		4394		
Ōtomobe no Matarime	大伴部真足女		4413		
Ōtomobe no Mayosa	大伴部麻与佐		4392		
Ōtomobe no Otoshi	大伴部小歳		4414		
Ōtoneribe no Chifumi	大舎人部千文		4369–4370		
Ōtoneribe no Nemaro	大舎人部禰麿		4379		
Prince Ōtsu	大津皇子	Ōtsu-no-miko	107, 109, 416		
Owari no Muraji	尾張連		1421–1422		
Owarida no Hiromimi	小治田朝臣東麿	Owarida no Asomi Hiromimi	1476, 1501		
Saeki no Akamaro	佐伯宿禰赤麿	Saeki no Sukune Akamaro	405, 628, 630		
Saeki no Azumahito	佐伯宿禰東人	Saeki no Sukune Azumahito	622		
Saeki no Azumahito no Me	佐伯宿禰東人妻	Saeki no Sukune Azumahito no Me	622	Wife of Azumahito.	
Saeki no Kobito	佐伯子首		830	Also known as Sashi no Ko Obito (佐氏子首).	
Empress Saimei	斉明天皇	Saimei-tennō	[10–12], [485–487], [1511]		
Prince Sakaibe	境部王	Sakaibe-no-ōkimi	3833		
Sakaibe no Oyumaro	境部宿禰老麿	Sakaibe no Sukune Oyumaro	3907–3908		
Sakanoue no Hitoosa	坂上忌寸人長	Sakanoue no Imiki Hitoosa	1679		
Sakatabe no Maro	坂田部首麿	Sakatabe no Obito Maro	4342		
Sakato no Hitotari	坂門人足		54		
Saki no Uneme	前采女		3807		
Sakimori no Me	防人之妻		3344–3345		
Prince Sakurai	桜井王	Sakurai-no-ōkimi	1614, 4478		
Sami	沙弥		1469		
Princess Sami	沙弥女王	Sami-no-ōkimi	1763		
Samini	沙弥尼		1558–1559		
Sano no Chigami no Otome	狭野茅上娘子		3723–3726, 3745–3753, 3767–3774, 3777–3778; 23 poems in total, all tanka		
Sazakibe no Hiroshima	雀部広島		4393		
Sechimyōkan no Myōbu	薛妙観命婦		4438, 4456		
Sena no Gyōmon	背奈公行文	Sena no Kimi Gyōmon	3836		
Prince Shiki	志貴皇子	Shiki-no-miko	51, 64, 267, 513, 1418, 1466		
Shihi no Omina	志斐嫗		237		
Shiino no Nagatoshi	椎野連長年	Shiino no Muraji Nagatoshi	3823		
Shimatari	島足		1724		
Shishi no Ōhara	史氏大原		826		
Shishi no Ōmichi	志氏大道		837		
Shitoribe no Karamaro	倭文部可良麿		4372		
Shōben	小弁		305, 1719, 1734		
Emperor Shōmu	聖武天皇	Shōmu-tennō	430, 624, 973–974, 1009, 1030, 1539–1540, 1615, 1638, 4269		
Prince Shōtoku	聖徳皇子	Shōtoko-no-miko	415		
Sono no Ikuha no Musume	園臣生羽之女	Sono no Omi Ikuha no Musume	124		
Sonshi no Ochikata	村氏彼方		480		
Suminoe no Otome	清江娘子		69		
Suruga no Uneme	駿河婇女		507, 1420		
Tabe no Ichihiko	田部忌寸櫟子	Tabe no Imiki Ichihiko	493–495		
Tachibana no Ayanari	橘宿禰文成	Tachibana no Sukune Ayanari	1014		
Tachibana no Moroe	橘宿禰諸兄	Tachibana no Sukune Moroe	1025, 3922, 4056, 4270, 4447–4448, 4454		
Tachibana no Naramaro	橘宿禰奈良麿	Tachibana no Sukune Naramaro	1010, 1581–1582		
Tagi no Maro no Me	当麻真人麿妻	Tagi no Mahito Maro no Me	43, 511	"Name" translates to "Tagi no Mahito Maro's wife".	
Taguchi no Masuhito	田口朝臣益人	Taguchi no Asomi Masuhito	296–297		
Taguchi no Umaosa	田口朝臣馬長	Taguchi no Asomi Umaosa	3914		
Taishi no Nakachiko	大使之第二男		3659		
Tajihi no Hanishi	丹治比真人土作	Tajihi no Mahito Hanishi	4243		
Tajihi no Kasamaro	丹比真人笠麿	Tajihi no Mahito Kasamaro	285, 509–510		
Tajihi no Kunihito	丹比真人国人	Tajihi no Mahito Kunihito	382–383, 1557, 4446		
Tajihi no Mahito	丹比真人		226, 1609, 1726	Given name, and whether the three attributions to a "Tajihi no Mahito" all refer to the same person, unknown.	
Tajihi no Otomaro	丹比真人乙麿	Tajihi no Mahito Otomaro	1443		
Tajihi no Takanushi	丹治比真人鷹主	Tajihi no Mahito Takanushi	4262		
Tajihi no Yanushi	丹比真人屋主	Tajihi no Mahito Yanushi	3625–3626		
Tajihibe no Kunihito	丹比部国人	Tajihi no Mahito Kunihito	4329		
Princess Tajima	但馬皇女	Tajima-no-himemiko	114, 115, 116, 1515		
Takahashi no Asomi	高橋朝臣		481–483		
Takahashi no Mushimaro	高橋連虫麿	Takahashi no Muraji Mushimaro	971–972		
(Takahashi no Muraji Mushimaro no Kashū)	高橋連虫麿之歌集		1738–1739, 1740–1741, 1742–1743, 1744, 1745, 1746, 1747–1748, 1749–1750, 1751–1752, 1753–1754, 1755–1756, 1757–1758, 1759–1760, 1807–1808, 1809–1811; 29 poems in total, of which 12 are chōka, 16 tanka and 1 sedōka		
(Quoted in the Takahashi no Muraji Mushimaro no Kashū)	高橋連虫麿之歌集中	Takahashi no Muraji Mushimaro no Kashū chū	319–321, 1497, 1780–1781		
Prince Takamiya	高宮王	Takamiya-no-ōkimi	3855–3856		
Takaoka no Kōchi	高丘連河内	Takaoka no Muraji Kōchi	1038–1039		
Princess Takata	高田女王	Takata-no-ōkimi	537–542, 1444		
Prince Takayasu	高安王	Takayasu-no-ōkimi	625, 1504, 3952		
Takayasu no Kurahito no Tanemaro	高安倉人種麿		4240–4247		
Prince Takechi	高市皇子	Takechi-no-miko	156–158		
Takechi no Furuhito	高市古人		32–33	May be a scribal error for Kurohito.	
Takechi no Kurohito	高市連黒人	Takechi no Muraji Kurohito	58, 70, 270–277, 279–280, 283, 305, (Note: Attributed by some texts to Shōben.) 1718, 4016; 16 poems in total, all tanka		
Princess Taki	多紀皇女	Taki-no-himemiko	[3098]		
Tamatsuki	玉槻		3704–3705		
Tamatsukuribe no Kunioshi	玉作部国忍		4351		
Tamatsukuribe no Hirome	玉作部広目		4351		
Princess Tamochi	手持女王	Tamochi-no-ōkimi	417–419, 1444		
Tanabe no Akiniwa	田辺秋庭		3638		
Tanabe no Sakimaro	田辺史福麿	Tanabe no Fuhito Sakimaro	4032–4035, 4036 4038–4042, 4046, 4049, 4052, 4056–4062; 20 poems in total, all tanka		
(Tanabe no Sakimaro no Kashū)	田辺福麿之歌集		1047–1049, 1050–1052, 1053–1058, 1059–1061, 1062–1064, 1065–1067, 1792–1794, 1800, 1801–1803, 1804–1806; 31 poems in total, of which 10 are chōka and 21 tanka		
Taniwa no Ōme no Otome	丹波大女娘子		711–713		
Tanshi no Maro	丹氏麿		828		
Emperor Tenji	天智天皇	Tenchi-tennō	13–15, 91		
Emperor Tenmu	天武天皇	Tenmu-tennō	21, 25, 26, 27, 103, possibly 236		
Tohito	鄙人		3808		
Toneri	舎人		171–193; 23 poems in total, all tanka		
Prince Toneri	舎人皇子	Toneri-no-miko	117, 1706, 4294		
Toneri no Kine	舎人吉年		152, 492		
Toneri no Otome	舎人娘子		61, 118, 1636		
Tori no Senryō	土理宣令		313, 1470		
Toshi no Momomura	土氏百村		825		
Toshima no Uneme	豊島采女		1026, 1027 (Note: Attributed by some texts to Mikata no Sami.)		
Toyo no Michinokuchi no Kuni no Otome	豊前国娘子		709, 984		
Tsūkan	通観		327, 353		
Tsuki no Obito	調使首	Tsuki no Omi Obito	3339–3343		
Tsuki no Ōmi	調首淡海	Tsuki no Obito Ōmi	55		
Tsukimoto	槐本		1715		
Tsuno no Kōben	角朝臣広弁	Tsuno no Asomi Kōben	1641		
Tsuno no Maro	角麿		292–295		
Tsumori no Ogurusu	津守宿禰小黒栖	Tsumori no Sukune Ogurusu	4377		
Uhyōe	右兵衛		3837		
Ujibe no Kurome	宇遅部黒女		4417		
Ukare-me (i)	遊行女婦		381, 965–966	Literally "a courtesan", someone who would perform musical and poetic entertainment at parties held at regional government offices.	
Ukare-me (ii)	遊行女婦			Literally "a courtesan", someone who would perform musical and poetic entertainment at parties held at regional government offices.No poems included in the Man'yōshū, but was associated with 4106, 4108 and 4110.	
Ukare-me (iii)	遊行女婦		1492	Literally "a courtesan", someone who would perform musical and poetic entertainment at parties held at regional government offices.	
Uma no Kunihito	馬史国人	Uma no Fuhito Kunihito	4458		
Umashine	味稲		385		
Princess Umikami	海上女王	Umikami-no-ōkimi	531		
Uno no Ohito	宇怒首男人	Uno no Obito Ohito	959		
Urabe no Hirokata	占部広方		4371		
Urabe no Mushimaro	占部虫麿		4388		
Urabe no Otatsu	占部小龍		4367		
Utobe no Ushimaro	有度部牛麿		4337		
Wakamiya no Ayuchimaro	若宮年魚麿		387, 388–389, 1429–1430		
Wakaomibe no Hitsuji	若麻続部羊		4359		
Wakaomibe no Morohito	若麻続部諸人		4350		
Wakasakurabe no Kimitari	若桜部朝臣君足	Wakasakurabe no Asomi Kimitari	1643		
Wakatoneribe no Hirotari	若舎人部広足		4363–4364		
Wakayamatobe no Mumaro	若倭部身麿		4322		
Prince Wakayue	若湯座王	Wakayue-no-ōkimi	352		
Yahagibe no Managa	矢作部真長		4386		
Prince Yamabe	山部王	Yamabe-no-ōkimi	1516		
Yamabe no Akahito	山部宿禰赤人	Yamabe no Sukune Akahito	317–318, 322–323, 324–325, 357–362, 363, 372–373, 378, 384, 341–433, 917–919, 923–925, 926–927, 933–934, 938–941, 942–945, 946–947, 1001, 1005–1006, 1424–1427, 1431, 1471, 3915; 50 poems in total, of which 13 are chōka and 37 tanka		
Yamada no Hijimaro	山田史土麿	Yamada no Fuhito Hijimaro	4294		
Princess Yamaguchi	山口女王	Yamaguchi-no-ōkimi	613–617, 1617		
Yamaguchi no Wakamaro	山口忌寸若麿	Yamaguchi no Imiki Wakamaro	567, 827		
Prince Yamakuma	山前王	Yamakuma-no-ōkimi	423, 424–425		
Yamanoue no Okura	山上臣憶良	Yamanoue no Omi Okura	[34], 63, 145, 337, 794–799, 800–801, 802–803, 804–805, [813–814], 818, 868–870, 874–875, 876–879, 880–882, 886–891, 892–893, 894–896, 904–905, [906], 897–903, 978, 1518, 1519, 1520–1522, 1523–1526, 1527–1529, 1537–1538, 1716, 3860–3869; 78 poems in total, of which 11 are chōka, 66 tanka and 1 sedōka		
Prince Yamashiro	山背王	Yamashiro-no-ōkimi	4473		
Yamato	大倭		1736		
Empress Yamato	倭大后	Yamato-no-ōkisaki	147, 148, 149, 153		
Yashi no Sukunamaro	野氏宿奈麿		833		
Princess Yashiro	八代女王	Yashiro-no-ōkimi	626		
Yo no Myōgun	余明軍		394, 454–458, 579–580		
Princess Yosa	誉謝女王	Yosa-no-ōkimi	59		
Yosami no Otome	依羅娘子		140, 224–225		
Yoshida no Yoroshi	吉田連宜	Yoshida no Muraji Yoroshi	864, 865, 866, 867		
Prince Yuge	弓削皇子	Yuge-no-miko	111, 119–122, 242, 1467, 1608		
Prince Yuhara	湯原王	Yuhara-no-ōkimi	375, 376–377, 631–632, 635–636, 638, 640, 642, 670, 985–986, 989, 1544–1545, 1550, 1552, 1618; 19 poems in total, all tanka		
Yuki no Yakamaro	雪連宅麿	Yuki no Muraji Yakamaro	3644		
Emperor Yūryaku	雄略天皇	Yūryaku-tennō	1, 1664		
