= Asada no Yasu =

Japanese Poet in the Nara Period

Asada no Yasu (麻田陽春) was a poet in Japan's Nara period who composed both waka (poetry in Japanese) and kanshi (poetry in Chinese).

== Biography ==
Asada no Yasu was active in the Nara period of Japanese history. His birth and death dates are unknown.

He was a member of the immigrant Tōhon clan (答本氏), and was originally named Tōhon no Yasu, but in the fifth month of Jinki 1 (724) was given the surname Asada and the hereditary title Muraji, and so became Asada no Muraji Yasu (麻田連陽春). At this time, he held the court rank of Senior Eighth Rank, Upper Grade.

It is known that by 730 he was working in Dazaifu under Ōtomo no Tabito, and had attained the Junior Sixth Rank, Lower Grade.

In the first month of 739 he was promoted to the Junior Fifth Rank, Lower Grade. According to the Kaifūsō, during the time he held this rank he became the governor of Iwami Province, and this was in his fifty-sixth year, but it is unclear when that was.

He probably lived until around 749.

== Poetry ==
=== Waka ===
Four of his tanka (the name used for waka in the standard 5-7-5-7-7 metre in the pre-Heian period) were included in the Man'yōshū. These poems were number 569 and 570 (book 4), and 884 and 885 (book 5). All of these poems were composed during his time at Dazaifu. Poems 884 and 885 are accompanied by responses from the poet Yamanoue no Okura, so it is clear he had some amount of literary engagement with that poet.

His socializing with both Tabito and Okura while they were in Tsukushi has led to speculation that he may have been involved in the compilation of an early form of what became book 5 of the Man'yōshū.

=== Kanshi ===
One of his kanshi was included in the Kaifūsō.

He wrote a response to a kanshi composed by Fujiwara no Nakamaro during the time the latter was governor of Ōmi Province (a position he was granted in the ninth month of 747), and this appears to have been composed toward the end of his life.

== Works cited ==
- Kojima, Noriyuki (1983). "Asada no Yasu". Nihon Koten Bungaku Daijiten 日本古典文学大辞典 (in Japanese). Vol. 1. Tokyo: Iwanami Shoten. pp. 41–42. OCLC 11917421.
