= Ki no Maetsukimi =

Ki no Maetsukimi (紀 卿) was a Japanese noble and waka poet in the Nara period.

== Biography ==
The details of the life of the poet known as Ki no Maetsukimi (maetsukimi meaning a lord, and Ki being a noble family's name) are unknown. In Tenpyō 2 (730) he participated in a plum blossom-viewing party at the residence of Ōtomo no Tabito, then the governor (一大宰帥, ichi dazai no sochi) of the Dazaifu.

Yūkichi Takeda's Man'yōshū Zenchūshaku (万葉集全註釈) speculates that he may have been the same person who died in Tenpyō 10 (738) while serving as co-administrator (大弐, daini) of the Dazaifu.

== Poetry ==
Poem 815 in the Man'yōshū is attributed to him.

Man'yōgana	Modern Japanese text	Reconstructed Old Japanese	Modern Japanese	English translation
武都紀多知 波流能吉多良婆 可久斯許曽 烏梅乎乎<岐>都々 多努之岐乎倍米	正月立ち 春の来らば かくしこそ 梅を招きつつ 楽しき終へめ		mutsuki tachi haru no kitaraba kakushi koso ume o okitsutsu tanoshiki oeme

== See also ==
- Reiwa
