= Prince Yuhara =

Japanese Prince

Prince Yuhara (湯原王 Yuhara-ō or Yuhara no Ōkimi) was a Japanese imperial prince and waka poet of the Nara period. He was a grandson of Emperor Tenji and a brother of Emperor Kōnin, but the details of his life, including his birth and death dates, are unknown.

He was active in poetic composition in the 730s, and 19 of his poems were included in the Man'yōshū. He was probably a significant influence on the other poets of the Tenpyō era, including Ōtomo no Yakamochi.

== Life ==
Prince Yuhara's year of birth is unknown. He was a son of Prince Shiki (施基皇子 or 志貴皇子), who in turn was a son of Emperor Tenji. On the accession of his brother Prince Shirakabe to throne as Emperor Kōnin in 770 he was given the title shinnō, but the details of his career are not well known.

Prince Ichishi, who died in 805 in his early 70s, was his second child. He was also an uncle of Prince Aki, who composed Man'yōshū 506 to 508.

His year of death is unknown.

== Poetry ==
19 of his tanka; have survived in the Man'yōshū. These poems were probably composed in the early Tenpyō era (729–749), a conclusion arrived at based on the ordering of the poems.

His poetry has been noted for its elegant description of natural scenery.

Man'yōgana	Modern Japanese text	Reconstructed Old Japanese	Modern Japanese	English translation
吉野尓有 夏實之河乃 川余杼尓 鴨曽鳴成 山影尓之弖	吉野なる 夏実の川の 川よどに 鴨そ鳴くなる 山影にして	yosinwo n aru natumwi no kapa no kapayodo ni kamo so naku naru yamakage nisite	Yoshino naru Natsumi no kawa no Kawayodo ni Kamo so naku naru Yamakage ni shite	From the river pools At Natsumi in Yoshino, From those quiet pools Comes the sound of mallards crying Beneath the shadow of the hills.

Edwin A. Cranston compared this poem to the poem Prince Yuhara's father composed on the twilight in the reeds at Naniwa (MYS I : 64).

Man'yōgana	Modern Japanese text	Reconstructed Old Japanese	Modern Japanese	English translation
暮月夜 心毛思努尓 白露乃置 此庭尓 蟋蟀鳴毛	夕月夜 心もしのに 白露の置く この庭に こほろぎ鳴くも	yupudukuywo kokoro mo sinwo-ni siratuyu no oku ko no nipa ni koporogi naku mo	Yoshino naru Natsumi no kawa no Kawayodo ni Kamo so naku naru Yamakage ni shite	The evening moon shines- Here in the garden white with dew The crickets sing, alas! Burthening my weary heart.

He also composed banquet songs, like the following:

蜻蛉羽の
袖振る妹を
玉匣
奥に思ふを
見給へあが君

His sōmon romantic exchanges with "a young woman" show his spontaneity and wit as a poet.

Along with Ōtomo no Sakanoue no Iratsume, he was one of the poets who introduced the new poetic style of the Tenpyō era, and exerted some influence on the poetry of Ōtomo no Yakamochi.

== Works cited ==
- Cranston, Edwin A. (1998). The Gem-Glistening Cup. Stanford: Stanford University Press. ISBN 978-0-804-73157-7.
- Frellesvig, Bjarke; Horn, Stephen Wright; Russell, Kerri L.; Sells, Peter (2017). "The Oxford Corpus of Old Japanese". Oxford University Faculty of Oriental Studies website. Oxford University.
- Haga, Norio (1994). "Yuhara no Ōkimi" 湯原王. Asahi Nihon Rekishi Jinbutsu Jiten (in Japanese). Asahi Shinbun-sha.
- Kojima, Noriyuki; Kinoshita, Masatoshi; Satake, Akahiro (1971). Nihon Koten Bungaku Zenshū Vol. 2; Man'yōshū 1 日本古典文学全集２ 萬葉集一 (in Japanese). Tokyo: Shogakukan. ISBN 4-09-657002-8.
