= Onoshi no Tamori =

Nara-period Japanese noble and poet

Onoshi no Tamori (小野氏淡理) was a Japanese noble and waka poet in the Nara period.

== Biography ==
The details of the life of Onoshi no Tamori are unknown. He was likely a member of the Ono clan. In Tenpyō 2 (730) he participated in a plum blossom-viewing party at the residence of Ōtomo no Tabito, then the governor (一大宰帥 ichi Dazai no sochi) of the Dazaifu.

Yūkichi Takeda's Man'yōshū Zenchūshaku (万葉集全註釈) speculates that he may have been the same person as the Ono no Tamori who served as ambassador (ja) to Parhae.

== Poetry ==
Poem 846 in the Man'yōshū is attributed to him.

Man'yōgana

可須美多都
那我岐波流卑乎
可謝勢例杼
伊野那都可子岐
烏梅能波那可毛

Modern Japanese text

霞立つ
長き春日を
かざせれど
いやなつかしき
梅の花かも

Reconstructed Old Japanese

Modern Japanese

kasumi tatsu
nagaki haruhi o
kazaseredo
iya natsukashiki
ume no hana kamo

English translation

== See also ==
- Reiwa
