= Ono no Kunikata =

Japanese noble and waka poet

Ono no Kunikata (小野国堅) was a Japanese noble and waka poet in the Nara period.

== Biography ==
The details of the life of Ono no Kunikata are largely unknown. He was likely a member of the Ono clan. In Tenpyō 2 (730) he participated in a plum blossom-viewing party at the residence of Ōtomo no Tabito, then the governor (一大宰帥, ichi dazai no sochi) of the Dazaifu. He was probably an officer of the Dazaifu.

Shakyō-shi shishō records from the Tenpyō 10s (25 January 738 – 3 February 747 in the Julian calendar) indicate that he was of the upper toneri dai-soi. These are Volumes 2, 7, 8, and 9 of the Dai-Nihon Komonjo.

== Poetry ==
Poem 844 in the Man'yōshū is attributed to him.

Man'yōgana	Modern Japanese text	Reconstructed Old Japanese	Modern Japanese	English translation
伊母我陛邇 由岐可母不流登 弥流麻提尓 許々陀母麻我不 烏梅能波奈可毛	妹が家に 雪かも降ると 見るまでに ここだもまがふ 梅の花かも		imo ga e ni yuki kamo furu to miru madeni koko da mo magau ume no hana kamo

== See also ==
- Reiwa
