= Egyō (Nara period) =

Japanese Buddhist monk and waka poet

Egyō (恵行) was a Japanese Buddhist monk, preacher and waka poet in the Nara period. He was active around 750 in the area of modern Toyama Prefecture. Only one of his poems is extant, preserved in Book XIX of the Man'yōshū as part of a poetic exchange with Ōtomo no Yakamochi.

== Biography ==
Very little is known about the biography of the figure known as Egyō. The Man'yōshū records that he was a teacher or deliverer of sermons (講師僧 kōshisō) in Etchū Province as of the second year of Tenpyō Shōhō (750 in the western calendar). This title of kōshisō may anachronistically be synonymous with kokushi, a teacher stationed in the kokubun-ji in each of the provinces, who were known as kōshi starting in Enryaku 14 (795). The Nihon Koten Bungaku Zenshū speculates that the title was already in used generally before that date.

The historian Sekiyo Shimode, in a 1989 paper in Sundai Shigaku (駿台史学), speculated based on this that Egyō held a relatively high rank within the priesthood but that, based on the terms of respect preserved in his surviving poem (see below), he nevertheless felt Ōtomo no Yakamochi to be his superior with the secular society of court.

== Poetry ==
Poem 4204 in the Man'yōshū (Book XIX) is attributed to him.

Man'yōgana	Modern Japanese text	Modern Japanese	English translation
吾勢故我 捧而持流 保寶我之婆 安多可毛似加 青盖	我が背子が 捧げて持てる ほほがしは あたかも似るか 青き蓋	wa ga seko ga sasagete moteru hohogashiha ataka mo niru ka aoki kinugasa	That magnolia, which my lord doth bear, verily, it resembles a verdant umbrella of silk.

Composed on the 12th day of the fourth month of Tenpyō Shōhō 2 (21 May 750 in the Julian calendar), this is one of two poems in the anthology that mentions the whitebark magnolia (hohogashiha, modern Japanese hōnoki), the other being the one immediately following it, which was composed by Ōtomo no Yakamochi. Egyō's simile, comparing the flower to a kinugasa, a kind of umbrella raised behind a member of the nobility, was meant as a greeting for Yakamochi. The expression ataka mo niru is reminiscent of kanshi, poetry that educated Japanese composed in Classical Chinese.
