= Kadobe no Iwatari =

Kadobe no Iwatari (門部石足) was a Japanese waka poet in the Nara period.

== Biography ==
Little is known of the life of Kadobe no Iwatari. His kabane was Muraji. In Tenpyō 1 (729) he was working as an official in Chikuzen. The following year he participated in a plum blossom-viewing party at the residence of Ōtomo no Tabito, then the governor (一大宰帥 ichi Dazai no sochi) of Dazaifu.

== Poetry ==
Poems 568 and 845 in the Man'yōshū are attributed to him.

| Man'yōgana | Modern Japanese text | Reconstructed Old Japanese | Modern Japanese | English translation |
|---|---|---|---|---|
| 宇具比須能 麻知迦弖尓勢斯 宇米我波奈 知良須阿利許曽 意母布故我多米 | 鴬の 待ちかてにせし 梅が花 散らずありこそ 思ふ子がため | | uguisu no machikate ni seshi ume ga hana chirazu ari koso omou ko ga tame |

== See also ==
- Reiwa
