= Hanishi no Mimichi =

Japanese nobleman of the Nara period

Hanishi no Mimichi (土師水道, 土師氏御道 or 土師水通, also known by the courtesy name Hanishi no Shibimaro 土師乃志婢麿) was a Japanese nobleman and waka poet in the Nara period.

== Biography ==
The details of the life of the poet Hanishi no Mimichi are not well documented. Four poems in the famous waka anthology the Man'yōshū are attributed to him, with his name being written in various styles in the notes attached to these poems. His given name is written as 水道 ("water-road") in the attribution of poems 557 and 558 in Book IV, but at 御道 ("august-road") for 843 in Book V.

His kabane was Sukune.

His court position is not indicated in the collection, so he was likely of low rank. The note attached to poem 3845 in Book XVI describes him as ōtoneri.

In Tenpyō 2 (730) he participated in a plum blossom-viewing party at the residence of Ōtomo no Tabito, then the governor (一大宰帥 ichi Dazai no sochi) of the Dazaifu.

== Poetry ==
Poems 557, 558, 843 and 3844 in the Man'yōshū are attributed to him. The first pair of poems, included in Book V of the collection, were written on a sea voyage from his posting in Tsukushi to the capital, expressing his pining for his feeling of loneliness without his wife and his desire to see her as soon as possible. In his commentary on the poems, Mizue Aso noted the use of taboo language, apparently deliberately so, to emphasize the sincerity of the poet's emotions.

Man'yōgana	Modern Japanese text	Reconstructed Old Japanese	Modern Japanese	English translation
大船乎 榜乃進尓 磐尓觸 覆者覆 妹尓因而者	大船を 漕ぎの進みに 岩に触れ 覆らば覆れ 妹によりては		ōfuna o kogi no susumi ni iwa ni fure kaeraba kaere imo ni yorite wa	As, in our great vessel, we set sail out to sea, if we should run into rocks and keel over then let it be so if it means I can return the sooner, that I can see my love again.

Man'yōgana	Modern Japanese text	Reconstructed Old Japanese	Modern Japanese	English translation
神之社尓 神之社尓 我挂師 幣者将賜 妹尓不相國	ちはやぶる 神の社に わが懸けし 幣は賜らむ 妹に逢はなくに		chihayaburu kami no yashiro ni wa ga kakeshi nusa wa tabaran imo ni awanakuni	That offering I made at the holy shrine of the fierce and raging gods— I will be wanting it back, for I was not able to meet my love.

The last of Mimichi's poems in the collection's ordering (which is not strictly chronological across books), 3844, is of uncertain date. Akira Nakamura, in his article on Mimichi for the Man'yōshū Kajin Jiten dates the poem to Mimichi's later years after returning to the Capital, based on stylistic differences with the earlier poems quoted above.

== See also ==
- Reiwa
