= Abe no Hironiwa =

Japanese waka and kanshi poet

Abe no Hironiwa (安倍広庭, also written 阿倍広庭) was a Japanese waka and kanshi poet during the Nara period.

== Biography ==
Abe no Hironiwa was born in 659. He was the son of Abe no Miushi.

In the first year of Jinki (724) he oversaw the funerary rites for Ishikawa no Ōnu-hime (石川大蕤比売).

Hironiwa died in 732, on the 22nd day of the second month. At the time of his death he was 74 by Japanese reckoning.

== Poetry ==
Two of his kanshi (poems in Classical Chinese) were included in the Kaifūsō, and four of his waka (poetry in Classical Japanese) were included in the Man'yōshū.
