= Takahashi no Mushimaro =

Japanese poet

Takahashi no Mushimaro (高橋虫麻呂, fl. ca 730) was a Japanese poet of the early 8th century.

He was a contemporary of Yamabe no Akahito, Yamanoue no Okura and Ōtomo no Tabito, and was known for his poems on travel and a collection of local myths and legends. Little is known about his life. He was a low-ranking court official serving in Nara and in some northeastern provinces.

His poetry is well represented in Man'yōshū: the poems numbered 321, 971, 972, 1497, 1738 through 1760, 1780, 1781, and 1807 through 1811 are attributed to him. It is indicated that most of these were drawn from the "Takahashi no Mushimaro Collection" (高橋虫麻呂集, Takahashi no Mushimaro Shū).
