= Ono no Oyu =

Japanese bureaucrat and poet

Ono no Oyu (小野 老; died 738) was a Japanese bureaucrat and a poet. He served under Ōtomo no Tabito during the Dazaifu administration. He rose to the rank of Assistant Governor-General (daini). Three of his tanka poems have been preserved in the Man'yōshū.

Tanka poem (Man'yōshū, 3:328):
Awoni yoshi
Nara no
Miyako ha
Sakuhana no
Nihofuga gotoku
Ima sakari nari

Translation:

In the beautiful green, here in the capital Nara, spring flowers are now in full bloom.
