= Sano no Chigami no Otome =

8th-century Japanese poet, palace attendant

Sano no Chigami no Otome (Japanese: 狭野茅上 娘子, c.700) was a Japanese poet during the Nara period, whose love poems appear in the Man’yōshū, the oldest existing anthology of Japanese vernacular poetry. A low-ranking palace attendant, she was also known as Sano no Otogami no Otome (狭野弟上 娘子).

The Man'yōshū features 63 love poems she exchanged with her lover, Nakatomi no Yakamori. He was sent into exile to Echizen province after they were discovered having a clandestine affair while she was in service at Saigūryō, the Bureau of the Princess Imperial Deputy of the Grand Shrine at Ise. The court ladies attached to the office were prohibited from having relationships with men.

She is credited with writing 23 of the love poems, which appear in Book XV. Sano no Chigami is ranked third among women poets featured in Man'yōshū, by number of poems contributed. Her poems are arranged together with the verses by Nakatomi no Yakamori, in the sōmonka or "inquiry and answer" format. Characterized as "intense and deeply moving", her poetry is generally considered more "openly revealing" and somewhat superior to his.

In her most famous poem (15/3724), Sano no Chigami “expresses her desire to burn up the road he must take from her and so prevent his departure.”

== See also ==
- Man'yōshū
- List of Man'yōshū poets
