= Abe no Iratsume =

Abe no Iratsume (阿倍女郎 or 安倍女郎; dates unknown) was a Japanese waka poet of the Nara period.

== Biography ==
The exact birth and death dates of Abe no Iratsume (literally, "the lady of the Abe") are unknown, but she likely lived from around the Wadō era (began 708) to around the Hōki era (ended 780).

== Poetry ==
Abe no Iratsume is credited as the author of five poems included in books III and IV of the Man'yōshū. They are poems numbered 269, 505–506, 514, and 516. These include a poetic exchange with Nakatomi no Azumahito, the author of poem 515.

An "Abe no Iratsume" (安倍女郎) is mentioned as the recipient of poem 1631 (Book VIII) by Ōtomo no Yakamochi, but this was probably another woman.
