= Minari (disambiguation) =

Minari is a 2020 American film that follows a South Korean immigrant family in rural 1980s United States.

Minari may also refer to:

- Korean name for Oenanthe javanica, commonly known as "Java waterdropwort"
  - Minari (soundtrack), the soundtrack album to the eponymous 2020 Korean-American film
- Minari Engineering, defunct British car manufacturer
- Izumo-Minari Station, train station in Okuizumo, Nita District, Shimane Prefecture, Japan
- Quartiere Minari, subdivision (frazioni) of the comune of Torrile, Italy
- Minari Endoh, author of the Japanese manga series Dazzle
- Elisa Minari, Italian bassist of the band Nomadi
- Ōtabe no Minari, Japanese poet during the Nara period who is featured in the Man'yōshū
