= Nakatomi no Iratsume =

Japanese noblewoman and poet

Nakatomi no Iratsume (中臣女郎) was a Japanese noblewoman and waka poet of the Nara period.

== Biography ==
Nakatomi no Iratsume's birth and death dates are unknown, as is her true given name. (Iratsume means "young woman" or "daughter".)

She was one of the many women around Ōtomo no Yakamochi.

== Poetry ==
Poems 675, 676, 677, 678, and 679 in the Man'yōshū are attributed to her. These five poems were sōmon-ka sent to Yakamochi.
