= Ruijū Karin =

Japanese waka anthology

The Ruijū Karin (類聚歌林) was a Japanese waka anthology compiled by Yamanoue no Okura.

== Compilation and date ==
The Ruijū Karin was compiled by Yamanoue no Okura. It was likely compiled after Yōrō 5 (721) when Okura become a tutor to the crown prince (later Emperor Shōmu).

== Title ==
The work's title has been translated into English as:

- The Grove of Poetry, Arranged by Topic
- Forest of Classified Verse
- Forest of Classified Verses
- The Grove of Poems Classified
- Classified Forest of Poetry
- Classified Forest of Verse

== Status and apparent contents ==
The work is now lost.

It apparently survived until around the end of the Heian period. The late-Heian books of poetic criticism Yakumo Mishō and Fukuro-zōshi record that copies of it were in the holdings of Byōdō-in and/or Hōjō-ji), and in addition to these works it was also mentioned in a diary entry from 1015 (永承五年四月二十六日前麗景殿女御延子歌絵合, 正子内親王絵合), Ōgishō (奥義抄), Fujiwara no Shunzei's Korai Fūteishō, Waka Genzaisho Mokuroku (和歌現在書目録), Waka Iroha, but none of these works quote it directly.

Its contents are now known only from nine fragmentary passages quoted in books I, II and IX the Man'yōshū, as a source of information poets and the circumstances of composition of poems, and its full contents are unknown. The number of books which comprised the anthology is unknown, although the Shōsōin supposedly included a Karin Nanakan (歌林七巻) copied by Prince Ichihara which, if it was the same as this work, would mean it consisted of seven books.

The work divided poems into categories based on some sort of criteria and, using resources such as the Nihon Shoki and Fudoki, investigated the circumstances under which its poems were composed. As far as the Man'yōshū tells us, it apparently included poems by emperors and members of the imperial family, as well as court poems such as those commemorating imperial processions to various parts of the country (行幸従駕 gyōkō-jūga). This has led to the theory that it was compiled to be presented to the crown prince.

It may have been modeled on the Chinese work Yiwen Leiju.
