= Ōtomo no Sakanoue no Ōiratsume =

Ōtomo no Sakanoue no Ōiratsume bzw. Ōotome (大伴坂上大嬢) was a Japanese noblewoman and waka poet of the Nara period. Eleven of her poems were included in the Man'yōshū, specifically the ones numbered 581–584, 729–731, 735, 737–738, 1624. She was a daughter of Ōtomo no Sukunamaro and Ōtomo no Sakanoue no Iratsume. Her older half-sister was Ōtomo no Tamura no Ōiratsume and she was a younger cousin and wife of Ōtomo no Yakamochi. Her family background is given in a left note to poem 759 of the Man'yōshū.
