= Fujiwara no Iratsume =

Fujiwara no Iratsume (藤原郎女; dates unknown) was a Japanese noblewoman and waka poet of the Nara period.

== Biography ==
Fujiwara no Iratsume's birth and death dates are unknown, as is her actual given name. (Iratsume means "young woman" or "daughter".)

The Man'yōshū Kogi (万葉集古義) speculates that she was the daughter of Fujiwara no Maro and perhaps Ōtomo no Sakanoue no Iratsume.

== Poetry ==
Poem 766 in the Man'yōshū is attributed to her.
