= Heguri-uji no Iratsume =

Heguri-uji no Iratsume (平群氏女郎) was a Japanese waka poet of the Nara period.

== Poetry ==
Poems 3931–3942 of the Man'yōshū are attributed to her. All 12 of them are tanka. She sent this group of poems to Ōtomo no Yakamochi around Tenpyō 18 (746), when he was governor of Etchū Province.

‘A thousand years, you said,

As our two hearts melted.

I look at the hand you held

And the ache is too hard to bear'
