= Tanabe no Sakimaro =

Tanabe no Sakimaro (田辺福麻呂; dates unknown) was a Japanese waka poet of the Nara period.

== Biography ==
The year of Tanabe no Sakimaro's birth is unknown. His kabane was Fuhito (史).

He may have acted as a court poet to the imperial household, similarly to Kakinomoto no Hitomaro and Yamabe no Akahito.

It is unknown when he died.

== Poetry ==
A total of 44 poems of Sakimaro's are included in the Man'yōshū, including those directly attributed to him and those taken from the Tanabe no Sakimaro no Kashū). Of these, 10 are chōka and 34 tanka. The poems attributed to him directly are all tanka, and are those numbered 4032, 4033, 4034, 4035, 4036, 4038, 4039, 4040, 4041, 4042, 4046, 4049, 4052, 4056, 4057, 4058, 4059, 4060, 4061, and 4062 (Note: 4056–4062 are treated by the compilers as traditional attributions.)
