= Dazaifu =

Dazaifu may refer to:

- Dazaifu, Fukuoka, a city in northern Kyūshū
- Dazaifu (government), the regional government in northern Kyūshū
