= Ikusa no Ōkimi =

Japanese poet

Ikusa no Ōkimi (軍王; fl. ca.7th century) was a waka poet of Japan's Yamato period.

== Biography ==
His birth and death years are unknown. He may have been active during the reign of Emperor Monmu (697–707).

His entire biography is a mystery. He was previously thought, based on the placement of two of his waka in the Man'yōshū, to have been a figure of Emperor Jomei's time (629–641), but his poetic style appears to be that of someone writing after the time of Kakinomoto no Hitomaro, and there are also problems with the name Ikusa no Ōkimi.

The traditional reading Ikusa no Ōkimi is the intuitive reading for the characters used in the Man'yōshū to write his name, and implies he was an imperial prince who was given the name Ikusa, but normally such names were given to princes based on the clan name of the one who raised them or from a place name, and the name Ikusa is otherwise unattested in such contexts. In the Nihon Shoki, however, the kings of Baekje are referred to with the semantically similar characters 軍君 (read Konikishi or Konkishi). For this reason, the theory that his name should instead be read Konikishi and that he was the same person as Buyeo Pung, who came to Japan during Jomei's reign and returned to Baekje in 661, has been proposed, but even this theory presents chronological and stylistic problems.

== Poetry ==
His rhetorical style appears to be in imitation that of Kakinomoto no Hitomaro. His poetry appears to deify the emperor in a manner that reflects a post-Taika Reform imperial ideology, for example his tōtsu kami waga ōkimi (遠つ神我が大君).

His employment of strict 5-7 rhythm resembles later Man'yō poets more than those who are known to have been active in the first half of the seventh century. The same is true of the relationship between his chōka (long poem) and its envoy and his use of rhetorical devices like makura-kotoba and jo-kotoba.

== Works cited ==
- Inaoka, Kōji (1983). "Ikusa no Ōkimi". Nihon Koten Bungaku Daijiten 日本古典文学大辞典 (in Japanese). Vol. 1. Tokyo: Iwanami Shoten. pp. 119–120. OCLC 11917421.
