= Saeki no Akamaro =

Japanese waka poet

Saeki no Akamaro (佐伯赤麻呂) was a Japanese waka poet of the Nara period.

== Biography ==
His birth and death dates are unknown, as are all details of his life. His kabane was Sukune.

One theory holds that he was the same person as the more famous Saeki no Kiyomaro.

== Poetry ==
Several of his poems survive in the Man'yōshū, specifically in two poetic exchanges he had with his daughter (who is unnamed), in which his poems are those numbered 405 and 628. One other tanka of his was included in the collection, as number 630. He is considered a poet of the "fourth period" of the Man'yōshū.

== Cited works ==
- "Saeki no Akamaro" 佐伯赤麻呂. Nihon Jinmei Daijiten Plus (in Japanese). Kodansha. 2015.
- Taira, Toshikatsu (1986). "Akamaro". In Inukai, Kiyoshi; Inoue, Muneo; Ōkubo, Tadashi; Ono, Hiroshi; Tanaka, Yutaka; Hashimoto, Fumio; Fujihira, Haruo (eds.). Waka Daijiten (in Japanese). Tokyo: Meiji Shoin. p. 6. ISBN 4-625-40029-5.
