= Abe no Kooji =

Abe no Kooji (安倍子祖父) was a Japanese courtier and waka poet of the Nara period.

== Biography ==
The birth and death dates of the courtier and poet known as Abe no Kooji are unknown. His kabane was Ason. He was an imperial attendant (大舎人 ōtoneri) in the service of Prince Toneri. Kamochi Masazumi's Man'yōshū Kogi (万葉集古義) speculates that he was the same person as Hiketa no Kooji (引田朝臣子祖父 Hiketa no Ason Kooji).

== Poetry ==
Poems 3838 and 3839 in the Man'yōshū are attributed to him. He presented the poems to Prince Toneri, for which he received a payment of 2,000 mon.

Man'yōgana	Modern Japanese text	Reconstructed Old Japanese	Modern Japanese	English translation
吾妹兒之 額尓生流 雙六乃 事負乃牛之 倉上之瘡	我妹子が 額に生ふる 双六の こと負の牛の 鞍の上の瘡		wagimoko ga hitai ni ouru suguroku no kotoi no ushi no kura no ue no kasa

Man'yōgana	Modern Japanese text	Reconstructed Old Japanese	Modern Japanese	English translation
吾兄子之 犢鼻尓為流 都夫礼石之 吉野乃山尓 氷魚曽懸有 (佐我礼流)	我が背子が 犢鼻にする つぶれ石の 吉野の山に 氷魚ぞ下がれる		waga seko ga tafusagi ni suru tsubure-ishi no yoshino no yama ni hio zo sagareru
