= Sengaku =

Japanese Buddhist monk and poet

- Title: Buddhist monk

Personal life
- Born: 1203 Hitachi, Japan
- Died: circa 1273

Religious life
- Religion: Buddhism
- School: Tendai

Sengaku (仙覚; 1203 – c. 1273) was a Japanese Buddhist monk of the Tendai school. He was a scholar, editor and a literary critic.

His major work, Man'yōshū chūshaku, was completed in 1269. This was a treatise on the collected poems in the Man'yōshū anthology. His work was instrumental in a process of rediscovering the original meaning of this seminal work of Japanese poetry.

== Selected work ==
Sengaku's published writings encompass 9 works in 12 publications in 1 language and 53 library holdings.

- Man'ʼyōshū chūshaku (萬葉集註釋) (1269); Man'ʼyōshū chūshaku: Sengaku shō, Ninnaji zō (萬葉集註釋: 仙覺抄, 仁和寺藏) Akihiro Satake, ed. (1981). ISBN 9784653005889; OCLC 23315980
- Man'yōshū (萬葉集) (1709) OCLC 069224675
