= Ōtomo no Sakanoue no Iratsume =

Japanese noblewoman and poet

Ōtomo no Sakanoue no Iratsume (大伴坂上郎女; c. 695–750), also known as Lady Ōtomo of Sakanoue, was a Japanese noblewoman and waka poet of the early-to-mid Nara period, best known for the inclusion of 84 of her poems in the Man'yōshū. She was the aunt of Ōtomo no Yakamochi.

== Life ==
Ōtomo no Sakanoue no Iratsume was born c. 695 to the powerful and influential Ōtomo clan. A daughter of Ōtomo no Yasumaro and Lady Ishikawa, she was the younger half-sister of Ōtomo no Tabito, Ōtomo no Tanushi, and Ōtomo no Sukunamaro. As is customary for the time period, her personal name is unknown, and her title is taken from Sakanoue, the village in which she resided; ‘Iratsume’ is an archaic moniker for ‘young lady,’ ‘maiden,’ or ‘daughter’.

In her early teens, she married Prince Hozumi; after his early death in 715, she would go on to marry Fujiwara no Maro, son of Fujiwara no Fuhito. After the death of her second husband, she married her older half-brother, Ōtomo no Sukunamaro, and would have at least two daughters with him, Ōtomo no Sakanoue no Ōiratsume and Ōtomo no Sakanoue no Otōiratsume.

Widowed for yet a third time, in 728 she would join the household of her eldest brother, Ōtomo no Tabito, then the administrator-commander of the Dazaifu, the regional government of Kyushu. Donald Keene and Yutaka Tsuchihashi both speculate that Tabito sent for Lady Ōtomo no Sakanoue to educate his son, Ōtomo no Yakamochi. Other suggested reasons for her summons include becoming Tabito's mistress or spouse, or replacing Tabito's recently deceased wife in performing religious ceremonies for the Ōtomo clan.

After her brother’s death in 731, Sakanoue became the de facto head of the Ōtomo house and would manage its affairs until her nephew Yakamochi came of age. Yakamochi would later go on to marry Sakanoue’s eldest daughter, Ōiratsume.

== Family ==
Parents

- Father: Ōtomo no Yasumaro (大伴安麻呂, d. 21 June 714)
- Mother: Ishikawa no Iratsume (石川 内命婦)

Spouse(s) and issues

- First Husband: Prince Hozumi (穂積親王, d. 30 August 715), son of Emperor Tenmu
  - First Son: Prince Kamido (上道王, d. 28 April 727)
  - Second Son: Prince Sakaibe (境部王)
- Second Husband: Fujiwara no Maro (藤原 麻呂, 695 – 17 August 737), son of Fujiwara no Fuhito (藤原不比等)
- Third Husband: Ōtomo no Sukunamaro (大伴宿奈麻呂), her half-brother
  - First Daughter: Ōtomo no Sakanoue no Ōiratsume (大伴坂上大嬢), Wife of Ōtomo no Yakamochi (大伴 家持)
  - Second Daughter: Ōtomo no Sakanoue no Otōiratsume (大伴坂上二嬢), Wife of Ōtomo no Surugamaro (大伴駿河麻呂)

== Poetic works ==
Ōtomo no Sakanoue is the foremost female poet of the Man'yōshū, and the third-best represented overall, regardless of gender, having a total of 84 poems included in the collection. Her nephew, Ōtomo no Yakamochi, is thought to be one of the primary compilers of the Man’yoshu. Paula Doe suggests that, as his mentor, Sakanoue exerted considerable influence on his early poetry and literary sensibility, evident in his choice to include so many examples of her work.

Sakanoue’s 84 extant poems are 77 tanka, 6 chōka, and 1 sedōka. Several of her poems are noted by epigraphs to have been composed while performing religious rites on behalf of her house. Her longest, a banka (an elegy in chōka form), was composed upon the death of the Korean nun Rigan, who had been a guest of the Ōtomo household since Sakanoue’s youth.

Other poems of note are her collection of sōmon, tanka “poems conveying feelings to another,” which document her exchanges with some of her husbands, lovers, and friends. Finally, several of her poems were either addressed to or written about her daughters, touching upon the sentiments between parent and child. One of her longer works is addressed to Ōiratsume, expressing how much she missed her daughter.

== Sources ==
- Doe, Paula (1982). A Warbler's Song in the Dusk: The Life and Work of Ōtomo Yakamochi (718-785). University of California Press. pp. 68-95. ISBN 978-0-520-04346-6.
- Frédéric, Louis (2002) [1st pub. Éditions Robert Laffont: 1996]. Japan Encyclopedia. Translated by Roth, Käthe. Cambridge, MA: Harvard University Press: Belknap Press Imprint. ISBN 978-0674007703.
- Horton, H. Mack (2015). "Part I - The ancient period (beginnings to 794) - Ch. 5: The Man'yōshū". In Shirane, Haruo; Suzuki, Tomi; Lurie, David (eds.). The Cambridge History of Japanese Literature. Cambridge University Press. pp. 42–74. doi:10.1017/CHO9781139245869. ISBN 9781316368282.
- JCTC, Japanese Classics Translation Committee (2005) [1st pub. Iwanami Shoten: 1940]. 1000 Poems from the Manyoshu: The Complete Nippon Gakujutsu Shinkokai Translation. Mineola, NY: Dover Publications. ISBN 978-0486439594.
- Keene, Donald (1999). Seeds in the Heart: Japanese Literature from Earliest Times to the Late Sixteenth Century. New York, NY: Columbia University Press. ISBN 9780231114417.
- Kojima, Takashi (1995). Written on Water: Five Hundred Poems from the Man'yōshū. Rutland, VT: Tuttle Publishing. ISBN 978-0804820400.
- Levy, Ian Hideo (1981). The Ten Thousand Leaves: A Translation of the Man'yōshū, Japan's Premier Anthology of Classical Poetry (PDF). Princeton, NJ: Princeton University Press. ISBN 9780691064529.
- McAuley, Thomas (October 28, 2015). "Lady Otomo of Sakanoue". Waka Poetry (WordPress). Great Britain Sasakawa Foundation.
- Rexroth, Kenneth; Atsumi, Ikuko (1982) [1st pub. Seabury Press: 1977]. Women Poets of Japan. New York, NY: New Directions Publishing. ISBN 978-0811208208.
- Sato, Hiroaki (2015) [1st pub. M. E. Sharpe: 2008]. Japanese Women Poets. New York, NY: Routledge. ISBN 9781317466970.
- Tottori Prefectural Government (October 19, 2019). "The Province of Inaba: Ōtomo no Yakamochi" (PDF). Tottori Prefecture Website. Tottori Prefectural Government.
- Tsuchihashi, Yutaka (1978). Manyo Kaigan. Shibuya, Tokyo: NHK Publishing.
