= Princess Awata =

Princess Awata (粟田女王 Awata-no-ōkimi or Awata-no-joō) was a Japanese princess and waka poet of the Nara period.

== Biography ==
The date of Princess Awata's birth is unknown.

She served the retired Empress Genshō. In Tenpyō-hōji 5 (761), at a shū-kisai ceremony (周忌斎会) for the late empress, she held the Junior Third Rank, and was later promoted to the Senior Third Rank.

She died on the fourth day of the fifth month of Tenpyō-hōji 8 (7 June 764 in the Julian calendar).

== Poetry ==
One of her waka was included in the Man'yōshū. It was the poem numbered 4060, and she composed it at a poetic gathering at the residence of Tachibana no Moroe.
