= Omina no Chichihaha =

Omina no Chichihaha (女之父母) is a description used in the Man'yōshū, a classical Japanese waka anthology, for the authors of poem 3815 (Note: 白玉之 緒絶者信 雖然 其緒又貫 人持去家有) contained therein. The "name" translates to "the woman's father and mother", and their poem was a reply to the young man who wrote 3814, (Note: 真珠者 緒絶為尓伎登 聞之故尓 其緒復貫 吾玉尓将為) requesting the hand of their recently divorced daughter in marriage. They wrote to him that, unfortunately, their daughter had already left to marry someone else.

Michiaki Nihei has compared the anecdote recounted by these two poems and the surrounding notes) (Note: 3814: 右傳云 時有娘子 夫君見棄改適他氏也 于時或有壮士 不知改適此歌贈 遣請誂於女之父母者 於是父母之意壮士未聞委曲之旨 乃作彼歌報送以顕改適之縁也 3815: 右傳云 時有娘子 夫君見棄改適他氏也 于時或有壮士 不知改適此歌贈 遣請誂於女之父母者 於是父母之意壮士未聞委曲之旨 乃作彼歌報送以顕改適之縁也) to chapter 24 of the Tales of Ise.
