= Mibu no Udamaro =

Japanese nobleman and waka poet

Mibu no Udamaro (壬生宇太麿 or 壬生宇太麻呂) was a Japanese nobleman and waka poet in the Nara period.

== Biography ==
Mibu no Udamaro, a nobleman and waka poet, was active in the Nara period. His name, Udamaro is variously written 宇太麿, 宇陁麿, 宇太麻呂, 宇多麻呂, 宇陁麻呂, 宇陀麻呂, or 宇太万呂. His kabane was Omi (使主). His birth and death years are unknown.

One early document (Note: Book I of the Dai-Nihon Komonjo, one of the Shōsōin texts.) records that in the sixth year of Tenpyō (734) he was sent to Izumo Province as a lesser secretary (少外記 shō-geki) and scribe of government documents (公文使録事) in service of the kuni no miyatsuko, when he was of the Senior Seventh Rank, Upper Grade and held the 12th Class in the order of merit (勲十二等). The Man'yōshū indicates that two years later, in the second month of Tenpyō 8 (Note: This month lasted from 17 March to 15 April 736 in the Julian calendar.), he was dispatched to Silla as a Senior Magistrate (大判官), at which time he was of the Junior Sixth Rank, Upper Grade. The position of Senior Magistrate was third in importance, surpassed only by Ambassador (大使) and Vice-Ambassador (副使). On the way to Silla, his ship made stop-offs at such places as Nagai-no-ura (長井浦) in Higo Province, Kara-no-tomari (韓亭) and Hikitsu-no-tomari (引津亭) in Chikuzen Province, and Takeshiki-no-ura (竹敷浦) in Tsushima, where he composed his poetry. In the first month of the following year, he returned to Japan.

In the fourth month of Tenpyō 10 (Note: 24 April to 22 May 738.) he was made vice-governor (介 suke) of Kōzuke Province. and in the fourth month of Tenpyō 18 (Note: 25 April to 24 May 746.) he was made Vice-Governor of the Right (右京亮 ukyō-no-suke). In the fifth month of Tenpyō Shōhō 2 (Note: 9 June to 7 July 750.) he was made governor of Tajima Province.

== Poetry ==
Poems 3612, 3669, 3674, 3675 and 3702 in the Man'yōshū (Book XV) are attributed to Udamaro. Of these five poems, four are tanka and one is a sedōka. The poems he composed on his way to Silla are all straightforward expressions of the mood of the journey.
