= Sami Mansei =

Sami Mansei (沙弥満誓; "novice Mansei", flourished circa 720), was a Japanese Buddhist priest and poet. Little is known of his life except that his secular name was Kasa no Ason Maro. While serving at a temple in the north of Kyūshū, he was a member of Ōtomo no Tabito's literary coterie. His few surviving pieces are collected in the Man'yōshū.

Mansei is famous for the following waka poem from the Manyoshu: Yononaka-wo Nani-ni Tatohemu Asa-biraki Kogi-inishi Fune-no Ato-naki-gotoshi which means All are to disappear, just as the morning boat wake does.
