= Takechi no Kurohito =

Takechi no Kurohito (高市黒人) was a Japanese waka poet of the Nara period.

== Biography ==
The year of Takechi no Kurohito's birth is unknown. His kabane was Muraji.

He appears to have spent his career as a low-ranking civil servant.

It is unknown when he died.

== Poetry ==
16 poems in the Man'yōshū are attributed to him, all of them tanka. The poems are those numbered 58, 70, 270–277, 279–280, 283, 305, (Note: Attributed by some texts to Shōben.) 1718, and 4016.
