= Kasa no Kanamura =

Kasa no Kanamura (笠 金村; dates unknown) was a Japanese waka poet of the Nara period.

== Biography ==
The date of Kasa no Kanamura's birth and death is unknown.

However he is said to have been active from fl.715-733.

== Poetry ==
Some 46 poems in the Man'yōshū are attributed to Kanamura: 230–232, 233–234, 364–365, 366–367, 368, 369, 543–545, 546–548, 907–909, 910–912, 920–922, 928–930, 935–937, 950–953, 1453–1455, 1532–1533, 1785–1786, and 1787–1789. Of these, sixteen—230, 231, 232, 233, 234, 368, 369, 950, 951, 952, 953, 1785, 1786, 1787, 1788, and 1789—are cited to the Kasa no Asomi Kanamura no Kashū (笠朝臣金村歌集). 233 and 234 are attributed to him by some manuscripts, but not others.

Susumu Nakanishi tentatively takes his eulogy for Prince Shiki, composed in 715, as the beginning of his poetic career. He acted as a court poet to the imperial household.
