= Kaifūsō =

Most ancient collection of Chinese poetry written by Japanese poets

The Kaifūsō (懐風藻; Florilegium of Cherished Airs) is the earliest extant anthology of literary Sinitic poetry (kanshi) written by Japanese poets.

It was compiled in 751. In the brief introduction of the poets, the unknown writer seems sympathetic to Emperor Kōbun and his regents who were overthrown in 672 by Emperor Tenmu after only eight months of rule. Thus, it has been traditionally credited to Ōmi no Mifune (722–785), a great grandson of Emperor Kōbun. It also has been said that Fujii no Hironari (n.d., fl. first half of 8th century) and Isonokami no Yakatsugu (729–781) could be the compiler.

The kanji 藻 (sō) in the title means "water-plant", which is a metaphor for elegant style. The work is a collection of 120 works by 64 poets written in the elegant style of poetry built on Tang dynasty models in the eighth century. Most of the poets are imperial family members, court officials and monks, such as Prince Ōtsu. Eighteen of the Kaifūsō poets, including Prince Ōtsu, also have poems selected in a later anthology of Japanese poetry, the Man'yōshū. Most poems come from poetry banquets for seasonal festivals, imperial excursions, or banquets hosted for Silla envoys.

At the time the Kaifūsō was written, Sinitic poetry had a higher place in the Japanese literary world than waka, and Chinese characters were used for official documents. Composition in literary Sinitic became widespread during the reign of Emperor Tenji (668–671, r.661–672). In the preface of the Kaifūsō, a distinction is made between the basic technology of writing and the embossed poetry and beautiful prose that arose through, and that completed the regulation and ritual of, the new code-based state. Just as the Wen Xuan preface provided inspiration for the vision of literary history in the Kaifūsō preface, Chinese medieval poetry provided a model of individual authorship and a rich treasury for sophisticated diction.
