= Edwin Cranston =

American academic (1932–2021)

Edwin Augustus Cranston
- Born: Edwin Cranston; October 10, 1932; Pittsfield, Massachusetts, U.S.
- Died: December 8, 2021

Academic background
- Education: University of Arizona; University of California, Berkeley alumni Stanford University

Academic work
- Discipline: Japanese literature

Edwin Augustus Cranston (1932–2021) was a professor of Japanese literature in the Department of East Asian Languages and Cultures at Harvard University. His primary research interest was the classical literature of Japan, especially traditional poetic forms. He received the Japan–U.S. Friendship Commission Prize for the Translation of Japanese Literature in 1992 for his translation A Waka Anthology: The Gem-Glistening Cup. Vol I.

== History ==
Born on October 18, 1932, Cranston was raised on a farm in Pittsfield, Massachusetts, until the age of ten, when he moved to Arizona with his parents. He graduated from Tucson High School and received his B.A. in English from the University of Arizona in Tucson in 1954. He served four years in the United States Navy where he was a journalist and served on the USS Princeton (CV-37). He then began graduate study in 1958 at the University of California at Berkeley. In 1962 he transferred to Stanford University and in 1966 earned a Ph.D. there in Japanese literature. He entered the Harvard University faculty in 1965.

== Contributions to Japan Studies ==
Cranston's career has centered around the translation and writing of poetry.

His dissertation, a translation of and commentary on the Izumi Shikibu diary, was published in 1969 in the Harvard-Yenching Monograph series as The Izumi Shikibu Diary: A Romance of the Heian Court and remains the authoritative English version.

In 1993, Stanford University Press released the first of his proposed six-volume anthology of classical Japanese poetry. Titled A Waka Anthology, Volume One: The Gem-Glistening Cup, it was awarded a prize by the Japan-United States Friendship Commission and followed in 2006 by A Waka Anthology, Volume Two: Grasses of Remembrance. In 2009, he was awarded the Order of the Rising Sun, Gold Rays with Neck Ribbon, by the government of Japan.

Cranston has also translated the work of poet Mizuno Ruriko.
