= Yūkichi Takeda =

Japanese literary scholar

- Born: 武田祐吉; May 5, 1886; Tokyo
- Died: March 29, 1958 (aged 71)
- Occupations: Japanese literary scholar, School teacher
- Known for: Study of Kojiki and Man'yōshū

Notes
- Infobox contains data from Japanese Wikipedia

Yūkichi Takeda (武田 祐吉, Takeda Yūkichi; 5 May 1886 – 29 March 1958) was a scholar of Japanese literature.

== Biography ==
He was born in the Nihonbashi Ward of Tokyo City (modern-day Chūō Ward, Tokyo).

He became a lecturer as Kokugakuin University in 1926. He is known for his research on the Kojiki and the Man'yōshū, and in 1950 was awarded the Japan Academy Prize for his work on the Man'yōshū.
