= Yamanoue no Okura =

Japanese writer

Yamanoue no Okura (山上憶良, also written as 山於億良, 660?–733?) was a Japanese poet, the best known for his poems of children and commoners. He was a member of Japanese missions to Tang China. He was also a contributor to the Man'yōshū and his writing had a strong Chinese influence. Unlike other Japanese poetry of the time, his work emphasizes a morality based on the teachings of Confucius and Buddhism. Most scholars believe that he was born in 660, on the basis of his Chinese prose "Chin'a Jiai-bun" recorded in the fifth volume of Man'yōshū as a work written in 733 (Tenpyō 5), in which he says, "In this year, I am 74."

Yamanoue no Okura accompanied a mission to Tang China in 701 and returned to Japan in 707. In the years following his return he served in various official capacities. He served as the governor of Hōki (near present-day Tottori), tutor to the crown prince, and Governor of Chikuzen. While there, he associated with Otomo no Tabito, who was serving in Dazaifu.

== Origins ==
Based on a reference to the Yamanoue clan in the Shinsen Shōjiroku, he was said to be a descendant of Emperor Kōshō. (Note: Also traditionally taken as an ancestor of Okura's senior poet Kakinomoto no Hitomaro.) A large number of literary scholars led by Susumu Nakanishi have proposed that he was born in the Korean kingdom of Baekje, a view criticized by the historians Kazuo Aoki and Arikiyo Saeki in their respective works.

Edwin Cranston, Professor of Japanese literature at Harvard University, writes:

‘Okura’s early life is obscure, but recent research has led to the conclusion that his origins were Korean, that he was in fact born in Paekche, Japan’s ally on the Korean peninsula, and was brought to Japan in the wave of refugees that came when that state was extinguished by its rival Silla in 663. Okura would have been in his fourth year. His father, a doctor who entered the service of the Japanese court, no doubt provided his son with a thorough Chinese-style education. This education is amply evident in Okura’s surviving work, but his putative foreign origins are not. When he speaks of his adopted country he seems to speak as a native son.’

Okura's potentially continental origins have been cited as an example of the influence continental immigrants had on early Japanese politics, society and culture.

== Bibliography ==
- Nishizawa, Masashi, ed. (2002). Koten Bungaku o Yomu Tame no Yōgo Jiten [Dictionary of Terms for Reading Classical Japanese Literature] (in Japanese). Tokyo: Tōkyō-dō Shuppan. ISBN 978-4490106008.
- Cranston, Edwin A., The Gem-Glistening Cup,, Stanford University Press, 1993.
