= Yamabe no Akahito =

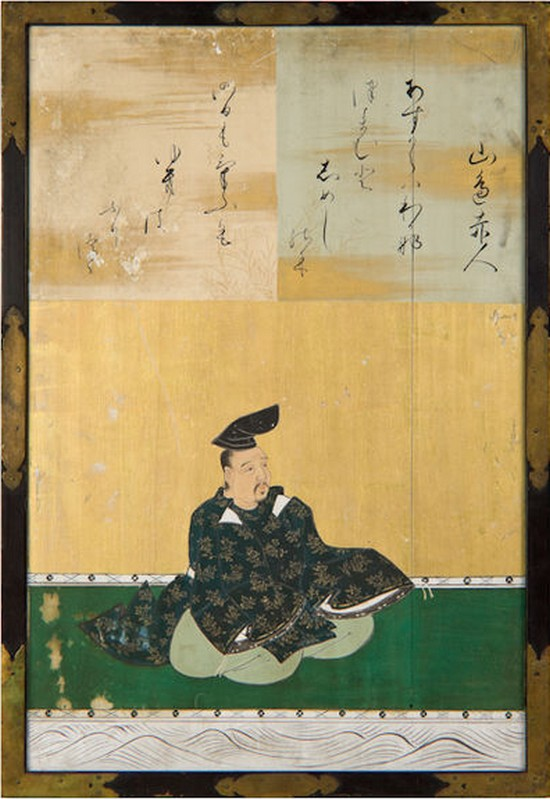
Kanō Tan'yū,Yamabe no Akahito,1642

Yamabe no Akahito (山部 赤人 or 山邊 赤人) (fl. 724–736) was a poet of the Nara period in Japan. The Man'yōshū, an ancient anthology, contains 13 chōka ("long poems") and 37 tanka ("short poems") of his. Many of his poems were composed during journeys with Emperor Shōmu between 724 and 736. Yamabe is regarded as one of the kami of poetry, and is called Waka Nisei along with Kakinomoto no Hitomaro. He is noted as one of the Thirty-six Poetry Immortals.

His contemplation of Mount Fuji across Tago Bay became a popular view depicted by ukiyo-e artists, including Hiroshige and Utagawa Kuniyoshi.

The American composer Alan Hovhaness used a text by Yamabe from the Man'yōshū in his cantata Fuji, Op. 182 (1960, rev. 1964).

== Works ==
Shin Kokin Wakashu (New Collection of Ancient and Modern Japanese Poetry)

・田子の浦に うち出でてみれば 白妙の 富士の高嶺に 雪は降りつつ

Tagonoura ni Uchiide te mire ba Shirotae no Fuji no takane ni Yuki wa furi tsutsu

Explanation

When you go to Tagonoura and look in the distance, you can see pure white Mt. Fuji and snow is piled up. This poem describes the beautiful winter scenery of Mt. Fuji seen from Tagonoura. Later, this poem was selected for Hyakunin Isshu (one hundred waka poems by one hundred poets).

== Historic Sites ==
There is a grave of Yamabe no Akahito at Haibara Yamanobe in Uda City, Nara Prefecture. It is a quiet graveyard with a Gorinto (a gravestone composed of five pieces piled up one upon another), Manyo kahi (a monument engraved in the Manyo style of poetry) and a small signboard. The Gorinto is 210 centimeters high and very simple. It seems to have been built in the Kamakura period, and there is no evidence that Yamabe no Akahito is buried here.

== Cultural Properties ==
At Fujinokuni Tagonoura Minato Park in Fuji City, Shizuoka Prefecture, there is a Man’yo kahi. This monument is engraved with "a poem about Mt. Fuji" written by Akahito Yamabe, and uses Matsuno stone (commonly known as "bale stone") from Minami Matsuno, Fuji City. Mt. Fuji can be seen from this park, and eight stone pillars are arranged in the shape of Mt. Fuji to overlap it. The inscription has a high cultural value because the manuscript Man'yogana is engraved as it is.
