= Ōtomo no Yakamochi =

Japanese writer (718–785)

- 大伴 家持
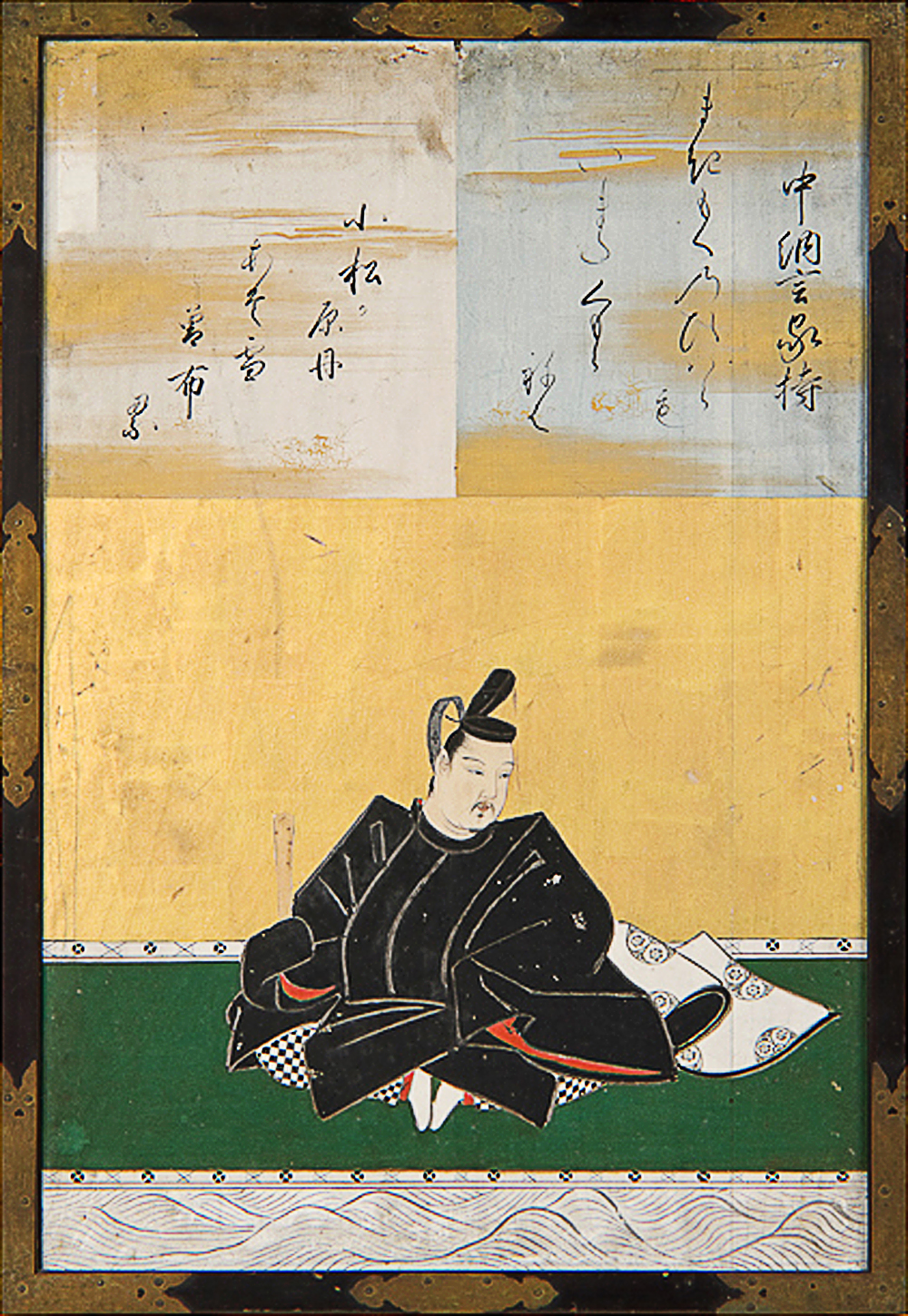
- Chūnagon Yakamochi by Kanō Tan'yū, 1648
- Born: 2 April 718
- Died: 1 May 785 (aged 67); Mutsu Province, Japan
- Occupations: Statesman, warrior, poet
- Writing career
- Notable work: Man'yōshū

Ōtomo no Yakamochi (大伴 家持; Japanese pronunciation: [oː.to.mo no (|) ja.kaꜜ.mo.tɕi], 2 April 718 – 1 May 785) was a Japanese statesman and waka poet in the Nara period. He was one of the Man'yō no Go-taika, the five great poets of his time, and was part of Fujiwara no Kintō's Thirty-six Poetry Immortals (三十六歌仙, sanjūrokkasen).

Yakamochi was a member of the prestigious Ōtomo clan. Like his grandfather and father before him, Yakamochi was a well-known politician, and by Enryaku rose to the position of chūnagon (中納言), his highest bureaucratic position.

== Biography ==
Yakamochi was born into the Ōtomo clan; his grandfather was Ōtomo no Yasumaro and his father was Ōtomo no Tabito. The Ōtomo clan were warriors and bureaucrats in the Yamato Court, and Yakamochi served as a provincial governor (国司, kokushi) in several provinces. He was the nephew of Ōtomo no Sakanoue no Iratsume, who was also poet and a favorite of Prince Hozumi. When Tabito died in 731, Yakamochi became the head of the Ōtomo family.

In 738, he met Udoneri, and in 740 at the behest of Emperor Shōmu went to Dazaifu (Kyūshū) to suppress the rebellion of Fujiwara no Hirotsugu. In 745 he achieved the rank of jōgoika (従五位下, "Junior fifth rank lower") in the Imperial court. In July of the following year, he became governor of Etchū Province, a post he lasted in until 751. By this time he was already the author of 220 waka. In 751, he was promoted to shōnagon (小納言) and returned to the capital.

In 754, he was appointed military commander (兵部少輔, heibu shōsuke), and the following year concerned himself with the garrison (防人, sakimori) at Nanba, a time that is described in the Sakimori Songs Collection in the Man'yōshū. Yakamochi did not take part in the Tachibana no Naramaro rebellion (橘奈良麻呂の変, tachibana no naramaro no ran). Instead, he conspired with Fujiwara no Yoshitsugu, Isonokami Yakatsugu and Saeki no Imaemishi to plot the assassination of Fujiwara no Nakamaro. Afterwards Yoshitsugu took sole responsibility for the affair, but due to suspicions about Yakamochi's involvement he was transferred to the governorship of Satsuma Province.

In 777, he rose to the governorship of Ise Province. According to the records of the Ise Shrine (伊勢神宮, ise jingū), he served in this post for about five years. In 780 he was promoted to councillor (参議, sangi). Fearing suspicion and banishment from the capital for aiding in Hikami no Kawatsugu's rebellion (氷上川継の乱, hikami no kawatsugu no ran), he remained quiet and was promoted to chūnagon (中納言) in 783.

He died in 785 by drowning in Mutsu Province while attending to his concurrent post as shōgun. Soon after his death, Fujiwara no Tanetsugu was assassinated; suspecting that Yakamochi was involved in the affair, his burial was denied and he was posthumously disgraced and excommunicated. His son was stripped of rank and forced into exile, and it was only in 806 that he regained his rank.

== Poetic works ==
A theory holds that Yakamochi was the compiler (or the final compiler) of the Man'yōshū, the first poetry anthology created in Japanese history, for which he not only wrote several poems but also transcribed, rewrote, and refashioned an unknown number of ancient poems and folklore. About 481 of the poems included in the anthology were his works. He was the most prolific and prominent writer of his time, and had a great influence on the Shika Wakashū as well. The famous Gunka song Umi Yukaba used one of his most famous and outstanding poem as lyrics, and was considered Japan's second anthem during wartime. It was the anthem of the Japanese navy, serving as the send-off song for sailors at the beginning of the war in 1937. It also formed part of the Japanese military appropriation of high culture for the historical justification of its existence.

He wrote a eulogy (banka) for Prince Asaka (安積皇子 Asaka-no-miko).

== See also ==
- Japanese poetry
