= Ōtomo no Tabito =

Japanese poet

Ōtomo no Tabito 大伴旅人
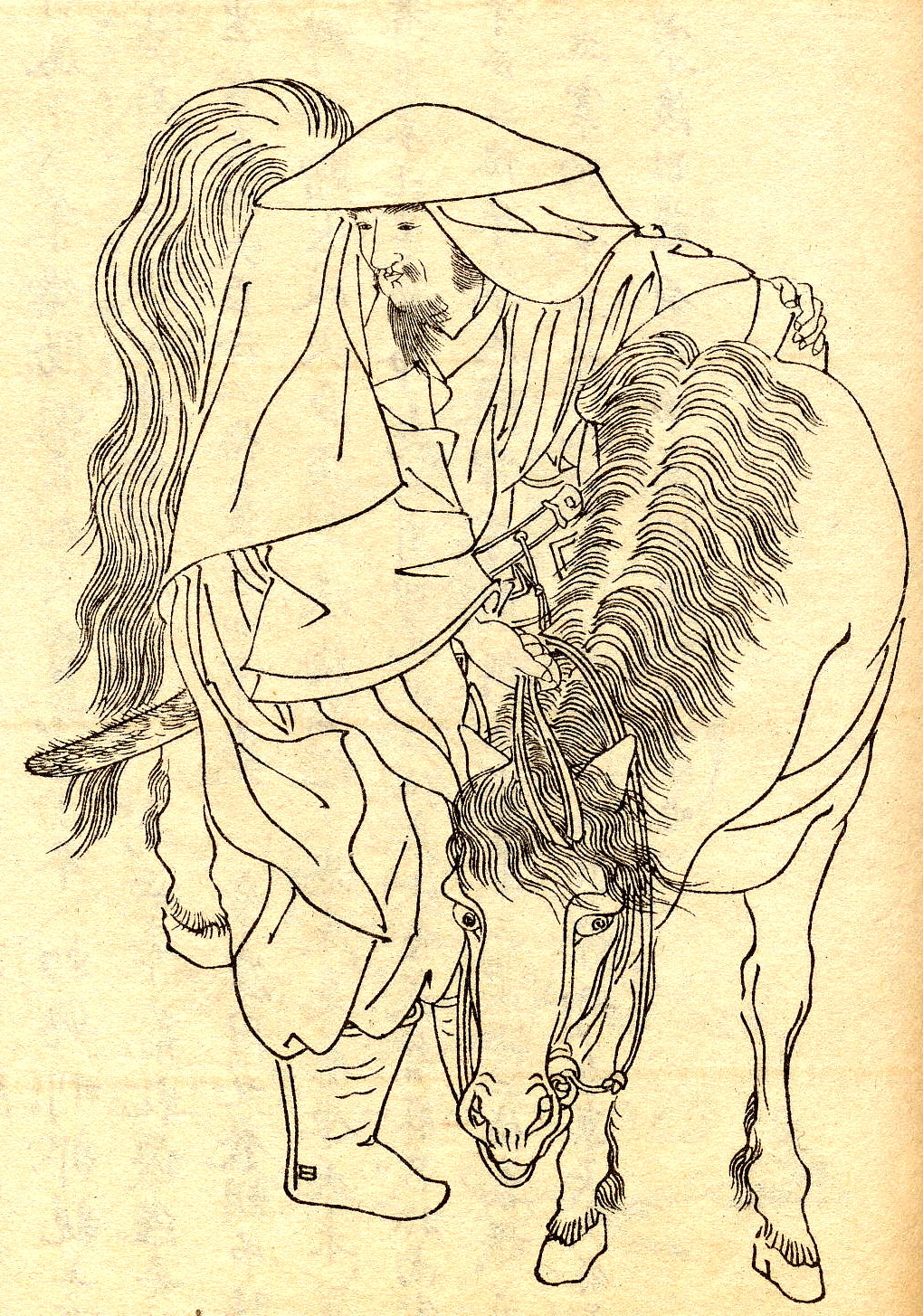
- Ōtomo no Tabito in Zenken Kojitsu by Kikuchi Yōsai
- Born: 665
- Died: 31 August 731
- Occupations: court noble, poet
- Spouse: Ōtomo no Iratsume
- Parents: Ōtomo no Yasumaro (father); Iratsume (mother)

Ōtomo no Tabito (大伴 旅人; 665 - 31 August 731) was a Japanese court noble, military leader and poet. He is known for his military campaign against the Hayato Rebellion and as the father of Ōtomo no Yakamochi, who contributed to the compilation of the Man'yōshū alongside his father. He served as Dainagon and held the court rank of Junior Second Rank.

== Life ==
Ōtomo was born in 665, the son of Dainagon Ōtomo no Yasumaro. His mother was Iratsume, the daughter of Kose no Hito.

During Empress Genmei's New Year's Day celebration of 710, he led the cavalry, Hayato, Emishi, and others as the Shogun of the Left with his deputy, Hozumi no Oyu, in a march along the Suzaku Avenue.

In 711, he was given the court rank of Junior Fourth Rank, Lower Grade, and in 715, he was promoted to Junior Fourth Rank, Upper Grade, Minister of the Center. In 718, he was promoted to Chūnagon, and in 719, he was promoted Senior Fourth Rank, Lower Grade.

In 720, when the Hayato Rebellion erupted in Kyushu after the assassination of Governor of Ōsumi Province Yako no Maro, Ōtomo was ordered to lead Japanese forces to suppress the rebellion. After the death of Minister of the Right Fujiwara no Fuhito, Ōtomo received an imperial edict to return to Nara. However, since the Hayato had not yet been pacified, the deputy shogun and his men were ordered to continue garrisoning the area. As a result, southern Kyushu was firmly brought under the control of the Imperial court under Empress Genmei.

In 721, he was promoted to Junior Third Rank, and in 724, he was promoted to Senior Third Rank upon the accession to the throne of Emperor Shōmu.

Around 728, Ōtomo was transferred to Dazaifu with his wife, Ōtomo no Iratsume, as Governor of Dazaifu, the second time he was sent to Kyushu after his 60th birthday, and this appointment could have been a strategic demotion by the four Fujiwara brothers, Muchimaro, Fusasaki, Umakai and Maro, to oust Prince Nagaya, the Minister of the Left in power at the time. However, it has also been theorized that Ōtomo was transferred because of his excellent skills in diplomacy and defense in light of the international situation at the time. In Dazaifu, he compiled the Chikushi Kadan of the Man'yōshū with Yamanoue no Okura and Sami Mansei. After arriving in Dazaifu, his wife died.

In 730, he was appointed Dainagon.

Tabito was a contemporary of Hitomaro, but lacked his success in the Imperial Court. While serving as Governor-General of Dazaifu, the military procuracy in northern Kyushu from 728-730, Tabito hosted a plum-blossom party, encouraging the composition of poetry among his subordinates in imitation of Chinese style elegance. He also showed his Chinese education in his set of thirteen tanka in praise of sake.
