= Dazaifu (government) =

Regional government in 8th to 12th century Kyushu, Japan

Coordinates: 33°30′52.35″N 130°30′54.52″E

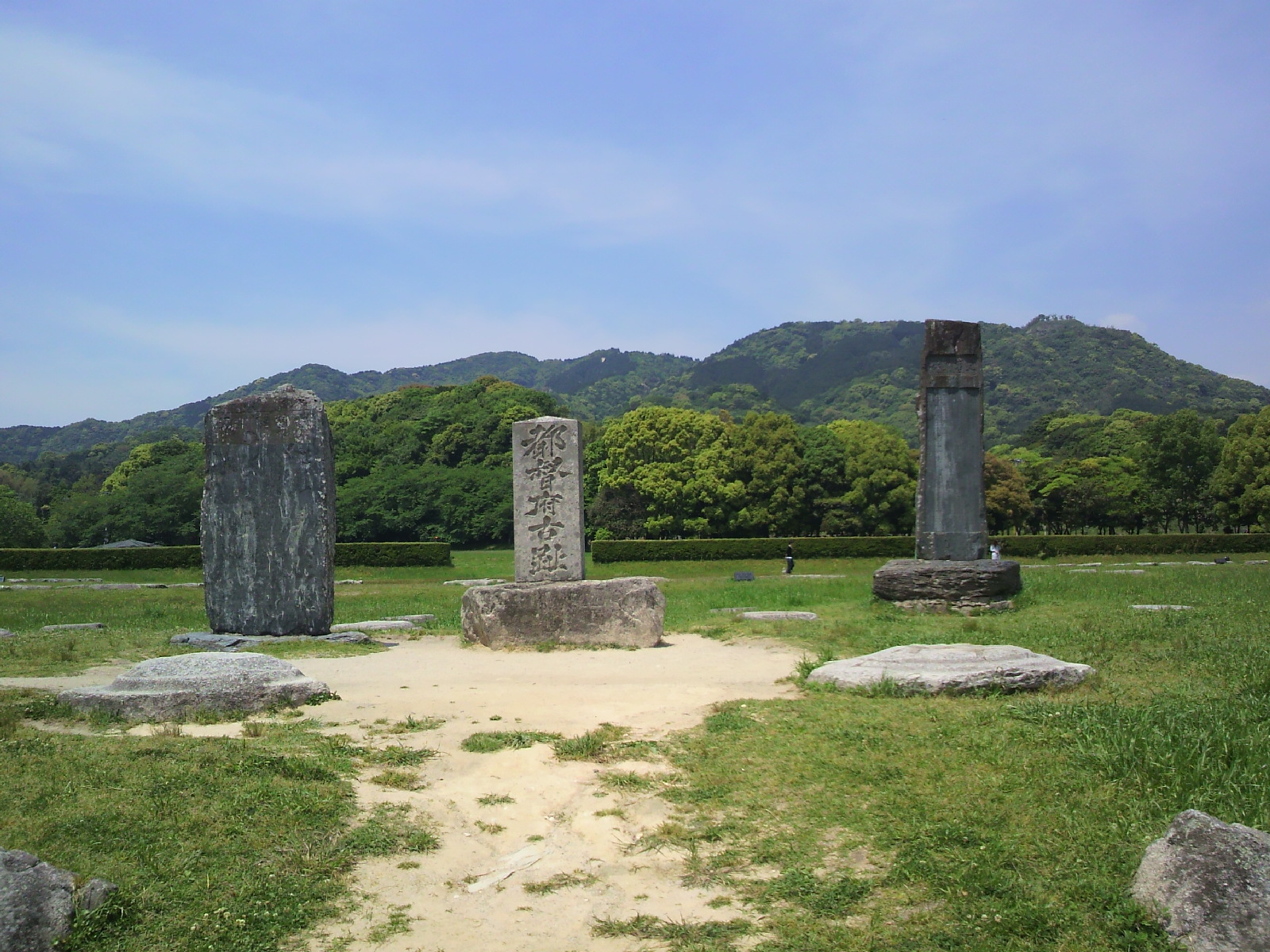
Site of the former Dazaifu headquarters in Dazaifu, Fukuoka

The Dazaifu (大宰府 or 太宰府) is a Japanese term for the regional government in Kyushu from the 8th to the 12th centuries. The name may also refer to the seat of government which grew into the modern city of Dazaifu in Fukuoka Prefecture.

== History ==
The Dazaifu was established in northwest Kyushu the late 7th century. The town of Dazaifu grew up around the civil and military headquarters of the regional government.

During the 8th and 9th centuries, records refer to Dazaifu as "the distant capital".

In 1268, envoys bearing letters from Kublai Khan appeared at the Dazaifu court. There were a series of envoys which came before the unsuccessful invasion of 1274.

In the Muromachi period, the political center of the region was moved to Hakata.

The city of Dazaifu was the center of the Shōni clan and later the Ōuchi clan. In the Edo period, Dazaifu was a part of Kuroda domain until the han system was abolished in 1873.

== Usage ==
The flexible term refers to the regional government for all of Kyūshū and nearby islands.

From the 7th through the 13th century, the governor and vice-governor of Dazaifu had civil and military functions. The titles of the vice governors were Dazai dani and Dazai shoni. Among the Dazai shoni was Fujiwara no Hirotsugu, who started a rebellion in the year 740.

Sometimes there was an official Absentee Governor (Dazai-no-sotsu). This title was given only to Imperial princes. Among those who held this office was Takaharu-shinnō, who later became Emperor Go-Daigo.

=== City ===
Dazaifu is the name of the place where the regional government was centered in the late Nara period through the Muromachi period. It is the town which grew up around the government center in the 7th through the 12th centuries. It is also the name of the small city which continued to grow even after the regional government center was moved.

=== Region ===
Dazaifu refers to the region which includes all the provinces on the island of Kyūshū and other nearby islands.

=== Government ===
The Dazaifu is the name of the former civil government on the island of Kyūshū. As it grew and developed, a large complex of government offices (都府楼跡, Tofuro-ato) was built for the use of the hierarchy of bureaucrats. The many buildings were arranged along a symmetrical grid, not far from the Buddhist temple complex at Kanzeon-ji (観世音寺).

Dazaifu is a metonym of the official position at the head of the regional government. It is also a metonym for the person who fills this leadership role.

== See also ==
- Asteroid 19917 Dazaifu named for the Dazaifu government
- Sugawara no Michizane
