= Man'yōshū =

Oldest extant collection of Japanese poetry

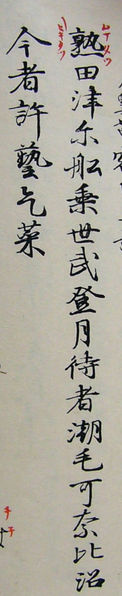
A replica of a Man'yōshū poem No. 8, by Nukata no Ōkimi

The Man'yōshū (万葉集, literally "Collection of Ten Thousand Leaves") (Note: See § Name below) is the oldest extant collection of Japanese waka (poetry in Classical Japanese), (Note: It is not the oldest anthology of poetry written in Japan, since the Kaifūsō, an anthology of Japanese kanshi—poetry in Classical Chinese—predates it by at least several years.) compiled sometime after AD 759 during the Nara period. The anthology is one of the most revered of Japan's poetic compilations. The compiler, or the last in a series of compilers, is today widely believed to be Ōtomo no Yakamochi, although numerous other theories have been proposed. The chronologically last datable poem in the collection is from AD 759 (No. 4516). It contains many poems from a much earlier period, with the bulk of the collection representing the period between AD 600 and 759. The precise significance of the title is not known with certainty.

The Man'yōshū comprises more than 4,500 waka poems in 20 volumes, and is broadly divided into three genres: Zoka, songs at banquets and trips; Somonka, songs about love between men and women; and Banka, songs to mourn the death of people. These songs were written by people of various statuses, such as the Emperor, aristocrats, junior officials, Sakimori soldiers (Sakimori songs), street performers, peasants, and Togoku folk songs (Eastern songs). There are more than 2,100 waka poems by unknown authors.

The collection is divided into 20 parts or books; this number was followed in most later collections. The collection contains 265 chōka (long poems), 4,207 tanka (short poems), one an-renga (short connecting poem), one bussokusekika (a poem in the form 5-7-5-7-7-7; named for the poems inscribed on the Buddha's footprints at Yakushi-ji in Nara), four kanshi (Chinese poems), and 22 Chinese prose passages. Unlike later collections, such as the Kokin Wakashū, there is no preface.

The Man'yōshū is widely regarded as being a particularly unique Japanese work, though its poems and passages did not differ starkly from its contemporaneous (for Yakamochi's time) scholarly standard of Chinese literature and poetics; many entries of the Man'yōshū have a continental tone, earlier poems having Confucian or Taoist themes and later poems reflecting on Buddhist teachings. However, the Man'yōshū is considered singular, even in comparison with later works, in choosing primarily Ancient Japanese themes, extolling Shintō virtues of forthrightness (真, makoto) and virility (益荒男振り, masuraoburi). In addition, the language of many entries of the Man'yōshū exerts a powerful sentimental appeal to readers:

[T]his early collection has something of the freshness of dawn [...] There are irregularities not tolerated later, such as hypometric lines; there are evocative place names and makurakotoba; and there are evocative exclamations such as kamo, whose appeal is genuine even if incommunicable. In other words, the collection contains the appeal of an art at its pristine source with a romantic sense of venerable age and therefore of an ideal order since lost.

The compilation of the Man'yōshū also preserves the names of earlier Japanese poetic compilations, these being the Ruijū Karin (類聚歌林, Forest of Classified Verses), several texts called the Kokashū (古歌集, Collections of Antique Poems), as well as at least four family or individual anthologies known as kashū (家集) belonging to Kakimoto no Hitomaro, Kasa no Kanamura, Takahashi no Mushimaro and Tanabe no Sakimaro.

== Name ==
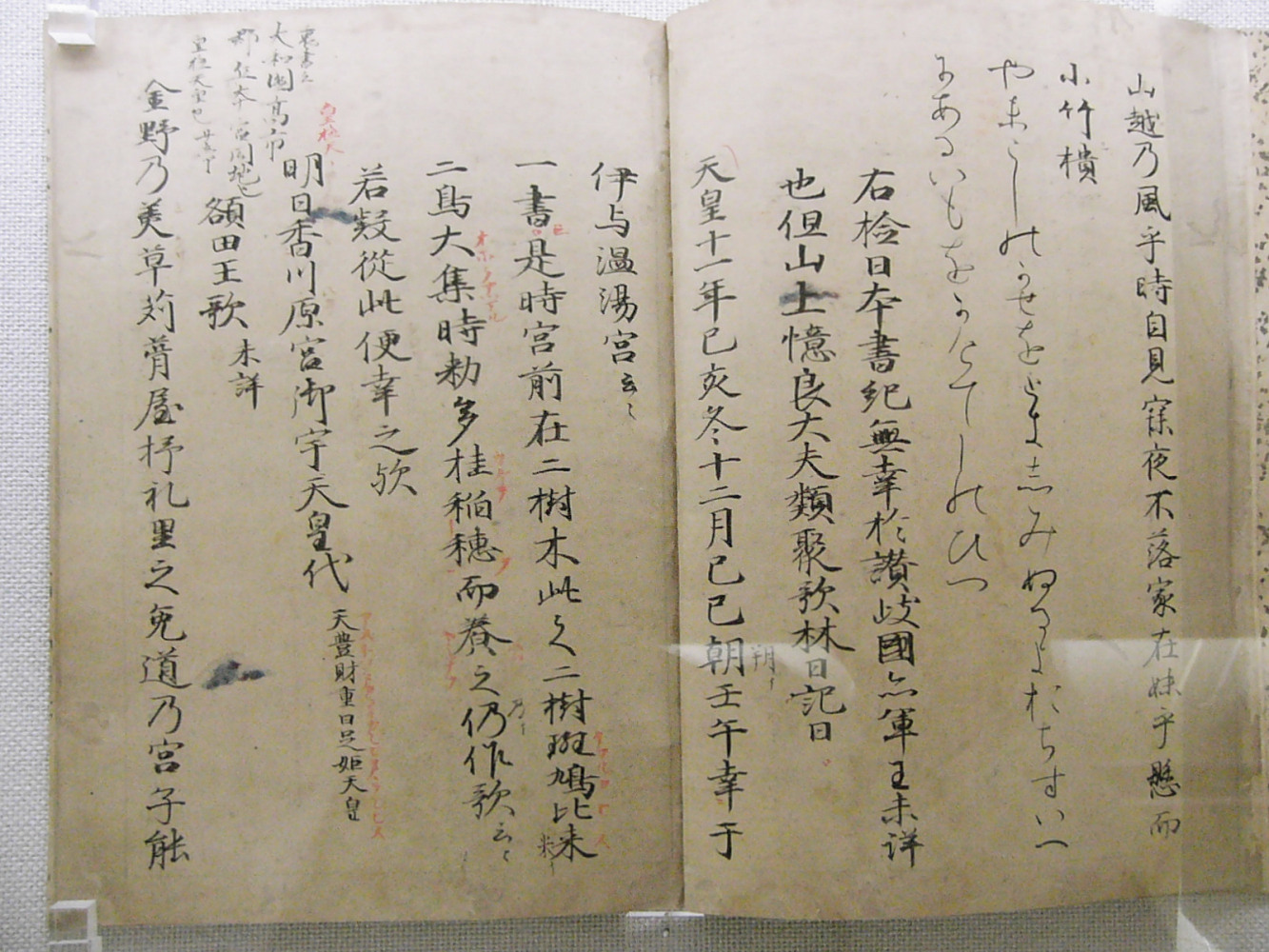
A page from the Man'yōshū

The literal translation of the kanji that make up the title Man'yōshū (万 — 葉 — 集) is "ten thousand — leaves — collection".

The principal interpretations of this name, according to the 20th century scholar Sen'ichi Hisamatsu, are:

1. A book that collects a great many poems;
2. A book for all generations; and:
3. A poetry collection that uses a large volume of paper.

Of these, supporters of the first interpretation can be further divided into:

1. Those who interpret the middle character as "words" "言の葉" (koto no ha, lit. "leaves of speech"), thus giving "ten thousand words", i.e. "many waka", including Sengaku, Shimokōbe Chōryū, Kada no Azumamaro and Kamo no Mabuchi, and;
2. Those who interpret the middle character as literally referring to leaves of a tree, but as a metaphor for poems, including Ueda Akinari, Kimura Masakoto, Masayuki Okada, Torao Suzuki, Kiyotaka Hoshikawa and Susumu Nakanishi.

Furthermore, supporters of the second interpretation of the name can be divided into:

1. It was meant to express the intention that the work should last for all time (proposed by Keichū, (Note: Keichū also recognized the first interpretation as a possibility.) and supported by Kamochi Masazumi, Inoue Michiyasu, Yoshio Yamada, Noriyuki Kojima and Tadashi Ōkubo);
2. It was meant to wish for long life for the emperor and empress (Shinobu Origuchi);
3. It was meant to indicate that the collection included poems from all ages (proposed by Yamada).

The third interpretation of the name - that it refers to a poetry collection that uses a large quantity of paper - was proposed by Yūkichi Takeda in his Man'yōshū Shinkai jō (萬葉集新解上), but Takeda also accepted the second interpretation; his theory that the title refers to the large volume of paper used in the collection has not gained much traction among other scholars.

== Periodization ==
The collection is customarily divided into four periods. The earliest dates to prehistoric or legendary pasts, from the time of Emperor Yūryaku (r. c. 456 – c. 479) to those of the little-documented Emperor Yōmei (r. 585–587), Saimei (r. 642-645, 655-661), and finally Tenji (r. 668–671) during the Taika Reforms and the time of Fujiwara no Kamatari (614–669). The second period covers the end of the 7th century, coinciding with the popularity of Kakinomoto no Hitomaro, one of Japan's greatest poets. The third period spans 700 – c. 730 and covers the works of such poets as Yamabe no Akahito, Ōtomo no Tabito and Yamanoue no Okura. The fourth period spans 730–760 and includes the work of the last great poet of this collection, the compiler Ōtomo no Yakamochi himself, who not only wrote many original poems but also edited, updated and refashioned an unknown number of ancient poems.

== Poets ==
The vast majority of the poems of the Man'yōshū were composed over a period of roughly a century, (Note: A small number of poems are attributed to figures from the ancient past, such as Emperor Yūryaku.) with scholars assigning the major poets of the collection to one or another of the four "periods" discussed above. Princess Nukata's poetry is included in that of the first period (645–672), while the second period (673–701) is represented by the poetry of Kakinomoto no Hitomaro, generally regarded as the greatest of Man'yōshū poets and one of the most important poets in Japanese history. The third period (702–729) includes the poems of Takechi no Kurohito, whom Donald Keene called "[t]he only new poet of importance" of the early part of this period, when Fujiwara no Fuhito promoted the composition of kanshi (poetry in classical Chinese). Other "third period" poets include: Yamabe no Akahito, a poet who was once paired with Hitomaro but whose reputation has suffered in modern times; Takahashi no Mushimaro, one of the last great chōka poets, who recorded a number of Japanese legends such as that of Ura no Shimako; and Kasa no Kanamura, a high-ranking courtier who also composed chōka but not as well as Hitomaro or Mushimaro. But the most prominent and important poets of the third period were Ōtomo no Tabito, Yakamochi's father and the head of a poetic circle in the Dazaifu, and Tabito's friend Yamanoue no Okura, possibly an immigrant from the Korean kingdom of Paekche, whose poetry is highly idiosyncratic in both its language and subject matter and has been highly praised in modern times. Yakamochi himself was a poet of the fourth period (730–759), and according to Keene he "dominated" this period. He composed the last dated poem of the anthology in 759.

== Linguistic significance ==
In addition to its artistic merits, the Man'yōshū is significant for using the earliest Japanese writing system, the cumbersome man'yōgana. Though it was by no means the first use of this writing system—which was used to compose the Kojiki (712),—it was influential enough to give the writing system its modern name, as man'yōgana means "the kana of the Man'yō[shū]". This system uses Chinese characters in a variety of functions: logographically to represent Japanese words, phonetically to represent Japanese sounds, and frequently in a combination of these. Such usage of Chinese characters to phonetically represent Japanese syllables eventually led to the birth of kana, as they were created from simplified cursive forms (hiragana) and fragments (katakana) of man'yōgana.

Like the majority of surviving Old Japanese literature, the vast majority of the Man'yōshū is written in Western Old Japanese, the dialect of the capital region around Kyoto and Nara. However, specific parts of the collection, particularly volumes 14 and 20, are also highly valued by historical linguists for the information they provide on other Old Japanese dialects, as these volumes collectively contain over 300 poems from the Azuma provinces of eastern Japan—what is now the regions of Chūbu, Kanto, and southern Tōhoku.

== Translations ==
Julius Klaproth produced some early, severely flawed translations of Man'yōshū poetry. Donald Keene explained in a preface to the Nihon Gakujutsu Shinkō Kai edition of the Man'yōshū:

One "envoy" (hanka) to a long poem was translated as early as 1834 by the celebrated German orientalist Heinrich Julius Klaproth (1783–1835). Klaproth, having journeyed to Siberia in pursuit of strange languages, encountered some Japanese castaways, fishermen, hardly ideal mentors for the study of 8th century poetry. Not surprisingly, his translation was anything but accurate.

In 1940, Columbia University Press published a translation created by a committee of Japanese scholars and revised by the English poet, Ralph Hodgson. This translation was accepted in the Japanese Translation Series of the United Nations Educational, Scientific and Cultural Organization (UNESCO).

Dutch scholar Jan L. Pierson completed an English translation of the Man'yōshū between 1929 and 1963, although this is described by Alexander Vovin as "seriously outdated" due to Pierson having "ignored or misunderstood many facts of Old Japanese grammar and phonology" which had been established in the 20th century. Japanese scholars Honda Heihachiro (1967) and Suga Teruo (1991) both produced complete literary translations into English, with the former using rhymed iambic feet and preserving the 31-syllable count of tanka and the latter preserving the 5-7 pattern of syllables in each line. Ian Hideo Levy published the first of what was intended to be a four volume English translation in 1981 for which he received the Japan–U.S. Friendship Commission Prize for the Translation of Japanese Literature.

In 2009, Alexander Vovin published the first volume of his English translation of the Man'yōshū, including commentaries, the original text, and translations of the prose elements in-between poems. He completed, in order, volumes 15, 5, 14, 20, 17, 18, 1, 19, 2, and 16 before his death in 2022, with volume 10 set to be released posthumously.

== Mokkan ==
In premodern Japan, officials used wooden slips or tablets of various sizes, known as mokkan, for recording memoranda, simple correspondence, and official dispatches. Three mokkan that have been excavated contain text from the Man'yōshū. A mokkan excavated in Kizugawa, Kyoto, contains the first 11 characters of poem 2205 from volume 10, written in Man'yōgana. It is dated between 750 and 780, and its size is 23.4 by 2.4 by 1.2 cm (9.21 by 0.94 by 0.47 in). Inspection with an infrared camera revealed other characters, suggesting that the mokkan was used for writing practice. Another mokkan, excavated in 1997 from the Miyamachi archaeological site in Kōka, Shiga, contains poem 3807 in volume 16. It is dated to the middle of the 8th century, and is 2 centimetres (0.79 in) wide by 1 millimetre (0.039 in) thick. Lastly, a mokkan excavated at the Ishigami archaeological site in Asuka, Nara, contains the first 14 characters of poem 1391, in volume 7, written in Man'yōgana. Its size is 9.1 by 5.5 by 0.6 cm (3.58 by 2.17 by 0.24 in), and it is dated to the late 7th century, making it the oldest of the three.

== Plant species cited ==
More than 150 species of grasses and trees are mentioned in approximately 1,500 entries of the Man'yōshū. A Man'yō shokubutsu-en (万葉植物園) is a botanical garden that attempts to contain every species and variety of plant mentioned in the anthology. There are dozens of these gardens around Japan. The first Man'yō shokubutsu-en opened in Kasuga Shrine in 1932.

== See also ==
- Kotodama
- Reiwa
- Umi Yukaba
