= Japanese missions to Tang China =

Series of Japanese expeditions to Tang China

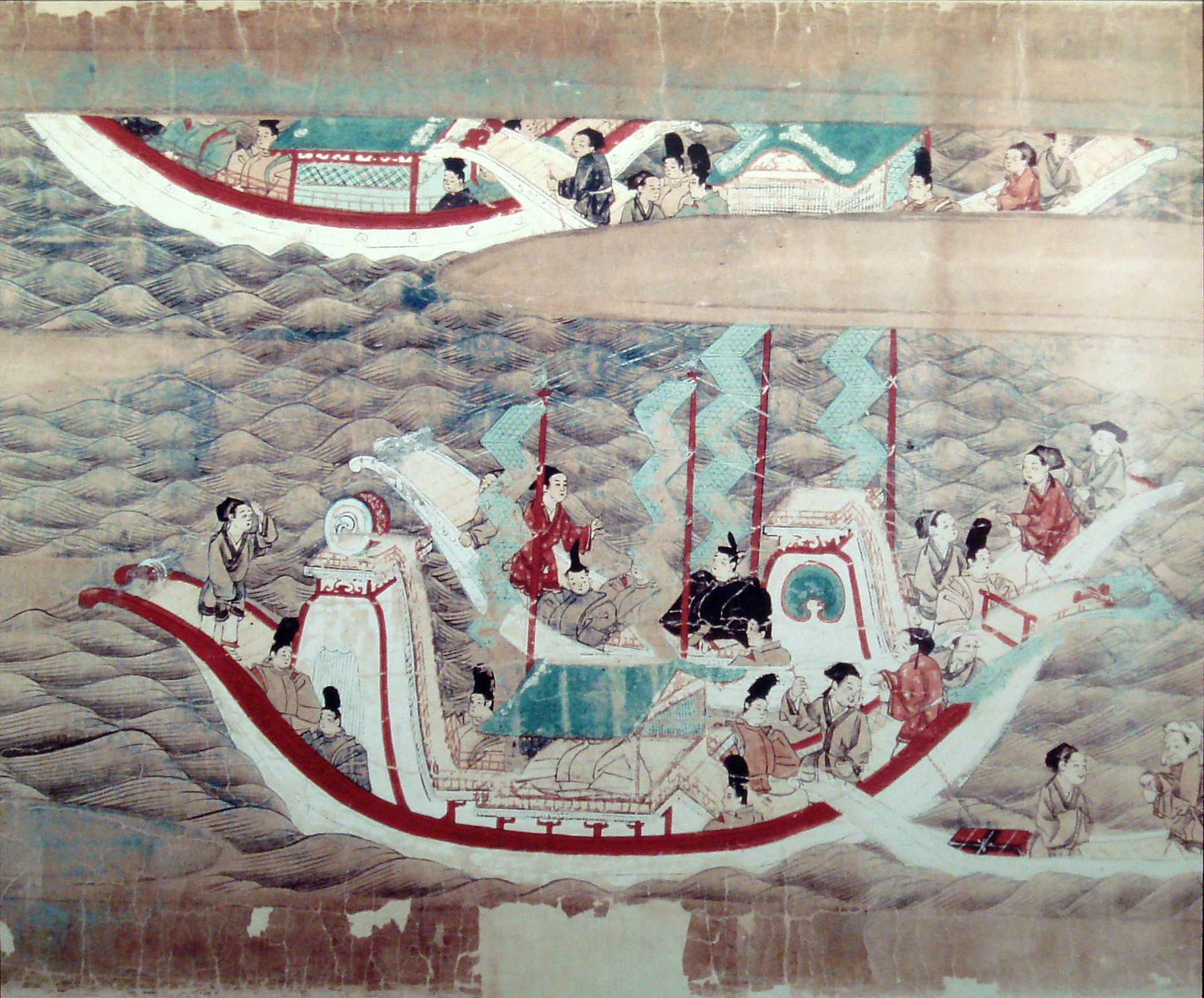
The Japanese embassy to the Tang court as depicted in the Tōseiden Emaki, 1298

The kentōshi route, the sea route from Japan to China

The Japanese missions to Tang China (遣唐使, kentōshi; qiǎntángshǐ) were Japanese efforts to learn Chinese culture and civilization from Tang China, in the 7th, 8th and 9th centuries. The nature of those contacts evolved gradually from political and ceremonial change into cultural exchanges, and the process accompanied growing commercial ties which developed over time.

From 607 to 839, Japan sent 19 missions to Sui and Tang Empires of China (a mission planned for 894 was cancelled). For each expedition, knowledge and learning were the principal objectives. Priests from Japan studied Chinese Buddhism, officials from Japan studied Chinese government, doctors from Japan studied Chinese medicine, and painters from Japan studied Chinese painting. Approximately one third of those who embarked from Japan did not survive to return home.

== List ==
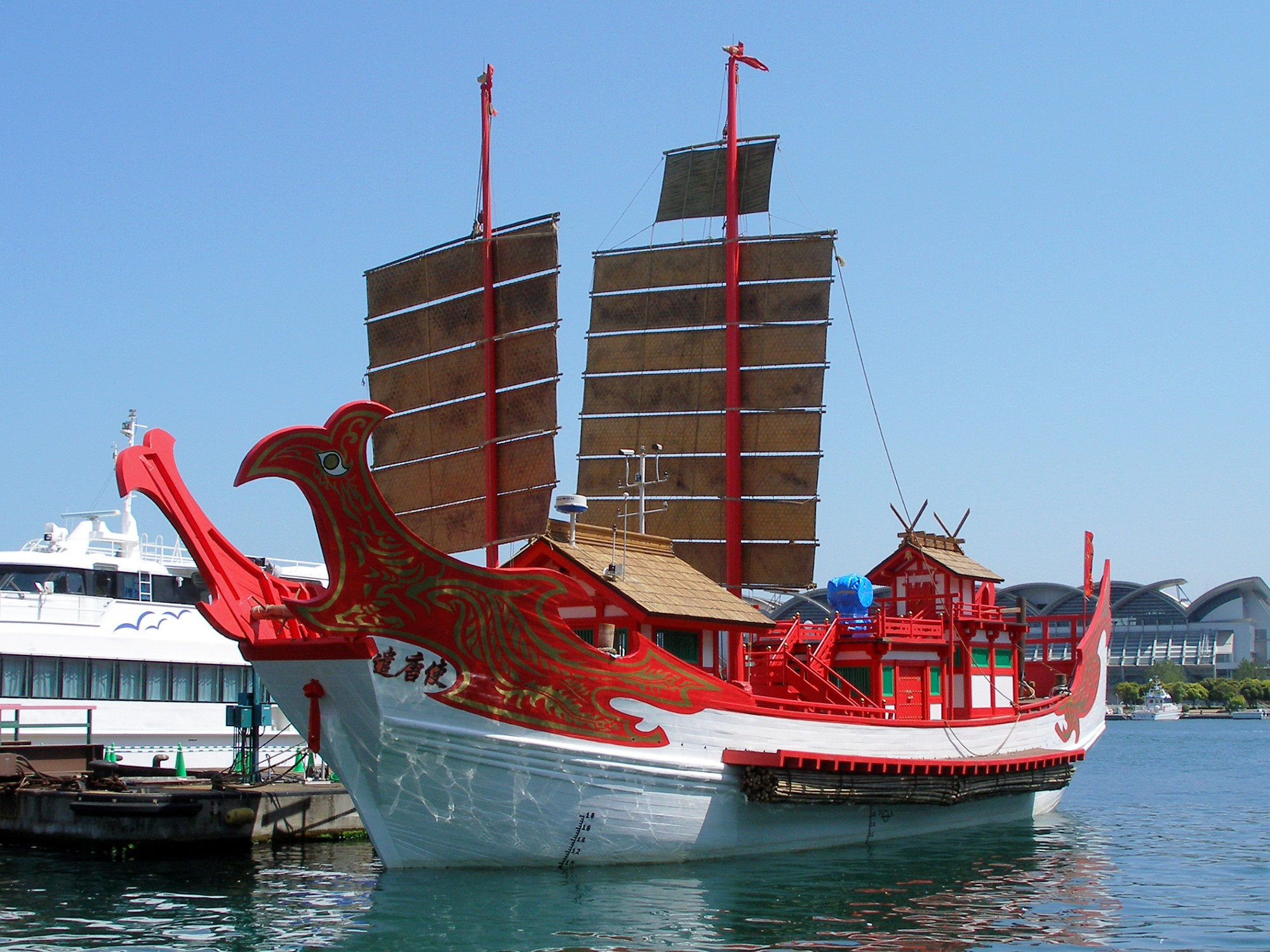
A mission ship reconstructed for Shanghai Expo 2010 (Hakata Bay, May 14, 2010)

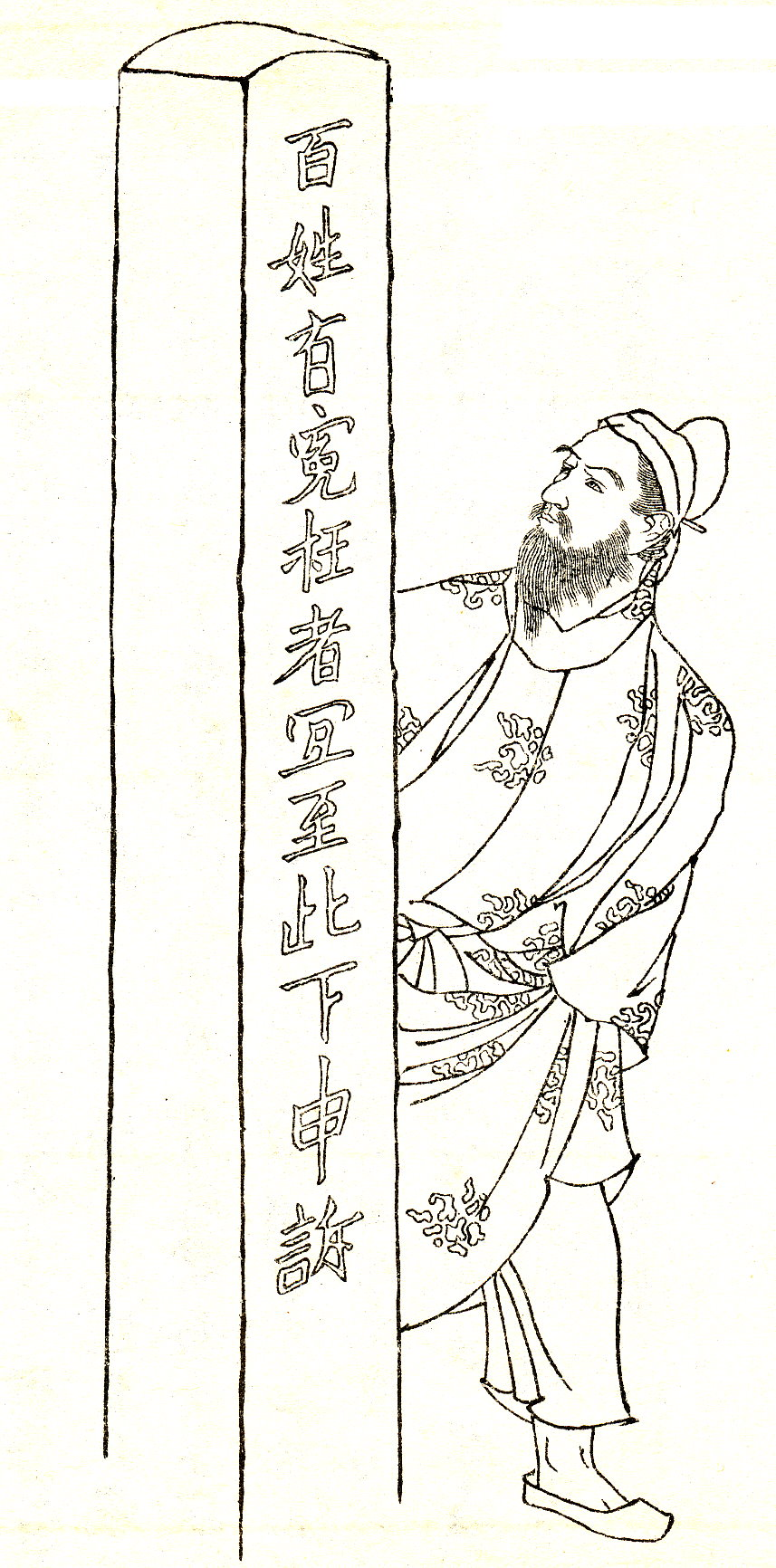
Kibi Makibi (695–775) in a book illustration by Kikuchi Yōsai.

Year (Anno Domini)	Sender	Japanese envoys	Chinese monarch	Comments
630–632	Jomei	Inugami no Mitasuki (犬上御田鍬); Kusushi Enichi (藥師惠日)	Taizong	Accompanied on return by Tang emissary Gao Biaoren (高表仁)
653–654	Kōtoku	Kishi no Nagani (吉士長丹); Kishi no Koma (吉士駒); Takada no Nemaro (高田根麻呂); Kanimori no Omaro (掃守小麻呂)	Gaozong	Vessel carrying Takada no Nemaro foundered on outward journey near the island of Takeshima in Satsuma Province
654–655	Kōtoku	Takamuko no Kuromaro; Kawabe no Maro (河邊); Kusushi Enichi	Gaozong	Takamuko died in China
659–661	Saimei	Sakaibe no Iwashiki (坂合部石布); Tsumori no Kisa (津守吉祥); Iki no Hakatoko (伊吉博德)	Gaozong	Sakaibe died during the trip
665–667	Tenji	Mori no Ōishi (守大石); Sakaibe no Iwatsumi (坂合部岩積)	Gaozong	May have transported Tang emissary Liu Degao (劉德高) to army stationed at old Paekche garrison
667–668	Tenji	Iki no Hakatoko; Kasa no Moroishi (笠諸石)	Gaozong	Transported Tang emissary Sima Facong (司馬法聰) to army stationed at old Paekche garrison
669–670	Tenji	Kawachi no Kujira (河内鯨)	Gaozong	Celebrated subjugation of Koguryŏ
702–704	Mommu	Awata no Mahito (粟田真人); Takahashi no Kasama (高橋笠間); Sakaibe no Ōkita (坂合部大分); Yamanoue no Okura (山上憶良); Kose no Ōji (巨勢祖父)	Wu Zetian	Kose no Ōji returned home in 707; Awata no Mahito returned in 718
717-718	Genshō	Tajihi no Agatamori (多治比縣守); Abe no Yasumaro (阿倍安麻呂); Ōtomo no Yamamori (大伴山守); Fujiwara no Umakai (藤原馬養)	Xuanzong	Awata no Mahito returned in 718; students Abe no Nakamaro and Kibi no Makibi as well as monk Genbō (玄昉) joined this embassy
733–734	Shōmu	Tajihi no Hironari (多治比廣成); Nakatomi no Nashiro (中臣名代)	Xuanzong	4 ships set out on this voyage, and one ship returned in 734; another ship returned in 736; Magistrate Heguri no Hironari (平群廣成) returned in 739
746	Shōmu	Isonokami no Otomaro (石上乙麻呂)	Xuanzong	Cancelled
750–753	Kōken	Fujiwara no Kiyokawa (藤原清河); Ōtomo no Komaro (大伴古麻呂); Kibi no Makibi (吉備真備)	Xuanzong	Ship carrying Fujiwara no Kiyokawa and Abe no Nakamaro shipwrecked in Annam; both became Tang officials and never returned home
761	Junnin	Kō Gendo (高元度)	Suzong	With aim of retrieving Kiyokawa, traveled with Balhae ambassador returning home via Balhae; returned home with send-off by Tang emissary Shen Weiyue (沈惟岳)
761	Junnin	Naka no Iwatomo (仲石伴); Isonokami no Yakatsugu (石上宅嗣); Fujiwara no Tamaro (藤原田麻呂)	Suzong	Cancelled due to damage to vessels
762	Junnin	Nakatomi no Takanushi (中臣鷹主); Koma no Hiroyama (高麗廣山)	Daizong	Cancelled due to lack of favorable wind
777-778	Kōnin	Saeki no Imaemishi (佐伯今毛人); Ōtomo no Masutate (大伴益立); Fujiwara no Takatori (藤原鷹取); Ono no Iwane (小野石根); Ōmiwa no Suetari (大神末足)	Daizong	All four vessels shipwrecked en route home; Ono no Iwane and Tang emissary Zhao Baoying (趙寶英) died
779–781	Kōnin	Fuse no Kiyonao (布勢清直)	Dezong	Tang emissary Sun Xingjin 孫興進 et al. sent off at Mingzhou
804–805	Kammu	Fujiwara no Kadonomaro (藤原葛野麻呂); Ishikawa no Michimasu (石川道益)	Dezong	4 ships on this mission; vessel 3 shipwrecked at Hirado on the outward journey; news of vessel 4 unknown; Kūkai and Saichō joined this embassy
838–839	Ninmyō	Fujiwara no Tsunetsugu (藤原常嗣); Ono no Takamura (小野篂)	Wenzong	Vessel 3 shipwrecked soon after departure at Tsukushi; its 140 passengers did not reach China; the monks Ennin and Ensai on board; passengers on vessels 1 and 4 hired Silla vessels and split up for the voyage home; returning in 839 with a letter from Chinese emperor; vessel 2 returned home in 840
894	Uda	Sugawara no Michizane (菅原道真); Ki no Haseo (紀長谷雄)	Zhaozong	Cancelled

== See also ==
- Tributary system of China
- Sinocentrism
- Japanese missions to Sui China
- Japanese missions to Ming China
- Japanese missions to Silla
- Japanese missions to Joseon
