= Tenpyō =

Period of Japanese history (729–749)

Tenpyō (天平) was a Japanese era name (年号, nengō; "year name") after Jinki and before Tenpyō-kanpō. This period spanned the years from August 729 through April 749. The reigning emperor was Shōmu-tennō (聖武天皇).

== Change of era ==
- 729 Tenpyō gannen (天平元年): The new era name was created to mark an event or series of events. The previous era ended and the new one commenced in Jinki 6, on the 5th day of the 8th month of 729.

== Events of the Tenpyō era ==
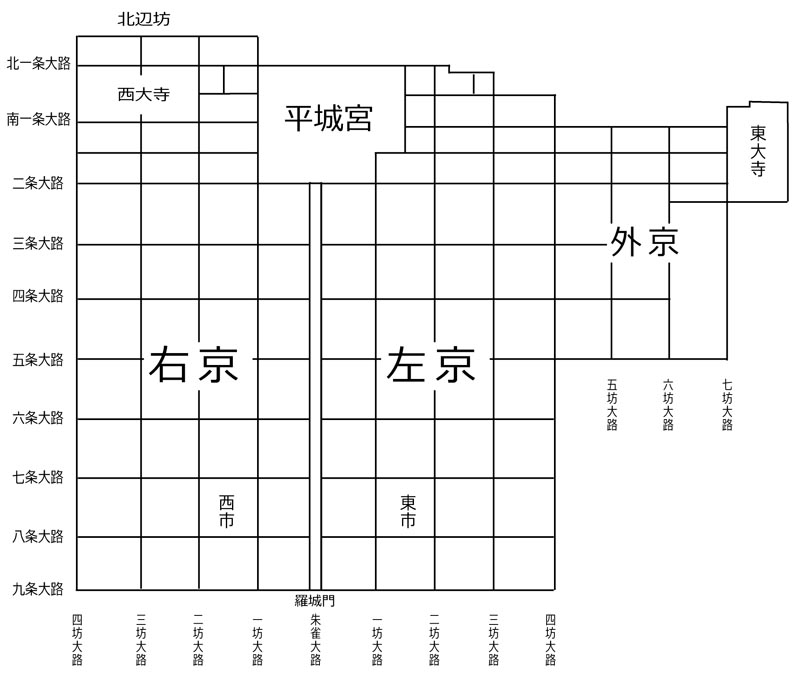
Ground-plan of Heijō-kyō (Nara)

- 740 (Tenpyō 12, 8th month): In the court of Emperor Shōmu in Nara, Kibi no Makibi and Genbō conspire to discredit Fujiwara no Hirotsugu, who is Dazai shoni in Kyushu.
- 740 (Tenpyō 12, 9th month): Hirotsugu revolts in reaction to the growing influence of Genbō and others.
- 740 (Tenpyō 12, 9th month): Under the command of Ōno no Azumabito, an army of 17,000 is sent to Kyushu to stop the potential disturbance.
- 740 (Tenpyō 12, 10th month): Hirotsugu is decisively beaten in battle; and he is beheaded in Hizen Province.
- 740 (Tenpyō 12): The capital is moved to Kuni-kyō.
- 741 (Tenpyō 13): The Emperor calls for nationwide establishment of provincial temples. Provincial temples ("kokubunji") and provincial nunneries ("kokubunniji") were established throughout the country. The more formal name for these "kokubunji" was "konkomyo-shitenno-gokoku no tera" (meaning "temples for the protection of the country by the four guardian deities of the golden light"). The more formal name for these "bokubunniji" was "hokke-metuzai no tera" (meaning "nunneries for eliminating sin by means of the Lotus Sutra").
- 743 (Tenpyō 15): The Emperor issues a rescript to build the Daibutsu (Great Buddha), later to be completed and placed in Tōdai-ji, Nara.
- 743 (Tenpyō 15): The law of Perpetual Ownership of Cultivated Lands (墾田永代私財法) issued
- 744 (Tenpyō 16): Naniwa-kyō announced as capital.
- 745 (Tenpyō 17): The capital returns to Heijō-kyō (Nara), construction of the Great Buddha resumes.
- 749 (Tenpyō 20): After a 25-year reign, Emperor Shōmu abdicates in favor of his daughter, Takano-hime, who will become Empress Kōken. After his abdication, Shomu took the tonsure, thus becoming the first retired emperor to become a Buddhist priest. Empress Kōmyō, following her husband's example, also took holy vows in becoming a Buddhist nun.

== Notes ==
Preceded by Jinki	Era or nengō Tenpyō; 729–749	Succeeded by Tenpyō-kanpō
