= Kagami Shrine =

Shinto shrine in Saga prefecture, Japan

Kagami-jinja 鏡神社
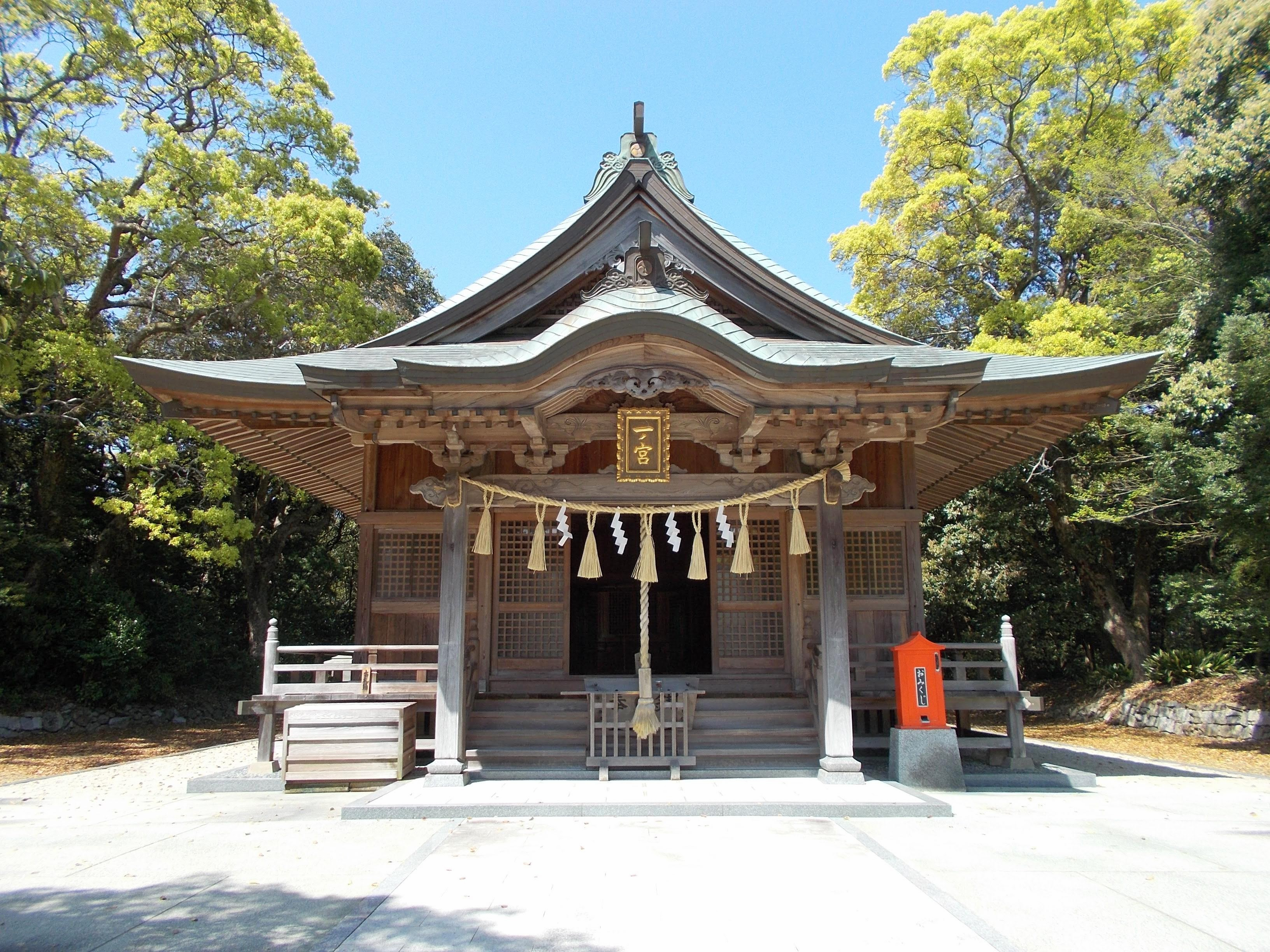
- The Ichi-no-miya main hall of Kagami-jinja

- Location within Japan

Religion
- Affiliation: Shinto
- Deity: Empress Jingū; Fujiwara no Hirotsugu

Location
- Location: 1827, Kagami, Karatsu; Saga 847-0022
- Interactive map of Kagami-jinja 鏡神社
- Coordinates: 33°25′56″N 130°00′31″E

Architecture
- Established: Unknown

Website
- kagami.or.jp

Kagami-jinja (鏡神社) is a Shinto shrine located in Karatsu, Saga prefecture, Japan. The shrine is at the base of Mount Kagami (280 metres (920 ft)) in Genkai Quasi-National Park. It is now called Matsura Sōchinshu Kagami-jinja (松浦総鎮守鏡神社), and formerly known as the name of Kagami no mikoto Byōgū (鏡尊廟宮), Kagami-gū (鏡宮), Matsuura-gū (松浦宮), Itabitsu-sha (板櫃社) and Kuri Daimyōjin (久里大明神).

Kagami-jinja was the head shrine of Matsura County in the former Hizen Province and is classified historically as a "Sosha".

The shrine has a small museum preserving remaining artifacts, including an image of Yōryū Kannon from Goryeo Dynasty of Korea in 1310, now kept at the Saga Prefectural Museum, is the Cultural Properties of Japan.

== History ==
According to legend, Empress Jingū climbed atop of the Mount Kagami during the legendary military invasion of Korea in the 3rd century. She put a mirror aside the mountain tops and praying for victory. After that this mirror gave off a ghost light, she was enshrined her own spirit when she heard to hear that tells a story. After she returned to Japan, she suffered the pain of labor in the land. The villagers gave a freshwater spring to her. She recovered her illness, and it was said that she had given birth to the Emperor Ōjin in Umi now part of modern Fukuoka Prefecture.

The Ni-no-miya, or secondary shrine, is dedicated to Fujiwara no Hirotsugu, the imperial prince and the eldest son of Fujiwara no Umakai. Hirotsugu petitioned for the removal of Genbō; and then Kibi no Makibi and Genbō used this complaint as a pretext to discredit Hirotsugu. As a result, Hirotsugu initiates a futile military campaign in September 740. The shrine was built in 750 by Kibi who was exiled to Dazaifu on the island of Kyushu, ten years after the execution of Hirotsugu. At the time of Genbō's death, it was popularly believed that he was killed by the vengeful spirit of Hirotsugu.

It was originally called Matsuura-gū or Matsuura-byōgū (松浦廟宮), but Kūkai has changed its name to Kagami-jinja.

In the Tamakazura (玉鬘) chapter of The Tale of Genji, the song of the mirror god of Matsuura (松浦なる鏡の神 Matsuura naru Kagami no Kami) written by Tayunogen (大夫監), a powerful family in Higo Province.

== Gallery ==
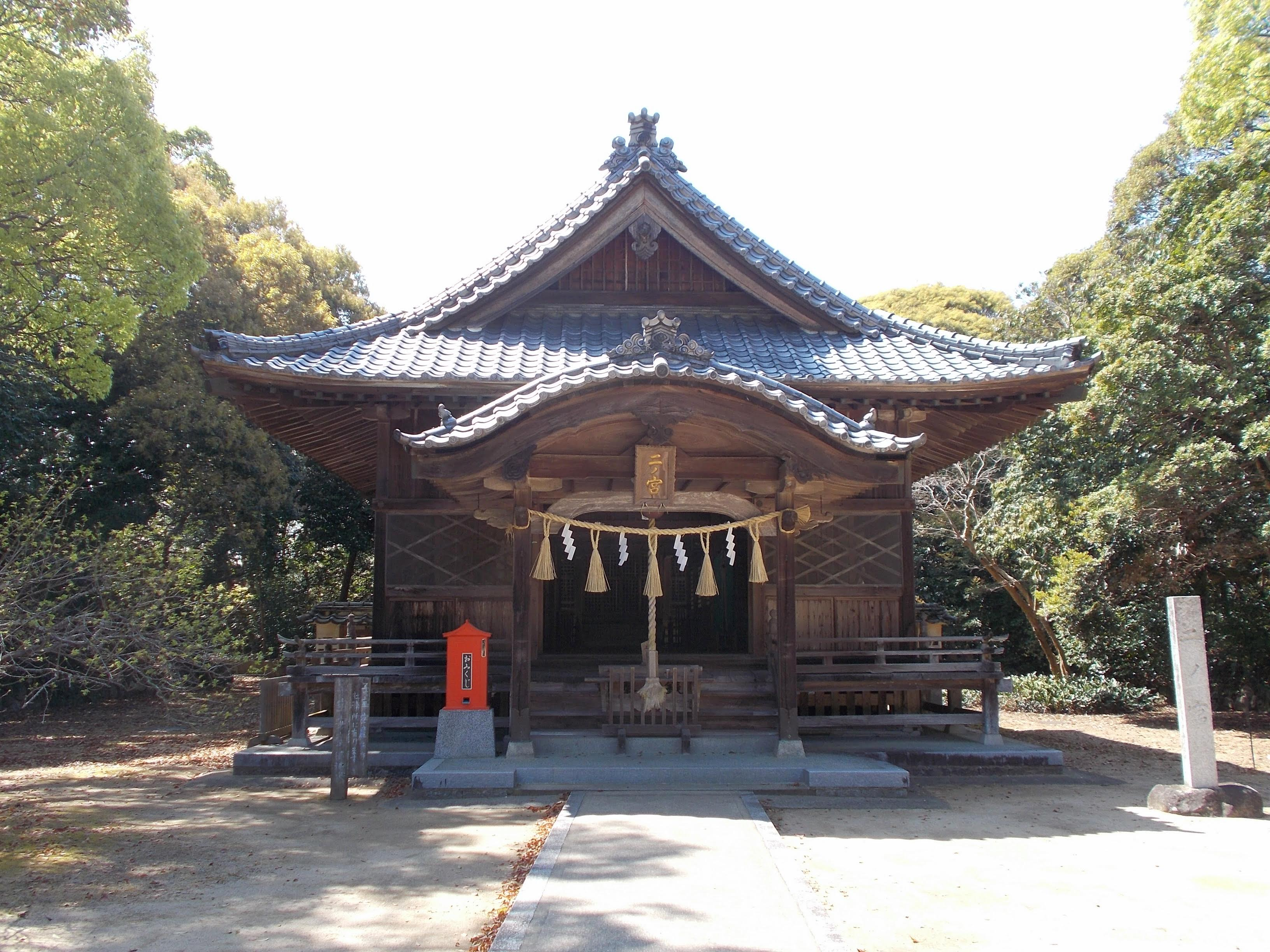
Second main hall of Kagami Jinja.

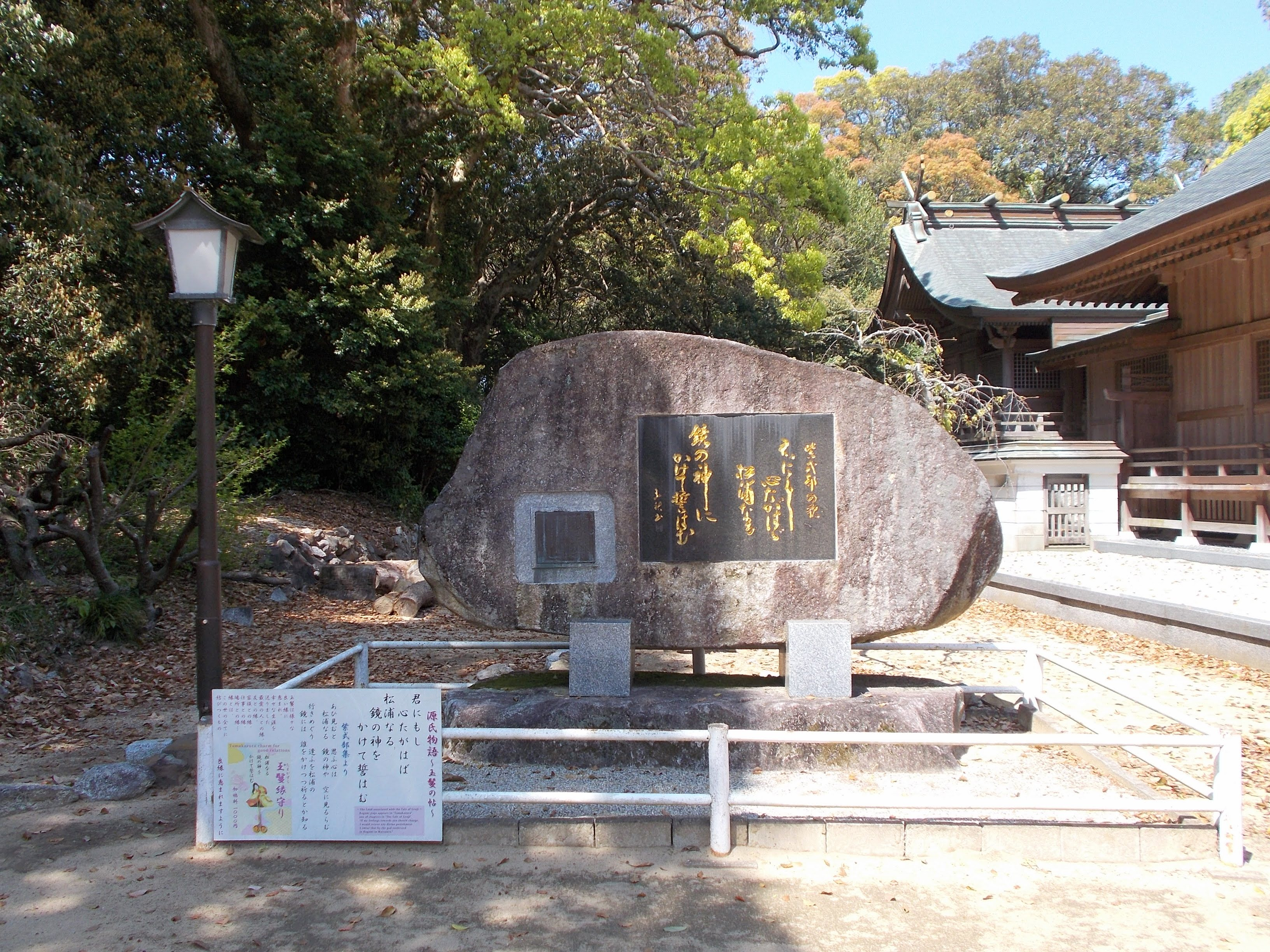
A Tanka monument of the Tale of Genji in the precinct.

== See also ==
- List of Shinto shrines
