= Fujiwara no Kiyokawa =

Japanese noble

Fujiwara no Kiyokawa 藤原清河
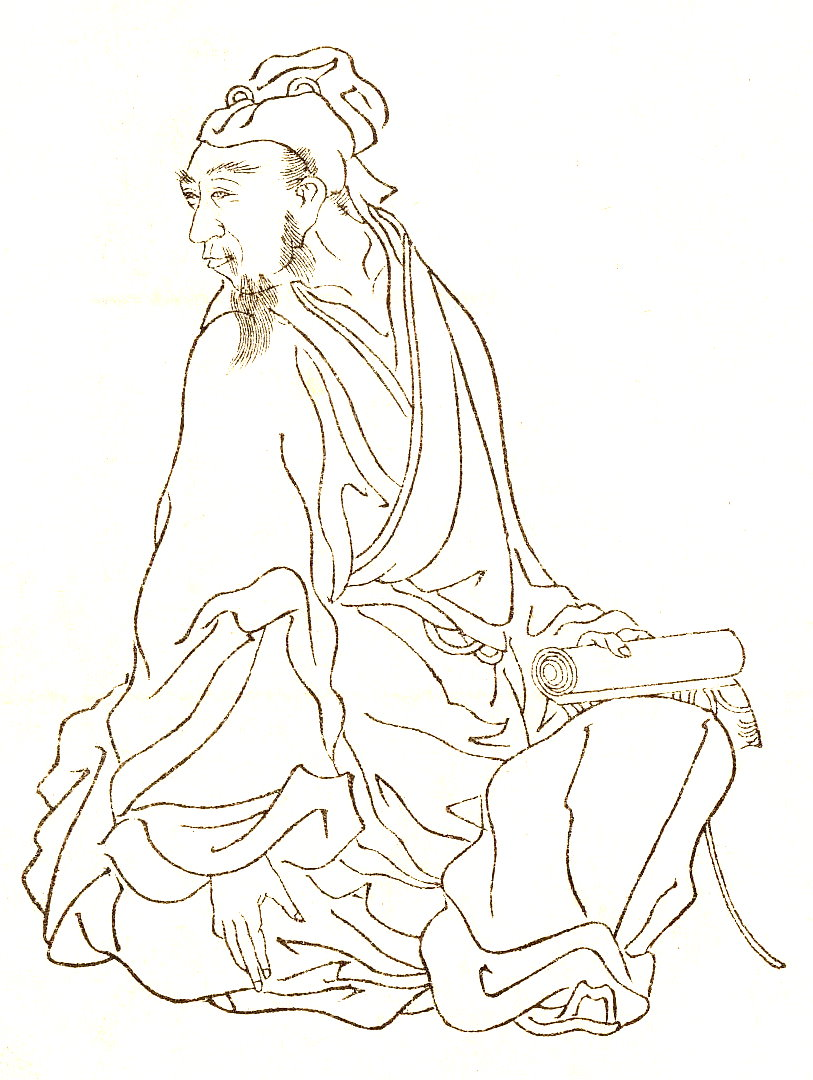
- Illustration by Kikuchi Yōsai, from Zenken Kojitsu
- Died: 778
- Family: Fujiwara Hokke
- Father: Fujiwara no Fusasaki

Fujiwara no Kiyokawa (藤原 清河; ?–778), also known by the Chinese-style name Heqing (河清), was a Japanese noble of the Nara period. He was the fourth son of the sangi Fujiwara no Fusasaki, the founder of the Fujiwara Hokke. He reached the court rank of ju san-mi (従三位) and the position of sangi, and was posthumously awarded the rank of ju ichi-i (従一位).

As an envoy to Tang China, he served the Tang court along with Abe no Nakamaro, but due to storms and the An Lushan Rebellion he was unable to return to his home, and served as a Tang official in China. He died in 778 while still in China and was posthumously promoted to grand governor general of Luzhou by the Tang.

== Life ==
In 740, Kiyokawa was promoted from shō roku-i no jō (正六位上) to ju go-i no ge (従五位下). He rose steadily in the court of Emperor Shōmu and was promoted to ju shi-i no ge (従四位下) in 746. With the ascension of Empress Kōken in 749, he was appointed as sangi, beating his older brother Fujiwara no Nagate to the ranks of the kugyō.

In 750, Kiyokawa was appointed envoy to Tang China, with Ōtomo no Komaro and Kibi no Makibi as vice-envoys. Before his departure, the Emperor gave him a symbolic sword (節刀, settō) as a sign of his command, and he was granted the rank of shō shi-i no ge (正四位下). Upon arriving in Tang China, the envoy entered Chang'an and had an audience with Emperor Xuanzong, who praised them as proper gentlemen.

At the New Year's greeting ceremony in 753 where the various domains offered well-wishes to the Tang Emperor, the Japanese delegation was seated in the second position on the west side, after the Tibetan Empire. Meanwhile, Silla was seated in the first position on the east side. Komaro protested, and the Japanese envoy changed seats with Silla in order to save face.

Almost a year later, Kiyokawa's group set out to return to Japan, accompanied by Abe no Nakamaro, who had lived in China for 35 years and was a high official there as well. The monk Jianzhen wished to accompany them, but as the Tang government had forbidden his departure from China, Kiyokawa refused him. However, the vice-envoy Komaro snuck him on board. Their ships departed from Yangzhou, but the boat carrying Kiyokawa and Nakamaro met a strong headwind and washed ashore farther south, in what is now southern Vietnam. The crew encountered bandits who attacked the ship, killing some of the crew, and most of the crew died of tropical diseases. Kiyokawa and Nakamaro barely escaped with their lives. The second ship, carrying Jianzhen, reached Japan without incident. In 755, Kiyokawa and Nakamaro returned to Chang'an. Kiyokawa took up the Tang-style name of Heqing (河清), and became the chief of the Secretary Ministry (秘書監).

In 759, a delegation led by Kō Gendo entered China through Balhae to take Kiyokawa home. However, because China was in a state of turmoil due to the An Lushan Rebellion, the Tang court forbade his return due to the danger of the roads. In 763, although Kiyokawa was still in China, the Japanese court appointed him governor of Hitachi Province, and in 764 he was promoted to ju san-mi (従三位).

Still unable to return to Japan, Kiyokawa spent another decade in China before another Japanese envoy arrived in 777, and in 778 he died, still in China. The Tang court granted him the posthumous rank of grand governor general of Luzhou (路州大都督). Having at some point married a Chinese woman, he had one daughter, named Kijō (喜娘), who accompanied the envoy back to Japan.
