= Inukami =

Inukami or Inugami (犬神 or 犬上) may refer to:

- Inukami District, Shiga
- Inugami, a mythological Japanese creature
- Inugami Gyōbu, a supernatural being in Japanese folklore

== People ==
- Inugami Korone (戌神ころね), a virtual YouTuber
- Inugami no Mitasuki (犬上 御田鍬), Japanese diplomat and court official
- Kira Inugami (狗神 煌), Japanese manga artist

== Fiction ==
- Inukami!, light novel series by Mamizu Arisawa and its manga and anime adaptations
- Inugami (manga), a Japanese manga series by Masaya Hokazono
- "Inugami" (Grimm), 2016 TV episode

== Fictional characters ==
- Kotaro Inugami, in the Negima! Magister Negi Magi franchise
- Yachiyo Inugami, in Inugami-san to Nekoyama-san
- Meril Inugami, in Shaman King: Power of Spirit
- Kishiru Inugami, in Shuten Order

== See also ==
- The Inugamis (disambiguation)
