= Fujiwara no Hirotsugu =

Japanese noble

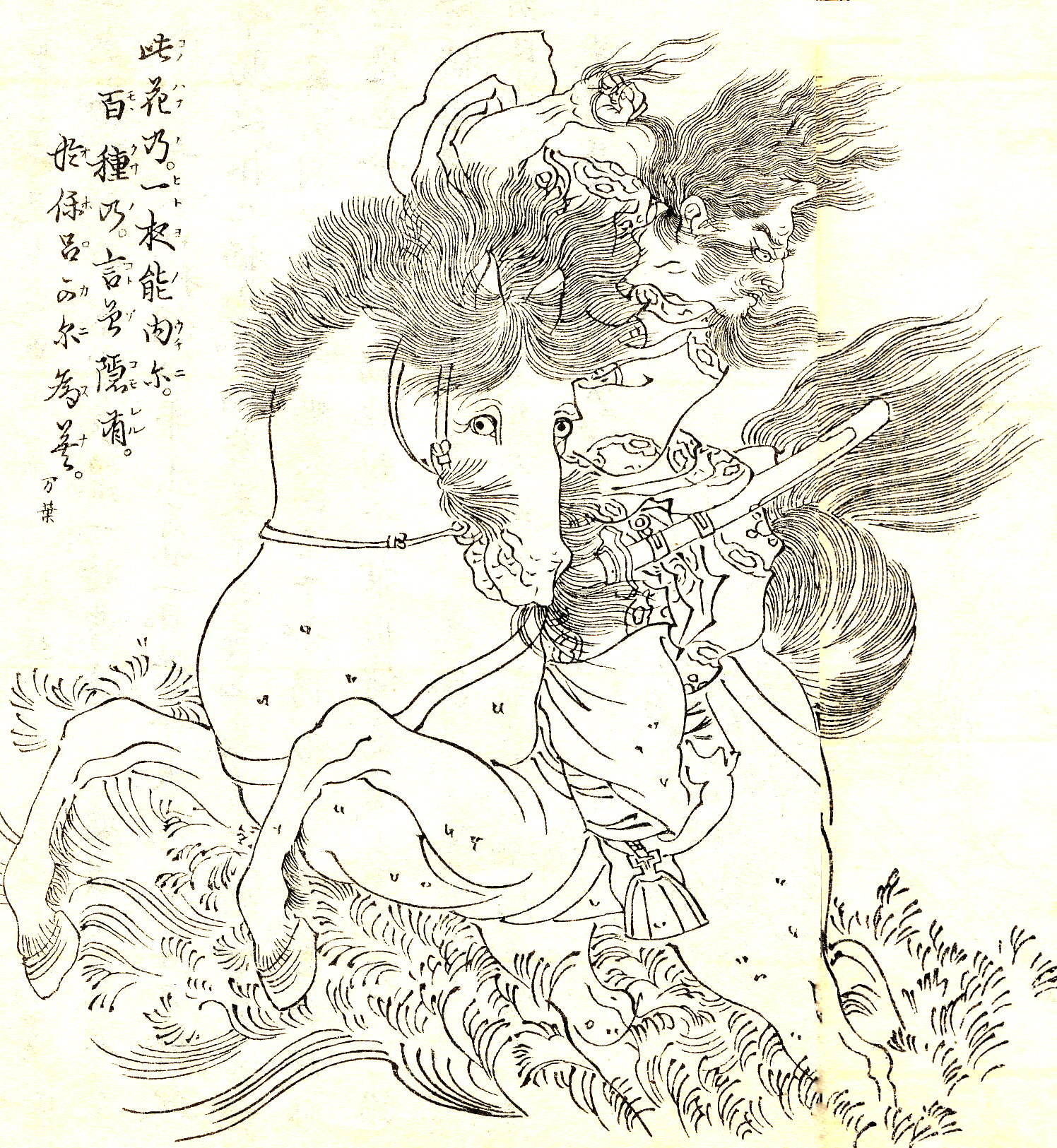
Fujiwara no Hirotsugu as illustrated in the Zenken Kojitsu

Fujiwara no Hirotsugu (藤原 広嗣; 714 – November 24, 740), was a noble of the Nara period. He was the eldest son of Fujiwara no Umakai, a councilor and founder of the Shikike branch of the Fujiwara clan. His court rank was Junior Fifth Rank, Lower Grade, and he served as Vice Governor of Dazaifu. While serving in that role, he petitioned for the removal of the monk Genbō and scholar Kibi no Makibi, who had quickly rose in prominence after they returned from a mission to Tang China with new scrolls and ideas. He then launched the Fujiwara no Hirotsugu Rebellion, but was defeated and executed.

== Early life ==
He was born as the eldest son of Fujiwara no Umakai. His exact birth year is unknown, but since his younger full brother Yoshitsugu was born in 716, Hirotsugu must have been born before that. Based on comparisons with a cousin born in 714, it is estimated that Hirotsugu was born around that time.

In 737, the four Fujiwara brothers, Muchimaro, Fusasaki, Maro and Hirotsugu's father Umakai, who had dominated the imperial court, died one after another from a devastating smallpox epidemic, with Umakai dying last in August. Hirotsugu first appears in historical records that September, when he was promoted three ranks at once to Junior Fifth Rank, Lower Grade. He later served as Assistant Minister of Ceremonial and concurrently as governor of Yamato Province.

== Career ==
=== Dazaifu ===
On December 4 of the same year, he was appointed Vice Governor (dazai shoni) of Dazaifu in Kyushu, which is generally considered to have been a demotion. In documents circulated by the court after his uprising describing his alleged wickedness, the reason for this demotion was said to be that he slandered relatives and disturbed family harmony. The relative he slandered is thought to have been his aunt, the Empress Dowager Fujiwara no Miyako, and it is assumed that he spread rumors about her relationship with the influential monk Genbō in order to argue for Genbō's removal.

The traditional view that Hirotsugu's rebellion was caused Emperor Shōmu's eastern tour is now largely rejected, another theory suggests that Hirotsugu opposed the emperor's planned relocation of the capital (from Heijō-kyō to Kuni-kyō), influenced by ideas from Tang China brought back by Genbō and the scholar Kibi no Makibi, and that he criticized them and was reassigned as a result.

When Hirotsugu arrived at Dazaifu, the position of governor-general (dazai dani) was vacant. On the same day, Takahashi no Yasumaro was appointed as senior deputy, and another official named Tajihi no Oji was already serving as junior deputy. However, there are no records of Hirotsugu's activities at Dazaifu before the rebellion.

In March 739, his maternal uncle Isonokami no Otomaro was exiled to Tosa Province for having an affair with Kume no Wakame, who was also exiled. Since exile was an excessively severe punishment for such an offense under the legal code, some scholars suggest that political factors, possibly involving Otomaro's connection to Hirotsugu, were behind the decision.

=== Rebellion ===
In August 740, Hirotsugu submitted a letter to the court stating that natural disasters were caused by the influence of Kibi no Makibi and the monk Genbō, who had both returned from a mission to Tang China with new ideas. He called for the two to be removed. This letter is preserved in a later source, though that source contains embellishments and errors; however, the text of the letter itself is generally considered reliable. In it, Hirotsugu cited omens and Genbō's alleged misconduct, advocated strengthening military preparedness, and criticized the government's reliance on the two men, offering to eliminate them.

According to the Shoku Nihongi, on September 3 news of his uprising reached the court, which then appointed Ōno no Azumabito as commander-in-chief and Ki no Iimaro as deputy commander, mobilizing 17,000 troops to suppress the rebellion. There is some debate, however, as to whether the court decided on mobilizing against Hirotsugu immediately after receiving his letter or only after learning of his actual uprising.

Ōno no Azumabito quickly advanced, and by September 21 had begun crossing from Nagato Province into Kyushu, attacking Hirotsugu's forces and achieving successes by the 24th. According to his report, Hirotsugu commanded more than 10,000 troops and faced the imperial army at the Itabitsu River, but his forces collapsed there, and no further battles are recorded.

=== Death ===
Hirotsugu attempted to flee but was captured on October 23 in Nagano Village on an island in Matsuura District, Hizen Province. On November 1, he was executed by beheading together with his younger brother Tsunate.

On January 22 of the following year (741), punishments for those involved were determined: 26 executions, 5 confiscations of property, 47 exiles, 32 imprisonments, and 177 floggings. Hirotsugu's younger brother Yoshitsugu was exiled to Izu Province, and Tamaro to Oki Province.

Genbō was later demoted in 745 and died the following year. The Shoku Nihongi records rumors that he was harmed by Hirotsugu's spirit. Kibi no Makibi was also later demoted to provincial posts, and similar rumors linked this to Hirotsugu's vengeful spirit, though Makibi ultimately lived a long life and rose to high office.

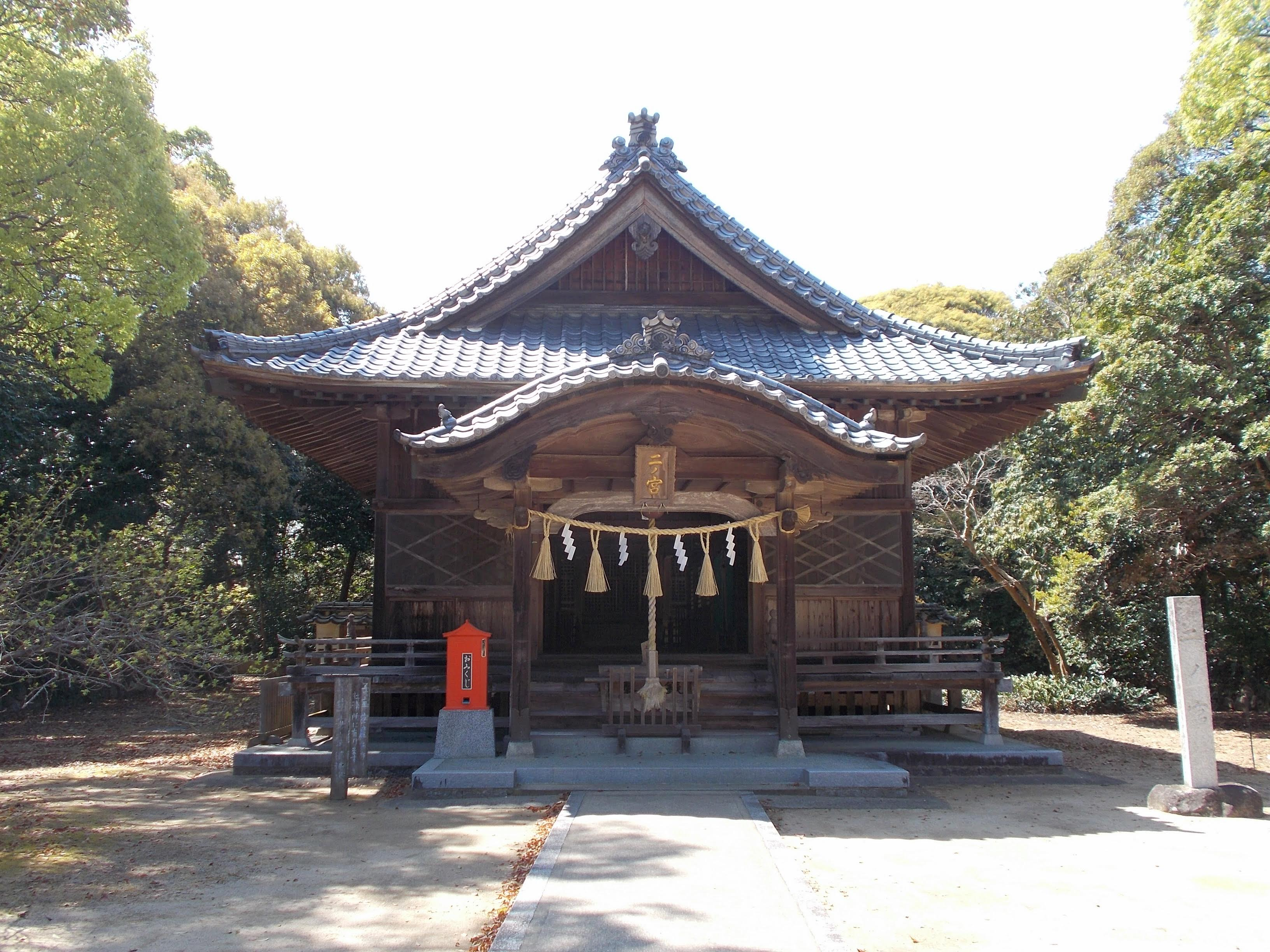
The second hall of Kagami-jinja, Karatsu, Saga, dedicated to Hirotsugu

Efforts to appease Hirotsugu's spirit began as early as 745, when monks were installed at a temple in Matsuura District and rice fields were granted for its support. The temple's purpose was described as pacifying the state and saving the spirits of the dead. Hirotsugu came to be worshipped as a vengeful spirit. Shrines dedicated to him include Shimogoryō Shrine in Kyoto and Goryō Shrine in Nara, as well as several in Kyushu such as Kagami Shrine in Karatsu and others.
