= Japanese missions to Sui China =

Japanese missions to Sui China represent a lens for examining and evaluating the relationship between the Sui dynasty and Japan in the 7th century. The nature of these bilateral contacts evolved gradually from political and ceremonial acknowledgment to cultural exchanges; and the process accompanied the growing commercial ties which developed over time.

Between 607 and 839, Japan sent 19 missions to Sui and Tang Empires of China (a mission planned for 894 was cancelled). Knowledge was the principal objective of each expedition. For example: Priests studied Chinese Buddhism. Officials studied Chinese government. Doctors studied Chinese medicine. Painters studied Chinese painting. Approximately one third of those who embarked from Japan did not survive to return home.

Year	Sender	Japanese envoys	Chinese monarch	Comments
607	Suiko	Ono no Imoko	Yang	Imoko's title was kenzuishi
608	Suiko	Ono no Imoko	Yang	Takamuko no Kuromaro (no Genri) and Minabuchi no Shōan, along with the Buddhist monk Sōmin remained in China for 32 years before returning to Japan. Like Imoko, the titles of Kuromaro and Shoan were kenzuishi
614	Suiko	Inugami no Mitasuki	Yang	Yatabe Zo traveled along with Mitasuki.

== See also ==
- Sinocentrism
- Japanese missions to Tang China
- Japanese missions to Ming China
- Japanese missions to Joseon
