= Japanese missions to Baekje =

Japanese missions to Baekje represent an aspect of the international relations of mutual Baekje-Japanese contacts and communication. The bilateral exchanges were intermittent.

The unique nature of these bilateral diplomatic exchanges evolved from a conceptual framework developed by the Chinese.

- 369-375 — Yamato Japan and Baekje maintain yearly exchanges of ambassadors.

According to the Nihon Shoki, in the years 501-700 Japan sent 328 official missions to Baekje, 316 to Silla, 146 to Goguryeo, 193 to Imna (Mimana), 20 to Gaya, 20 to Tamna, and 5 to Samhan kingdoms. Exchanges of embassies with the Korean kingdoms of Baekje and Silla were critical for informing the Japanese of cultural developments on the continent.

== See also ==
- Japanese missions to Silla
- Japanese missions to Joseon
- Japanese missions to Imperial China
