= Jinki (era) =

Period of Japanese history (724–729 CE)

Jinki (神亀) was a Japanese era name (年号, nengō, "year name") after Yōrō and before Tenpyō. This period spanned the years from February 724 through August 729. The reigning emperor was Shōmu-tennō (聖武天皇).

== Change of era ==
- 724 Jinki gannen (神亀元年): The previous era ended and the new one commenced in Yōrō 8, on the 4th day of the 2nd month of 724. The new era name meant "Sacred tortoise".

== Events of the Jinki era ==
- 727 (Jinki 4): The emperor sent commissioners into all the provinces to examine the administrations of the governors and the conduct of all public functionaries.
- 728 (Jinki 5): An ambassador from Korea was received in court.

== Notes ==
Preceded by Yōrō	Era or nengō Jinki; 724–729	Succeeded by Tenpyō
