= Fujiwara no Tsunetsugu =

Japanese diplomat

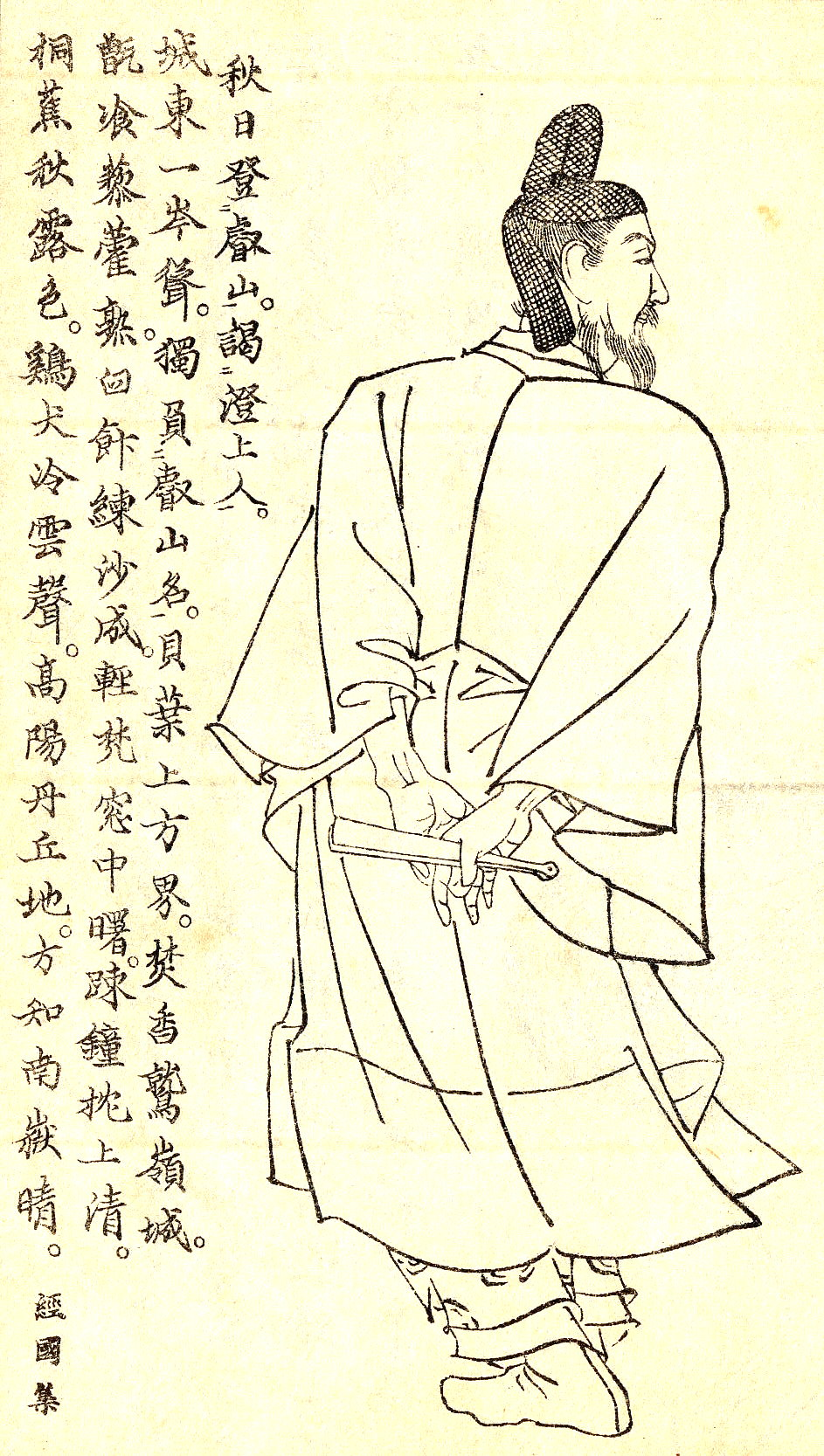
Fujiwara no Tsunetsugu

Fujiwara no Tsunetsugu (藤原常嗣, d. 840) was a Japanese diplomat.

== Mission to China ==
In 833, Emperor Ninmyō named Tsunetsugu the Imperial ambassador to China, with Ono Takamura his deputy. The principal aims of the mission was trade - books, art, and luxuries (such as perfume) were in high demand. The intended mission was ready by 836. Prayers at the Shintō shrine at Kitano were ordered in an attempt to ensure the success of the expedition. However, adverse weather conditions damaged the ships and forced the mission to unsuccessfully return to Japan. Due to the reluctance of the leaders to sail again, the second attempt came in 838. Takamura remained in Japan; he alleged that Tsunetsugu mistreated him. In 839 the expedition successfully reached China, after stopping in Korea to charter Korean ships, known to be of better quality than those made in Japan. He was the last envoy from Japan to China during the Heian period. The mission party included the Buddhist monk Ennin.

== Related pages ==
- Japanese missions to Tang China
