= Abe no Nakamaro =

Japanese poet and administrator in China

- 阿倍 仲麻呂
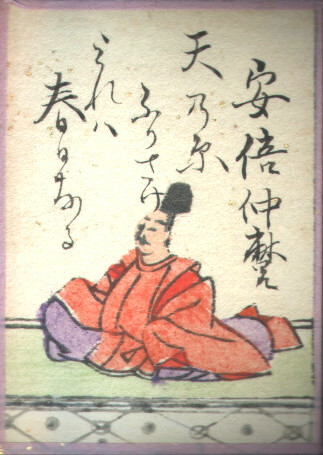
- Abe no Nakamaro from Hyakunin Isshu
- Born: c. 698; Yamato Province, Yamato (now Japan)
- Died: c. 770; Chang'an, Shaanxi Province, Imperial China
- Occupations: Poet, Japanese scholar, politician
- Writing career
- Language: Japanese
- Period: Nara period
- Genre: Waka
- Notable work: Hyakunin Isshu (contributor)

Abe no Nakamaro (阿倍 仲麻呂; c. 698 – c. 770), also known by his Chinese name Chao Heng (Chinese: 晁衡, pronounced Chōkō in Japanese), was a Japanese scholar and waka poet of the Nara period. He served on a Japanese envoy to Tang China and later became the Tang duhu (protectorate governor) of Annan (modern Vietnam).

== Early life ==
He was a descendant of Prince Hikofutsuoshi no Makoto, the son of Emperor Kōgen and first son of Abe no Funamori. As a young man he was admired for having outstanding academic skills.

== Career ==
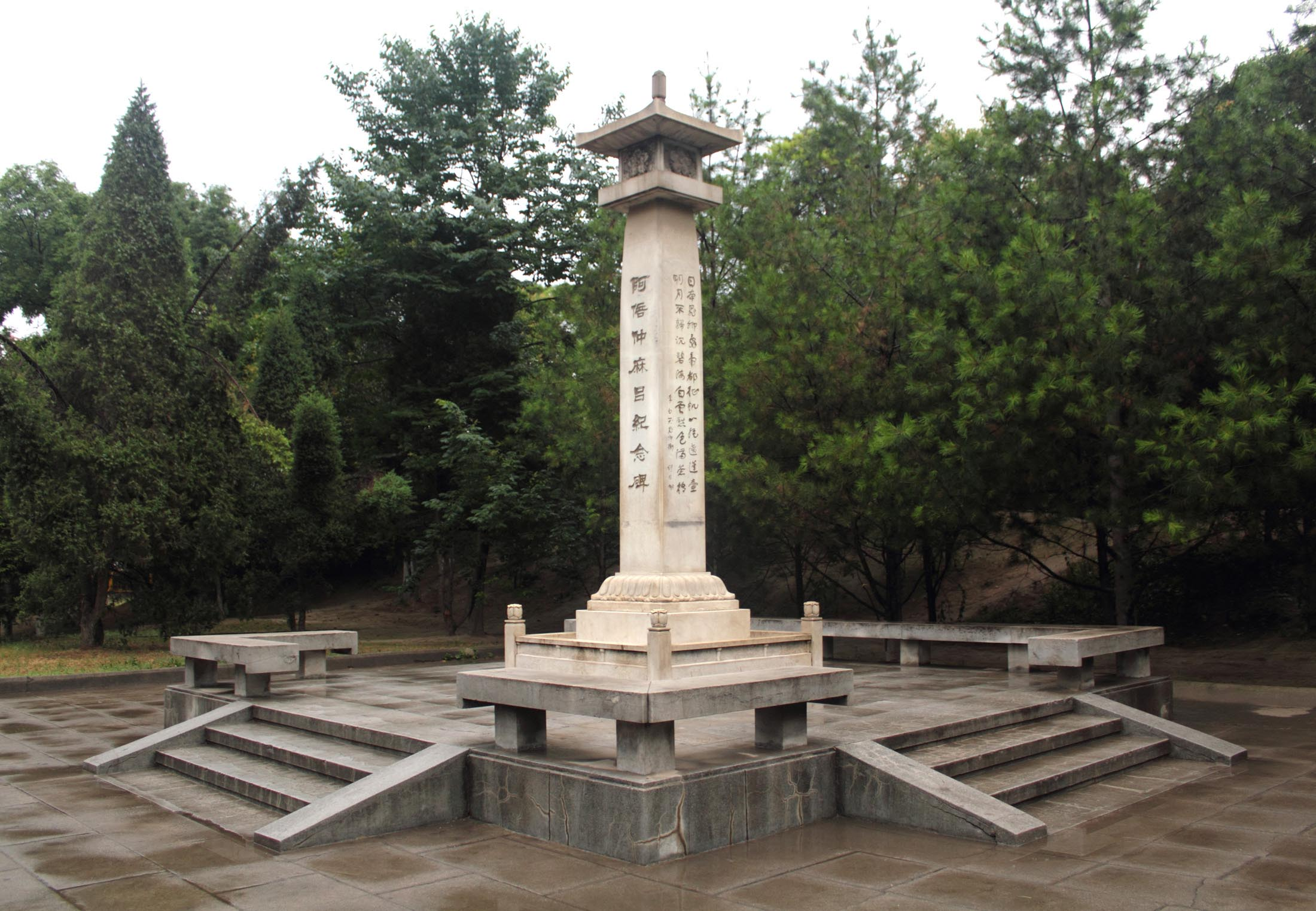
Memorial in Xi'an

In 717–718, he was a member of the Japanese mission to Tang China (Kentōshi) along with Kibi no Makibi and Genbō. They returned to Japan; he did not.

In China, he passed the civil-service examination. Around 725, he took an administrative position and was promoted in Luoyang in 728 and 731. Around 733 he received Tajihi Hironari, who would command the Japanese diplomatic mission.

In 734, Abe tried to return to Japan, but the ship that was to take him back sank not long into the journey, forcing him to remain in China for several more years. In 752, he tried again to return, with the mission to China led by Fujiwara no Kiyokawa, but the ship he was traveling in was wrecked and ran aground off the coast of Annan (modern day northern Vietnam). He managed to return to Chang'an in 755.

After the An Lushan Rebellion started later in 755, it became unsafe to return to Japan and Nakamaro abandoned his hopes of returning to his homeland. He took several government posts and rose to serve as Duhu (Governor-protector) of Annam between 761 and 767, residing in Hanoi. He then returned to Chang'an and was once again planning his return to Japan when he died in 770, at the age of 72.

Abe was a close friend of the Chinese poets Li Bai and Wang Wei, Zhao Hua, Bao Xin, and Chu Guangxi. Nakamaro was known while in China by the name Chao Heng (Chinese: 晁衡/朝衡). When Nakamaro's ship was wrecked, Li Bai prematurely assumed Chao's (Nakmaro's) demise and wrote a quatrain lamenting the loss (saying his ship has encircled Penglai, i.e., the Otherworld).

== Legacy ==
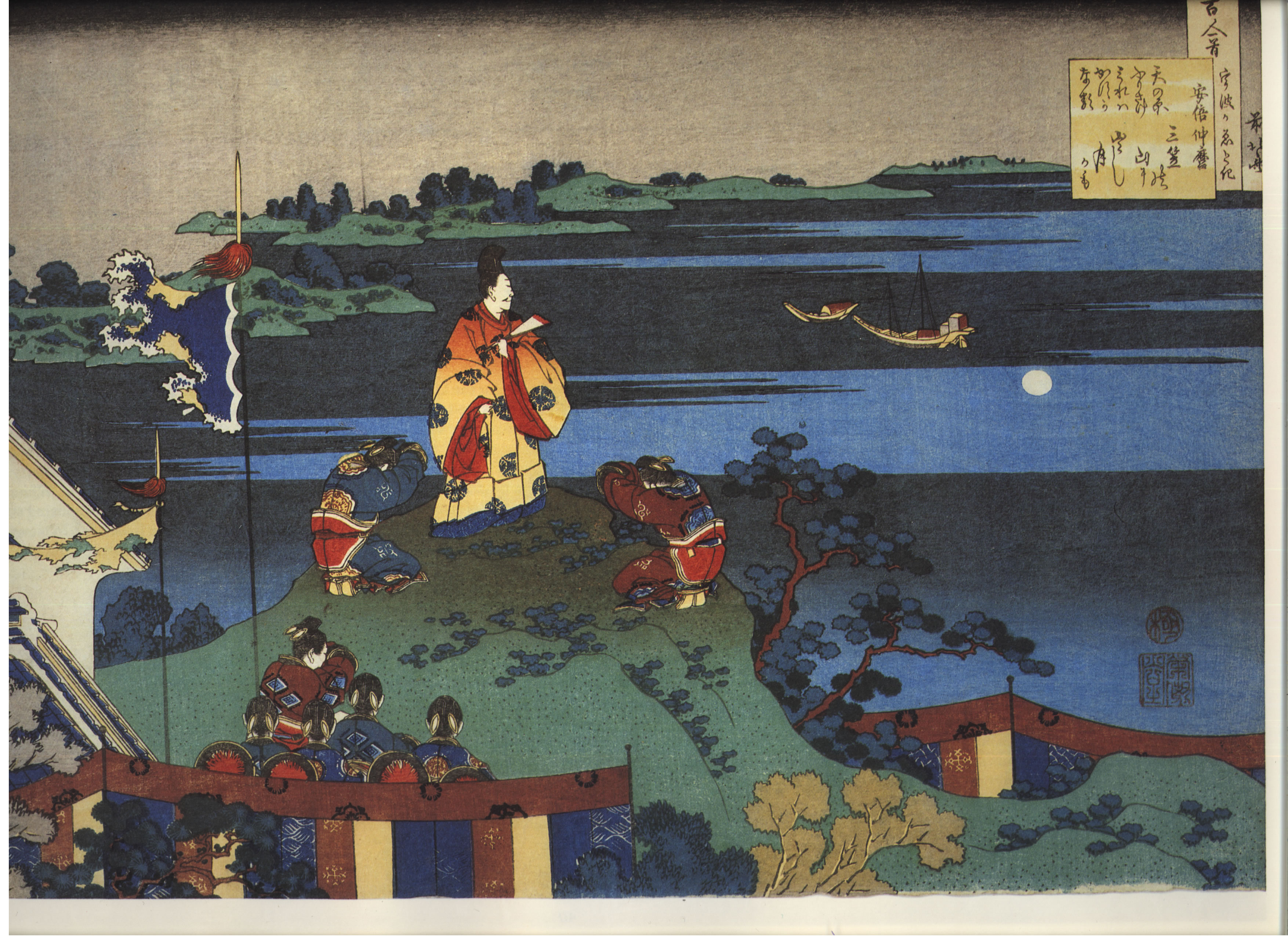
This image of Abe no Nakamaro is part of Hokusai's series of One Hundred Poets

Abe is known for a poem filled with intense longing for his home in Nara. One of his poems was included in the anthology Hyakunin Isshu:

天の原ふりさけ見れば春日なる
三笠の山に出し月かも
ama no hara furisakemireba Kasuga naru
Mikasa-no-yama ni ideshi tsuki ka mo
When I look up into the vast sky tonight, is it the same moon that I saw rising from behind Mt. Mikasa at Kasuga Shrine all those years ago?
(Kokin Wakashū 9:406)

Abe's place in Japanese cultural history is confirmed in Hokusai's Hyakunin Isshu series of ukiyo-e woodblock prints.

== See also ==
- Japanese missions to Imperial China
- Japanese missions to Tang China

== Bibliography ==
- McMillan, Peter (2010). One Hundred Poets, One Poem Each: A Translation of the Ogura Hyakunin Isshu. New York: Columbia University Press. ISBN 9780231143998.
