= Emperor Shōmu =

Emperor of Japan from 724 to 749

Emperor Shōmu 聖武天皇
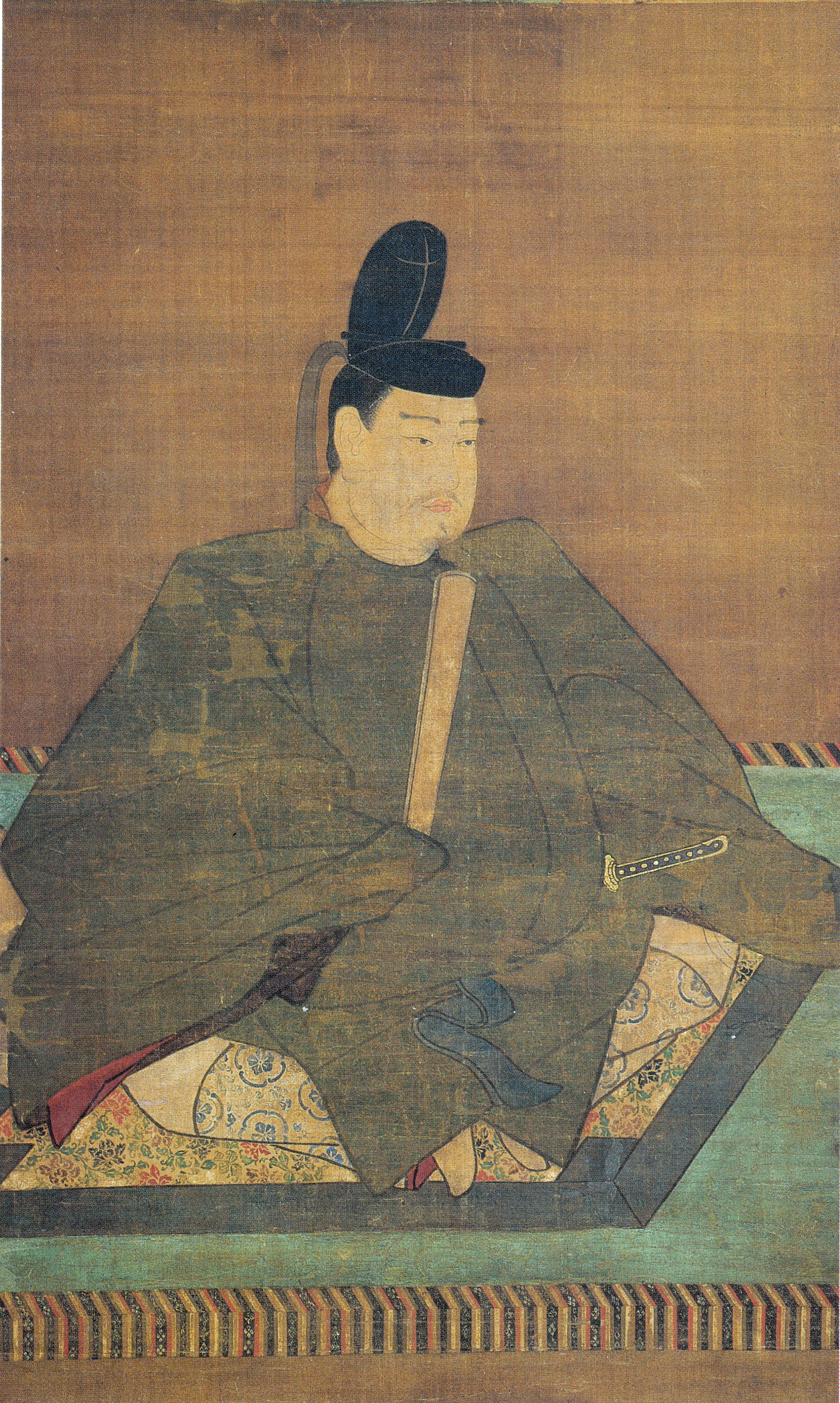
- Portrait of Emperor Shōmu, 13th century

Emperor of Japan
- Reign: March 3, 724 – August 19, 749
- Predecessor: Genshō
- Successor: Kōken
- Born: Obito (首); 22 September 701
- Died: 4 June 756 (aged 54); Nara, Japan
- Burial: Sahoyama no minami no misasagi (佐保山南陵) (Nara)
- Spouse: Fujiwara no Asukabe-hime
- Issue: Empress Kōken; Prince Motoi; Princess Inoe; Princess Fuwa; Prince Asaka
Posthumous name
- Chinese-style shigō: Emperor Shōmu (聖武天皇); Emperor Shōhō-kanjin-shōmu (勝宝感神聖武皇帝) Japanese-style shigō: Ameshirushikunioshiharakitoyosakurahiko no Sumeramikoto (天璽国押開豊桜彦天皇)
- House: Imperial House of Japan
- Father: Emperor Monmu
- Mother: Fujiwara no Miyako
- Religion: Buddhism

Emperor Shōmu (聖武天皇, Shōmu-tennō; September 22, 701 – June 4, 756) was the 45th emperor of Japan, according to the traditional order of succession. Shōmu's reign spanned the years 724 through 749, during the Nara period.

== Traditional narrative ==
Before his ascension to the Chrysanthemum Throne, his personal name (imina) is not clearly known, but he was known as Oshi-hiraki Toyosakura-hiko-no-mikoto.

Shōmu was the son of Emperor Monmu and Fujiwara no Miyako, a daughter of Fujiwara no Fuhito.

Shōmu had five consorts and six Imperial sons and daughters.

=== Events of Shōmu's reign ===
Shōmu was still a child at the time of his father's death; thus, his grandmother, Empress Gemmei, and aunt, Empress Gensho, occupied the throne before he acceded.

- 724 (Yōrō 8, 1st month): In the 9th year of Genshō-tennō's reign (元正天皇九年), the empress abdicated; and her nephew received the succession (‘‘senso’’). Shortly thereafter, Emperor Shōmu is said to have acceded to the throne (‘‘sokui’’).
- January 31, 724 (Jinki 1): The era name is changed to mark the accession of Emperor Shōmu.
- 735–737: A major smallpox epidemic raged throughout Japan, incurring adult mortality rates of about 25% to 35%.

Shōmu continued to reside in the Hezei Palace.

Shōmu is known as the first emperor whose consort was not born into the imperial household. His consort Kōmyō was a non-royal Fujiwara commoner. A ritsuryō office was created for the queen-consort, the Kogogushiki; and this bureaucratic innovation continued into the Heian period.

==== Emperor Shōmu's tour to the eastern provinces ====
While battle maneuvers of the Fujiwara no Hirotsugu Rebellion were still underway, in Tenpyō 12 10th month (November, 740) Emperor Shōmu left the capital at Heijō-kyō (Nara) and traveled eastward via Horikoshi (Note: temporary lodging built to accommodate an Imperial visit) (堀越頓宮; today Tsuge; 10th month, 29th day: November 22), Nabari (10th month, 30th day: November 23), Ao (安保頓宮; today Aoyama; 11th month 1st day: November 24) to Kawaguchi in Ichishi District, Ise Province (today part of Tsu, formerly part of Hakusan) where he retreated together with his court to a temporary palace. One of his generals was left in command of the capital. Presumably Shōmu feared Fujiwara supporters in Nara and was hoping to quell potential uprisings in other parts of the country with his presence. After four days travelling through heavy rain and thick mud, the party reached Kawaguchi on Tenpyō 12 11th month, 2nd day (25 November, 740) A couple of days later, they learn of Hirotsugu's execution and that the rebellion had been quelled.

Despite the good news, Shōmu did not return to Heijō-kyō immediately, but stayed in Kawaguchi until Tenpyō 12 11th month, 11th day (4 December, 740). He continued his journey east, then north via Mino Province and back west along the shores of Lake Biwa to Kuni in Yamashiro Province (today in Kizugawa) which he reached on Tenpyō 12 12th month, 15th day (6 January, 741). Places passed along the way included Akasaka (赤坂頓宮; today Suzuka; 11th m. 14th d.: Dec 7）, Asake district (朝明郡; today Yokkaichi; 11th m. 20th d.: Dec 13）, Ishiura (石占頓宮; today Tado; 11th m. 25th d.: Dec 18）, Tagi district (当伎郡; today Yōrō; 11th m. 26th d.: Dec 19）, Fuwa (不破頓宮; today Tarui; 12th m. 1st d.: Dec 23）, Yokokawa (横川頓宮; today Santō or Maihara; 12th m. 6th d.: Dec 28), Inukami (犬上頓宮; today Hikone; 12th m. 7th d.: Dec 29）, Gamō district (蒲生郡; today near Yōkaichi; 12th m. 9th d.: Dec 31）, Yasu (野洲頓宮; today Yasu or Moriyama; 12th m. 10th d.: Jan 1）, Awazu (禾津頓宮; today Ōtsu; 12th m. 11th d.： Jan 2）, Tamanoi (玉井頓宮; today Yamashina-ku, Kyoto; 12th m. 14th d.）. Situated among the hills and near a river north of Nara, Kuni was easily defensible. In addition, the area was linked with the Minister of the Right, Tachibana no Moroe, while Nara was a center of the Fujiwara clan. On Tenpyō 12 12th month, 15 day (6 January, 741) Shōmu proclaimed a new capital at Kuni-kyō.

=== Timeline ===
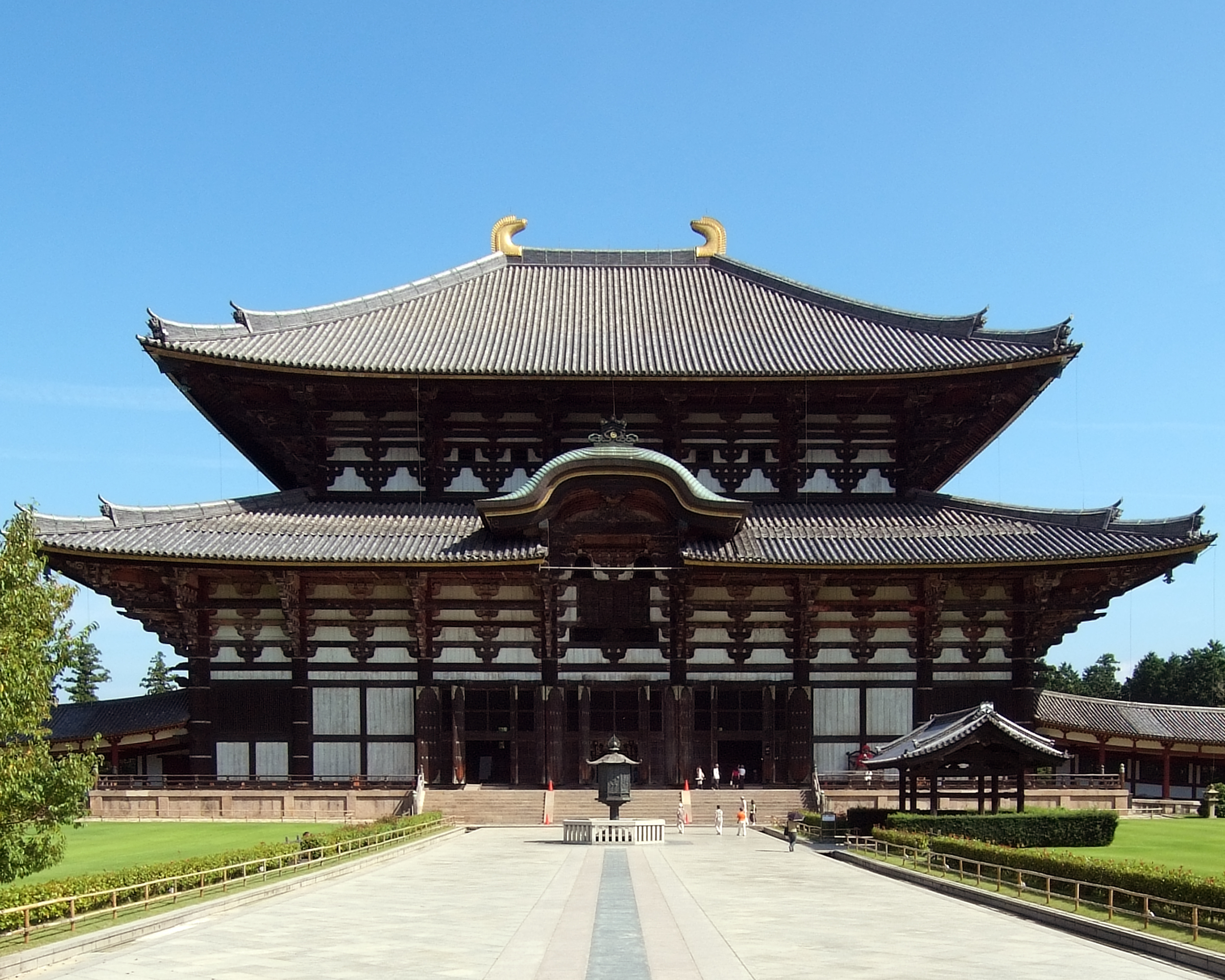
Tōdai-ji

- 724 (Jinki 1): Emperor Shōmu rises to throne.
- 740 (Tenpyō 12, 8th month): In the Imperial court in Nara, Kibi no Makibi and Genbō conspire to discredit Fujiwara no Hirotsugu, who is Dazai shoni in Kyushu.
- 740 (Tenpyō 12, 9th month): Hirotsugu rebels in reaction to the growing influence of Genbō and others.
- 740 (Tenpyō 12, 9th month): Under the command of Ōno no Azumabito, an Imperial army of 17,000 is sent to Kyushu to stop the potential disturbance.
- 740 (Tenpyō 12, 10th month): Hirotsugu is decisively beaten in battle; and he is beheaded in Hizen Province.
- 740 (Tenpyō 12): The capital is moved to Kuni-kyō
- 741 (Tenpyō 13): The Emperor calls for nationwide establishment of provincial temples. Provincial temples ("kokubunji") and provincial nunneries ("kokubunniji") were established throughout the country. The more formal name for these "kokubunji" was "konkomyo-shitenno-gokoku no tera" (meaning "temples for the protection of the country by the four guardian deities of the golden light"). The more formal name for these "bokubunniji" was "hokke-metuzai no tera" (meaning "nunneries for eliminating sin by means of the Lotus Sutra").
- 743 (Tenpyō 15): The Emperor issues a rescript to build the Daibutsu (Great Buddha), later to be completed and placed in Tōdai-ji, Nara.
- 743 (Tenpyō 15): The law of Perpetual Ownership of Cultivated Lands (墾田永代私財法) issued
- 744 (Tenpyō 16): In the spring, the court was moved to Naniwa-kyō which then became the new capital.
- 745 (Tenpyō 17): The Emperor declares by himself Shigaraki-kyō the capital
- 745 (Tenpyō 17): The capital returns to Heijō-kyō, construction of the Great Buddha resumes.
- 749 (Tenpyō 21, 4th month): Shōmu, accompanied by the empress, their children, and all the great men and women of the court, went in procession to Todai-ji. The emperor stood before the statue of the Buddha and proclaimed himself to be a disciple of the three jewels, which are the Buddha, the Dharma, and the Sangha.
- 749 (Tenpyō 21, 7th month): After a 25-year reign, Emperor Shōmu abdicates in favor of his daughter, Princess Takano, who would become Empress Kōken. After abdication, Shōmu took the tonsure, thus becoming the first retired emperor to become a Buddhist priest. Empress Komyo, following her husband's example, also took holy vows in becoming a Buddhist nun.
- 752 (Tenpyō-shōhō 4, 4th month): The Eye-Opening Ceremony, presided over by Rōben and celebrating the completion of the Great Buddha, is held at Tōdai-ji.

=== Legacy ===
Shōmu, a devout Buddhist, is best remembered for commissioning, in 743, the sixteen-meter high statue of the Vairocana Buddha (the Daibutsu) in Tōdai-ji of Nara. At the time, this was such a massive undertaking that later chroniclers accuse him of having completely exhausted the country's reserves of bronze and precious metals. In 752, the Shōmu held the Eye-opening Ceremony of the Great Buddha.

Earlier in 741, he established the system of provincial temples, making this the closest anyone ever came to declaring Japan a Buddhist nation. In addition he commissioned the observance of the ohigan holiday for both spring and autumnal equinox.

Emperor Shōmu died at age 54.

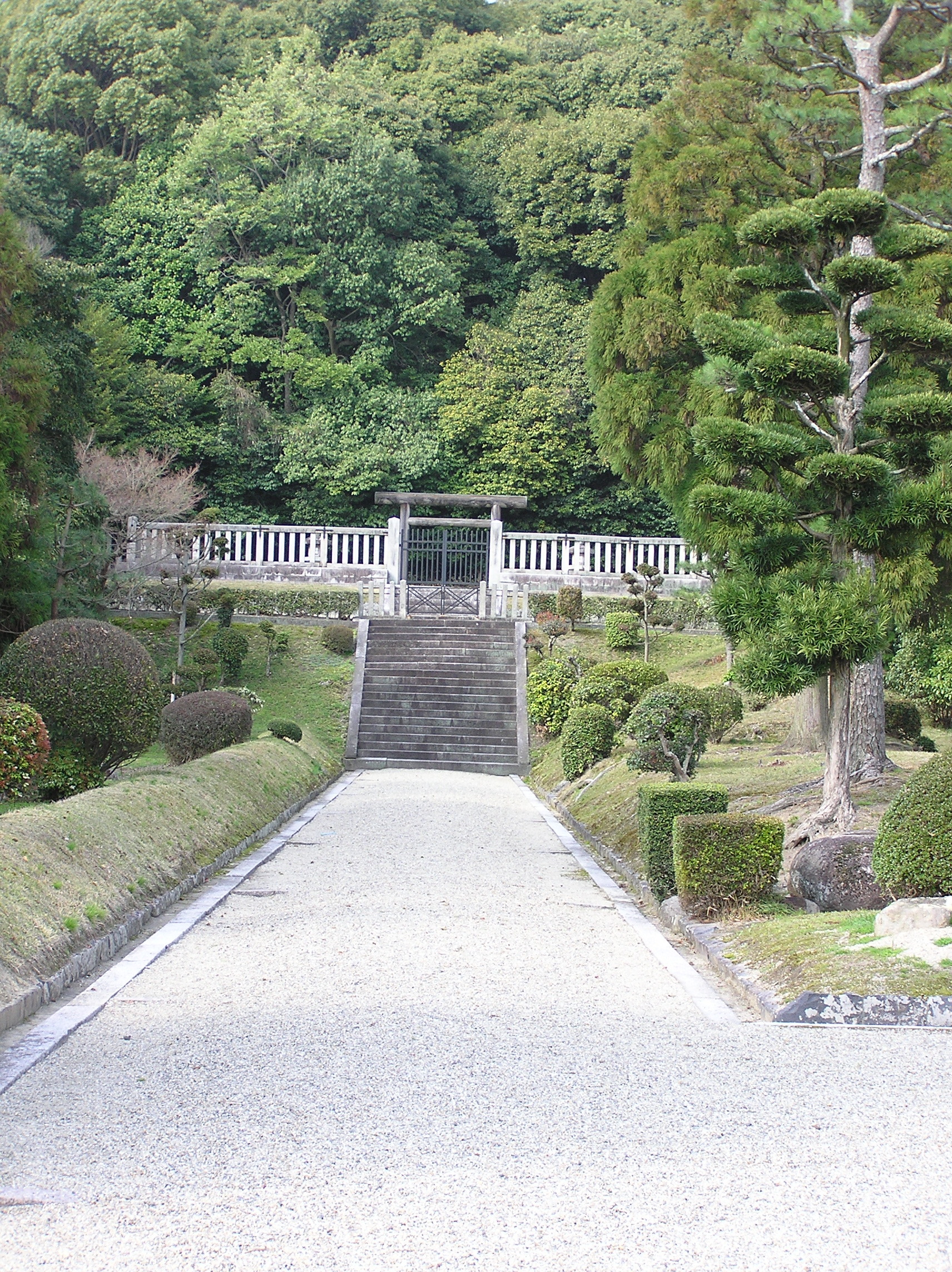
Memorial Shinto shrine and mausoleum honoring Emperor Shōmu

The actual site of Shōmu's grave is known. This emperor is traditionally venerated at a memorial Shinto shrine (misasagi) at Nara.

The Imperial Household Agency designates this location as Shōmu's mausoleum. It is formally named Sahoyama no minami no misasagi. The tomb site can be visited today in Horenji-cho, Tenri City near Nara City. The Imperial tomb of Shōmu's consort, Empress Kōmyō, is located nearby.

=== Shōsōin ===
The Shōsō-in (正倉院) is the treasure house of Tōdai-ji Temple in Nara, Japan. It houses about 9.000 artifacts connected to Emperor Shōmu (701–756) and Empress Kōmyō (701–760), as well as arts and crafts of the Tempyō era of Japanese history. Its general importance derives from the fact, that it may be called an ark of Tang dynasty period cultural relics from Japan as well as from the continent: furniture, games, music instruments, clothing/accessories, weaponry, buddhist objects and pieces of writing. See main entry.

=== Kugyō ===
Kugyō (公卿) is a collective term for the very few most powerful men attached to the court of the Emperor of Japan in pre-Meiji eras.

In general, this elite group included only three to four men at a time. These were hereditary courtiers whose experience and background would have brought them to the pinnacle of a life's career. During Shōmu's reign, this apex of the Daijō-kan included:

- Daijō-daijin (720–735), Toneri-shinnō (舎人親王) (9th son of Emperor Tenmu).
- Daijō-daijin (737–745), Suzuka-ō (鈴鹿王) (son of Prince Takechi).
- Sadaijin (724–729), Nagaya-ō (長屋王) (son of Prince Takechi).
- Sadaijin (743–756), Tachibana no Moroe (橘諸兄) (formerly Katsuragi-ō, Prince Katsuragi) (half brother of Empress Kōmyō) .
- Udaijin (734–737), Fujiwara no Muchimaro (藤原武智麻呂) (son of Fujiwara no Fuhito).
- Naidaijin, Fujiwara no Toyonari (藤原豊成) (son of Fujiwara no Muchimaro).
- Dainagon, Fujiwara no Fusasaki (藤原房前) (son of Fujiwara no Fuhito).

== Eras of Shōmu's life ==
The years of Shōmu's reign are more specifically identified by more than one era name or nengō.

- Jinki (724–729)
- Tenpyō (729–749)
- Tenpyō-kanpō (749)
- Tenpyō-shōhō (749–757)

== Consorts and children ==
- Empress (Kōgō): Fujiwara Asukabehime (藤原 安宿媛), Fujiwara no Fuhito’s daughter
  - Second Daughter: Imperial Princess Abe (阿倍内親王) later Empress Kōken
  - First Son: Prince Motoi (基王, 727–728)
- Bunin: Agatainukai no Hirotoji (県犬養広刀自, d.762), Agatainukai no Morokoshi's daughter
  - First Daughter: Imperial Princess Inoe (井上内親王), married to Emperor Kōnin
  - Third Daughter: Imperial Princess Fuwa (不破内親王, 723–795), married to Prince Shioyaki
  - Second Son: Imperial Prince Asaka (安積親王, 728–744)
- Bunin: Nan-dono (南殿, d.748), Fujiwara no Muchimaro’s daughter
- Bunin: Hoku-dono (北殿, d.760), Fujiwara no Fusasaki’s daughter
- Bunin: Tachibana-no-Hirooka no Konakachi (橘広岡古那可智, d.759), Tachibana no Sai's daughter

== Ancestry ==
Ancestors of Emperor Shōmu

8. Emperor Tenmu (c. 631–686)
4. Crown Prince Kusakabe (662–689)
9. Empress Jitō (645–703)
2. Emperor Monmu (683–707)
10. Emperor Tenji (626–672)
5. Empress Genmei (660–721)
11. Mei no Iratsume
1. Emperor Shōmu
12. Fujiwara no Kamatari (614–669)
6. Fujiwara no Fuhito (659–720)
13. Yoshiko
3. Fujiwara no Miyako (c. 683–754)
14. Kamo no Emishi
7. Kamo no Hime

== See also ==
- Emperor of Japan
- Imperial cult
- List of Emperors of Japan

== Notes ==
Japanese Imperial kamon – a stylized chrysanthemum blossom

Regnal titles
Preceded by Empress Genshō	Emperor of Japan: Shōmu; 724–749	Succeeded by Empress Kōken
