= Tenpyō-kanpō =

Period of Japanese history (749 CE)

Tenpyō-kanpō (天平感宝) was a Japanese era name (年号, nengō, "year name") after Tenpyō and before Tenpyō-shōhō. This period spanned mere months, April through July 749. The reigning emperor was Shōmu-tennō (聖武天皇).

== Change of era ==
- 749 Tenpyō-kanpō gannen (天平感宝元年): The new era name Tenpyō-kanpō is not found in some chronologies because its duration was so limited—a period of four months during the last year of Shōmu's reign. The previous era ended and this new one commenced in Tenpyō 21, on the 14th day of the 4th month of 749. At some point shortly thereafter, the emperor determined to abdicate. Shōmu became the first emperor who renounced his throne to take the tonsure as a Buddhist monk. His wife, Empress Kōmyō, followed her husband's example by entering holy orders as well. Shōmu's reign and this era ended simultaneously. Also at this same time, the former-Emperor Shōmu began a new phase of his life and Shōmu's daughter began her reign.

== Events of the Tenpyō-kanpō era ==
- 749 (Tenpyō-kanpō 1, 2nd day of the 7th month): In the 25th year of Shōmu-tennōs reign (聖武天皇25年), the emperor abdicated; and the succession (senso) was received by his daughter. Shortly thereafter, Empress Kōken is said to have acceded to the throne (sokui).
- 749 (Tenpyō-kanpō 1, 2nd day of the 7th month): To mark Empress Kōken's enthronement, the truncated Tenpyō-kanpō era is superseded by the new Tenpyō-Shōhō era.

== Notes ==
Preceded by Tenpyō	Era or nengō Tenpyō-kanpō; 749	Succeeded by Tenpyō-shōhō
