= The Inugamis =

The Inugamis can refer to:

- The Inugamis (1976 film), a 1976 Japanese film directed by Kon Ichikawa
- The Inugamis (2006 film), a 2006 Japanese film directed by Kon Ichikawa, a remake of his 1976 film
