= Japanese missions to Silla =

Japanese missions to Silla represent an aspect of the international relations of mutual Silla-Japanese contacts and communication. The bilateral exchanges were intermittent.

The unique nature of these bilateral diplomatic exchanges evolved from a conceptual framework developed by the Chinese.

- 648 — At the request of Japanese government, the Silla ambassador in China delivers a Japanese letter to the court of the Tang emperor; the message conveyed a message wishing good health to the emperor.
- 804 — Mine no Masatao sent with letters from Japanese Council of State.
- 836 — Ki no Mitsu with letter from Council of State.

According to the Nihon Shoki, in the years 501-700 Japan sent 328 official missions to Paekche, 316 to Silla, 146 to Goguryeo, 193 to Imna (Mimana), 20 to Gaya, 20 to Tamna, and 5 to Samhan kingdoms. Exchanges of embassies with the Korean kingdoms of Paekche and Silla were critical for informing the Japanese of cultural developments on the continent.

== See also ==
- Japanese missions to Paekche
- Japanese missions to Joseon
- Japanese missions to Imperial China
