= Genbō =

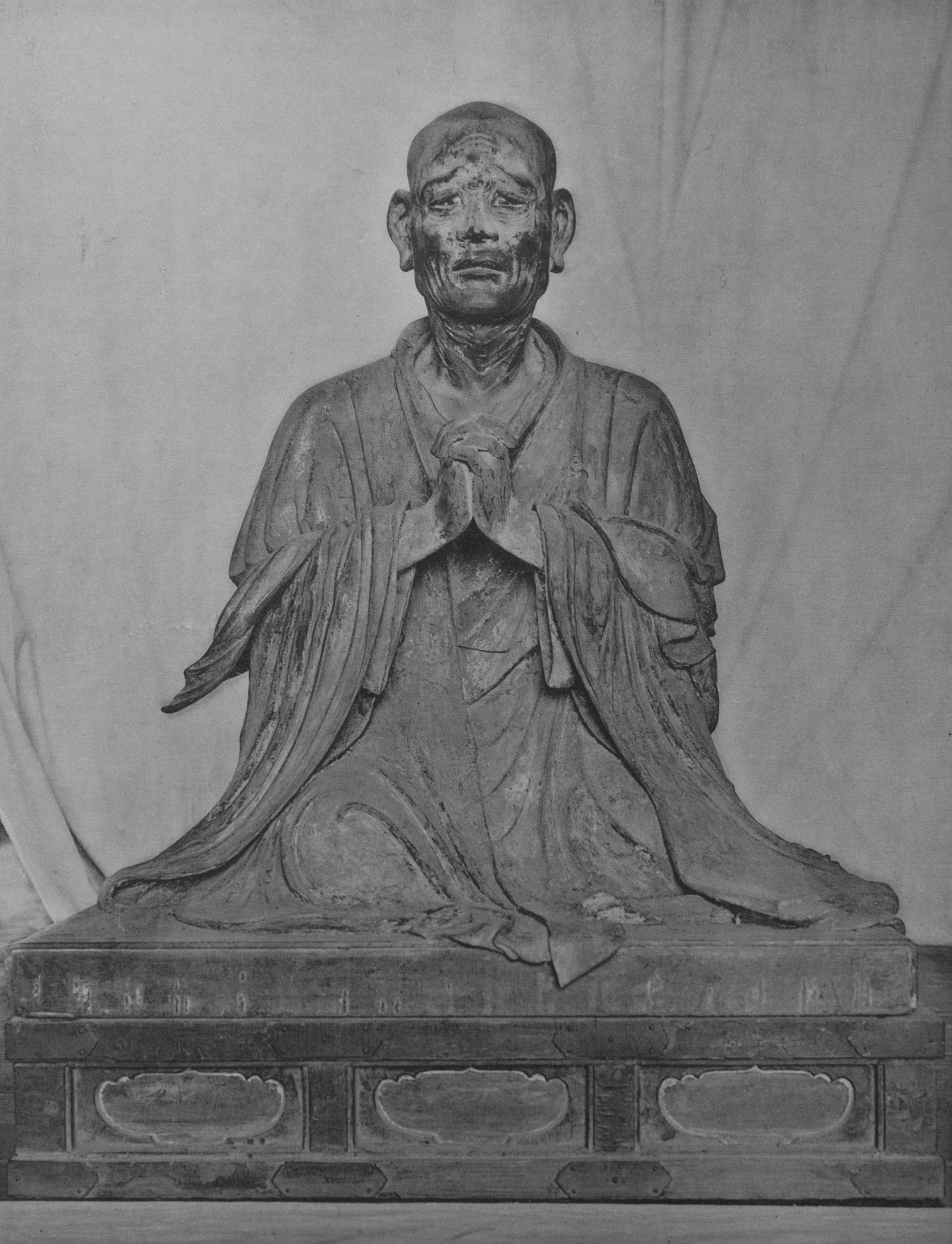
12th century statue of Genbō in prayer (NT) (Kōfuku-ji)

Genbō (玄昉; d. 746) was a Japanese scholar-monk and bureaucrat of the Imperial Court at Nara. He is best known as a leader of the Hossō sect of Buddhism and as the adversary of Fujiwara no Hirotsugu.

== Career ==
In 717–718, Genbō was part of the Japanese mission to Tang China (Kentōshi) along with Kibi no Makibi, Abe no Nakamaro. Later Bodhisena also joined as their companion. Genbō stayed in China for 17 years. Genbō brought many esoteric Buddhist texts with him when he returned to Japan.

At Kōfuku-ji, he was appointed abbot (sōjō) by Emperor Shōmu.

=== Timeline ===
- 740 (Tenpyō 12): Hirotsugu petitioned for the removal of Genbō; and then Kibi no Makibi and Genbō used this complaint as a pretext to discredit Hirotsugu. As a result, Hirotsugu initiates a futile military campaign in the 9th month of the same year.
- 745 (Tenpyō 17): Genbō was exiled to Dazaifu on the island of Kyushu.

At the time of Genbō's death, it was popularly believed that he was killed by the vengeful spirit of Hirotsugu.

== See also ==
- Japanese missions to Imperial China
- Japanese missions to Tang China
- Dōkyō
