= Inugami no Mitasuki =

Japanese diplomat

Inugami no Mitasuki (Japanese: 犬上 御田鍬) was a Japanese diplomat and Imperial court official in the Asuka period. He is best known for his role in the Japanese missions to Sui China. His kabane title is Kimi and kan'i rank is Dainin.

== Lineage ==
The Inukami no Kimi clan descended from Prince Inayoriwake, son of Yamato Takeru. The clan name comes from Inukami-gun in Ōmi Province (currently Inukami-gun and Hikone, Shiga Prefecture).

== Life ==
In 614, Inugami went to Sui as the last Japanese mission to Sui China with Yatabe Zo. The following year (615), Empress Suiko returned to Japan with a Baekje diplomat.

In 630, Inugami was sent to Tang along with Yakushi no Enihi as the ambassador of the first envoy to Tang (at the time, the two had the kan'i rank of Dainin). In 631, the diplomats had an audience with the Emperor Taizong of Tang. Taizong pitied the long distance the diplomats had to travel, and he told the official in charge to stop the annual paying of tribute. In 632, the envoy arrived in Tsushima with the Tang ambassador, Ko Hyojin. At this time, Ryouun, Min, Suguri no Torikai, and a messenger from Silla were also with them.
