= Japanese missions to Joseon =

Foreign relations with Korea

Japanese missions to Joseon represent a crucial aspect of the international relations of mutual Joseon-Japan contacts and communication. The bilateral exchanges were intermittent.

The unique nature of these bilateral diplomatic exchanges evolved from a conceptual framework developed by the Chinese. Gradually, the theoretical model would be modified. The changing model mirrors the evolution of a unique relationship between two neighboring states.

== Muromachi shogunate missions to Goryeo ==
In 1377 Goryeo envoy Chŏng Mong-ju travelled to Tsukushi in Japan where he met Imagawa Ryōshun; and the consequences of his efforts were only seen later.

== Muromachi shogunate missions to Joseon ==
The Muromachi bakufu's diplomatic contacts and communication with the Joseon court encompassed informal contacts and formal embassies. Muromachi diplomacy also included the more frequent and less formal contacts involving the Japanese daimyo (feudal lord) of Tsushima Island.

In addition, trade missions between merchants of the area were frequent and varied.

Year	Sender	Japanese chief envoy	Joseon monarch	Comments
1403	Ashikaga Yoshimochi	–	Taejo	.
1404	Ashikaga Yoshimitsu	–	Taejong	.
1432	Ashikaga Yoshinori	–	Sejong	.
1447-1448	Ashikaga Yoshinari	Zuikei Shūhō (瑞渓周鳳)	Sejong	Akamatsu Samanosuke (赤松左馬助; 赤松則繁) came back from Korea and plotted an uprising, but he was found guilty and sentenced to death, his head was sent to Kyoto
1456	Ashikaga Yoshimasa	–	Sejo	The shogun Ashikaga Yoshimasa sent a letter to Sejo, the king of Korea.
1474	Ashikaga Yoshihisa	–	Seongjong	The shōgun sent an embassy asking to the emperor of China for a seal.
1499	Ashikaga Yoshizumi	–	Yeonsangun	.

- 1403 – A Japanese diplomatic mission from the Japanese shogun, Ashikaga Yoshimochi, was received in Seoul; and this set in motion the beginnings of a decision-making process about sending a responsive mission to Kyoto.
- 1404 – Former-Shogun Ashikaga Yoshimitsu causes a message to the Joseon king to be sent; and the sender is identified as "king of Japan". The salutation construes the Joseon monarch as the sender's co-equal peer.
- 1422 – Nihonkoku Minamoto Yoshimochi sent the Joseon king a letter in Ōei 29, as time was reckoned using the Japanese calendar system.
- 1423 – Nihonkoku Dosen sent the Joseon king a letter in Ōei 30.
- 1424 – Nihonkoku Dosen sent the Joseon king a letter in Ōei 31.
- 1428 – Nihonkoku Dosen sent the Joseon king a letter in Ōei 35.
- 1432 – Shogun Ashikaga Yoshinori sent an ambassador to the Joseon court.
- 1440 – Nihonkoku Minamoto Yoshinori sent the Joseon king a letter in Ryakuō 3, which the Japanese era at that time.
- 1447 – Nihonkoku ō Minamoto Yoshinari sent the Joseon king a letter in Jōwa 3, which was the Japanese era at that time.
- 1456 – Shogun Ashikaga Yoshimasa caused a letter to be sent to the king of Joseon.
- 1474 – Shogun Ashikaga Yoshihisa sent an ambassador to China, stopping en route at the Joseon court in Seoul. The ambassador's charge was to seek an official seal from the Imperial Chinese court.
- 1499 – Shogun Ashikaga Yoshizumi dispatched an envoy to the Joseon court asking for printing plates for an important Buddhist text; and although the specific request was not fulfilled, the Joseon court did agree to offer printed copies.

== Tokugawa shogunate missions to Joseon ==
In the Edo period of Japanese history, diplomatic missions were construed as benefiting the Japanese as legitimizing propaganda and as a key element in an emerging manifestation of Japan's ideal vision of the structure of an international order with Edo as its center.

== Japanese-Joseon diplomacy adapting ==
Japanese-Joseon bilateral relations were affected by the increasing numbers of international contacts which required adaptation and a new kind of diplomacy.

=== 1876 ===
The Korea-Japan Treaty of 1876 marked the beginning of a new phase in bilateral relations.

== See also ==
- Joseon missions to Japan
- Joseon missions to Imperial China
- Japanese missions to Imperial China
- Korean Empire
- Japanese missions to Paekche
- Japanese missions to Silla
