= Fujiwara no Hirotsugu rebellion =

War in Japan

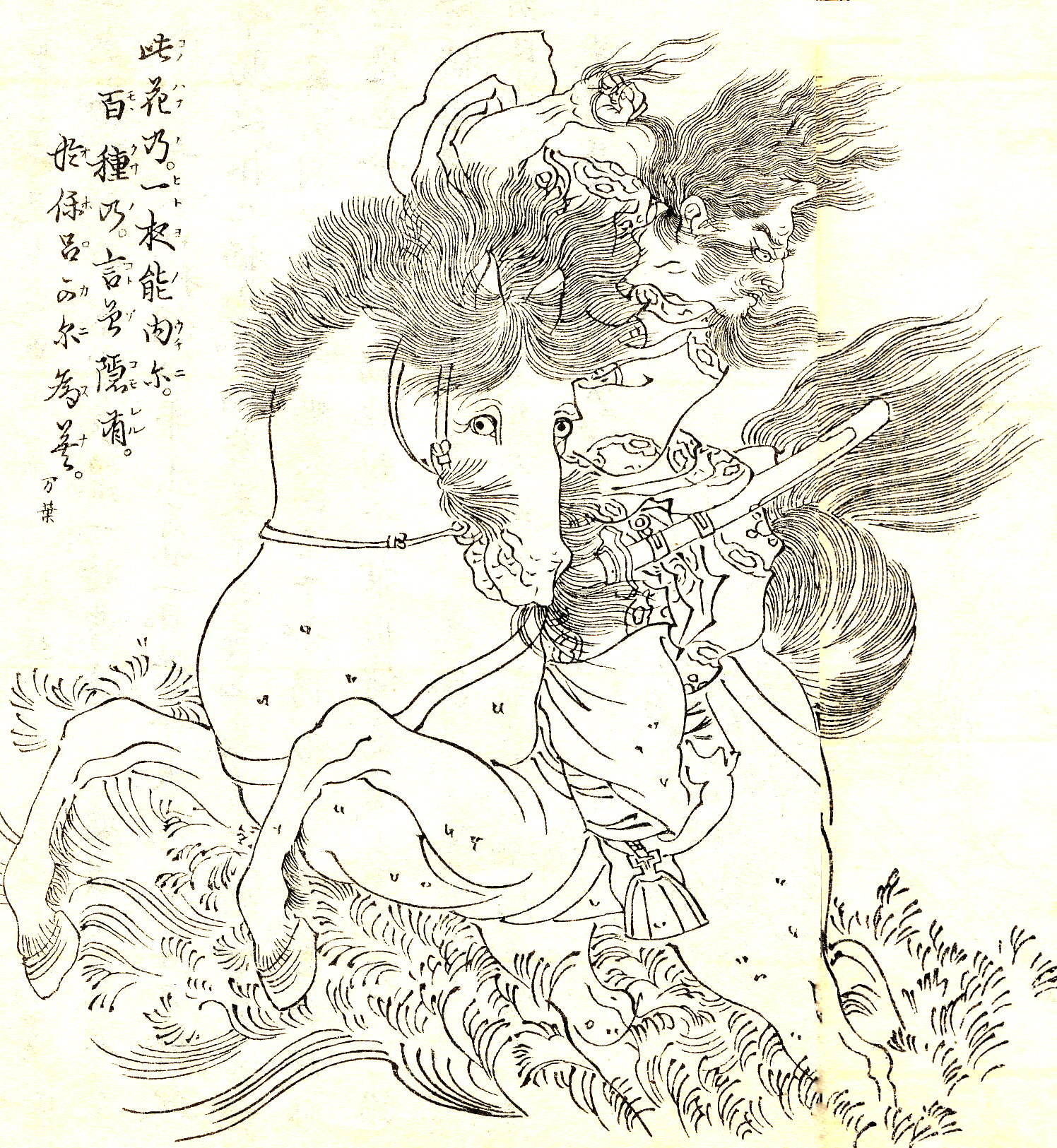
Fujiwara no Hirotsugu in a drawing by Kikuchi Yōsai

The Fujiwara no Hirotsugu rebellion (藤原広嗣の乱, Fujiwara no Hirotsugu no ran) was an unsuccessful Nara period rebellion led by Fujiwara no Hirotsugu (藤原広嗣), first son Fujiwara no Umakai (Founder of Shikike), in the Japanese islands, in the year 740. Hirotsugu, dissatisfied with the political powers, raised an army in Dazaifu, Kyushu but was defeated by government forces.

== Historical source ==
The Fujiwara no Hirotsugu Rebellion is sparsely documented and most of what is known about it, including exact dates, derives from a single historical source, the Shoku Nihongi. Completed in 797, this is one of the imperially commissioned Six National Histories and covers the time from 697 to 791. It is a valuable document for historians, though not all dates in it should be considered exact.

== Background ==
The Fujiwara clan had influenced Japanese politics since its founder, Nakatomi no Kamatari, assisted in a coup d'état in 645, in which the Soga clan was overthrown and shortly thereafter a reform program (Taika Reform) was launched, aimed at reinforcing imperial authority. In the 730s, the imperial advisory body known as the Council of State (Daijō-kan) was controlled by four sons of Fujiwara no Fuhito known as the "Fujiwara Four": Fujiwara no Muchimaro, minister of the right since 729; Fujiwara no Fusasaki, consultant since 729; Fujiwara no Umakai and Fujiwara no Maro who joined the council in 731. Together they held four out of ten positions of this important council which was placed directly under the emperor and in charge of all kinds of secular affairs. (Note: A second council, known as "Council of Kami Affairs" (Jingi-kan) had roughly equal status and was charged with oversight of Shinto clergy and rituals.) In addition, the Fujiwara were related with the emperor as both Shōmu's mother and his consort Empress Kōmyō, were daughters of Fujiwara no Fuhito.

In 735 a devastating smallpox epidemic, which eventually killed about one third of the Japanese population, broke out on Kyushu and subsequently spread north-east. While most victims were from the producer populace of western and central Japan, by 737, the epidemic reached the capital at Heijō-kyō (Nara) causing death and terror among the aristocracy. Emperor Shōmu was spared, but by the 8th month of 737 ten officials of fourth rank or higher were dead, including the "Fujiwara Four". The death of their top figures and heads of the four Fujiwara branches considerably weakened the influence of the Fujiwara clan.

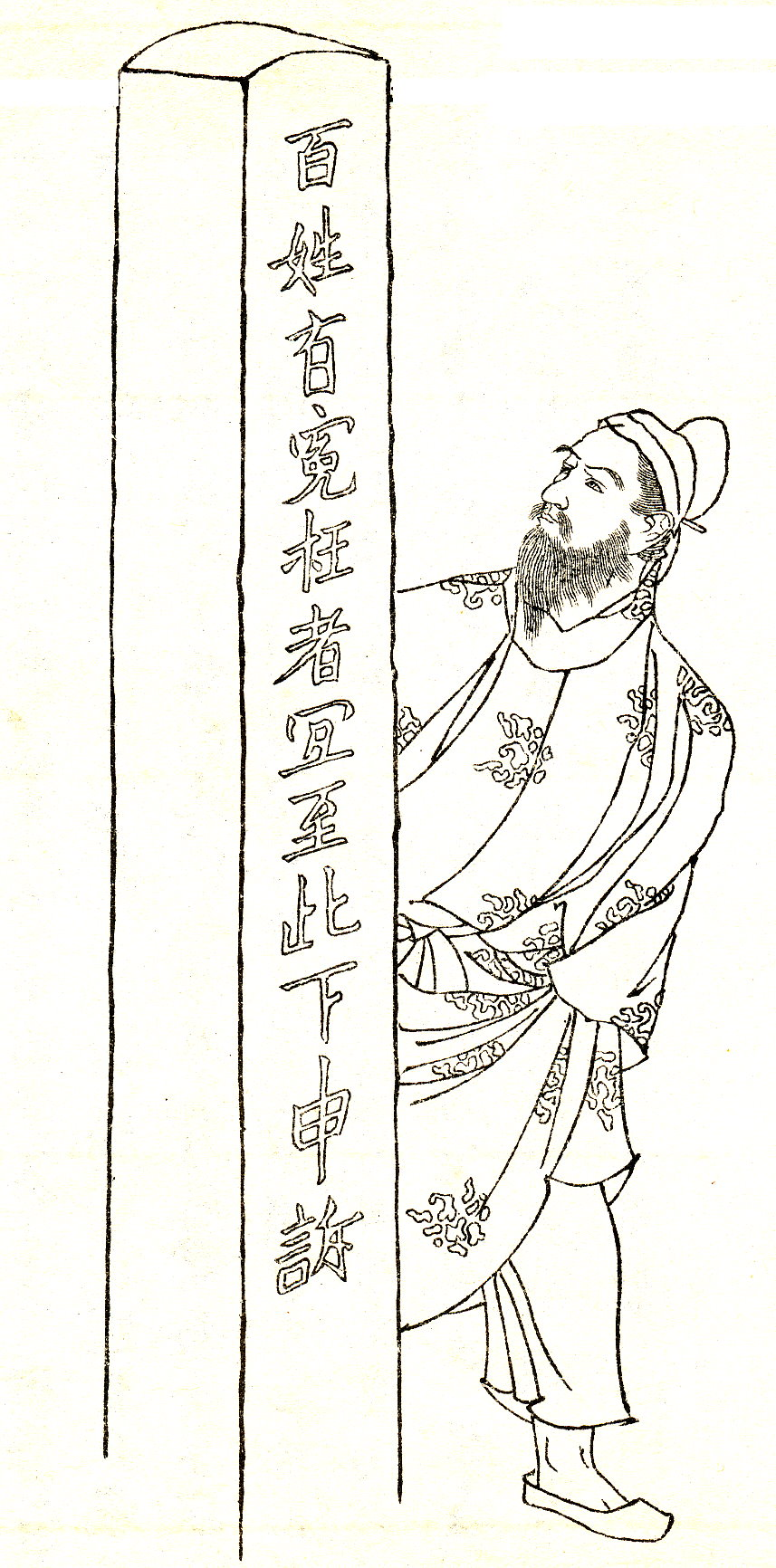
Kibi no Makibi

The following appointments brought about a shift in power towards nobles closely related to the emperor and away from non-imperial clans such as the Fujiwara. In 737 Prince Suzuka, brother of Prince Nagaya, (Note: The Fujiwara Four had assisted in driving Prince Nagaya to suicide before.) was appointed to Chancellor (Daijō-daijin), the highest position of the Council of State. In the beginning of the following year, (Note: Tenpyō 10 1st month (January/February, 738): Tachibana no Moroe becomes Minister of the Right) Tachibana no Moroe, half-brother of Empress Kōmyō, took the position of minister of the right that had been held by Muchimaro before his death. The only Fujiwara in the council at the time was Muchimaro's son, Fujiwara no Toyonari who had a relatively low rank. In addition, all the clans that had opposed the Fujiwara Four such as the Ōtomo, the Saeki or the Agata Inukai were Moroe backers. Unlike under the Fujiwara Four, the Emperor was not opposed by a single strong faction anymore as members of this new council originated from various clans.

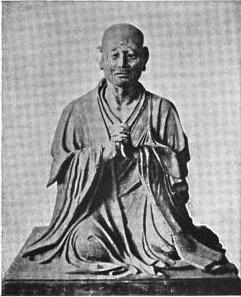
Genbō

Kibi no Makibi and Genbō were promoted to important posts, despite lacking prestigious family backgrounds. Both had spent 17 years in Tang China and returned to Japan in 735. Makibi who had brought several important Confucian texts to Japan would advise the Emperor on the latest continental developments in legal codes, warfare and music. He was promoted to a higher rank and became Imperial professor (daigaku no suke) at court. In 736, 2nd month (March/April), the monk Genbō who had returned with more than 5000 Buddhist scrolls and commentaries was given a large plot of land, eight servants and a purple kesa by the court. When the plague reached the court in 737, he was asked to perform healing rituals for the imperial family; and his activities were thought to actually heal the Emperor's mother, Fujiwara no Miyako. (Note: Since the text in classical Japanese in the Shoku Nihongi is somewhat ambiguous and contradictory, historians mistakenly believed that Genbō had seduced Empress Kōmyō or the wife of Fujiwara no Hirotsugu.) Consequently, his influence at court increased and in 737, 8th month (August/September) Genbō became chief priest of Kōfuku-ji, head of the northern branch of the Hossō sect of Buddhism, and he gained the highest monastic rank sōjō (primary prelate).

Several Fujiwara were exiled to posts in distant provinces. Fujiwara no Hirotsugu, the oldest son of Umakai and nephew of Empress Kōmyō, was the leader of the Shikike branch of the Fujiwara family. Hermann Bohner describes him as a "knight", very talented in warfare, dance, music, poetry and science, but also as daredevil who is looking for enemies to attack and for risks to take. Seeing the Fujiwara influence waning, Hirotsugu impeached Genbō and vocally opposed Makibi. However Shōmu confided in his most influential advisors and had Hirotsugu demoted from his position as governor of the central Yamato Province, which he had assumed a year earlier, to remote Kyushu where he became vice-governor of Dazaifu in 738.

== Rebellion ==
In a memorial sent to the Emperor in September 740, (Note: Tenpyō 12 8th month, 29th day (24 September, 740): Hirotsugu demands dismissal of Kibi no Makibi and Genbō) Hirotsugu declared that he held Kibi no Makibi and the priest Genbō responsible for corruption and general discontent at the capital. He pointed out "failures of recent policy, described catastrophes of heaven and earth" and demanded their dismissal. Four days after the court received his message, (Note: Tenpyō 12 9th month, 3rd day (28 September, 740): Hirotsugu starts rebellion) he declared himself in rebellion not unlike what Iwai did some 200 years before. At the time the people on Kyushu were experiencing hard times after the smallpox epidemics, years of drought and bad harvest. The government had responded to this situation with a large scale temple building project aimed at appeasing the gods. However farmer families could not afford the imposed corvée on temple construction. Hirotsugu's cause was supported by discontented farmers, local district chiefs and members of the Hayato minority of southern Kyushu; he also tried to secure support from the Korean kingdom of Silla. Making use of his official position at Dazaifu, Hirotsugu soon had an army of about 10,000 to 15,000 men (Note: This number varies widely in literature with some sources giving 10,000 and others 12,000 to 15,000.) assembled.

Map showing major events of the rebellion

With the force concentrated in vital Dazaifu and Hirotsugu's connections in the capital, this situation posed a serious threat to the central government. Shōmu, who also might have been worried about a possible involvement of Silla, responded by assigning Ono no Azumabito as general over a suppression army of 17,000 men taken from eastern and western Japan except for Kyushu — the largest royal army of the 8th century. As draftees had been released a year before due to the epidemics, it took another month before they could be mustered. On 29 September (Note: Tenpyō 12 9th month, 4th day (29 September, 740): Government dispatches Hayato reconnaissance team) the government sends a reconnaissance team of 24 native Hayato. Forces on either side consisted of both infantry and mounted soldiers and were under local command of district magistrates. According to William Wayne Farris, in 8th century Japan, the horsemen played a decisive role in the strength of an army. Before any battle, in this conflict, a large part of the government troops would be recruited from western Honshu where many good mounted archers were located, giving them a decisive advantage over Hirotsugu who was limited to Kyushu. Later in the conflict, some of Hirotsugu's mounted soldiers would defect, augmenting this advantage.

To secure spiritual support for the mission, Azumabito was ordered to pray to Hachiman, the god of war. This was one of the first crises in which people resorted to Hachiman as a kami of power. A messenger was sent to make offerings at the Ise Grand Shrine and Shōmu ordered that seven-foot-high statues of Kannon bosatsu be cast and sutras copied and read in all provinces.

In order to surround the government forces, Hirotsugu split his army into three units; one under his command and the others under command of his subordinates, Tsunade and Komaro respectively. Together they advanced along different routes to northern Kyushu where the Kanmon Straits separate Kyushu from Japan's main island, Honshu. Along the way, on 19 October, (Note: Tenpyō 12 9th month, 24th day (19 October, 740): Hirotsugu stops at Oka district headquarters) Hirotsugu stopped at the headquarters of Oka district to "make camp, set up his crossbows, raise beacon signals, and conscript soldiers from the province [of Chikuzen]". Eventually he arrived at fortifications (chinsho) in Miyako district, Buzen Province near the expected invasion route. But Hirotsugu's plans for an organized attack were foiled as one army of several thousand men did not appear and another unit was late. The government army successfully landed on Kyushu, captured men and weapons from three camps at Tomi, Itabitsu and Miyako in Buzen Province. (Note: Tenpyō 12 9th month, 24th day (19 October, 740): Government forces occupy three camps) Earlier the court's army had been reinforced on 16/17 October (Note: Tenpyō 12 9th month, 21st/22nd day (16/17 October, 740): Reinforcement of government army in Nagato Province) with more than 4,000 men including 40 fine soldiers (jōhei) under the magistrate of Toyoura District, Nagato Province. On 20 October, (Note: Tenpyō 12 9th month, 25th day (20 October, 740): Some of Hirotsugu's allies defect) several of Hirotsugu's allies surrendered and changed sides: four district officials defected together with 500 mounted warriors and a citizen from Buzen Province killed one of the rebels. Later, a magistrate from a Buzen district returned with several rebels' heads from battle. On 24 October, (Note: Tenpyō 12 9th month, 29th day (24 October, 740): Emperor sends decree to discredit Hirotsugu) an imperial decree was distributed among the population and officials of Kyushu, trying to discredit Hirotsugu, and promising rewards to anybody who killed Hirotsugu. (Note: The traitor Hirotsugu was a wicked youth and came to do more and more evil as he grew up. His late father, the minister of ceremonial, wanted to disinherit him, but we intervened. However, when he slandered his family, we sent him away and were awaiting his reform. Now it comes to our ears that he has begun a ridiculous rebellion, causing suffering among the people. Because of his extreme disloyalty and lack of filial piety, the gods of heaven and earth will surely bring his destruction in a matter of days. Although we sent the above message to the provinces of Kyushu several days ago, it has come to our ears that the traitor captured the man assigned to distribute it and prevented him from informing the people. This time we have made several hundred copies of the message and have distributed them everywhere, so such interference will be impossible. Let all who see this rescript immediately return allegiance to the throne. Whoever slays Hirotsugu will be promoted to fifth rank and given other rewards, even if he is one of the rebels, and even if he is not currently a member of the official class. If by any chance the man who does the deed is himself killed, we promise the reward to his descendants. Come forth now, loyal subjects and faithful retainers. Our imperial army is advancing on Kyushu. [Shoku Nihongi 12/9/29])

On November 2, (Note: Tenpyō 12 10th month, 9th day (2 November, 740): Battle at Itabitsu river) the remaining army of Hirotsugu, said to consist of 10,000 horsemen, met the government forces at Itabitsu river. As they failed to cross, Hirotsugu's army was defeated and broke up. Trying to reach Silla by boat, Hirotsugu was forced back by storms, captured by government forces under Abe no Kuromaro (安倍黒麻呂) on November 16 on Chikanoshima in the Gotō Islands, Hizen Province. (Note: Tenpyō 12 10th month, 23rd day (16 November, 740): Hirotsugu captured) A week later, on November 24, a general beheaded him without the court's permission.

== Emperor Shōmu's tour to the eastern provinces ==
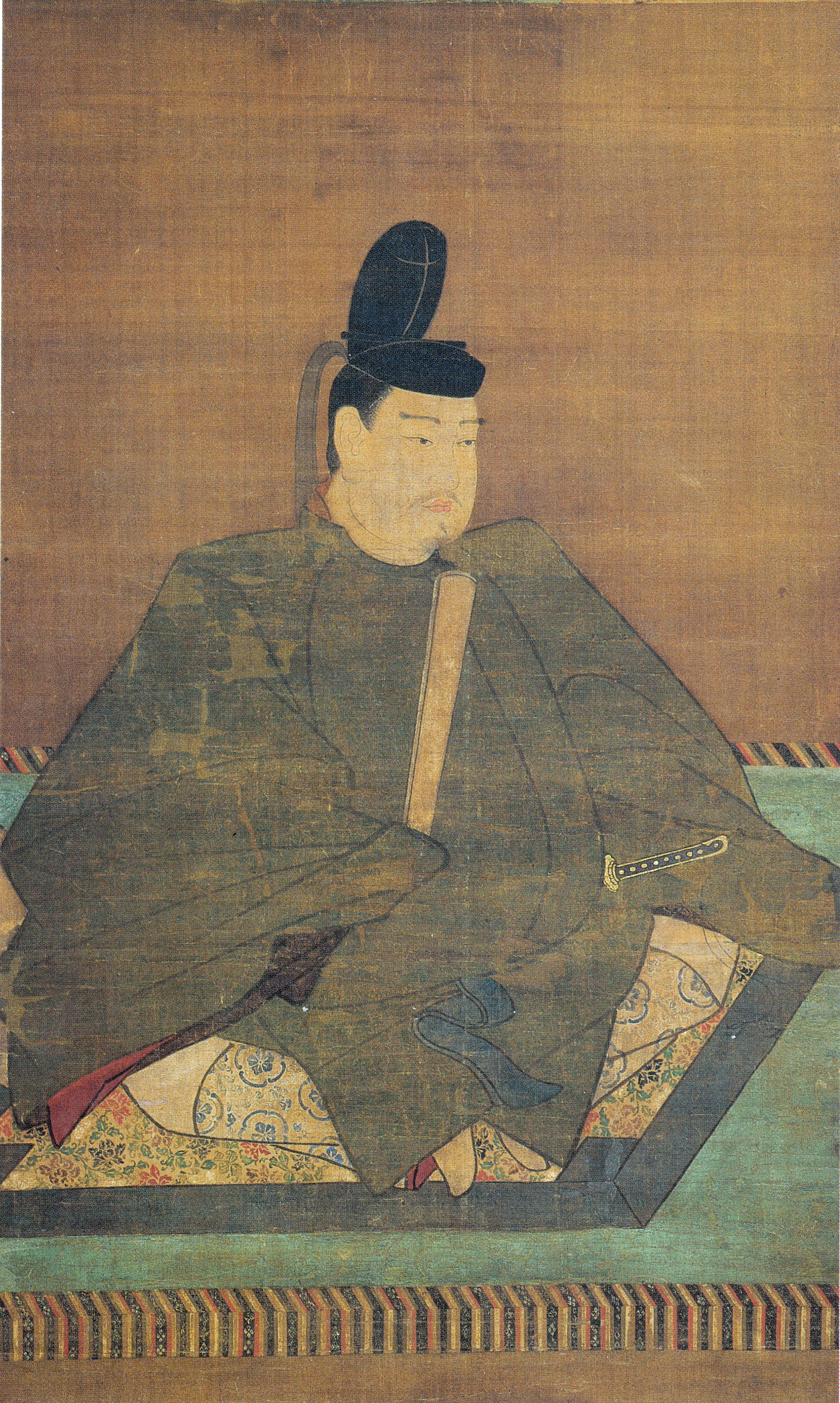
Emperor Shōmu

While battle maneuvers were still underway, in the 10th month, (Note: Tenpyō 12 10th month (November, 740): Emperor Shōmu leaves the capital) Emperor Shōmu left the capital at Heijō-kyō (Nara) and traveled eastward via Horikoshi (Note: temporary lodging built to accommodate an Imperial visit) (堀越頓宮; today Tsuge; 10th month, 29th day: November 22), Nabari (10th month, 30th day: November 23), Ao (安保頓宮; today Aoyama; 11th month 1st day: November 24) to Kawaguchi in Ichishi District, Ise Province (today part of Tsu, formerly part of Hakusan) where he retreated together with his court to a temporary palace. One of his generals was left in command of the capital. Presumably Shōmu feared Fujiwara supporters in Nara and was hoping to quell potential uprisings in other parts of the country with his presence. After four days travelling through heavy rain and thick mud, the party reached Kawaguchi on November 25. (Note: Tenpyō 12 11th month, 2nd day (25 November, 740): Emperor Shōmu reaches Kawaguchi) A couple of days later, they learn of Hirotsugu's execution and that the rebellion had been quelled.

Despite the good news, Shōmu did not return to Heijō-kyō immediately, but stayed in Kawaguchi until December 4. (Note: Tenpyō 12 11th month, 11th day (4 December 740): Emperor Shōmu leaves Kawaguchi) He continued his journey east, then north via Mino Province and back west along the shores of Lake Biwa to Kuni in Yamashiro Province (today in Kizugawa) which he reached on January 6, 741. (Note: Tenpyō 12 12th month, 15th day (6 January, 741): Emperor Shōmu reaches Kuni) Places passed along the way included Akasaka 赤坂頓宮; today Suzuka; 11th m. 14th d.: Dec 7), Asake district (朝明郡; today Yokkaichi; 11th m. 20th d.: Dec 13), Ishiura (石占頓宮; today Tado; 11th m. 25th d.: Dec 18), Tagi district (当伎郡; today Yōrō; 11th m. 26th d.: Dec 19), Fuwa (不破頓宮; today Tarui; 12th m. 1st d.: Dec 23), Yokokawa (横川頓宮; today Santō or Maihara; 12th m. 6th d.: Dec 28), Inukami (犬上頓宮; today Hikone; 12th m. 7th d.: Dec 29), Gamō district (蒲生郡; today near Yōkaichi; 12th m. 9th d.: Dec 31), Yasu (野洲頓宮; today Yasu or Moriyama; 12th m. 10th d.: Jan 1), Awazu (禾津頓宮; today Ōtsu; 12th m. 11th d.: Jan 2), Tamanoi (玉井頓宮; today Yamashina-ku, Kyoto; 12th m. 14th d.). Situated among the hills and near a river north of Nara, Kuni was easily defensible. In addition, the area was linked with the Minister of the Right, Tachibana no Moroe, while Nara was a center of the Fujiwara clan. On January 6, 741, (Note: Tenpyō 12 12th month, 15 day (6 January, 741): new capital at Kuni-kyō) Shōmu proclaimed a new capital at Kuni-kyō.

== Aftermath ==
In an entry of the Shoku Nihongi, dated April 14, 741, (Note: Tenpyō 13 3rd month, 24th day (14 April, 741): gifts to the Hachiman shrine) it was noted that gifts of land, servants, horses and Buddhist sutras were made to the Hachiman shrine and for the construction of a pagoda. Bender considers these offerings to be in thanks for the suppression of Hirotsugu's rebellion. While not directly related to the rebellion, Shōmu's edict of 741, in which he decreed that provincial temples be established, is another indication for the desolate state of the country following a number of calamities.

The death of Fujiwara no Hirotsugu marked the end of the Shikike branch and the start of the rise of the Nanke, "southern", Fujiwara. Having suppressed the rebellion, Moroe's influence at court grew further. However, through the influence of the Fujiwara, Makibi and Genbō were removed from court and exiled to Kyushu, the place from where Hirotsugu had demanded the removal of Genbō and shortly thereafter started his rebellion. Genbō built the temple Kwannon-ji in 745 and Makibi became governor of Chikuzen Province in 759 and shortly thereafter of Hizen Province before he was sent to China. Genbō died a year later in 746 and popular belief held Hirotsugu's ghost — acting in rancor — was responsible for the death of the monk. This story was noted in the Shoku Nihongi as: "Word spread that the spiritual effect of Fujiwara no Hirotsugu had caused him harm", and it is the first mention of a vengeful spirit (goryō) in Japanese history or literature. Herman Ooms sees in this rumor a "widespread support (probably limited to Nara and environs) for someone who critiqued the government (Hirotsugu) and suffered the consequences".

In the second half of the 8th century Hirotsugu's spirit was, together with that of Prince Nagaya, considered particularly disruptive. At a time of a countrywide tuberculosis epidemic, thought to be caused by goryō, Fujiwara no Mototsune, of the "northern" (hokke) Fujiwara branch, held a goryō'e (departed spirits ritual) on June 10, 863 (Note: Jōgan 5 5th month, 20th day (10 June, 863): goryō'e organized by Fujiwara no Mototsune) at the Imperial Palace Gardens in Heian-kyō (Kyoto). This ritual was aimed at six spirits, including Fujiwara no Hirotsugu's, as each of them had become a departed spirit due to Fujiwara actions. McMullin therefore assumes that the event was held in order to direct the fear in the population to these six deceased people who had been enemies of the hokke branch of the Fujiwara family, sending the message that enemies of the hokke Fujiwara were enemies of the people.

== See also ==
- List of Japanese battles
