= Ōno no Azumabito =

Japanese samurai

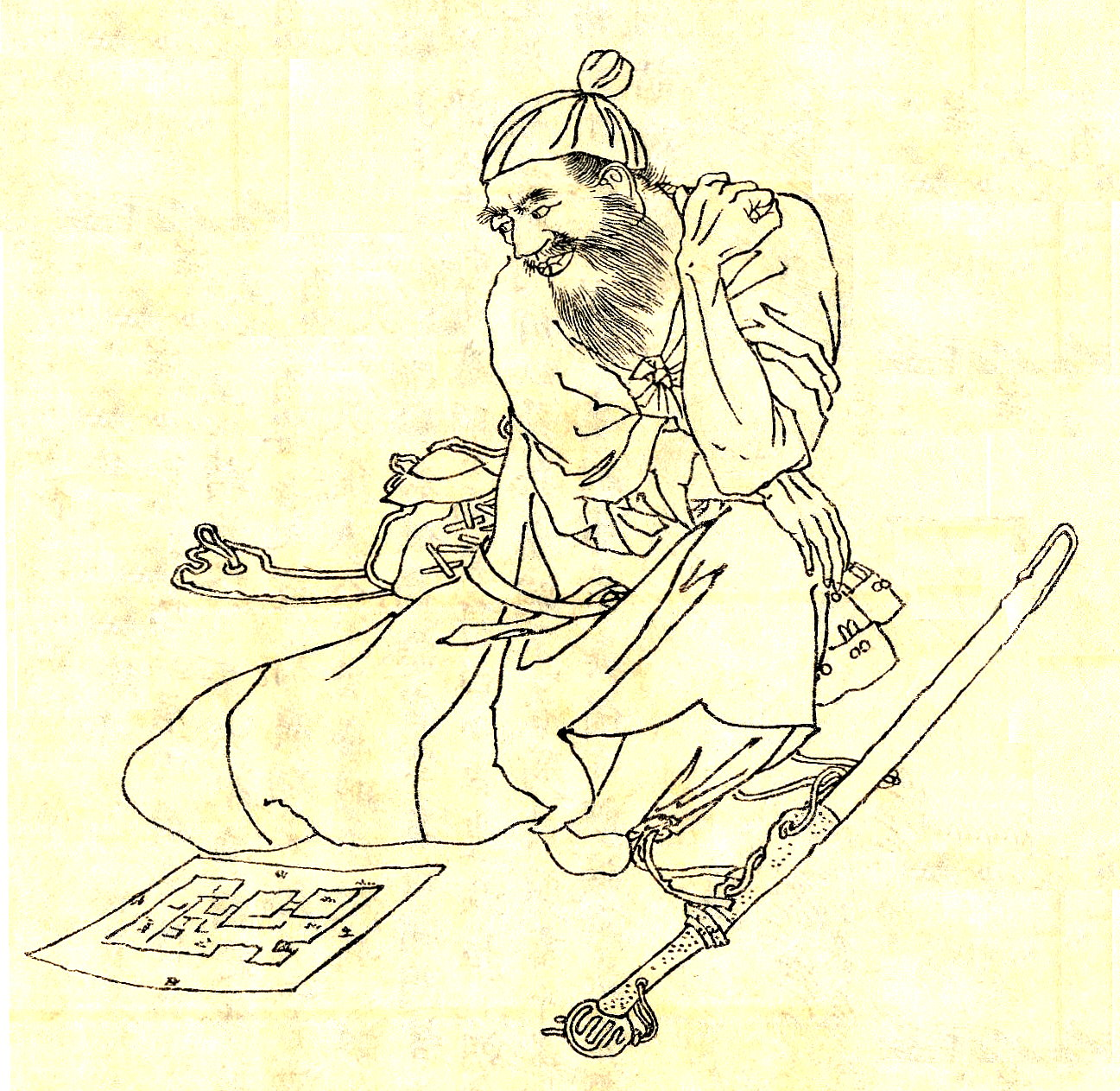
- An illustration of Ōno no Azumabito from a 1909 book.
- Died: 7 December 742
- Era: Nara

Ōno no Azumabito (大野 東人; died 7 December 742) was a samurai and court official of Japan's Nara period. He was the son of Ōno no Hatayasu (大野 果安)..

In 724, he fought alongside Fujiwara no Umakai against the Emishi people of Mutsu Province. Azumabito was later appointed to the Imperial positions of chinjufu-shōgun (Commander-in-chief of the Defense of the North) and Azechi (Inspector). He also aided in the suppression of the 740 revolt of Fujiwara no Hirotsugu (the Dazai shoni of the Dazaifu on Kyushu). The rebellion ended with Fujiwara's defeat and death.
