= Kibi no Makibi =

Japanese scholar (695–775)

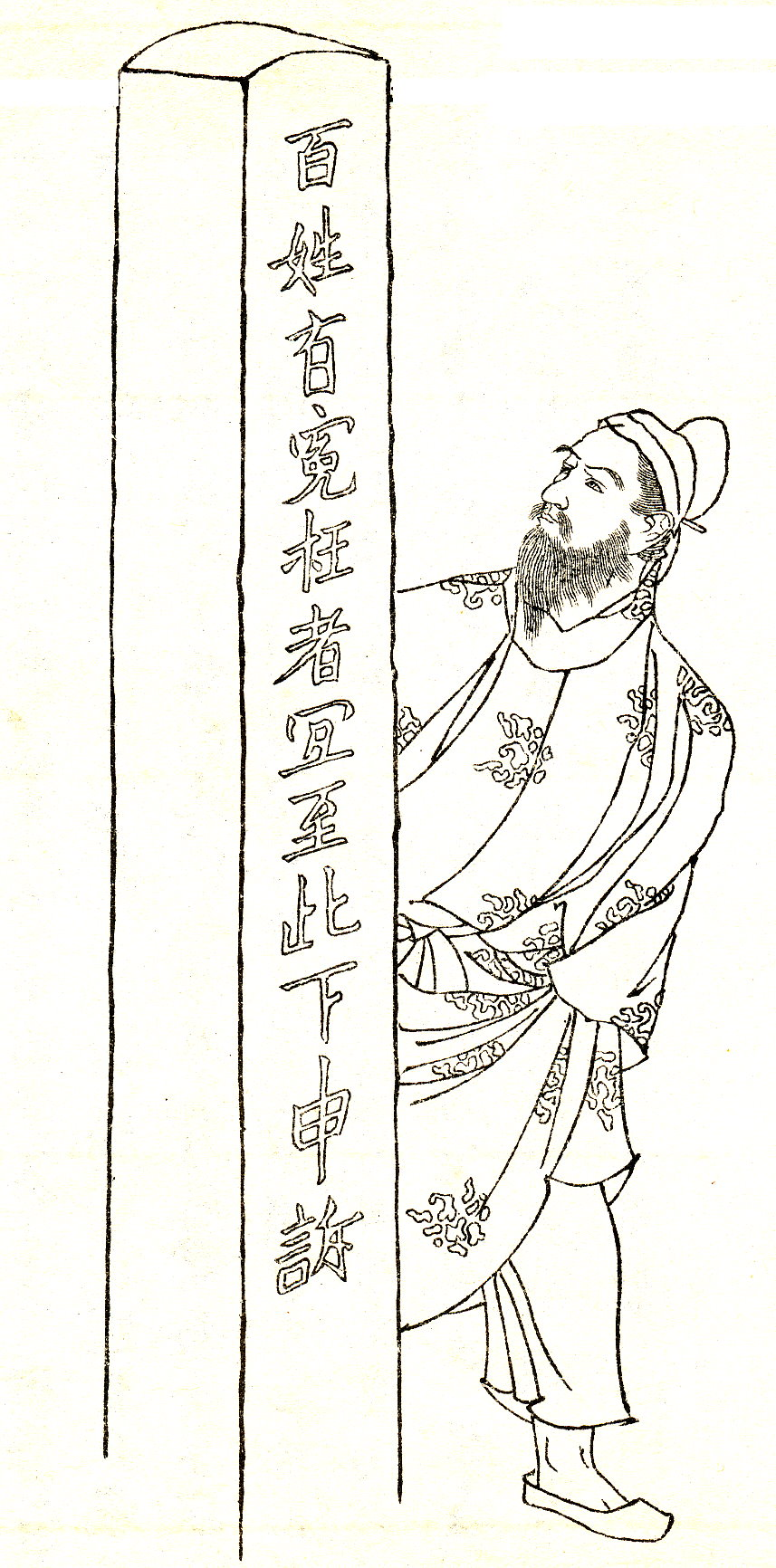
Kibi no Makibi in a book illustration by Kikuchi Yōsai

Kibi no Asomi Makibi (吉備 朝臣 真備; 695 – November 3, 775) was a Japanese scholar and noble during the Nara period. Also known as Minister Kibi (吉備大臣, Kibi Daijin).

== Early life ==
Kibi no Makibi was born in Shimotsumichi County, Bitchu Province (present-day Kurashiki, Okayama Prefecture) as Shimotsumichi-no Asomi Makibi, as a son of Shimotsumichi-no Asomi Kunikatsu. Shimotsumichi clan was a line of local elites and came from the greater Kibi clan. Kibi was also the ancient name of the area he came from (Kibi Province), which encompassed Bitchu, Bizen, Bingo and Mimasaka Provinces.

== Career ==
In 717-718, Kibi was part of the Japanese mission to Tang China (Kentōshi) with Abe no Nakamaro and Genbō. Kibi stayed in China for 17 years before returning to Japan. He is credited with bringing back a number of things, introducing to Japan the game of go and the art of embroidery.

In 737, he received promotion to the junior fifth rank. His influence at court triggered the Fujiwara no Hirotsugu Rebellion of 740. In 751, at the senior fourth rank (upper grade), he received an appointment as vice-ambassador to the Tang dynasty and traveled to China the following year, returning to Japan in 753.

Kibi spent some years in Kyūshū as the assistant administrator of Dazaifu (the principal governmental post on the island); he returned to Nara.

In 764, he was made head of the project to construct Tōdai-ji. Promotion to the junior third rank followed.

He was appointed to head an army to put down the uprising by Fujiwara no Nakamaro. Reaching the second rank in 765, he took the offices of Major Councillor, then Minister of the Right. In 770, he supported a losing candidate for the throne and submitted his resignation from office. The court accepted only his resignation from military office and retained him as Minister of the Right. He finally resigned in 771, devoting himself to the study of Confucian principles and their applications in Japanese administration. Kibi died in 775 at the age of 80.

Kibi has sometimes been credited with inventing the katakana phonetic syllabary and writing system.

The Kibi Daijin Nittō Emaki, a12th century narrative handscroll in the collection of the Museum of Fine Arts, Boston depicting Kibi's journey to China is one of the earliest of all Japanese narrative pictorial handscrolls (e-maki) known. It is believed to have been commissioned to help support the prestige of a school of divination that claimed connections to Kibi. Its purchase by the museum in 1932 directly led to the strengthening of Japanese laws against the removal of cultural properties of particular importance from the country.

== See also ==
- Japanese missions to Imperial China
- Japanese missions to Tang China
