= List of Japanese court ranks, positions and hereditary titles =

The court ranks of Japan, also known in Japanese as ikai (位階), are indications of an individual's court rank in Japan based on the system of the state. Ikai as a system was the indication of the rank of bureaucrats and officials in countries that inherited (class system).

Currently, the Japanese court ranks and titles are among the types of honours conferred to those who have held government posts for a long time and to those who have made distinguished achievements. In recent times, most appointments, if not all, are offered posthumously. A notable recipient of such a court rank is the late former prime minister Shinzo Abe, who received Junior First Rank (従一位, ju ichi-i) on 8 July 2022.

== Court ranks ==
The national system for ranking politicians and officials who served the Japanese dynasty began in 603 when Empress Suiko enacted the Twelve Level Cap and Rank System. Each rank was identified by the color of a crown the person with the rank wore. There were twelve ranks: Greater Virtue (大徳, dai-toku), Lesser Virtue (小徳, shō-toku), Greater Benevolence (大仁, dai-jin), Lesser Benevolence (小仁, shō-jin), Greater Propriety (大礼, dai-rei), Lesser Propriety (小礼, shō-rei), Greater Sincerity (大信, dai-shin), Lesser Sincerity (小信, shō-shin), Greater Justice (大義, dai-gi), Lesser Justice (小義, shō-gi), Greater Knowledge (大智, dai-chi), and Lesser Knowledge (小智, shō-chi), from top to bottom.

The ranking system underwent several amendments and was developed by the Taiho Code enacted in 701. Under this system, ranks were established for the Imperial family members and vassals like the following:

=== Ranks for Imperial family members ===
An Emperor was not ranked.

Princes, princesses, and other Imperial family members were ranked depending on the extent of their contribution to the nation or other factors as follows:

English translation	Japanese text	Romanized Japanese	Notes
First Rank	一品	ip-pon	
Second Rank	二品	ni-hon	
Third Rank	三品	san-bon	
Fourth Rank	四品	shi-hon	

=== Ranks for subjects ===
Under the Taiho Code, politicians and officials other than Imperial family members were graded according to the following ranking system.

==== First to Third Ranks ====
Each of the First to Third Ranks is divided into Senior (正, shō) and Junior (従, ju). The Senior First Rank (正一位, shō ichi-i) is the highest in the rank system. It is conferred mainly on a very limited number of persons recognized by the Imperial Court as most loyal to the nation during that era.

The Junior First Rank (従一位, ju ichi-i) is the second highest rank, conferred in many cases on the highest ministers, premier feudal lords, and their wives.

Nobles with the Third Rank or upper were called kugyō.

Successive Tokugawa shoguns held the highest or near-highest court ranks, higher than most court nobles. They were made Shō ni-i (正二位, Senior Second Rank) of court rank upon assuming office, then Ju ichi-i (従一位, Junior First Rank), and the highest rank of Shō ichi-i (正一位, Senior First Rank) was conferred upon them upon their death. The Tokugawa shogunate established that the court ranks granted to daimyo by the imperial court were based on the recommendation of the Tokugawa shogunate, and the court ranks were used to control the daimyo.

Oda Nobunaga and Toyotomi Hideyoshi were Shō ni-i (正二位, Senior Second Rank) and Ju ichi-i (従一位, Junior First Rank) respectively, but both were elevated to Shō ichi-i (正一位, Senior First Rank) in the Taisho era, about 300 years after their deaths.

English translation	Japanese text	Romanized Japanese	Selected recipients
Senior First Rank	正一位	shō ichi-i	Fujiwara no Fuhito (720), Sugawara no Michizane (993), Tokugawa Ieyasu (1617), Lady Saigō (1628), Tokugawa Hidetada (1632), Tokugawa Iemitsu (1651)
Junior First Rank	従一位	ju ichi-i	Isonokami no Maro (717), Taira no Kiyomori (1167), Ashikaga Takauji (1358), Ōmandokoro (1585), Nene (1588), Maeda Toshiie (1599), Oeyo (1626), Takatsukasa Nobuko (wife of shōgun Tokugawa Tsunayoshi) (1702), Keisho-in (mother of shōgun Tokugawa Tsunayoshi) (1702), Iso no Miya Tomoko (wife of shōgun Tokugawa Ieharu (1783), Shimazu no Shigehime (wife of Tokugawa Ienari) (1792)
Senior Second Rank	正二位	shō ni-i	Minamoto no Yoritomo (1189), Toyotomi Hideyori (1602), Konoe Tadahiro (1824)
Junior Second Rank	従二位	ju ni-i	Taira no Tokiko (1166), Hōjō Masako (1218), Toyotomi Hidenaga (1587), Tokugawa Muneharu (1839), Lady Kasuga (1628)
Senior Third Rank	正三位	shō san-mi	Fujiwara no Matate (764), Takano no Niigasa (781), Kitabatake Tomonori (1557)
Junior Third Rank	従三位	ju san-mi	Asa no Miya Akiko (1658), Tenshō-in (1858)

==== Fourth Rank ====
The Fourth Rank is divided into Senior and Junior, and each is subdivided into Upper (上, jō) and Lower (下, ge) Grades. The Senior Fourth Rank, Upper Grade (正四位上, shō shi-i no jō) is the highest Fourth Rank and the Junior Fourth Rank, Lower Grade (従四位下, ju shi-i no ge) the lowest.

English translation	Japanese text	Romanized Japanese	Notes
Senior Fourth Rank, Upper Grade	正四位上	shō shi-i no jō	
Senior Fourth Rank, Lower Grade	正四位下	shō shi-i no ge	Matsunaga Hisahide (1561)
Junior Fourth Rank, Upper Grade	従四位上	ju shi-i no jō	
Junior Fourth Rank, Lower Grade	従四位下	ju shi-i no ge	Taira no Tadamori

==== Fifth Rank ====
The Fifth Rank is divided into Senior and Junior, and each is subdivided into Upper and Lower Grades. The Senior Fifth Rank, Upper Grade (正五位上, shō go-i no jō) is the highest Fifth Rank and the Junior Fifth Rank, Lower Grade (従五位下, ju go-i no ge) the lowest.

English translation	Japanese text	Romanized Japanese	Notes
Senior Fifth Rank, Upper Grade	正五位上	shō go-i no jō	
Senior Fifth Rank, Lower Grade	正五位下	shō go-i no ge	Kusunoki Masashige
Junior Fifth Rank, Upper Grade	従五位上	ju go-i no jō	Sanada Nobuyuki (1591), Yamakawa Futaba, Sakamoto Tenzan
Junior Fifth Rank, Lower Grade	従五位下	ju go-i no ge	Hojo Ujinao (1575), Hayashi Narinaga (1588)

==== Sixth Rank ====
The Sixth Rank is divided into Senior and Junior, and each is subdivided into Upper and Lower Grades. The Senior Sixth Rank, Upper Grade (正六位上, shō roku-i no jō) is the highest Sixth Rank and the Junior Sixth Rank, Lower Grade (従六位下, ju roku-i no ge) the lowest.

English translation	Japanese text	Romanized Japanese	Notes
Senior Sixth Rank, Upper Grade	正六位上	shō roku-i no jō	
Senior Sixth Rank, Lower Grade	正六位下	shō roku-i no ge	
Junior Sixth Rank, Upper Grade	従六位上	ju roku-i no jō	
Junior Sixth Rank, Lower Grade	従六位下	ju roku-i no ge	

==== Seventh Rank ====
The Seventh Rank is divided into Senior and Junior, and each is subdivided into Upper and Lower Grades. The Senior Seventh Rank, Upper Grade (正七位上, shō shichi-i no jō) is the highest Seventh Rank and the Junior Seventh Rank, Lower Grade (従七位下, ju shichi-i no ge) the lowest.

English translation	Japanese text	Romanized Japanese	Notes
Senior Seventh Rank, Upper Grade	正七位上	shō shichi-i no jō	
Senior Seventh Rank, Lower Grade	正七位下	shō shichi-i no ge	
Junior Seventh Rank, Upper Grade	従七位上	ju shichi-i no jō	
Junior Seventh Rank, Lower Grade	従七位下	ju shichi-i no ge	

==== Eighth Rank ====
The Eighth Rank is divided into Senior and Junior, subdivided into Upper and Lower Grades. The Senior Eighth Rank, Upper Grade (正八位上, shō hachi-i no jō), is the highest, and the Junior Eighth Rank, Lower Grade (従八位下, ju hachi-i no ge), is the lowest.

English translation	Japanese text	Romanized Japanese	Notes
Senior Eighth Rank, Upper Grade	正八位上	shō hachi-i no jō	
Senior Eighth Rank, Lower Grade	正八位下	shō hachi-i no ge	
Junior Eighth Rank, Upper Grade	従八位上	ju hachi-i no jō	
Junior Eighth Rank, Lower Grade	従八位下	ju hachi-i no ge	

==== Initial Rank ====
The Initial Rank (初位, sho-i) is divided into Greater (大, dai) and Lesser (少, shō), and each is subdivided into Upper and Lower Grades. The Greater Initial Rank, Upper Grade (大初位上, dai sho-i no jō) is the highest Initial Rank, and the Lesser Initial Rank, Lower Grade (少初位下, shō sho-i no ge) the lowest.

English translation	Japanese text	Romanized Japanese	Notes
Greater Initial Rank, Upper Grade	大初位上	dai sho-i no jō	
Greater Initial Rank, Lower Grade	大初位下	dai sho-i no ge	
Lesser Initial Rank, Upper Grade	少初位上	shō sho-i no jō	
Lesser Initial Rank, Lower Grade	少初位下	shō sho-i no ge	

=== Ranking system after the Meiji Restoration ===
The 1887 Ordinance on Ordination reorganized the ranking system. It abolished the Initial Ranks and the Grades of Upper and Lower of Fourth and lower Ranks. The relationships between ikai and court positions were also abolished. There were then a total of 16 ranks, ranging from the Senior First Rank (正一位, shō ichi-i) to the Junior Eighth Rank (従八位, ju hachi-i), as shown below:

English translation	Japanese text	Romanized Japanese	Selected recipients
Senior First Rank	正一位	shō ichi-i	Kusunoki Masashige (1880), Nitta Yoshisada (1882), Iwakura Tomomi (1885), Sanjō Sanetomi (1891), Tokugawa Mitsukuni (1900), Shimazu Nariakira (1901), Mori Takachika (1901), Tokugawa Nariaki (1903), Konoe Tadahiro (1904), Toyotomi Hideyoshi (1915), Oda Nobunaga (1917, the last recipient)
Junior First Rank	従一位	ju ichi-i	Shimazu Hisamitsu (1887), Tokugawa Yoshinobu (1888), Kido Takayoshi (1901), Ōkubo Toshimichi (1901), Itō Hirobumi (1909), Itagaki Taisuke (1919), Ōkuma Shigenobu (1922), Yamagata Aritomo (1922), Matsukata Masayoshi (1924), Tōgō Heihachirō (1934), Tokugawa Iesato (1940), Saionji Kinmochi (1940), Makino Nobuaki (1949), Kantarō Suzuki (1960), Shigeru Yoshida (1967), Eisaku Satō (1975), Yasuhiro Nakasone (2019), Shinzo Abe (2022)
Senior Second Rank	正二位	shō ni-i	Tokugawa Yoshiyori (1876), Mori Arinori (1889), Mutsu Munemitsu (1897), Katsu Kaishū (1899), Saisho Atsushi (1910), Nogi Maresuke (1916), Hara Takashi (1921), Katō Tomosaburō (1923), Tanaka Giichi (1929), Shibusawa Eiichi (1931), Inukai Tsuyoshi (1932), Ichirō Hatoyama (1959), Hayato Ikeda (1965), Masayoshi Ōhira (1980), Nobusuke Kishi (1987), Takeo Miki (1988), Ryutaro Hashimoto (2006), Tomiichi Murayama (2025)
Junior Second Rank	従二位	ju ni-i	Uesugi Kenshin (1908), Date Masamune (1918), Mori Ōgai (1922), Osami Nagano (1943), Tanzan Ishibashi (1973), Fumio Gotō (1980), Hideki Yukawa (1981), Toshiwo Doko (1988), Sōsuke Uno (1998)
Senior Third Rank	正三位	shō san-mi	Saigō Takamori (1889), Kobayakawa Takakage (1908), Kenkichi Yabashi (1927), Yamamoto Isoroku (1943), Mineichi Koga (1944), Yasunari Kawabata (1972), Kōnosuke Matsushita (1989), Soichiro Honda (1991), Masaru Ibuka (1997), Akio Morita (1999), Tsuneo Watanabe (2025)
Junior Third Rank	従三位	ju san-mi	Katō Kiyomasa (1909), Kyōsuke Kindaichi (1971), Akira Kurosawa (1998), Hisaya Morishige (2009), Isuzu Yamada (2012), Ken Takakura (2014), Donald Keene (2019), Sadako Ogata (2019), Shigeo Nagashima (2025), Tatsuya Nakadai (2025)
Senior Fourth Rank	正四位	shō shi-i	
Junior Fourth Rank	従四位	ju shi-i	
Senior Fifth Rank	正五位	shō go-i	
Junior Fifth Rank	従五位	ju go-i	Koo Hsien-jung (1937)
Senior Sixth Rank	正六位	shō roku-i	Kōrō Sasaki (1978)
Junior Sixth Rank	従六位	ju roku-i	
Senior Seventh Rank	正七位	shō shichi-i	
Junior Seventh Rank	従七位	ju shichi-i	
Senior Eighth Rank	正八位	shō hachi-i	
Junior Eighth Rank	従八位	ju hachi-i	

Sanjo Sanetomi was the last living person who received the Senior First Rank (正一位) in 1891, and all subsequent recipients were posthumously received. No persons have been awarded this rank since 1917 when Oda Nobunaga was posthumously awarded.

The 1925 Decree on Ranks (位階令) restricted ordination exclusively to the purpose of conferring honors. Since the current Constitution came into effect in 1947, the presentation of ranks has been limited to those who have already died, with the idea of abolishing the privileges associated with conferring honors, and ranks having been presented posthumously.

Today, the Junior First Rank (従一位) is the highest available rank, which is posthumously conferred primarily on persons deemed being served most to the nation out of former prime ministers. The Senior Second Rank (正二位) is conferred on many former prime ministers, and the Junior Second Rank (従二位) on top-class politicians, such as former speakers of the National Diet and former Chief Justice of the Supreme Court. The Senior Third Rank (正三位) is posthumously conferred mainly on civilians who are recognized as having done the most for the nation's development, such as founders of large companies and the novelists and artists who represented Japan. The Junior Third Rank (従三位) is in many cases conferred on artists who created Japan's famous masterpieces.

The Junior First Rank is bestowed directly by the incumbent Emperor. The Second through Fourth Ranks are awarded by Imperial decree. The awarding of the Fifth Ranks or lower is decided by a hearing from the Cabinet and a decision by the Emperor to the hearing.

== Court positions ==
In the era when the Ritsuryo system was in place, the official position in the court and ikai of bureaucrats were closely related. For example, becoming the Chancellor of the Realm (太政大臣, daijō daijin), the highest position in the administration, required the Senior or Junior First Rank (正一位、従一位, shō ichi-i, ju ichi-i). To become the Minister of the Left, Right, or Center (左大臣、右大臣、内大臣, sadaijin, udaijin, naidaijin), he had to be in either the Senior Second Rank (正二位, shō ni-i) or the Junior Second Rank (従二位, ju ni-i). A Major Counselor (大納言, dainagon) needed the Senior Third Rank (正三位, shō san-mi), and a Middle Counselor (中納言, chūnagon) needed the Junior Third Rank (従三位, ju san-mi). Associate Counselors (参議, sangi) required the Senior Fourth Rank, Lower Grade (正四位下, shō shi-i no ge).

=== Council of State (太政官, daijōkan) ===
- Chancellor of the Realm (太政大臣, daijō daijin)—the highest position in the Council of State. This position was used only when it was necessary to place someone in a position above the Minister of the Left.
- Minister of the Left (左大臣, sadaijin)—the highest permanent position in the Council of State.
- Minister of the Right (右大臣, udaijin)—the second highest position next to the Minister of the Left.
- Minister of the Center (内大臣, naidaijin)—the third highest position next to the Minister of the Right.
- Senior Counselor (大納言, dainagon)—the fourth highest position in the Council of State. The maximum number of this position was originally four and was reduced to two in 705.
- Provisional Senior Counselor (権大納言, gon-dainagon)—when all Senior Counselors were occupied, and a new person was appointed to the Senior Counselor, he was placed in this position.
- Middle Counselor (中納言, chūnagon)—a newly created position to assist Senior Counselors. The maximum number of this position was three.
- Associate Counselor (参議, sangi)—personnel to participate in political discussions, not Senior or Middle Counselors.
- Controller of the Left (左大弁, sadaiben)—controls the Ministers of the center, Civil Service, Ceremonies, and Popular Affairs.
- Controller of the Right (右大弁, udaiben)—controls the Ministers of War, Justice, the Treasury, and the Imperial Household.
- Junior Counselor (少納言, shōnagon)—the top working-level position in the Council of State. The maximum number of this position was three.

Controllers needed the Junior Fourth Rank, Upper Grade. Junior Counselors required the Junior Fifth Rank, Lower Grade.

=== Eight Ministries (八省, hasshō) ===
- Minister of the Center (中務卿, nakatsukasa kyō)—the highest position in the Ministry of the Center (中務省, nakatsukasa shō).
- Minister of Civil Service (治部卿, jibu kyō)—the highest position in the Ministry of Civil Service (治部省, jibu shō).
- Minister of Ceremonies (式部卿, shikibu kyō)—the highest position in the Ministry of Ceremonies (式部省, shikibu shō).
- Minister of Popular Affairs (民部卿, minbu kyō)—the highest position in the Ministry of Popular Affairs (民部省, minbu shō).
- Minister of War (兵部卿, hyōbu kyō)—the highest position in the Ministry of War (兵部省, hyōbu shō).
- Minister of Justice (刑部卿, gyōbu kyō)—the highest position in the Ministry of Justice (刑部省, gyōbu shō).
- Minister of the Treasury (大蔵卿, ōkura kyō)—the highest position in the Ministry of the Treasury (大蔵省, ōkura shō).
- Minister of the Imperial Household (宮内卿, kunai kyō)—the highest position in the Ministry of the Imperial Household (宮内省, kunai shō).

The Minister of the Center needed the Senior Fourth Rank, Upper Grade. Other ministers required the Senior Fourth Rank, Lower Grade.

=== Shiki (職) ===
- Chief Surveyor of Palace Apartments (中宮大夫, chūgū-dayū)—the first-class officer requiring the Junior Fourth Rank, Lower Grade.
- Palace Assistant (中宮亮, chūgū-no-suke)—the second-class officer requiring the Junior Fifth Rank, Lower Grade.

=== Bureau (寮, ryō) ===
- Chief Curator of the Palace (内蔵頭, kura no kami)—the first-class officer of the Bureau of Curation of the Palace (内蔵寮, kura ryō), requiring the Junior Fifth Rank, Lower Grade.
- First Assistant Curator of the Palace (内蔵助, kura no suke)—the second-class officer of the Bureau of Curation of the Palace (内蔵寮, kura ryō), requiring the Junior Sixth Rank, Upper Grade.
- Second Assistant Curator of the Palace (内蔵允, kura no jō)—the third-class officer of the Bureau of Curation of the Palace (内蔵寮, kura ryō), requiring the Junior Seventh Rank, Upper Grade.
- Alternate Curator of the Palace (内蔵属, kura no sakan)—the fourth-class officer of the Bureau of Curation of the Palace (内蔵寮, kura ryō), requiring the Junior Eighth Rank, Lower Grade or the Greater Initial Rank, Upper Grade.
- Chief Court Architect (内匠頭, takumi no kami)—the first-class officer of the Bureau of Court Architect (内匠寮, takumi ryō), requiring the Junior Fifth Rank, Upper Grade.
- Chief Court Musician (雅楽頭, uta no kami)—the first-class officer of the Bureau of Court Musician (雅楽寮, uta ryō), requiring the Junior Fifth Rank, Upper Grade.
- Chief Diplomat (玄蕃頭, genba no kami)—the first-class officer of the Bureau of Diplomacy (玄蕃寮, genba ryō), requiring the Junior Fifth Rank, Upper Grade.
- Director of the Bureau of Computation (主計頭, kazue no kami)—the first-class officer of the Bureau of Computation (主計寮, kazue ryō), requiring the Junior Fifth Rank, Upper Grade.
- Assistant Director of the Bureau of Computation (主計助, kazue no suke)—the second-class officer of the Bureau of Computation (主計寮, kazue ryō), requiring the Senior Sixth Rank, Lower Grade.
- Director of the Tax Bureau (主税頭, chikara no kami)—the first-class officer of the Tax Bureau (主税寮, chikara ryō), requiring the Junior Fifth Rank, Upper Grade.
- Assistant Director of the Tax Bureau (主税助, chikara no suke)—the second-class officer of the Tax Bureau (主税寮, chikara ryō), requiring the Senior Sixth Rank, Lower Grade.
- Captain of the Left Division of the Bureau of Horses (左馬頭, sama no kami)—the first-class officer of the Left Division of the Bureau of Horses (左馬寮, sama ryō), requiring the Junior Fifth Rank, Upper Grade.
- Captain of the Right Division of the Bureau of Horses (右馬頭, uma no kami; or migi no uma no kami)—the first-class officer of the Right Division of the Bureau of Horses (右馬寮, uma ryō), requiring the Junior Fifth Rank, Upper Grade.
- Chief Court Astrologer (陰陽頭, onmyō no kami)—the first-class officer of the Bureau of Court Astrology (陰陽寮, onmyō ryō), requiring the Junior Fifth Rank, Lower Grade.
- Chief Court Calendar-maker (暦博士, reki hakase)—a person recognized by the state as a learned person in charge of creating the state calendar. He needed the Junior Seventh Rank, Upper Grade.
- Chief Court Astronomer (天文博士, tenmon hakase)—a person recognized by the state as a learned person in charge of astronomy. He required the Senior Seventh Rank, Lower Grade.
- Chief Court Timekeeper (漏刻博士, rōkoku hakase)—a person recognized by the state as a learned person in charge of national timekeeping. He required the Junior Seventh Rank, Lower Grade.
- Imperial Tutor or Reader (侍読, jidoku)—a scholar who served at the Emperor's side and taught learning.

=== Division of Inner Palace Guards (近衛府, kon'e fu) ===
- Major Captain of the Left Division of Inner Palace Guards (左近衛大将, sakon'e no taishō)
- Major Captain of the Right Division of Inner Palace Guards (右近衛大将, ukon'e no taishō)
- Middle Captain of the Right Division of Inner Palace Guards (右近衛中将, ukon'e no chūjō)
- Provisional Middle Captain of the Right Division of Inner Palace Guards (右近衛権中将, ukon'e no gon no chūjō)
- Minor Captain of the Left Division of Inner Palace Guards (左近衛少将, sakon'e no shōshō)
- Provisional Minor Captain of the Left Division of Inner Palace Guards (左近衛権少将, sakon'e gon no shōshō)
- Lieutenant of the Right Division of Inner Palace Guards (右近衛将監, ukon'e no shōgen)
- Lieutenant of the Left Division of Inner Palace Guards (左近衛将監, sakon'e no shōgen)

=== Division of Military Guards (兵衛府, hyō'e fu) ===
- Head of Left Military Guards (左兵衛督, sahyō'e no kami)
- Head of Right Military Guards (右兵衛督, uhyō'e no kami)
- Assistant Head of Left Military Guards (左兵衛佐, sahyō'e no suke)
- Provisional Assistant Master of the Left Military Guard (左兵衛権佐, sahyō'e gon no suke)
- Assistant Head of Right Military Guards (右兵衛佐, uhyō'e no suke)
- Provisional Assistant Master of the Right Military Guard (右兵衛権佐, uhyō'e gon no suke)

=== Chamberlain Office (蔵人所, Kurōdo-dokoro) ===
- Head Chamberlain (蔵人頭, kurōdo no tō; or kurōdo no kami)
- Chamberlain (蔵人, kurōdo)
- Assistant Chamberlain (次侍従, ji-jijū)

=== Provincial Governor (地方国司) ===
- Governor (守, kami)
- Provisional Governor (権守, gon no kami)

=== Others ===
- Empress Dowager (皇太后, kōtaigō)

== Hereditary titles ==
A hereditary title was conferred by an Emperor on an Imperial family member, a noble, or a clan under the kabane system to signify his political and social status. This title was inherited from generation to generation in the family until the hereditary title system was discontinued in 1871 by law.

- Mahito (真人)—the highest noble title of the court personnel. Mahito was mainly conferred to Imperial families.
- Ason (朝臣)—the second highest noble title next to Mahito. Ason was practically the highest title for non-imperial-household clans.
- Sukune (宿禰)—the third highest noble title. The clans with Sukune represented military and administrative officers.
- Imiki (忌寸)—the fourth highest noble title. It was mainly conferred to Hata and Yamato-no-Aya clans.
- Michinoshi (道師)—the fifth highest noble title. There is no record that this title was conferred.
- Omi (臣)—the sixth highest noble title. It was recorded to be conferred mainly on Soga, Kose, Ki, Katsuragi, and Hozumi clans.
- Muraji (連)—the seventh highest noble title. It was conferred on Mononobe, Nakatomi, Yuge, Otomo and Haji clans.
- Inagi (稲置)—the eighth highest noble title. There was no precedent for this title being conferred.
- Tomo no Miyatsuko (伴造)—a title of gōzoku who were subordinate to nobles with Muraji.
- Momoamariyaso no Tomo (百八十部)—a lower title than Tomo no Miyatsuko.
- Kuni no Miyatsuko (国造)—a title for officers ruling provinces.
- Agatanushi (県主)—a title of rulers of a smaller area than a province.
