= Asano no Katori =

Asano no Katori (朝野鹿取; 774–843) was a Japanese kanshi poet of the early Heian period. He studied Classical Chinese at the Imperial University before going on to visit China in one of the Japanese missions to Tang China. Six of his poems were included in the Bunka Shūreishū, and he was also selected to work on the Nihon Kōki, one of Japan's Six National Histories.

== Biography ==
Asano no Katori was born in 774. He was the natural son of Oshinumihara no Muraji Takatori (忍海原連鷹取), but was adopted by Asano no Sukune Michinaga (朝野宿禰道長).

He researched Chinese history and Chinese literature at the Imperial University, changing his field of study from Chinese pronunciation (音生) to Chinese literature (文章生 monjōshō) while there.

In Enryaku 21 (802), he was selected as undersecretary for one of the Japanese missions to Tang China. In 804 he journeyed to China in the company of Sugawara no Kiyotomo, Kūkai, Saichō and others, and the following year returned to Japan.

In the third month of Kōnin 1 (810) Katori was made chamberlain, and became a teacher to Emperor Saga. He served in various administrative positions in both the capital and the provinces before becoming counsellor in Tenchō 10 (833).

The following year (Jōwa 1) he became Major Controller of the Left (左大弁 sadaiben), and two years later Minister of Popular Affairs. In 842 he was promoted to the Junior Third Rank and was appointed governor of Etchū Province. His children were given the hereditary title Ason.

The Shoku Nihon Kōki records that he died on the eleventh day of the sixth month of Jōwa 10 (843) in his seventieth year.

== Writings ==
=== Poetry ===
Six of Katori's Chinese poems (kanshi) were included in the Bunka Shūreishū.

=== Other writings ===
He assisted in the compilation of both the Dairi-shiki and the Nihon Kōki, one of the Six National Histories. Takashi Kigoshi (木越隆), in his article on Katori for the Nihon Koten Bungaku Daijiten, speculates that his selection for this job, in addition to his being selected to travel to China, was an official acknowledgement of his mastery of Chinese studies.

== Works cited ==
- Kigoshi, Takashi (1983). "Asano no Katori". Nihon Koten Bungaku Daijiten 日本古典文学大辞典 (in Japanese). Vol. 1. Tokyo: Iwanami Shoten. p. 42. OCLC 11917421.
