= Gōzoku =

Japanese term for powerful and wealthy families

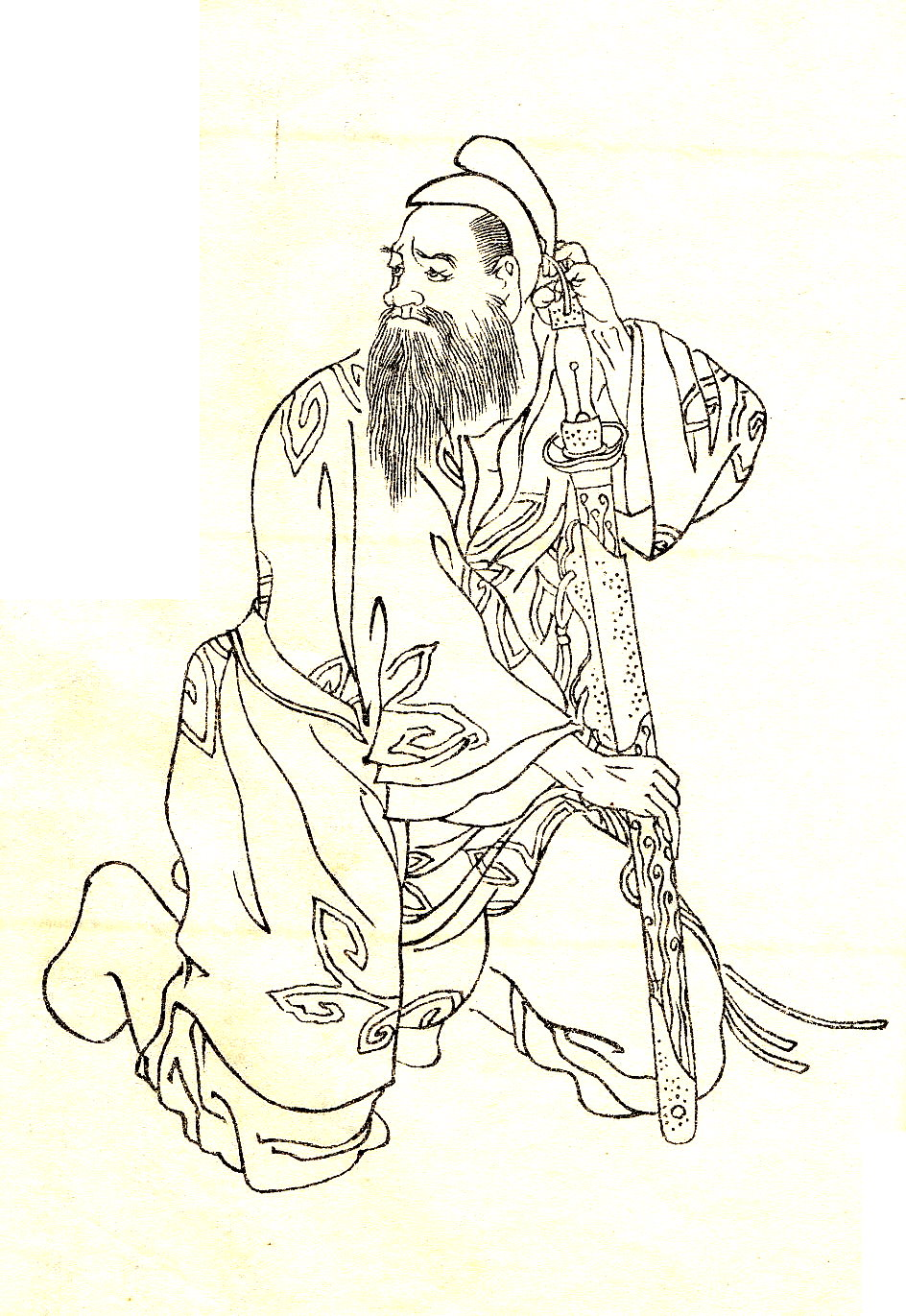
Mononobe no Arakabi, a government minister and gōzoku of the Yamato period

Gōzoku (豪族; lit. "powerful clan"), in Japanese, refers to powerful regional families. In historical context, it can refer to powerful non-royal families regardless of their area of influence, in contrast to the Imperial Family. The most powerful gōzoku families of the Yamato period included the Soga clan, Mononobe clan and Katsuragi clan.

== History ==
In the Yamato period prior to the ritsuryō system, the powerful clans based in Yamato Province and Kawachi Province were referred to as the chūō gōzoku (central gōzoku), while the term chihō gōzoku (regional gōzoku) referred to powerful clans outside the immediate vicinity of the capital who served as kuni no miyatsuko and agatanushi. The central gōzoku held kabane titles such as omi and muraji, while the regional gōzoku held titles such as atai and kimi. The most powerful daigōzoku ("great gōzoku") included the Katsuragi clan, Ōtomo clan, Mononobe clan, and Soga clan.

After the implementation of the ritsuryō system, the central gōzoku became kizoku, the aristocracy, and took part in central politics. The regional gōzoku remained practically unchanged and took part in regional politics. Under the ritsuryō system, gōzoku referred to powerful regional families holding a court rank of Sixth Rank or below or who were unranked, in contrast to the royals and the aristocracy, who held a court rank of Fifth Rank or above. Under this system, the gōzoku typically served as district governors or as junior officials in provincial governments, and thus took on the duties of local administration.

In the Middle Ages, gōzoku referred to a class of regional officials such as jitō (territory governor), shōkan (manor administrator) and geshi (junior official at a manor). However, after Muromachi period, the term gōzoku fell out of use and was replaced by the term dogō, which referred to jizamurai (provincial peasant-warrior in charge of a small rural domain), kumon (official at a manor in charge of official documents) and satanin (official at a manor in charge of executing orders and judgements on behalf of the lord).

During and after the Edo period, neither the terms gōzoku nor dogō were used. The terms gōnō and gōshō replaced the previous class distinction following the rise of wealthy farmers and wealthy merchants during the Edo period.

== See also ==
- Gōnō
- Nanushi
