= Isonokami no Yakatsugu =

Japanese noble and scholar of the late Nara period

Isonokami no Yakatsugu 石上宅嗣
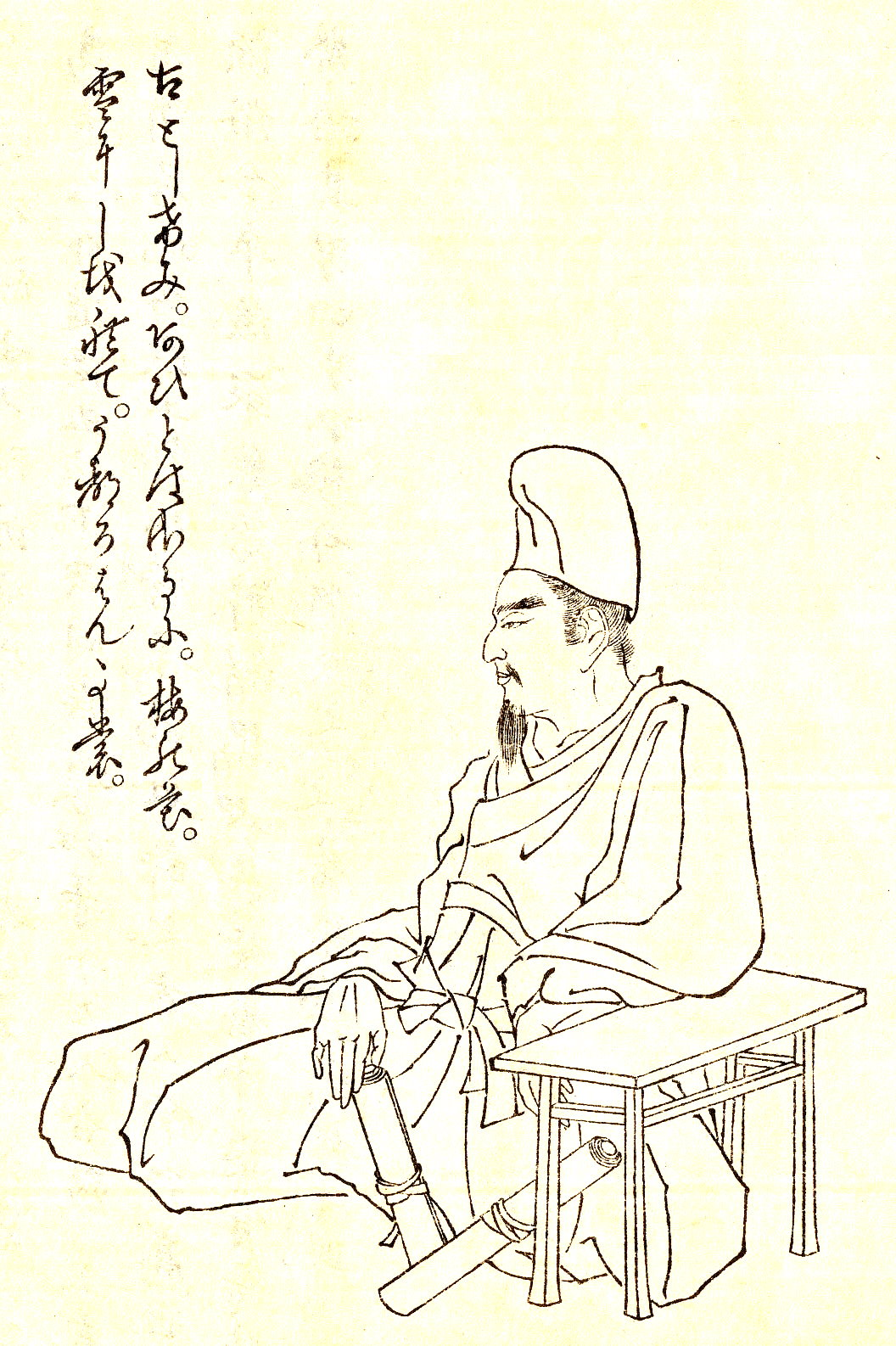
- Illustration by Kikuchi Yōsai, from Zenken Kojitsu
- Born: 729
- Died: July 23, 781
- Father: Isonokami no Otomaro

Isonokami no Yakatsugu (石上 宅嗣; 729 – July 23, 781) was a Japanese noble and scholar of the late Nara period. He was the grandson of the sadaijin Isonokami no Maro and son of the chūnagon Isonokami no Otomaro. Yakatsugu himself reached the court rank of shō san-mi (正三位) and the position of dainagon, and was posthumously awarded the rank of shō ni-i (正二位).

== Life ==
In 751, Yakatsugu was promoted from shō roku-i no ge (正六位下) to ju go-i no ge (従五位下) and appointed second assistant to the Minister of Ceremonies (治部少輔). In 757, he was promoted to ju go-i no jō (従五位上) and appointed governor of Sagami province, in 759 the governor of Mikawa province, and in 761 the governor of Kazusa province. In 761 he was also appointed vice-envoy to Tang dynasty China, but in the next year was replaced by Fujiwara no Tamaro without making the voyage over. In 763, he was appointed vice-minister in the Shikibu-shō.

Yakatsugu plotted with Fujiwara no Yoshitsugu, Ōtomo no Yakamochi, and Saeki no Imaemishi to overthrow the daijō-daijin and power of the day, Fujiwara no Nakamaro, but their plot was discovered. In 764, Yakatsugu was demoted to an assistant minister in the Dazaifu — until nine months later, when Nakamaro led his own failed rebellion. Yakatsugu was rehabilitated, promoted to shō go-i no jō (正五位上), and made governor of Hitachi province.

Under Dōkyō's ensuing government, Yakatsugu was steadily promoted, rising in 765 to ju shi-i no ge (従四位下) and lieutenant general in the imperial guard (中衛中将), and joining the ranks of the kugyō with a promotion to sangi in the next year, 766. Later that year, he was promoted to shō shi-i no ge (正四位下), and in 768 to ju san-mi (従三位).

Upon the death of Empress Shōtoku in 770, Yakatsugu aligned with Fujiwara no Nagate in supporting the future Emperor Kōnin as her successor. The appreciative new emperor continued to value him, and Yakatsugu was promoted to chūnagon in 771 and dainagon in 780, making him the third highest ranking figure in the daijō-kan after udaijin Ōnakatomi no Kiyomaro and naidaijin Fujiwara no Uona. During this period, he also held positions as head of the Dazaifu, shikibu-sho, Ministry of the Center, and Crown Prince's Quarters. In 775, he reclaimed his family's old name of Mononobe no Ason, but in 779 he changed it back to Isonokami, now as Ō-Ason (大朝臣).

In 781 Yakatsugu was promoted to shō san-mi (正三位), but died two months later. He was posthumously awarded the rank of shō ni-i (正二位).

== Personality ==
Yakatsugu also exhibited a fine appearance. His speech and behavior were calm and elegant.

A great lover of the Confucian classics and historical texts, he was familiar with a wide variety of books. He also liked to write, and was proficient in both cursive script and clerical script. He wrote kanshi, and was considered a leading scholar of his day along with Ōmi no Mifune. His works are included in the Keikokushū.

He was also versed in Buddhism, and wrote Jōmyōkyō-san (浄名経讃) and Nenbutsu-gokō-san (念仏五更讃) on the subject. He built a temple called Ashuku-ji (阿閦寺) on his former residence, and in a corner of the complex he established a library called Untei. Here he made various texts available to the public, focusing primarily on non-Buddhist works. This is believed to have been Japan's first public library.

== Genealogy ==
- Father: Isonokami no Otomaro
- Mother: Unknown
- Wife: Unknown
  - Son: Isonokami no Tsugutari (石上継足)
  - Daughter: wife of Fujiwara no Otomo (藤原雄友)
