= Kimi (kabane) =

Ancient Japanese hereditary title

Kimi (君) was an ancient Japanese hereditary title denoting rank and political standing (a kabane) that was reserved for certain members of the Tomo no Miyatsuko clans, which were clans associated with particular occupations. They became a hereditary title passed down the generations. The kimi rank was lower than the muraji and omi ranks in political power and standing during much of the Kofun period and Asuka period which are collectively grouped as the Yamato period.

"Kimi" literally means "Lord" (of a local area). For example, in the name Kamitsukeno no Kimi Wakako, "Kamitsukeno no kimi" means "Lord of Kamitsukeno" and Wakako is his personal name. Sometimes the character (公) is used in place of (君).

== List of Kimi (君) ==
  - Oka no Kimi Yoroshi (岡君宜), sent as envoy to Tang dynasty, China for Emperor Kōtoku.
- Bungo Province (豊後国)
  - Okita no Kimi Esaka (大分君惠尺, died 675), important member of the court for Emperor Tenmu during the Jinshin War.
  - Okita no Kimi Wakaomi (大分君稚臣, died 679) also called Wakami (稚見), important member of the court for Emperor Tenmu during the Jinshin War.
- Hi Province (火国 or 肥国)
  - Hi no Kimi Take Wokumi (火君健男組 / 肥君健男組), legendary ancestor of the Hi no Kimi clan who was granted the title by Emperor Sujin for pacifying the area.
  - Hi no Kimi Ite (火君猪手 / 肥君猪手), lived in northern Kyushu in 702 during the reign of Emperor Monmu.
- Kōzuke Province (上野国)
  - Sami no Sukunamaro (佐味宿那麻呂 / 佐味君少麻呂), fought for Emperor Temmu during the Jinshin War.
- Mino Province (美濃国)
  - Mori no Kimi Oiwa (守君大石), sent in 661 to rescue Baekje by Emperor Tenji who sent him after in 665 to the Tang dynasty as an envoy.
  - Mori no Kimi Karita (守君刈田), granted the rank of Jikiko-shi by Empress Jitō in 691.
- Nagato Province (長門国)
  - Ina no Kimi Takami (猪名公高見, died 672), lived during the time of Emperor Kōtoku.
- Ōmi Province (近江国)
  - Inukami no Kimi Mitasuki (犬上君三田耜 / 犬上御田鍬), sent by Empress Suiko in 614 to Sui dynasty, China returning home 615 from Baekje. Also sent by Emperor Jomei as an envoy to the Tang dynasty, China in 630.
  - Inukami no Kimi Takerube (犬上君健部), minister of Emperor Kōtoku.
  - Inukami no Kimi Shiromaro (犬上君白麻呂), son of Mitasuki, sent as ambassador by Empress Saimei to Goguryeo.
- Shimotsuke Province (下野国)
  - Kamitsukeno no Kimi Okuma (上毛野君小熊), participated in the feud of the Kuni no miyatsuko of Musashi Province, Omi and his relative Oki.
  - Kamitsukeno no Kimi Katana (上毛野君形名), father of Wakako. In 637 he led an expedition against the Emishi.
  - Kamitsukeno no Kimi Wakako (上毛野君稚子), led 27,000 soldiers to help Baekje in 662.
  - Kamitsukeno no Kimi Michiji (上毛野君三千), son of Wakako, government official.
- Suruga Province (駿河国)
  - Iohara no Kimi (廬原君), led 10,000 soldiers to help Baekje in 662. Personal name unknown.
- Tsukushi Province (筑紫国)
  - Tsukushi no Kimi Iwai (筑紫君磐井, died 528), political arch-rival of Emperor Keitai and led a failed rebellion in 527, known as the Iwai Rebellion ending with his death. The Iwatoyama kofun in Fukuoka was recorded in Fudoki of Chikugo to be his tomb.
  - Tsukushi no Kimi Kazuko (筑紫君葛子), son of Iwai. He feared being put to death on implication because of his father's rebellion, and gave to the Emperor the miyake of Kasuya. There is no record of his death, so it is believed he lived on.
  - Tsukushi no Kimi Sachiyama (筑紫君薩野馬 / 筑紫君薩夜麻), in 671 he served as an envoy for Emperor Tenji and in 690 for Empress Jito with the Tang dynasty of China.
- Yamashiro Province (山城国)
  - Miwa no Kimi Sakau (三輪君逆, died 586), brother of Osazaki. He was minister for Emperor Bidatsu.
  - Miwa no Kimi Osazaki (三輪君小鷦鷯), brother of Sakau. He suffered intense questioning for raping the ladies in waiting of Emperor Jomei and stabbed himself in the neck and died.
  - Miwa no Kurukuma no Kimi Azumahito (三輪栗隈君東人), from a cadet branch of the Miwa clan. In 645 he was dispatched two times to confirm the border between Baekje and the Gaya confederacy.
  - Miwa no Kimi Okuchi (輪君大口), from a cadet branch of the Miwa clan. Lived during the reign of Emperor Kōtoku.
  - Miwa no Kimi Fumiya (三輪文屋, died 643), son of Osazaki. He escaped with Prince Yamashiro, the son of Prince Shōtoku to Mount Ikoma (生駒山) and they were both killed there.
  - Miwa no Kimi Shikobu (三輪君色夫), son of Sakau. He was dispatched with the army to Silla in 649.
  - Miwa no Kimi Nemaro (三輪君根麻呂), general who was dispatched to Japan with 27,000 soldiers in 663 and fought the Battle of Baekgang.
  - Miwa no Kimi Togane (三輪君利金), son of Fumiya, father of Takechimaro. He was ranked Daikajō (大花上), which was a high crown rank. The Ōmiwa clan regained power during his generation.
  - Miwa no Kimi Kobito (三輪君子首, died 676), son of Shikobu. He was minister of Emperor Tenmu.
  - Miwa no Kimi Takechimaro (三輪君高市麻呂, 657–706), son of Togane, grandson of Fumiya. He fought for Emperor Tenmu during the Jinshin War.

== See also ==
- Gōzoku
- Kabane
- Kuni no miyatsuko
- Omi
- Muraji
- Kofun period
- Asuka period
- Yamato period
