= Kitayatsu Site =

Ruins of a Kofun period residence in Takasaki, Japan

- 北谷遺跡 (Japanese)
- Kitayatsu Site Kitayatsu Site (Japan)
- 36°23′57″N 139°00′35″E
- Type: settlement ruins
- Periods: Kofun period
- Location: Takasaki, Gunma, Japan
- Region: Kantō region

History
- Built: late 5th century

Site notes
- Public access: Yes (no facilities)

The Kitayatsu Site (北谷遺跡, Kitayatsu iseki) is an archaeological site with the ruins of a Kofun period residence located in what is now the Higashimachi neighborhood of the city of Takasaki, Gunma Prefecture in the northern Kantō region of Japan. It was designated a National Historic Site of Japan in 2005, and extended in 2020. It is contemporary with the nearby Hodota Kofun Cluster which has a separate National Historic Site designation.

== Overview ==
The Kitayatsu site is located is located on a plateau at an elevation of 145 meters that spreads out at the foot of the southeastern foot of Mount Haruna. In the year 2000, the ruins of a large fortified residence belonging to a gōzoku clan ruling the surrounding area during the Kofun period was discovered. The site was fortified by two ravines forming natural moats to the east and west and two artificial moats with a width of 30 meters and depth of three meters to protect the northern and southern sides. The moats contained masonry with a breccia substrate, and it appears that the north and west moats also served for water storage. It is estimated through analysis of the volcanic ash from an eruption of Mount Asama which had accumulated in the moats to date from the latter half of the 5th century AD, or the middle of the Kofun period. The site of the residence is a square 90 meters on each side, containing buildings arranged in a "U" shape, forming a courtyard that was open to the south.

The ruins are approximately the same size and shape as the Mitsuji I site about three kilometers away, and are believed to have been built to a common standard. It is assumed to have been the residence for the persons buried in the kofun of the Hodota Kofun Cluster, which consists of three large keyhole-shaped tumuli (zenpō-kōen-fun (前方後円墳)) located one kilometer to the northwest. The site was backfilled after excavation. It is located about 35 minutes by car from Takasaki Station. There are no public facilities.

== See also ==
- List of Historic Sites of Japan (Gunma)
