= Isonokami no Maro =

Japanese statesman (640–717)

Isonokami no Maro 石上麻呂
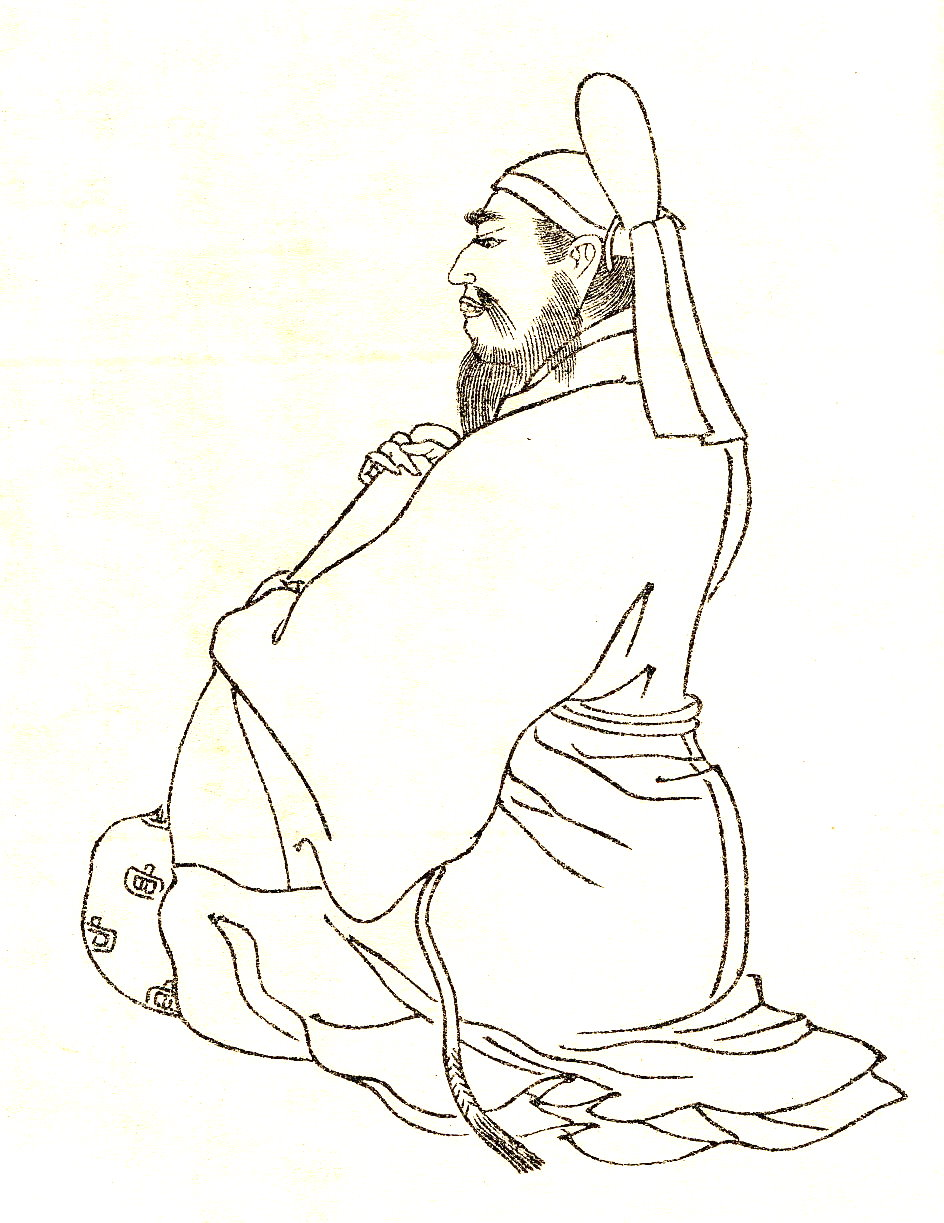
- Illustration by Kikuchi Yōsai, from Zenken Kojitsu
- Born: 640
- Died: April 22, 717

Isonokami no Maro (石上麻呂; 640 - April 22, 717) was a Japanese statesman of the Asuka period and early Nara period His family name was Mononobe no Muraji, later Mononobe no Ason and Isonokami no Ason. He attained the court rank of shō ni-i (正二位) and sadaijin, and posthumously ju ichi-i (従一位).

In 672 Maro supported Prince Ōtomo (later known as Emperor Kōbun) in the Jinshin War until the prince's suicide. He was forgiven and sent as an envoy to Silla in 676. After this he served as a judge (法官), and as head of the dazaifu in 700. He became centrally involved in politics with a promotion to dainagon in 701, making udaijin in 704 and sadaijin in 708. Between 715 and his death in 717 Maro was the most powerful man in the daijō-kan.

Maro is also thought to be the model of Isonokami no Marotari (石上まろたり), one of Princess Kaguya's five noble suitors in The Tale of the Bamboo Cutter.

== Rise to power ==
Mononobe no Maro first appears in historical documents at the conclusion of the Jinshin War of 672, on the side of Prince Ōtomo. His activities in the war are not known, but Maro, along with a few other retainers, followed the Prince until his suicide.

In 676, Maro was sent to Silla as an ambassador. Japan and Silla exchanged frequent envoys at this time. Maro returned some four months later. Why Emperor Tenmu granted Maro such a position after his side's defeat is uncertain. It may be that his loyalty in serving his lord until the end won him some respect. Alternately, the meritorious service of Enoi no Okimi, also of the Mononobe family, on Tenmu's side may have softened his family's treatment. Four months after Maro's return, Okimi died and was posthumously named the head of the family.

With the 684 reform of the kabane system, the Mononobe clan's kabane was changed from Muraji to Ason. The clan's name appears to have been changed to Isonokami around this time. At the funeral service of Emperor Tenmu, Maro spoke a condolence message as a representative of the ministry of justice.

In 689, Maro was dispatched with Ishikawa no Mushina (石川虫名) to Tsukushi Province to deliver court rank diplomas. He participated in Empress Jitō's enthronement ceremony in 690, and in 700 was put in charge of the Dazaifu.

In 701, Maro was promoted to shō san-mi (正三位) and from chūnagon to dainagon under the new Taihō Code.

Later that year, Tajihi no Shima died, and Maro went with Prince Osakabe to deliver a gift from the Emperor to his house. When the udaijin Abe no Miushi died in 703, Maro was again the deliverer of gifts and condolences.

== As daijin ==
In 704, Maro possessed the rank of ju ni-i (従二位), and was promoted to udaijin. He was now the second highest-ranking official after the chi-daijō-kanji (知太政官事). Prince Osakabe, and the highest-ranking official outside of the imperial family. In 705, Osakabe was replaced as chi-daijō-kanji by Prince Hozumi.

In 708, Maro was granted the rank of shō ni-i (正二位), along with Fujiwara no Fuhito. Two months later, Maro was promoted to the long-vacant position of sadaijin, and Fuhito filled his vacancy as udaijin. However, Fuhito is supposed to have been the real political power at this time.

In 710, the capital was moved to Heijō-kyō, and Maro was put in charge of the old capital. Four months later, his servant Musa no Saga (牟佐相摸) offered to the Emperor an auspicious melon, and officials both civil and military reported to the Emperor their congratulations.

In 715, Prince Hozumi died, leaving Maro as the highest-ranking retainer. On April 22, 717, Maro died at the age of 78. Empress Genshō lamented his loss deeply, sending Prince Nagaya and Tajihi no Miyakemaro (多治比三宅麻呂) on a condolence call to his home and granting him the posthumous rank of ju ichi-i (従一位). Condolences were presented by representatives of the daijō-kan, nobles above the fifth rank, and nobles below the sixth rank. The Shoku Nihongi records that there was none among the people who did not mourn his loss (追慕し痛惜しない百姓はなかった). Eight months later additional presents were made to him, of rough silk, thread, cotton, and cloth.

== Genealogy ==
- Father: Mononobe no Umaro (物部宇麻呂, also 馬古, 宇麻乃)
- Mother: Unknown
- Wife: Unknown
  - Daughter: Main wife of Fujiwara no Umakai
  - Son: Isonokami no Azumabito (石上東人)
  - Son: Isonokami no Katsuo (石上勝男)
  - Son: Isonokami no Morō (石上諸男)
  - Son: Isonokami no Ōshima (石上大島)
  - Son: Isonokami no Otomaro (石上乙麻呂; ?-750)
