= Isonokami no Otomaro =

Japanese noble and scholar of the Nara period

Isonokami no Otomaro 石上乙麻呂
- Died: October 9, 750
- Father: Isonokami no Maro

Isonokami no Otomaro (石上 乙麻呂; ? – October 9, 750) was a Japanese noble and scholar of the Nara period. He was the son of sadaijin Isonokami no Maro. He reached the court rank of ju san-mi (従三位) and the position of chūnagon.

== Life ==
In 724, Otomaro was promoted from shō roku-i no ge (正六位下) to ju go-i no ge (従五位下). In 732 he was promoted again to ju go-i no ge (従五位上) and governor of Tanba province. Under the successive administrations of the four sons of Fujiwara no Fuhito and Tachibana no Moroe, Otomaro rose quickly, to shō go-i no ge (正五位下) in 736, shō go-i no jō (正五位上) in 737, and in 738 to ju shi-i no ge (従四位下) and sadaiben in the Daijō-kan.

In 739 he was charged with an affair with Kume no Wakame, the wife of Fujiwara no Umakai, and exiled to Tosa Province.

He was soon pardoned, and in 743 rose again to ju shi-i no jō (従四位上). Passing through various ministerial positions, he joined the ranks of the kugyō in 748 with a promotion to ju san-mi (従三位) and sangi. In 749, he was made chūnagon. He was also appointed in 746 as an envoy to Tang China, but the mission was cancelled. The planned objectives of the mission are supposed to have been to check Silla, with which Japan's relations were strained, and to import gold.

In 750, Otomaro died. His final rank was ju san-mi (従三位), and he held the positions of chūnagon and chief administrator of the Ministry of the Center.

== Genealogy ==
- Father: Isonokami no Maro
- Mother: Unknown
- Wife: Unknown
  - Son: Isonokami no Okitsugu (石上息嗣)
  - Son: Isonokami no Yakatsugu
