= Takashima Shūhan =

Japanese samurai (1798–1866)

- 高島秋帆
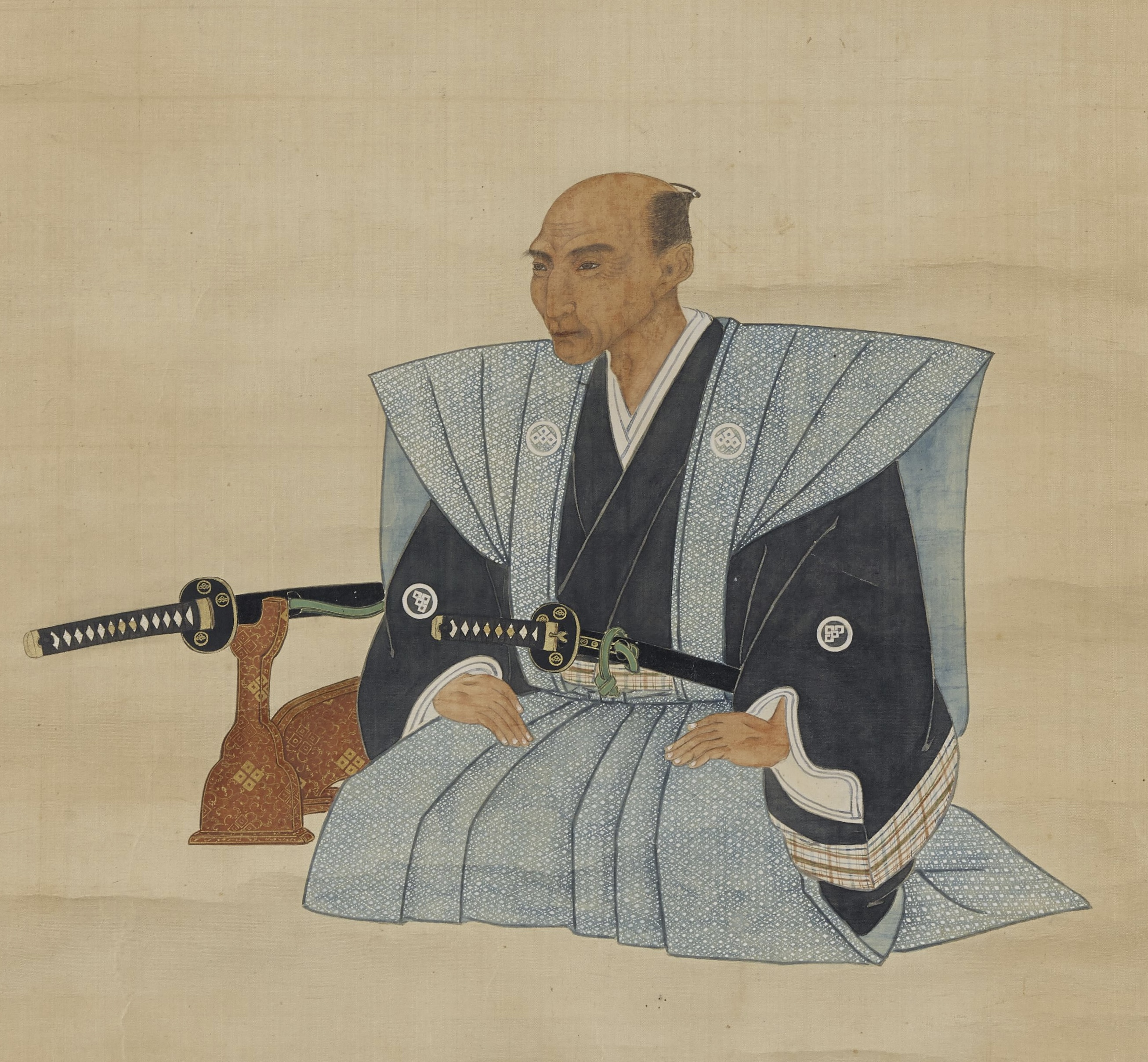
- Born: September 24, 1798; Nagasaki, Japan
- Died: February 28, 1866 (aged 67); Edo, Japan

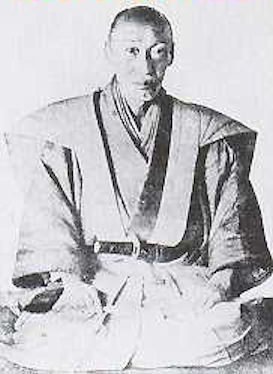
Photograph of Takashima Shūhan

Takashima Shūhan (高島秋帆; September 24, 1798 – February 28, 1866) was a Japanese samurai, ballistics expert, and military engineer in Bakumatsu period Japan. He is significant in having started to import flintlock guns from the Netherlands at the end of Japan's period of Seclusion, during the Late Tokugawa Shogunate. Throughout his life Takashima Shūhan was one of the early Japanese reformists who argued for the modernization of Japan in order to better resist the West. His experience was close to that of Sakuma Shōzan, who was also attacked for adopting Western ideas.

== Biography ==
=== Early life ===
Takashima was the son of one of the senior administrators of Nagasaki and head of the Nagasaki Kaisho, the shogunate's official trade representative with the Dutch trading post at Dejima. The Takashima family was regarded as one of the four leading families in Nagasaki, and for generations they held administrative power in the town as town elders. The Takashima clan claimed descent as a cadet branch of the Sasaki clan.

At age ten, Takashima Shūhan was shocked by the incident in Nagasaki in 1808, where the Royal Navy frigate HMS Phaeton demanded supplies from the harbour chief before sailing away. He was sent to Osaka for studies, and succeeded his father in 1814. Takashima started to study Western weaponry and, after the 1825 Edict to expel foreigners at all cost ("Don't think twice" policy, 異国船無二念打払令), managed to obtain some weapons through the Dutch, including field guns, mortars and firearms. The guns were known in Japan as Geweer (gun in Dutch) from the 1840s.

At the time, Nagasaki was the only point of contact between Japan and the Western nations due to the Tokugawa shogunate's national isolation policy. Takashima was shocked to find the difference between Japanese and Western technology, especially in terms of weapons. Takashima set up an artillery foundry at his own expense based on Dutch designs in 1834, and present a bronze mortar to Nabeshima Shigeyoshi, daimyō of Saga Domain in 1835. Various domains sent students to learn from Takashima. They included samurai from Satsuma Domain after the intrusion of an American warship in 1837 in Kagoshima Bay, and from Saga Domain and Chōshū Domain, both southern domains exposed to Western intrusions.

=== Shogunate official ===
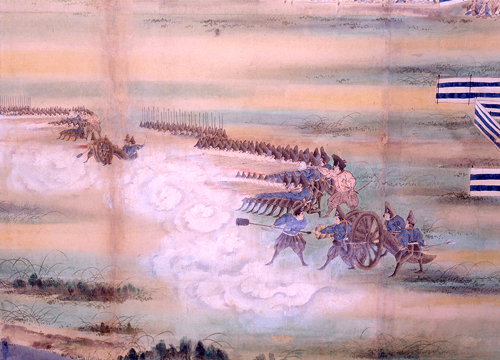
Demonstration of Western firearms by Takashima Shūhan in 1841.

In 1840, Takashima was made a toshiyori, or Senior Administrator, for the city of Nagasaki. From 1840, following the outbreak of the Opium War in China, Takashima appealed to the Shogunate to reinforce Japan's military capabilities. The war in China had made clear that traditional ways were not sufficient to keep the Westerners at bay, and that radical modernization, especially that of artillery, was needed to be able to resist.

Takashima Shūhan established two companies of infantry equipped with guns, as well as one artillery battery, making him Japan's first modern student of Western arms. In 1841, Takashima Shūhan caught the attention of Bakufu official Egawa Tarōzaemon. Takashima made a demonstration with 125 men, using Dutch Rangaku textbooks and Dutch commands for drilling. He demonstrated the use of four cannons and 50 Western guns. His students included Egawa Hidekatsu.

In 1843, Takashima was vindicated, as the shogunate authorized the usage of Western guns for defenses. By 1852 Satsuma and Saga had reverbatory furnaces to produce the iron necessary for firearms.

=== House arrest and rehabilitation ===
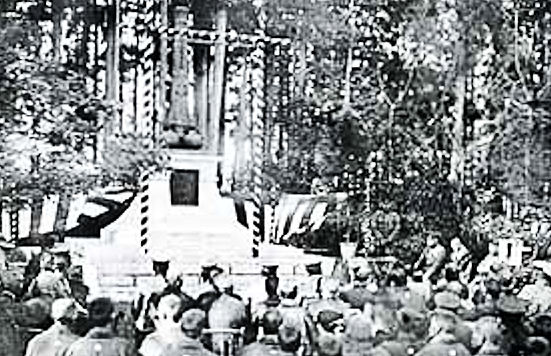
Monument to Takashima Shūhan in Shūgetsuin (松月院) Temple, Akatsuka (赤塚), Itabashi, Tokyo, decorated with a cannon and flaming cannonballs. Ceremony held in 1922.

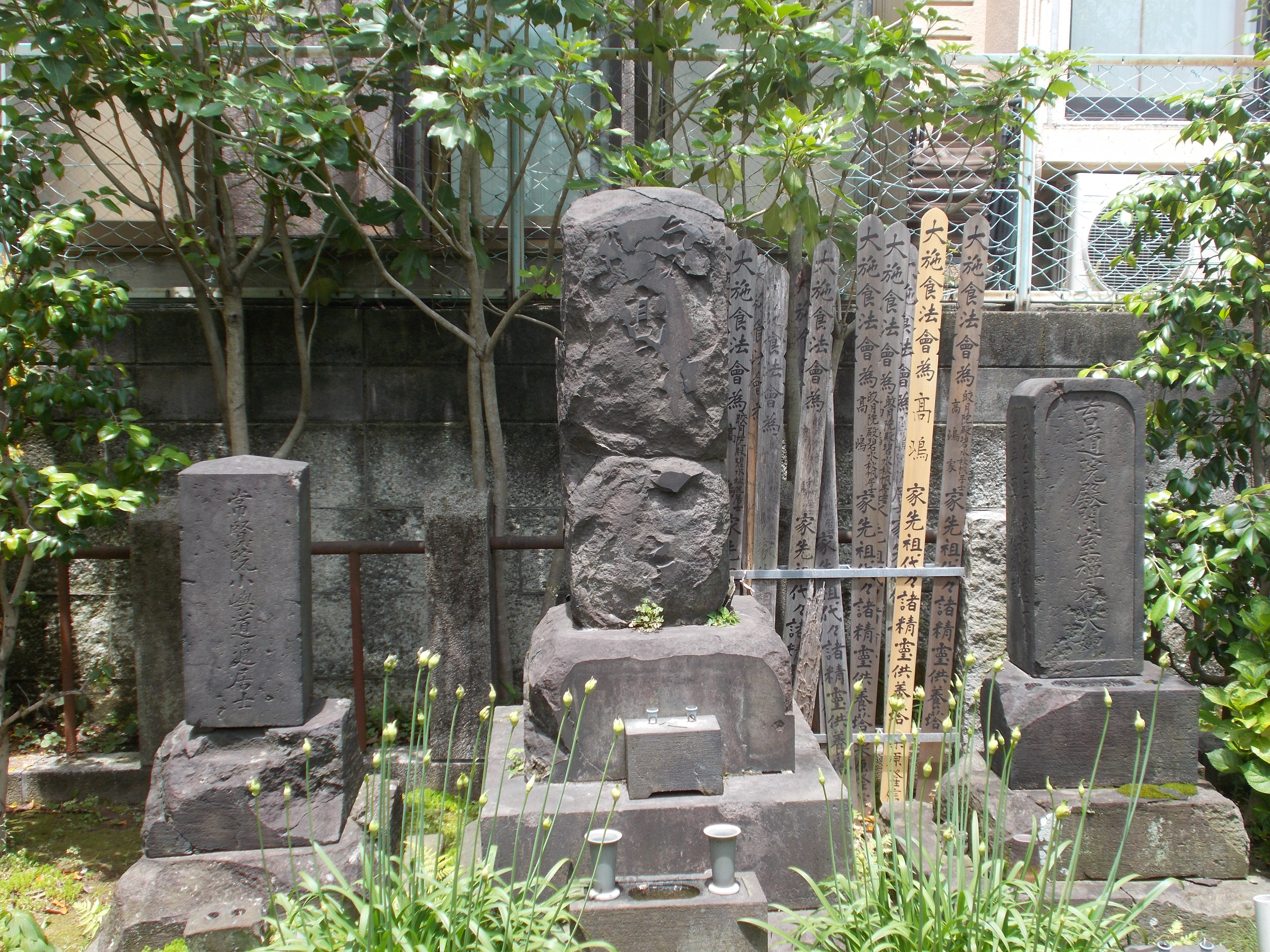
Grave of Takashima Shūhan in Daienji, Tokyo.

Takashima's school was heavily criticized by reactionary political forces within the shogunate, who opposed the introduction of Western technology and who were also fearful of the tozama feudal domains increasing in military strength. He was placed under house arrest from 1846 to 1853, but on allegations of mismanagement of the Nagasaki Kaisho and smuggling, rather than sedition or treason. Takasaki had a very strong enmity with the Nagasaki bugyō, who had always been jealous that the position was very lucrative, comparable to that of a 100,000 koku daimyō, and this was exploited by the rōjū Mizuno Tadakuni, who was concerned that Takashima's plans to manufacture bronze cannon would hinder the production of coinage which was under his purvey. Takashima was sent to Oshi Domain in Musashi Province, but returned to official favor with the arrival of the Perry Expedition in 1853, after which he became a military instructor for the shogunal forces in 1856. While under house arrest, he changed his opinion on the sakoku policy and after his release was a strong proponent for opening Japan to foreign trade.

In 1862, Takashima Shūhan recommended that Japan equip itself with 200 warships in order to repel the foreign naval threat. This led the Shogunate to authorize each domain to manufacture or purchase their own ships in order to reinforce Japan's naval capabilities.

He died in 1866 at the age of 69. His grave is at the temple of Daien-ji in Bunkyō, Tokyo, and was designated a National Historic Site in 1943.

=== Takashima Shūhan residence ===
The site of the house where Takashima Shūhan lived in Nagasaki is preserved as a National Historic Site. The main residence of the Takashima family was built in Ōmura-chō (present-day Banzai-chō) by Shuho's father, Takashima Shirobei Shigenori, but it was completely burned down in a fire in 1838, and the family subsequently lived in a villa in the current location of Higashikojima-chō. The two-story wooden villa was built in 1806 and was called "Useirō" (雨声楼). Shūhan spent 1838 to 1842 at this villa, until at the age of 60 when he was appointed as the gunnery instructor in Edo. The villa still existed when the site was designated as a historic site in 1922, but was destroyed in the atomic bombing of Nagasaki in 1945. After the war, the site was sold and the garden lost its original state, with only the stone and earthen walls, well, and stone lanterns remaining today. The site is about a 3-minute walk from the Shokakuji stop on the Nagasaki Electric Tramway from Nagasaki Station.

== See also ==
- Sakamoto Tenzan
- Rangaku
