= Kume Michikata =

- 久米 通賢
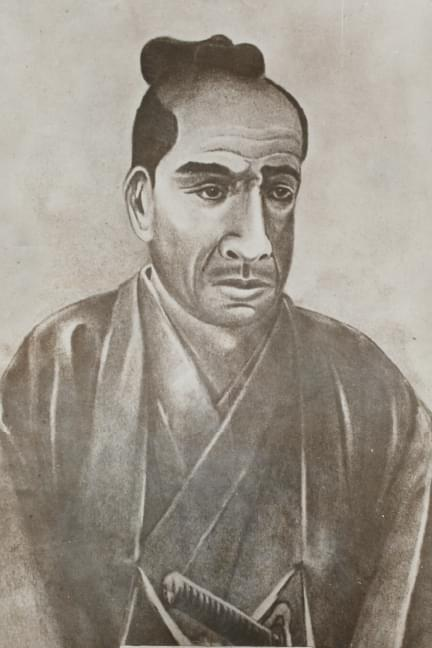

Personal details
- Born: 1780 Takamatsu Domain, Sanuki Province, Japan
- Died: June 25, 1841 (aged 60–61) Japan

Kume Eizaemon Michikata (Japanese: 久米 榮左衛門 通賢; 1780–1841) was a Japanese civil engineer, inventor, gunsmith, and scholar of rangaku.

== Biography ==
Kume Michikata was born in 1780 to a family of farmers and sailors. His father was the sea captain Kume Kahē (久米 嘉兵衛). Michikata showed exceptional intelligence and dexterity from a young age. According to one anecdote, Michikata successfully repaired a broken clock when he was only 7 years old.

In 1798, Kume travelled to Osaka where he studied astronomy under Hazama Shigetomi until 1802. In 1808 he provided assistance to the surveying team of Inō Tadataka when they visited Sanuki Province.

In 1815, Kume invented the rinsui (輪燧; lit. 'wheel ignition [device]'), a unique firing mechanism for the traditional tanegashima arquebus. The device featured a compact weatherproof pyrite firestriker and allowed an arquebus to be fired in the rain.

In the 1820s, Kume designed and led the construction of seawater evaporation ponds at Sakaide for the mass production of salt. In 1836, he retired and returned to his hometown. He also invented various other items, including a theodolite, a sextant, and matches using mercury fulminate — the first matches made in Japan. He died in 1841.

== See also ==
- Tanaka Hisashige
- Sakamoto Tenzan
