= Mahito (title) =

Noble title of ancient Japan

Mahito (真人) was one of the hereditary noble titles of ancient Japan. It was the highest in the Yakusa no kabane system of eight kabane titles.

== History ==
Mahito was the highest in the Yakusa no kabane system of eight kabane titles (the second being Ason and the third being Sukune), which was established in October 684, during the reign of Emperor Tenmu. Mahito was originally a Chinese Taoist term for hermit, shinjin, but it was read as "mahito" in the Yakusa no kabane system, and was given the descendants of the Imperial Family after Emperor Ōjin.

At the beginning of the enactment, the title was given to 13 clans, after which the number was increased to 60 clans. Later, it was given to members of the Imperial Family who were demoted to nobility.

However, during the Nara period, the kabane system was abolished, and the number of clans taking the title gradually decreased.

== See also ==
- Ason
- Sukune
- Muraji
