= Mononobe no Okoshi =

Japanese clan chief and courtier of the Kofun period

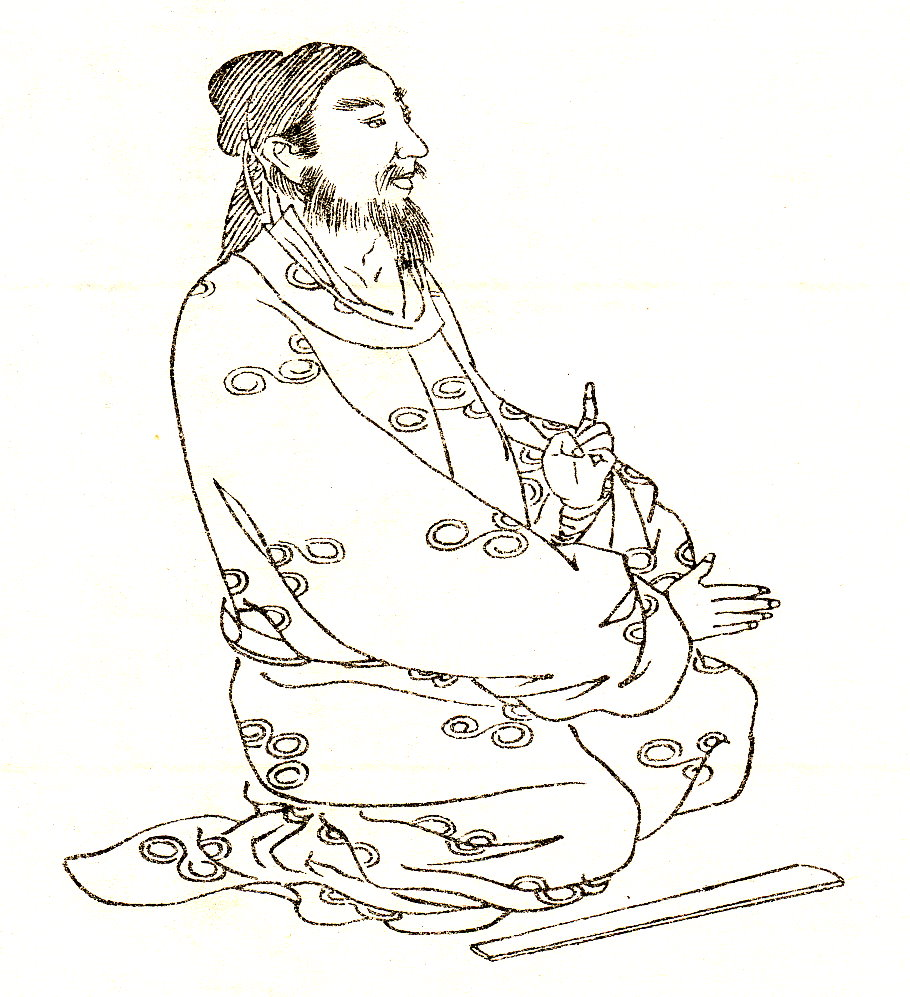
Mononobe no Okoshi, by Kikuchi Yōsai

Mononobe no Okoshi (物部 尾輿) was a Japanese statesman during the Kofun period (300-538 CE), and the chief of the Mononobe clan. He was strongly against the introduction of Buddhism to Japan. He was also against military action against the Korean kingdom of Silla, which led to Ōtomo no Kanamura's fall from power.

== Biography ==
According to the Nihon Shoki, during the reign of Emperor Ankan, a necklace belonging to Mononobe no Okoshi was stolen by the daughter of Kikoyu Ihoki (one of Mononobe's fellow muraji). Kikoyu made amends to the emperor, and Mononobe, concerned that he might be implicated in some way, donated two villages under his jurisdiction to the crown.

Mononobe was strongly against the introduction of Buddhism to Japan, and argued fiercely against it. When King Seong of Baekje sent gifts of Buddhist sutras and statues to Emperor Kinmei in 552, the emperor was faced with a political dilemma. To avoid either offending King Seong or officially sanctioning Buddhism, he gave these gifts into the keeping of Soga no Iname, head of the Soga clan and a proponent of the new religion. Mononobe was a political opponent of Soga no Iname, and successfully petitioned the emperor to impose a ruling against the Buddhist faith; he then had the Soga clan's temple burned and the Buddhist statuary destroyed.

Mononobe was also responsible for his colleague Ōtomo no Kanamura's fall from grace, when the two of them disagreed on military action against the Korean kingdom of Silla. Whilst Otomo adopted an aggressive policy towards the neighbouring kingdom, Mononobe was able to persuade Emperor Kimmei that Japan's ally Baekje would serve as an effective buffer state, and that there was no need to pursue war with Silla. As a result of his arguments, the emperor removed Ōtomo from power.
