= Hodota Kofun Cluster =

Three Kofun period burial mounds in Japan

- 保渡田古墳群 (Japanese)
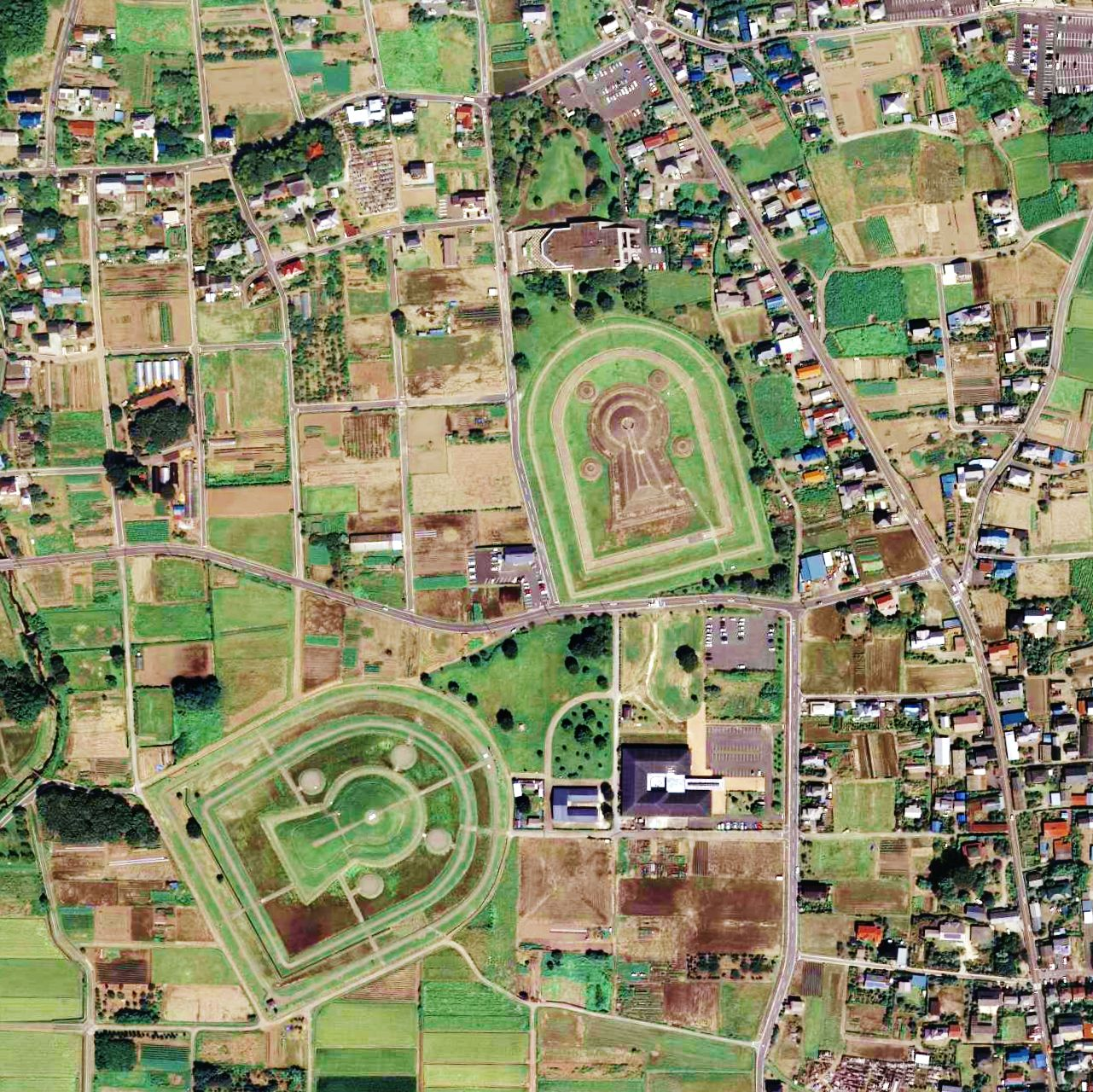
- Hodota Kofun Cluster

- Hodota Kofun Cluster Hodota Kofun Cluster (Japan)
- 36°22′51″N 138°59′09″E
- Type: kofun
- Periods: Kofun period
- Location: Takasaki, Gunma, Japan
- Region: Kantō region

History
- Built: late 6th century

Site notes
- Public access: Yes (Park)
- National Historic Site of Japan 古墳位置。

The Hodota Kofun Cluster (保渡田古墳群) is a group of three Kofun period burial mounds located in what is now the city of Takasaki, Gunma Prefecture in the northern Kantō region of Japan. It was designated a National Historic Site of Japan in 1985.

== Overview ==
This group of burial mounds is distributed at the southern foot of Mount Haruna, and were constructed from the end of the latter half of the 5th century to the first half of the 6th century AD. All are zenpō-kōen-fun (前方後円墳), which are shaped like a keyhole, having one square end and one circular end, when viewed from above. The Futakoyama Kofun is both the largest and oldest of the group and is located to the southwest. The Hachimanzuka Kofun is in the northeast, and the Yakushizuka Kofun, which is the youngest, is in the northwest. Information on excavated items and archaeological sites is displayed at the neighboring Kamitsuki-no-sato Museum of Archaeology (かみつけの里博物館, Kamitsuki-no-sato Hakubutsukan).

=== Futagoyama Kofun ===
The Futagoyama Kofun (二子山古墳) is constructed in three tiers and has an overall length of 108 meters. The bottom two tiers were covered in fukiishi and rows of cylindrical haniwa were found on top and on the terrace between the two tiers. Other types of haniwa shaped as human figures, horses and other animals, and houses, etc. were also found. The tumulus was surrounded by a double horseshoe-shaped moat, and there are four smaller empun (円墳) dome-shaped tumuli within the inner moat, flanking the posterior circular portion of the main tumulus of all sides. The burial chamber is located at the center of the apex of the circular portion of the tumulus, and consists of a river stone-lined pit-type room with a boat-shaped stone sarcophagus. The tomb has been robbed in premodern times and the lid of the sarcophagus is missing. Grave goods missed by the robbers included a decorative iron sword, gilt-bronze shoes, iron farm implements and stone imitations of everyday objects and other ornaments. Currently, the chamber is backfilled for preservation.

Overall length
108 meters
Posterior circular portion
74 meter diameter x 10 meters high
Anterior rectangular portion
71 meter width x 7 meters high

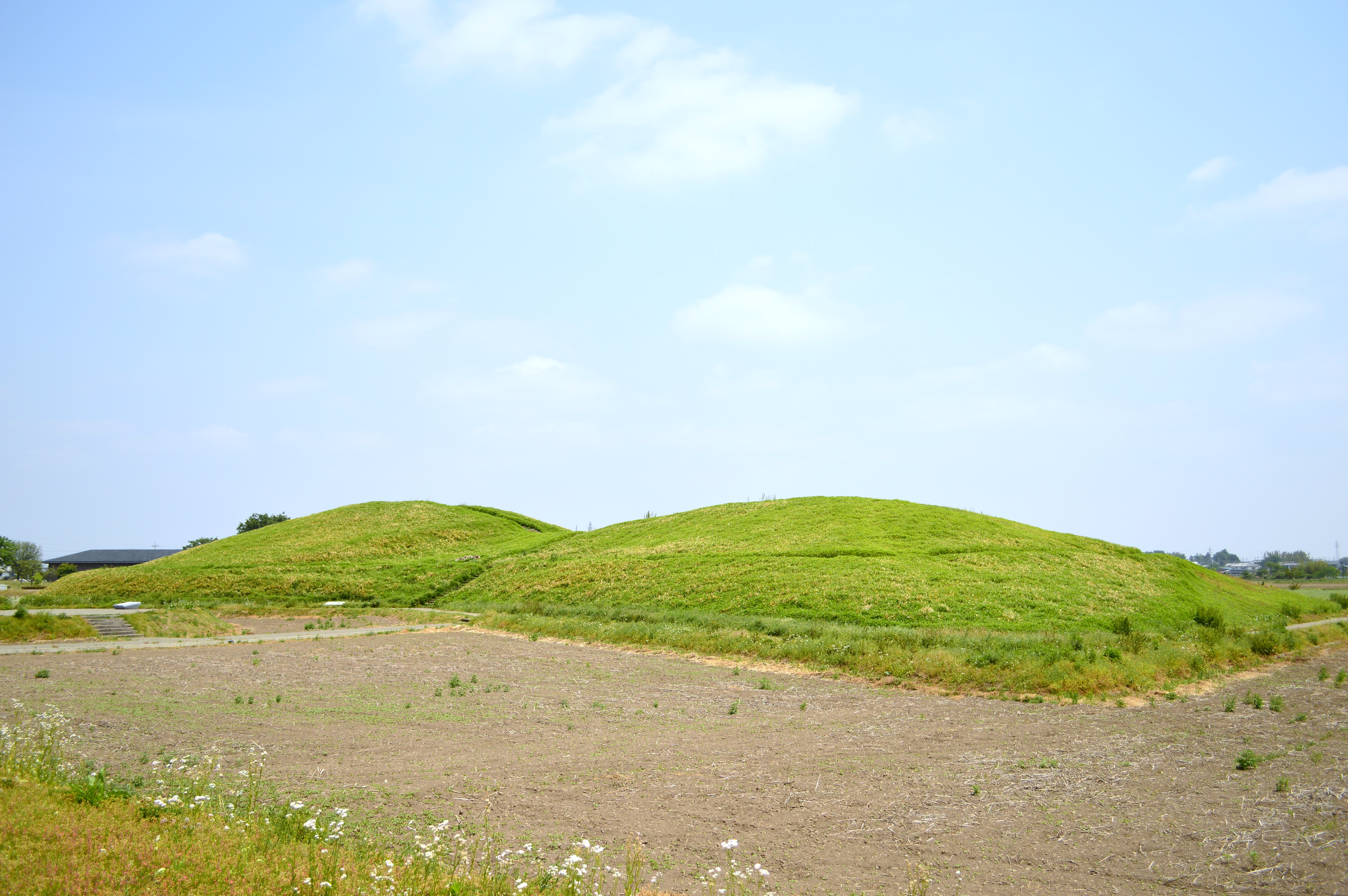
ull view of the mound景

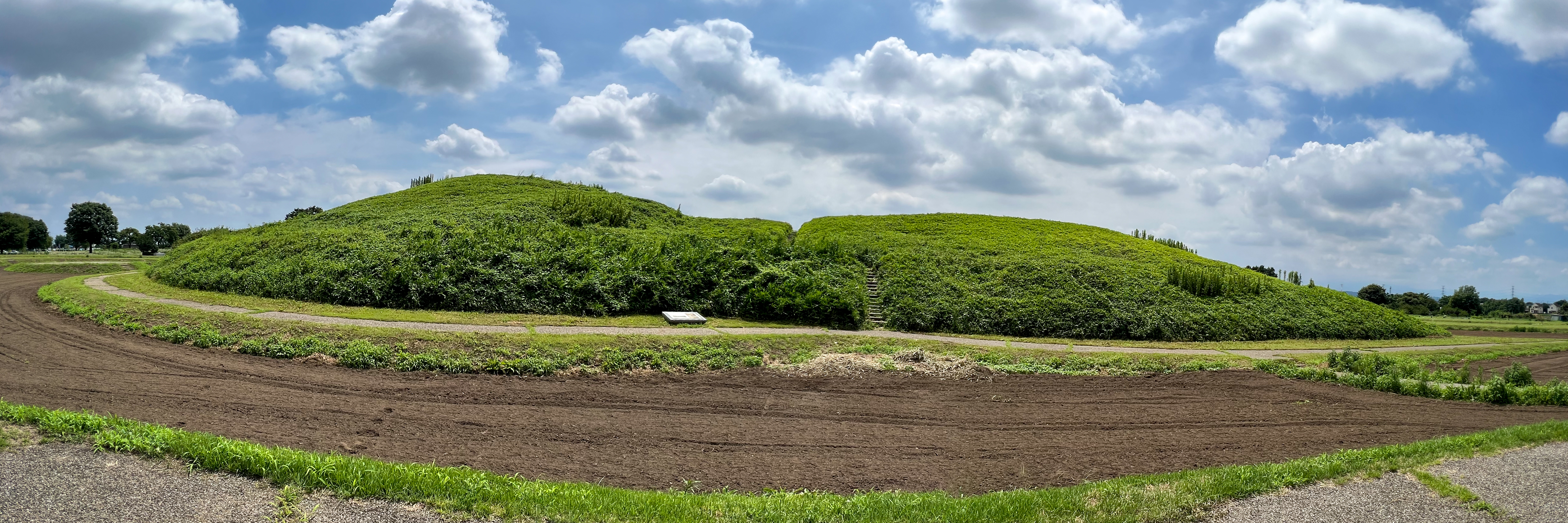
North side of the mound (rear mound on the left, front mound on the right)

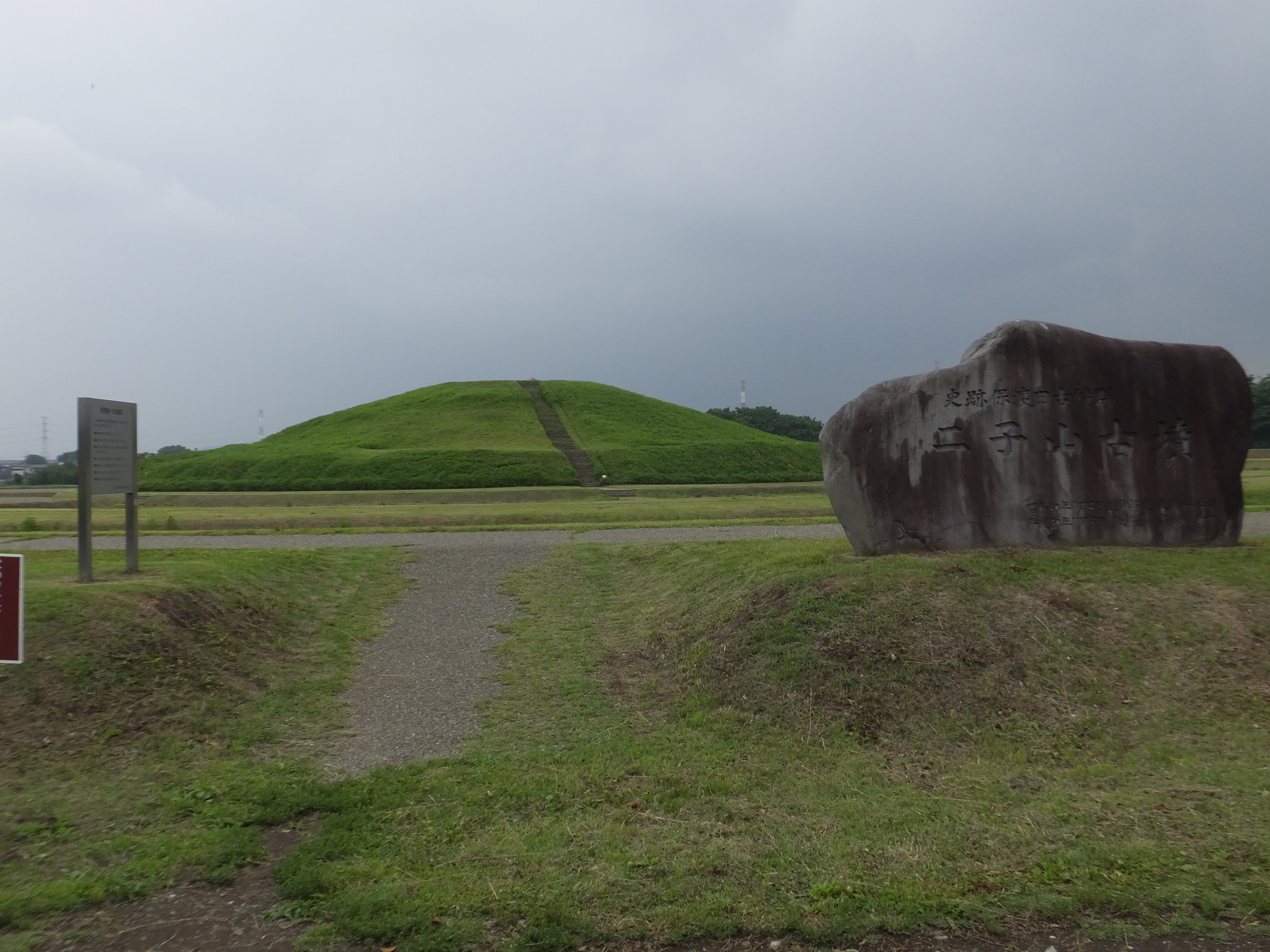
East side of the mound (rear mound)

=== Hachimanzuka Kofun ===
The Hachimanzuka Kofun (八幡塚古墳) has an overall length of 102 meters, but its original height is uncertain since the top of the tumulus has been shaved off. The mound was covered in fukiishi and rows of cylindrical haniwa were found on top. Other types of haniwa shaped as human figures, horses and other animals, and houses, etc. were also found, and of special interest was a haniwa in the shape of a cormorant with a fish in its beak. The practice of cormorant fishing was documented in the Chinese Book of Sui from the same period as the Kofun period in Japan, and this was the first physical evidence corroborating the Chinese history. The tumulus was surrounded by a double horseshoe-shaped moat, the inner dike of which also had fukiishi. As with the Futagoyama Kofun, four smaller dome-shaped tumuli are located within the inner moat, flanking the circular portion of the main tumulus of all sides. The Hachimanzuka Kofun was also robbed in antiquity, and the burial chamber has collapsed. Fragments of iron swords and other weapons, fragments of armor and shards of Sue ware pottery have been found.

Overall length
102 meters
Posterior circular portion
56 meter diameter x 6 meters high
Anterior rectangular portion
53 meter width

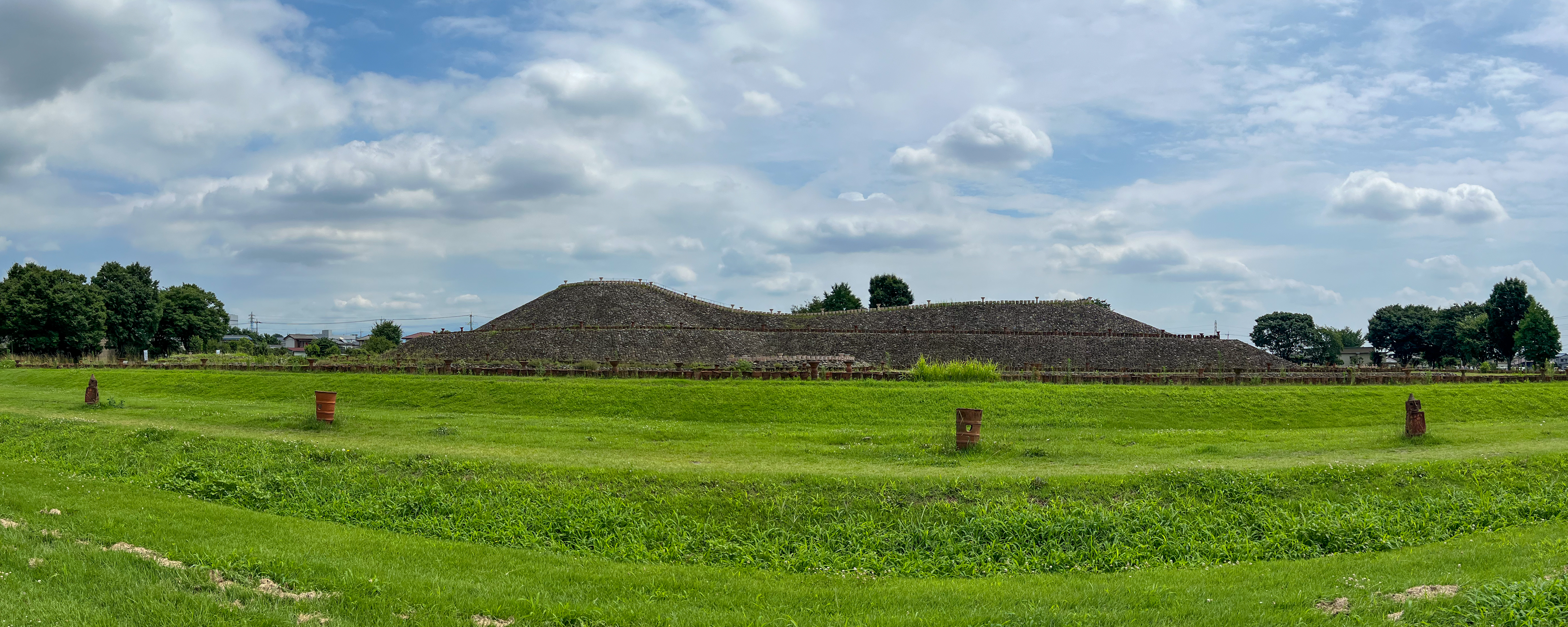
Mound (rear circular section on the left, front circular section on the right)

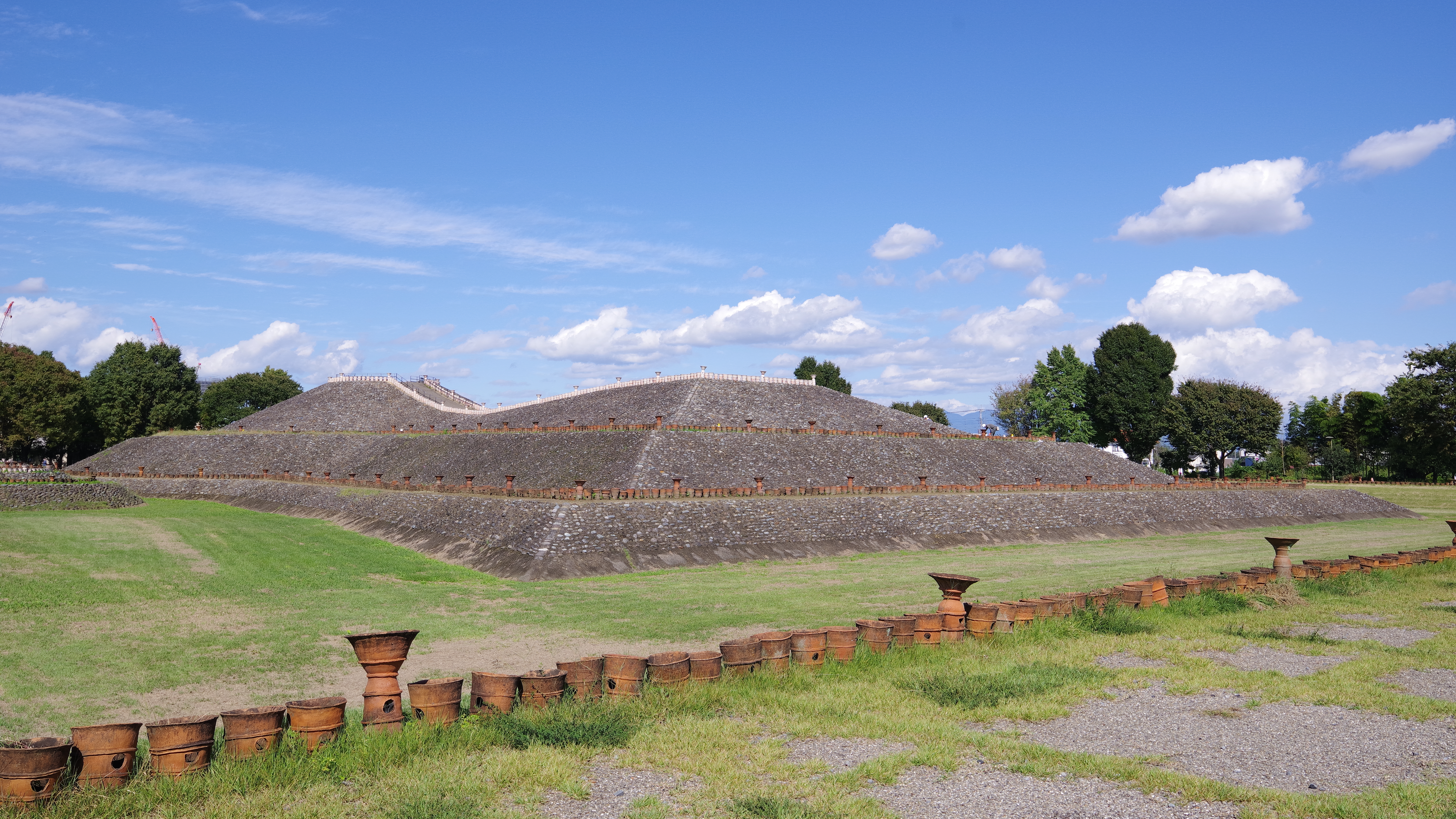
Mound (rear circular section on the left rear, front circular section on the right front)

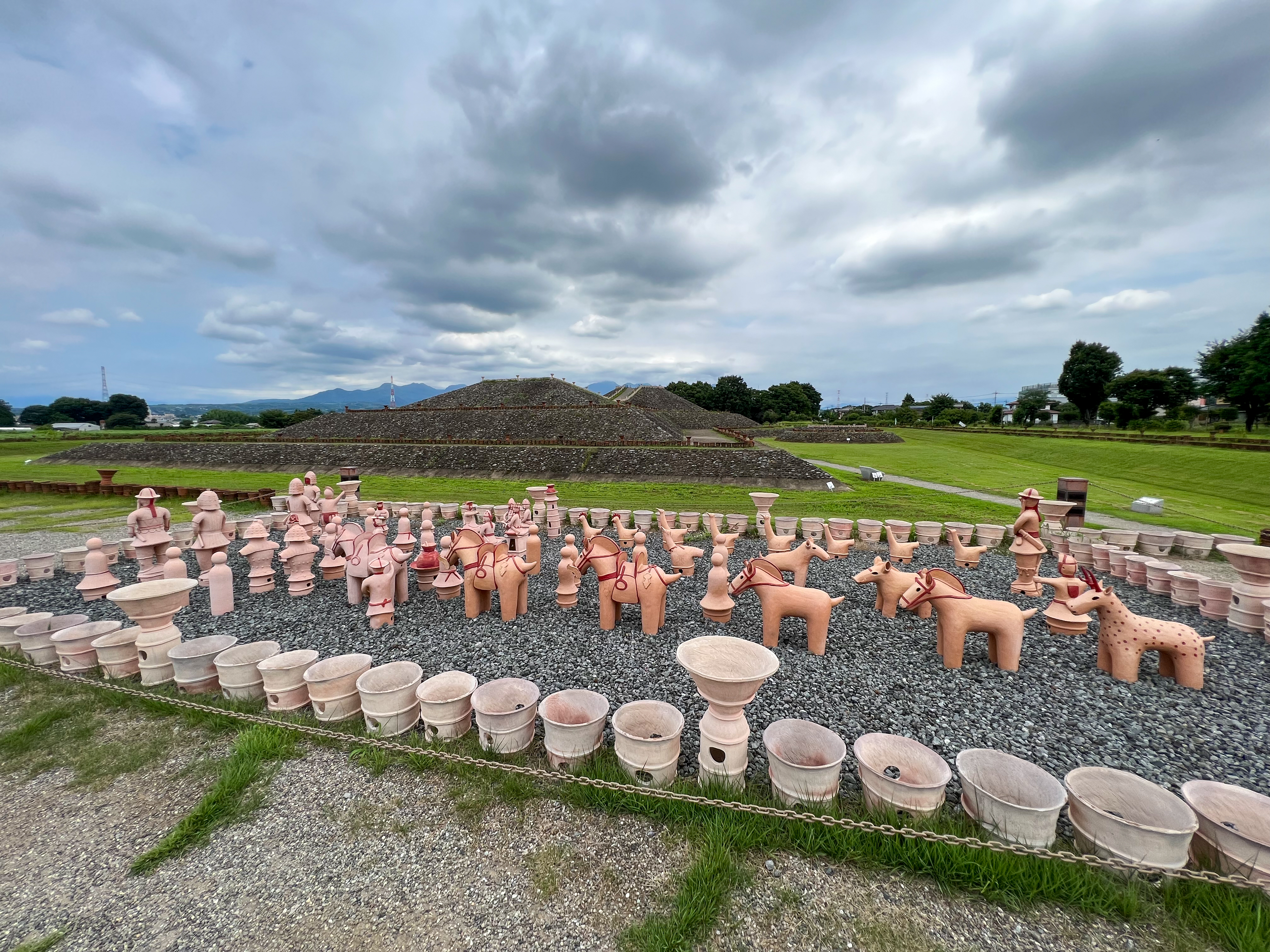
Group of human and animal haniwa figures

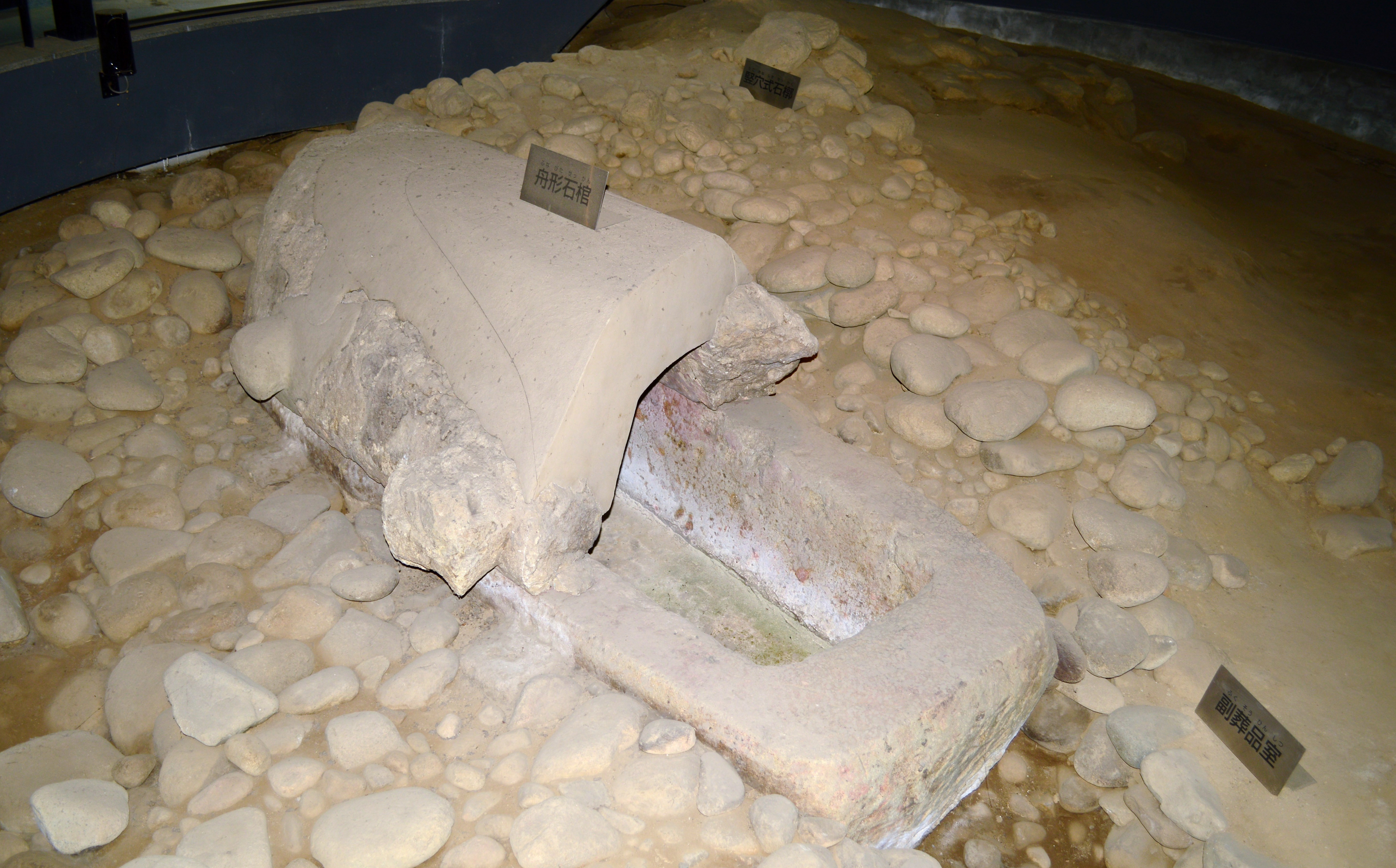
Boat-shaped stone coffin

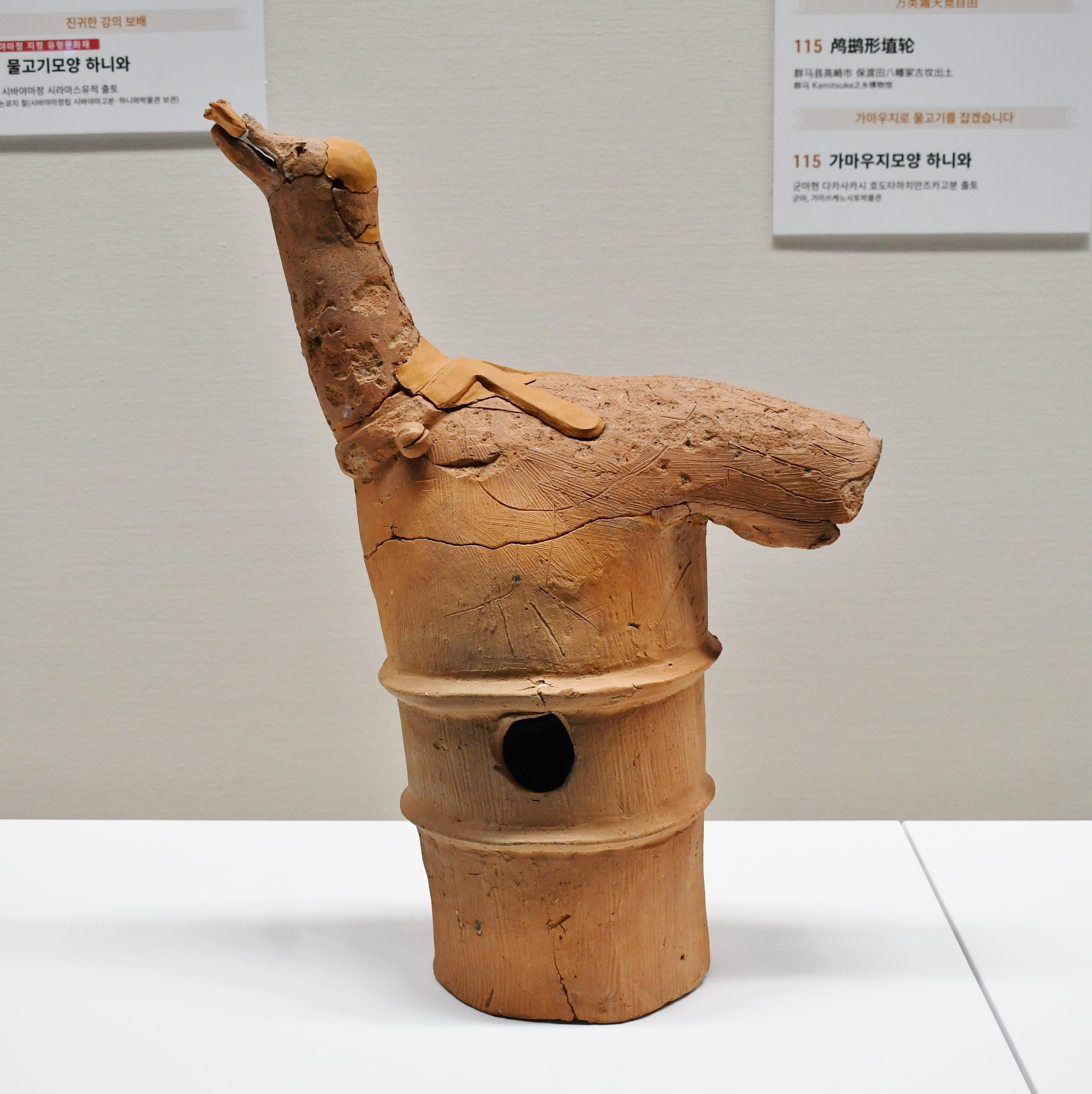
Cormorant-shaped haniwa
Owned by Kamitsuke-no-Sato Museum, photographed during a special exhibition at the Kyushu National Museum.

=== Yakushizuka Kofun ===
The Yakushizuka Kofun (薬師塚古墳) is thought to have had an overall length of over 100 meters, and to have been of two-tied construction with fukiishi and rows of cylindrical haniwa, with a double moat. However, a large portion of the tumulus was destroyed with the construction of an adjacent Buddhist temple and its graveyard. The tumulus was excavated in 1683, and the stone boat-shaped sarcophagus remains on the mound. Some of the surviving grave goods are stored at the temple of Saiko-ji, and are now Important Cultural Properties of Japan.

== Gallery ==
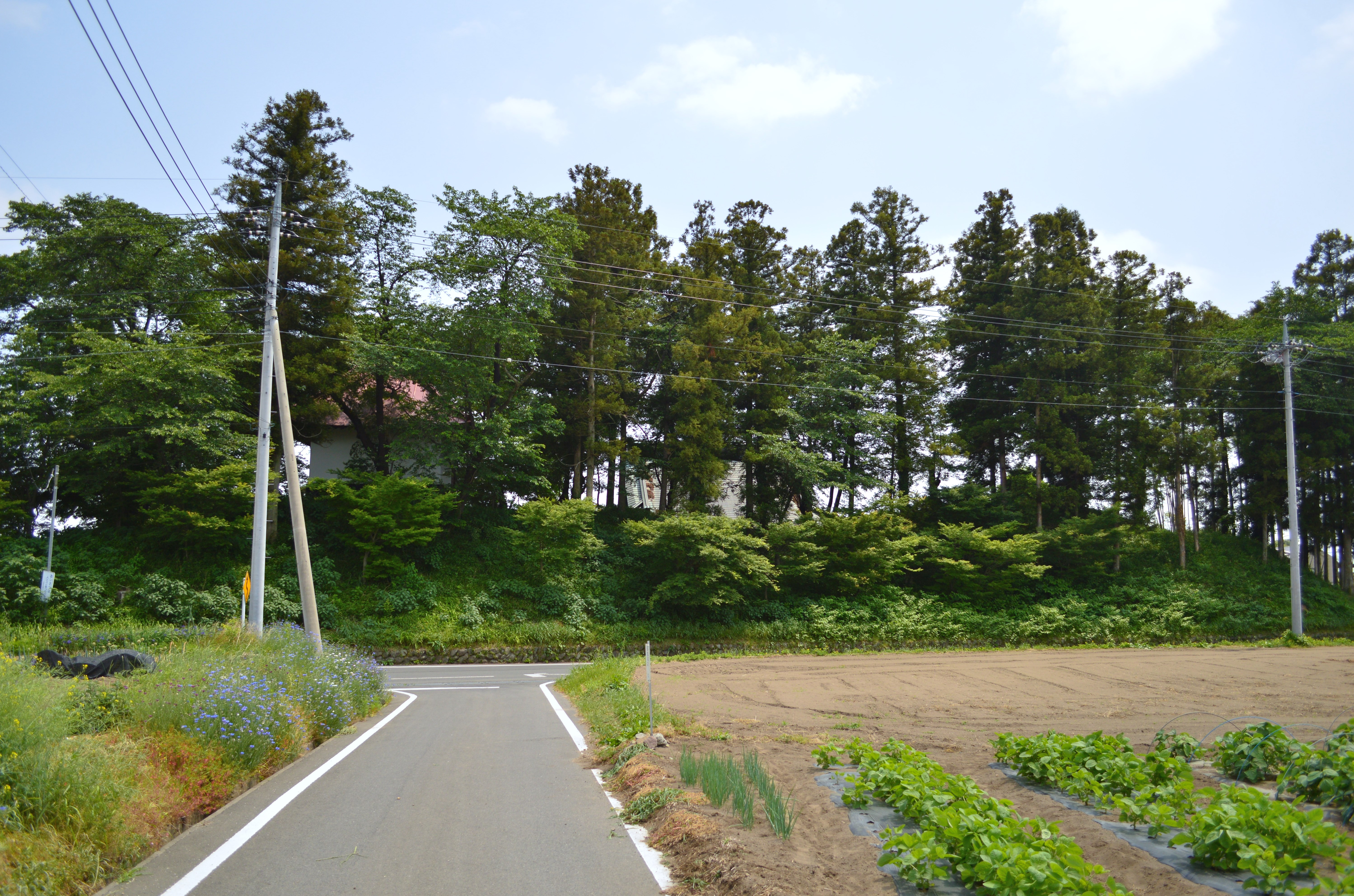
Yakushizuka Kofun

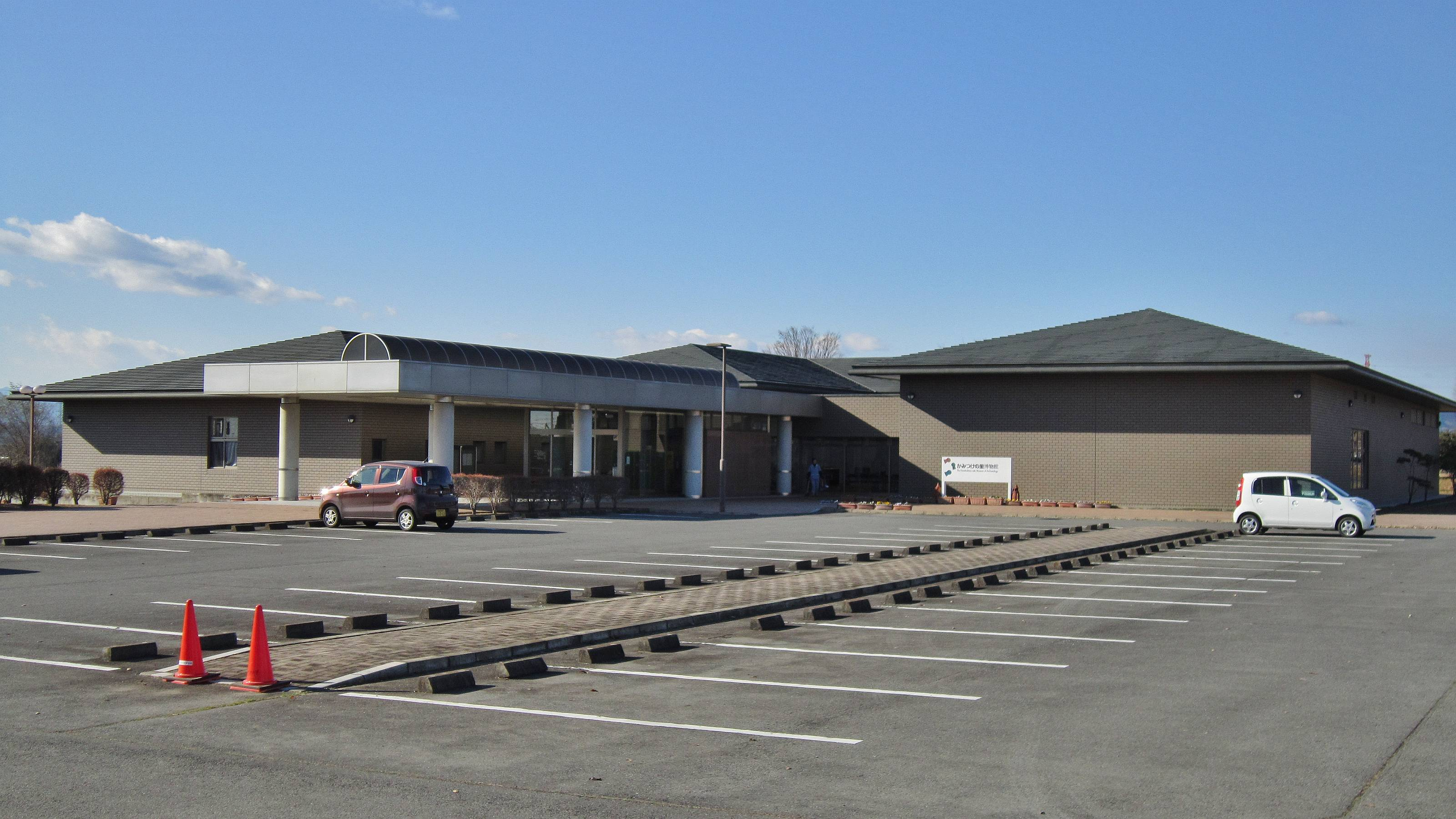
Kamitsuke-no-sato Museum of Archaeology

== See also ==
- List of Historic Sites of Japan (Gunma)
