= Iwai Rebellion =

527-8 civil conflict in Yamato Japan

- Part of the Kofun period
Date	527–528
Location	Northern Kyushu, Japan 33°23′47″N 130°33′20″E
Result	Yamato victory

Belligerents
Yamato Kingdom	Kyushu rebels Silla allies

Commanders and leaders
Mononobe no Arakabi	Iwai

Casualties and losses
Light	Heavy
- Location within Japan

The Iwai Rebellion (磐井の乱, Iwai no Ran) was a rebellion against the Yamato state that took place in Tsukushi Province, Japan (now nearby Ogōri city in Fukuoka Prefecture) in 527 AD. The rebellion was named after its leader, Iwai, who is believed by historians to have been a powerful governor of Tsukushi. The rebellion was quelled by the Yamato court, and played an important part in the consolidation of early Japan. The main record of the rebellion can be found in the Nihon Shoki, although it is also mentioned in Kojiki and other historical sources.

== Background ==
The Yamato Kingdom was formed in the central areas of Honshu in the late 3rd or early 4th century, and by 350 this state had extended its rule to the western part of Honshu and the northern part of Kyushu. On several occasions (391 and 404), Japanese troops as allies of the Paekje kingdom invaded Korea and fought against the Silla and Goguryeo kingdoms.

== Rebellion ==
At the beginning of the 6th century, the rising Silla kingdom began to threaten Japan's allies in Korea. At the same time, the kingdom of Baekje, a Japanese ally, was attacked from two sides by the kingdoms of Silla and Goguryeo, and sent 513 Confucian scholars to Yamato with a request for help. Before Yamato could send aid to Mimana and Baekje, Iwai, the governor of the Tsukushi region (semi-autonomous Kumaso region in northern Kyushu), made a treacherous alliance with the Silla kingdom, thus blocking the Yamato kingdom's attempts to send aid to Korea. This was the first recorded rebellion against the ruling imperial dynasty. Mononobe no Arakabi, the leader of a warrior clan, was sent to quell the rebellion. In 528, Iwai was overthrown and executed, and the previous autonomy of his area ended with the establishment of Daizaifu Fortress, a government military stronghold on the island of Kyushu.

== Consequences ==
Power in northern Kyushu passed into the hands of the Otomo clan, but Gaya fell to the Silla kingdom in 562.

== See also ==
- Kibi Clan Rebellion
