= Sakamoto Tenzan =

- 坂本 天山

Personal details
- Born: June 21, 1745 Takatō Domain, Shinano Province, Japan
- Died: April 20, 1803 (aged 57) Japan

Military service
- Allegiance: Takatō Domain

Sakamoto Toshiyasu (Japanese: 坂本 俊豈; 1745-1803), better known as Sakamoto Tenzan (坂本 天山), was a Japanese samurai, master of hōjutsu, and scholar of kokugaku. He established the Tenzan school (天山流, Tenzan-ryū) of gunnery.

== Biography ==
Sakamoto Tenzan was born the eldest son of Sakamoto Unshirō Hideomi (坂本 運四郎 英臣), a retainer of the Naitō clan and master of the Ogino school (荻野流, Ogino-ryū) of gunnery.

In 1767, when he was 22 years old, Sakamoto traveled to Osaka to study under the instruction of Ogino Rokubee Terukiyo (荻野 六兵衛 照清).

In 1778, Sakamoto published an advanced design for a cannon featuring a gun carriage with adjustable elevation and traverse. The cannon was called the shūhatsudai (周発台; lit. 'panoramic firing platform'). He explained the design using concepts from the Yijing.

In his later years, Sakamoto investigated measures for erosion and flood control. Earning the ire of his colleagues, he was ordered into house arrest for several years before being released. He died in 1803.

== Family ==
Sakamoto's grandson, Sakamoto Toshisada (坂本 俊貞), defended Osaka Castle from Ōshio Heihachirō's army of revolt in 1837. His granddaughter, Shimazaki Kei (島崎 桂), was the stepmother of Shimazaki Masaki, father of noted author Shimazaki Tōson.

== See also ==
- Takashima Shūhan
- Kume Michikata

== Bibliography ==
- 信濃偉人遺墨顕彰会 Shinano Ijin Iboku Kenshōkai, ed. (1933). Sakamoto Tenzan sensei ibokushū 坂本天山先生遺墨集 Posthumous Manuscripts of Sakamoto Tenzan. Japan: Published privately.
