= Sukune =

Ancient Japanese hereditary noble title

Sukune (宿禰) is one of the hereditary noble titles of ancient Japan. In the 3rd to 5th centuries, it was used as a title to represent military and administrative officers of the Yamato court.

In the 8th century, it became one of the eight kabane. It is the third highest after Mahito and Ason. It was given to the descendants of the kami (神別, shinbetsu), who held the Muraji title, such as Owari and Ōtomo clans.

== Usage ==
In the past, the kanji writing form used for Sukune was "足尼" or "足禰". The oldest-known usage of Sukune is on the ancient Inariyama Sword with the inscription "多加利足尼". In Kokuzō Hongi, a book about the genealogy of Kuni-no-Miyatsuko families, there are over 20 Yamato court officials with the Sukune title.

== Sukune and Ōne titles ==
In Kujiki, there are several cases in which the title of Sukune is given alongside the title of Ōne. It is said that during the reign of Emperor Sujin, Takeigokoro (建胆心命) was given the title of Ōne, and Tabe (多辨命) was given the title of Sukune.

== See also ==
- Ason
- Mahito
- Muraji
