= Agatanushi =

Japanese noble title

Agatanushi (県主) was the name of an ancient title of nobility in the kabane system of Yamato period Japan from the 4th through 6th century AD, before the introduction of the Ritsuryō system. The word is a combination of the kanji for nushi (主, chief) with Agata (県), a political unit smaller than a province, and the agatanushi ranked below the title of kuni no miyatsuko (国造). It is thought that the agatanushi were originally chieftains of small Kofun period tribal states which had been annexed by the Yamato state.

Per the Chinese “History of the Sui Dynasty”, (589-618), Yamato was divided into kuni (国 provinces), which were subdivided into agata (県), which were governed respectively by kuni no miyatsuko and agatanushi, who were responsible for collecting tribute. However, these offices seem to have been a confirmation of de facto local power, rather than a granting of office by the Yamato Court.
