= Mononobe clan =

Japanese aristocratic kin group

Mononobe clan 物部氏
- Parent house: Imperial House of Japan
- Titles: Various
- Founder: Mononobe no Toochone
- Final ruler: Mononobe no Moriya
- Dissolution: 587
- Ruled until: 587, Battle at Mount Shigi
- Cadet branches: Isonokami clan

The Mononobe clan (物部氏, Mononobe uji) was a Japanese aristocratic kin group (uji) of the Kofun period, known for its military opposition to the Soga clan. The Mononobe were opposed to the spread of Buddhism, partly on religious grounds, claiming that the local deities would be offended by the worshiping of foreign deities, but also as the result of feelings of conservatism. The Nakatomi clan, ancestors of the Fujiwara, were also Shinto ritualists allied with the Mononobe in opposition to Buddhism.

The Mononobe, like many other major families of the time, were something of a corporation or guild in addition to being a proper family by blood-relation. While the only members of the clan to appear in any significant way in the historical record were statesmen, the clan as a whole was known as the Corporation of Arms or Armorers.

== History ==
The Mononobe were said to have been descended from Nigihayahi no Mikoto, (饒速日命), a legendary figure who is said to have ruled Yamato before the conquest of Emperor Jimmu. His descendant Mononobe no Toochine (物部十千根), known as the founder of the clan, was given Isonokami Shrine by Yamatohime-no-mikoto, the daughter of Emperor Suinin. He then began using the name Mononobe.

In the 6th century, a number of violent clashes erupted between the Mononobe and the Soga clan. According to the Nihon Shoki, one particularly important conflict occurred after the Emperor Yōmei died after a very short reign. Mononobe no Moriya, the head of the clan, supported one prince to succeed Yōmei, while Soga no Umako chose another. The conflict came to a head in a battle at Kisuri (present-day Osaka) in the year 587, where the Mononobe clan were defeated and crushed at the Battle of Shigisan. Following Moriya's death, Buddhism saw a further spread in Japan. (Note: Read more in the article on Mononobe no Moriya for recent findings on a possible sponsorship for Buddhism by the Mononobe.)

In 686, the Mononobe reformed as the Isonokami clan, named thus due to their close ties with Isonokami Shrine, a Shinto shrine which doubled as an imperial armory.

== Family Tree ==
Nigihayahi-no-mikoto (饒速日命), legendary figure who is said to have ruled Yamato before the conquest of Emperor Jimmu.
 　┃
Umashimaji-no-mikoto (宇摩志麻遅命)
 　┇
(5 generations missing)
 　┇
Mononobe no Tōchine (物部十千根), known as the founder of the clan.
 　┃
Mononobe no Ikui (物部胆咋)
 　┃
Ikoto (物部五十琴)
 　┣━━━━━━━━━━━━━━━━━━━━━━━━━━━━━━━━━━━━━━━━━━━━━━━━━━━━━━━━━━━━━━━━━━━━━━━━━━━━━┳━━━━━━━━━━━━━━━━━━━━━━━━━━━━━━━━━━━━━━┓
Ikofutsu (物部伊莒弗)                                                        Mukiri (麦入)                          Iwamochi (石持)
 　┣━━━━━━━━━━━━━━━━━━━━━━━┳━━━━━━━━━━━━━━━━━━━━━━┓                              ┣━━━━━━━━━━━━━━━━━━┓                   ┃
Me (目)           Futsukuru (布都久留)        Makura (真椋)                     Oomae (大前)  Omae (小前)             Ushiro (菟代)
 　┃
Arayama (荒山)
 　┃
Okoshi (尾輿)
 　┣━━━━━━━━━━━━━━━━━━━━━━━━━━━━━━━━┳━━━━━━━━━━━━━━━━━━━━━━━━━━━━━━━━━┓
Mikari (御狩)                  Moriya (守屋)                     Nieko (贄子), his daughter married Soga no Umako
 　┃
Me (目)
 　┃
Umaro (宇麻呂)
 　┃
Isonokami no Maro (石上麻呂), changed his surname and founded the Isonokami clan (石上氏)

Descendants of Mononobe no Futsukuru (物部布都久留), see above tree.

Futsukuru (布都久留)
 　┣━━━━━━━━━━━━━━━━━━━━━━━━━━━━━━━━━━━━━━━━━━━━┓
Itabi (木蓮子)                              Ogoto (小事)
 　┣━━━━━━━━━━━━━━━━━━━━━━━━━━━━━━━━━━━━━━━━━━━━┓
Masara (麻佐良)                 Yakahime (宅媛), consort of Emperor Ankan
 　┃
Arakabi (麁鹿火)
 　┣━━━━━━━━━━━━━━━━━━━━━━━━━━━━━━━━━━━━━━━━━━━━┓
Iwayumi (石弓)                           Kagehime (影媛)

== See also ==
- Isonokami no Maro
- Kujiki
- Mononobe-jinja
- Mononobe no Arakabi
- Mononobe no Moriya
- Mononobe no Okoshi
