= Mononobe no Arakabi =

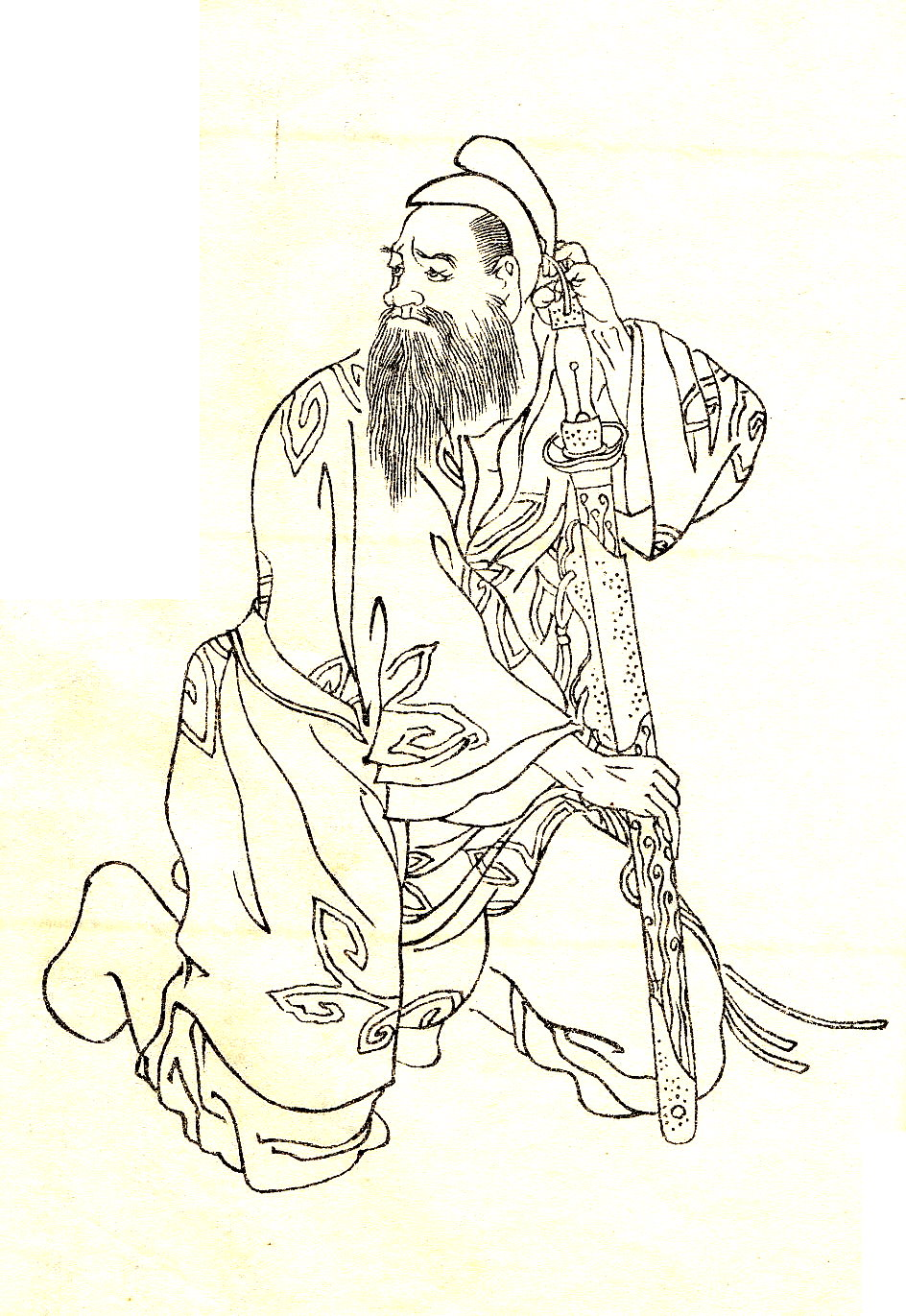
Mononobe no Arakabi by Kikuchi Yōsai

Mononobe no Arakabi (物部 麁鹿火, died 536) was a government minister during the Kofun period of ancient Japanese history.

== Life ==
In 512, the king of the Korean kingdom of Baekje (called Kudara by the Japanese) requested to take control of four districts of the land of the Gaya confederacy (known to the Japanese as Mimana). Arakabi was ordered by Emperor Keitai to report the emperor's consent, but at the advice of his wife feigned illness and claimed to be unable to make the journey. The legendary Japanese warrior queen Empress Jingū was said to have conquered these lands for the Yamato state some centuries earlier (around the years 200–300 CE), and Arakabi and his wife took this as a sign that the kami wished for these lands to be in Japanese hands.

As minister, Arakabi led expeditions to fight off outside peoples, and also to repress the revolts of various rebellious elements within the Yamato state, such as Iwai, the governor of Tsukushi, whose revolt was repressed in 527.

== See also ==
- Takaoka clan
