= Kuni no miyatsuko =

Officials in ancient Japan during the Yamato period

Kuni no miyatsuko (国造), also read as kokuzō or kunitsuko, were officials in ancient Japan during the Yamato period who governed provinces called kuni.

== Yamato period ==
Kuni no miyatsuko governed provinces called kuni (国), although the location, names, and borders of the provinces remain unclear. Kuni no miyatsuko were appointed by and remained under the jurisdiction of the Yamato Court, but over time the position became hereditary. Kuni no miyatsuko carried kabane titles bestowed by the Yamato Court, commonly kimi (君) or atae (直). Prestigious kuni no miyatsuko held the title of omi (臣).

== Taika Reforms ==
The office of kuni no miyatsuko was abolished in the Taika Reforms in 645 and the former administrative kuni (provinces) were formally reorganized under the Ritsuryō system. The provinces became ruled by new officials called kuni no mikotomochi, or more commonly, kokushi. The kuni no miyatsuko continued to be appointed after the Taika Reforms, generally to the office of gunji (郡司). Gunji were appointed from powerful regional kuni no miyatsuko families, for life, and the position became hereditary. The kuni no miyatsuko were now in charge of spiritual and religious affairs, specifically the Shintō rites of each province. These religious officials became known as shin-kokuzō (新国造), or "new" kuni no miyatsuko. The kuni no miyatsuko, now in the office of gunji, often sided with peasants against the ruling kokushi elite. The gunji position, however, was abolished with the establishment of the manorial shōen system in the early Heian period. A few kuni no miyatsuko clans retained influence after the Taika Reforms, such as the Izumo no Kuni no Miyatsuko (出雲国造) of Izumo Province in present-day eastern Shimane Prefecture.
