= Muraji =

Hereditary title in ancient Japan

Muraji (連) (from Old Japanese: muraⁿzi < *mura-nusi "village master") was an ancient Japanese hereditary title denoting rank and political standing (a kabane) that was reserved for the most powerful among the Tomo no Miyatsuko clans, which were clans associated with particular occupations. The muraji rivaled the rank of omi in political power and standing during much of the Kofun period and were frequently in conflict with them over political issues such as whether Buddhism should be accepted and issues of imperial succession. By tradition, the muraji clans claimed descent from mythological gods (神別氏族, shinbetsu shizoku) and included such clans as the Ōtomo (大伴), the Nakatomi (中臣), the Mononobe (物部), and the Inbe (忌部).

Like the omi, the most powerful muraji added the prefix Ō (大) to muraji and were referred to as Ōmuraji (大連). Examples of Ōmuraji mentioned in the Nihon Shoki included Mononobe no Ikofutsu (物部伊莒弗) during the reign of Emperor Richū, Ōtomo no Muroya (大伴室屋), Ōtomo no Kanamura (大伴金村), Mononobe no Me (物部目), Mononobe no Arakabi (物部麁鹿火), Mononobe no Okoshi (物部尾輿) and Mononobe no Moriya (物部守屋).

When the kabane system was reformed into the eight kabane system in 684, a few of the powerful muraji of the time were given the kabane of ason, which ranked second under the new system, but most were given the kabane of sukune, which ranked third. Muraji itself was dropped to seventh in rank.

== List of Ō-muraji (大連) ==
- Mononobe no Toochine (物部十千根)
- Mononobe no Ikofutsu (物部伊莒弗), great-grandson of Toochone
- Ōtomo no Muroya (大伴室屋)
- Mononobe no Me (物部目), son of Ikofutsu
- Ōtomo no Kanamura (大伴金村), grandson of Muroya
- Mononobe no Itabi (物部木蓮子), grandson of Ikofutsu
- Mononobe no Arakabi (物部 麁鹿火), grandson of Itabi (died 536)
- Mononobe no Okoshi (物部 尾輿), grandson of Me
- Mononobe no Nieko (物部 贄子), son of Okoshi
- Mononobe no Moriya (物部 守屋), son of Okoshi (died 587)
