= Ason =

Japanese hereditary noble title

Ason (朝臣, Ason, Asomi) was a hereditary noble title in Japan, used mainly between the Asuka and Heian periods. At first, it was the second highest, below Mahito, which was given to members of the Imperial family, but after the Heian period it became the highest of the eight noble titles: Ason, Mahito, Sukune, Imiki, Michinoshi, Omi, Muraji, and Inagi.

== History ==
The title was created as a part of the eight-kabane system, proclaimed in 684 during Emperor Tenmu's reign, as its second highest rank. As such, Asomi was initially given to the highest-ranked noble clans whose genealogical origins were often claimed back to imperial princes.

Although the clans closest to the Imperial House, that is, descendants of Emperor Keitai, were intended to be promoted to Mahito, the first rank in the original eight kabane system, this fell out of favor with the nobility. In 802, Prince Yasuyo, a son of Emperor Kammu was designated Yoshimine no Ason Yasuyo, an indication that he had renounced his imperial status and became a member of the peerage. Since the Heian period, Ason became the highest of the eight kabane, and began to be used by imperial princes and their descendants.

Eventually, all families with aristocratic lineage bore the title of Ason, and the other titles fell out of favor, with Ason simply indicating a person's social status.

== Notable holders ==
Notable Ason were:

- Fujiwara no Ason, awarded by Emperor Tenji to Nakatomi no Kamatari in 668; the origin of the Fujiwara clan
- Minamoto no Ason, first awarded to his non-heir sons by Emperor Saga (786–842); the origin of the Minamoto clan
- Taira no Ason, awarded to his grandson by Emperor Kammu (737–806); see also Taira clan

Notable holders of Ason were:

- Kakinomoto no Ason Hitomaro, poet (c. 662–710)
- Isonokami no Ason Maro, statesman, possibly buried in Takamatsuzuka Tomb (640–717)
- Kasa no Ason Maro, poet better known as Sami Mansei (fl. 720)
- Ariwara no Narihira Ason, poet (825–880)
- Miyamoto no Kintada Ason, poet (889–948)
- Fujiwara no Toshiyuki Ason, poet (fl. 900)
- Onakatomi no Yoshinobu Ason, poet (921–991)
- Minamoto no Muneyuki Ason, poet (d. 983)
- Fujiwara no Ason Sadaie, poet and scholar (1162–1241)
- Taiganin den Taira no Ason Iga no Kami Raiodo Hon Daikoji, founder of Tenshin Shōden Katori Shintō-ryū (1387–1488)

== See also ==
- Sukune
- Mahito
- Muraji
