= Kabane =

Japanese hereditary noble titles

Kabane (姓) were Japanese hereditary noble titles. Their use traces back to ancient times when they began to be used as titles signifying a family's political and social caste.

== History ==
At first, the kabane were administered by individual clans, but eventually they came to be controlled by the Yamato imperial court. As the court's national unification efforts progressed, a kabane was given to the most powerful families, which gradually became a hereditary noble title, and new ones were created. There were almost thirty of them in number. Some of the more common kabane were Omi (臣), Muraji (連), Sukune (宿禰), Kuni no miyatsuko (国造), Kimi (君; or 公), Atai (直), Fubito (史), Agatanushi (県主), and Suguri (村主).

Descendants of the Imperial House of Japan (皇別, kōbetsu) were given Omi and the descendants of the gods (神別, shinbetsu) were given Muraji. Of these, the most influential families were given Ōomi and Ōmuraji.

The imperial House of Yamato became the most powerful family in the kabane system, although during the 6th century AD, a number of other leaders, often with high ranks of Omi and Muraji, sometimes overshadowed the Yamato rulers. This power dynamic became one of the incentives of the Taika Reform in 684.

During this reform, the kabane was no longer tied to a specific occupation or political position, but simply began to signify a family's aristocratic lineage and social status. The existing kabane were also reorganized into an eight kabane system (八色の姓, yakusa no kabane) consisting of Mahito, Ason, Sukune, Imiki (忌寸), Michinoshi (道師), Omi, Muraji, Inagi (稲置). The powerful Omi of the time were given the kabane of Ason, which ranked second under the new system, while most of the Muraji were given the kabane of Sukune, which ranked third.

Later, as the clans began to devolve into individual households, the kabane system gradually faded from use.

== Name ==
It is generally believed that the name kabane (姓) either derived from the word "agamena" (崇名), or alternatively from the word "kyöröi" (骨), meaning "family" in Old Korean.
