= Omi Shrine =

Shinto shrine in Ōtsu, Japan

Omi Shrine 近江神宮 (Omi Jingu)
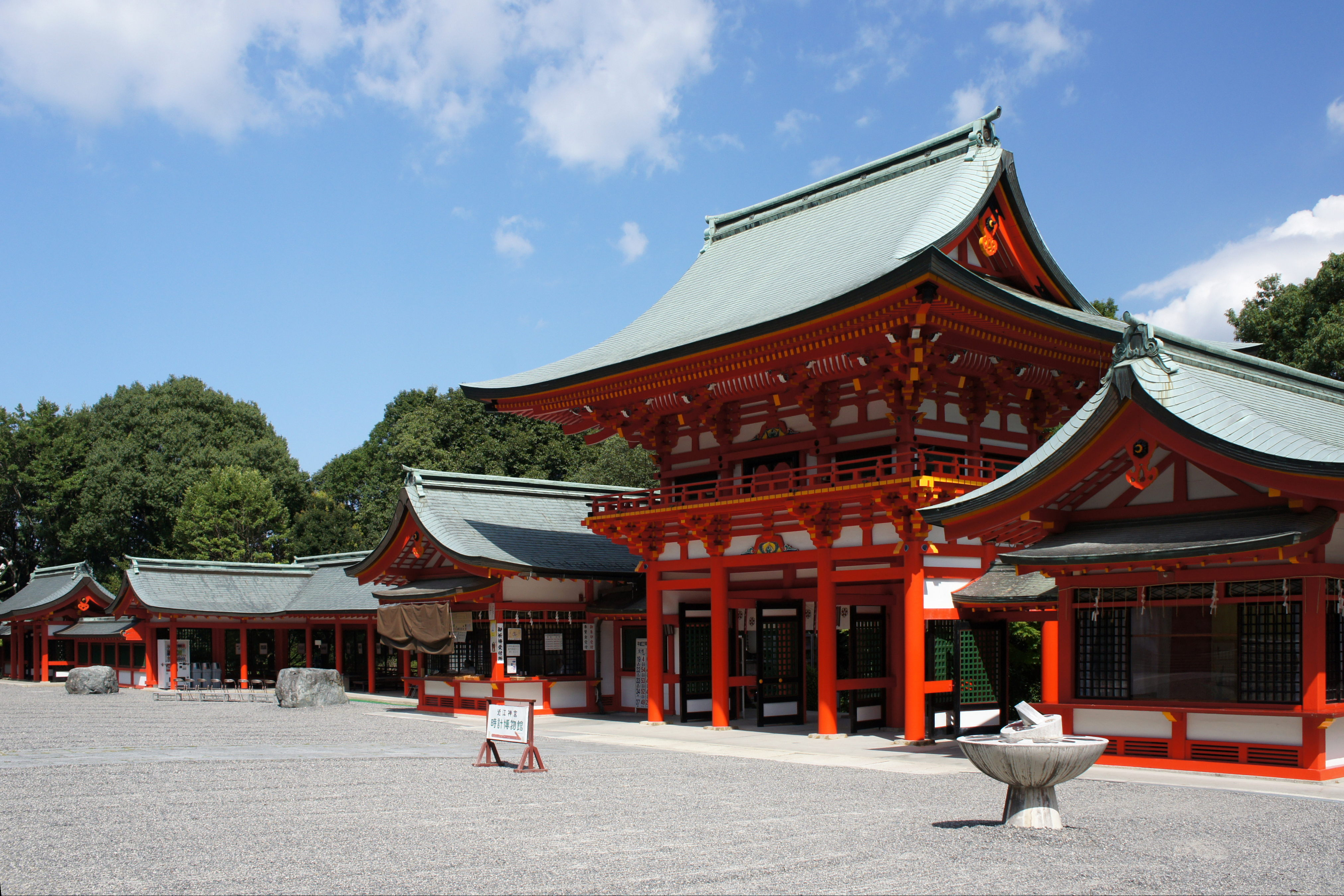
- Rōmon

- Location within Japan

Religion
- Affiliation: Shinto
- Deity: Emperor Tenji
- Festival: Reitaisai (April 20th)
- Type: Former kanpeitaisha Chokusaisha; Beppyo jinja

Location
- Location: 1-1, Jingu-cho, Otsu-shi, Shiga Prefecture, JAPAN, 314-0031
- Interactive map of Omi Shrine 近江神宮 (Omi Jingu)
- Coordinates: 35°01′56.8″N 135°51′04.4″E

Architecture
- Style: Omi-zukuri
- Established: 1940

Website
- oumijingu.org

Omi Jingu (近江神宮, Ōmi Jingū) or Omi Shrine is a Jingū Shinto shrine in Ōtsu, a city in Shiga Prefecture, Japan. It was constructed in 1940 and is dedicated to Emperor Tenji. It was formerly an imperial shrine of the first rank (官幣大社, kanpei taisha) in the Modern system of ranked Shinto Shrines.

The shrine is located near Ōmijingūmae Station.

== History ==
The shrine is dedicated to Emperor Tenji (626–671), the 38th emperor of Japan. Emperor Tenji carried out the Taika Reforms and aimed to complete the reform in the capital city, which was located on the west bank of Lake Biwa. He moved the Japanese capital from Asuka to Ōtsu in 667. Emperor Tenji also presided over the establishment of the first rōkoku, or Japanese water clock system, which was installed in 671.

The proposal for this shrine to Emperor Tenji was first considered by Japanese Diet in 1908. The construction of the shrine started in 1937 and was finished by November 7, 1940.

== Layout and design ==
The shrine is surrounded by a large forest. Its main gate and buildings are painted red. The complex is located near the Ōmi Ōtsu Palace.

Omi shrine pavilions were constructed by a method of Omi-zukuri, and it is listed in the Registered Tangible Cultural Properties of Japan.

There are a multitude of facilities within the precinct of the shrine, including Ichi-no-Torii (一の鳥居: First gate), Ni-no-Torii (二の鳥居: Second gate), Syagō Hyō (社号標: Stone pillar on which shrine name is engraved), Temizusha (手水舎: Purification font), Yuisho Kōsatsu (由緒高札: Official bulletin board about the origin), Rōmon (楼門: Tower gate), Ge-haiden (外拝殿: Outer Haiden), Nai-haiden (内拝殿: Inner Haiden), Honden (本殿: Main hall), Kaguraden (神座殿: Hall for a sacred symbol), Tokeikan Hobutsukan (時計館宝物館: Treasure hall of clock museum), Hidokei (日時計: a sun-dial), Rokoku (漏刻: water clock ), Kodai Hidokei (古代火時計: Ancient fire clock), Jidosya Kiyoharae-sho (自動車清祓所: Purification place for cars), Seishō Yōhaiden (栖松遙拝殿: The hall to worship kami from afar), Karuta gaku (かるた額: Frame for karuta), Haraedo (also known as 'harae-dokoro,' or 'harae-dono')(祓所: a site where harae is performed), Komorebi no Michi (木洩れ日の道: The road of sunlight filtering through trees ), Tokei Gakko (時計学校: The clock School), Omi Kangakukan (近江勧学館: Omi school), and Zen-an (善庵).

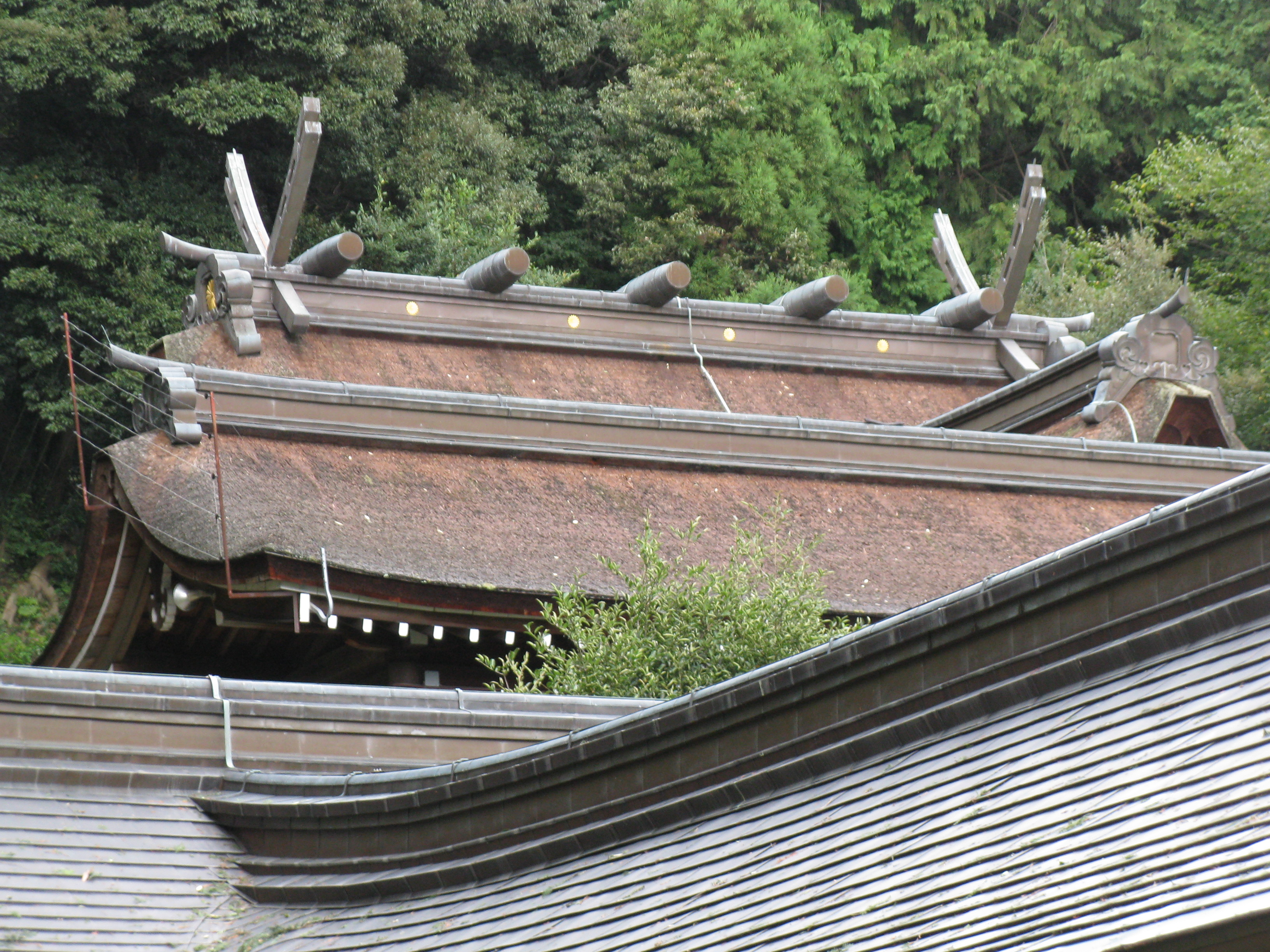
Honden (本殿: Main hall)

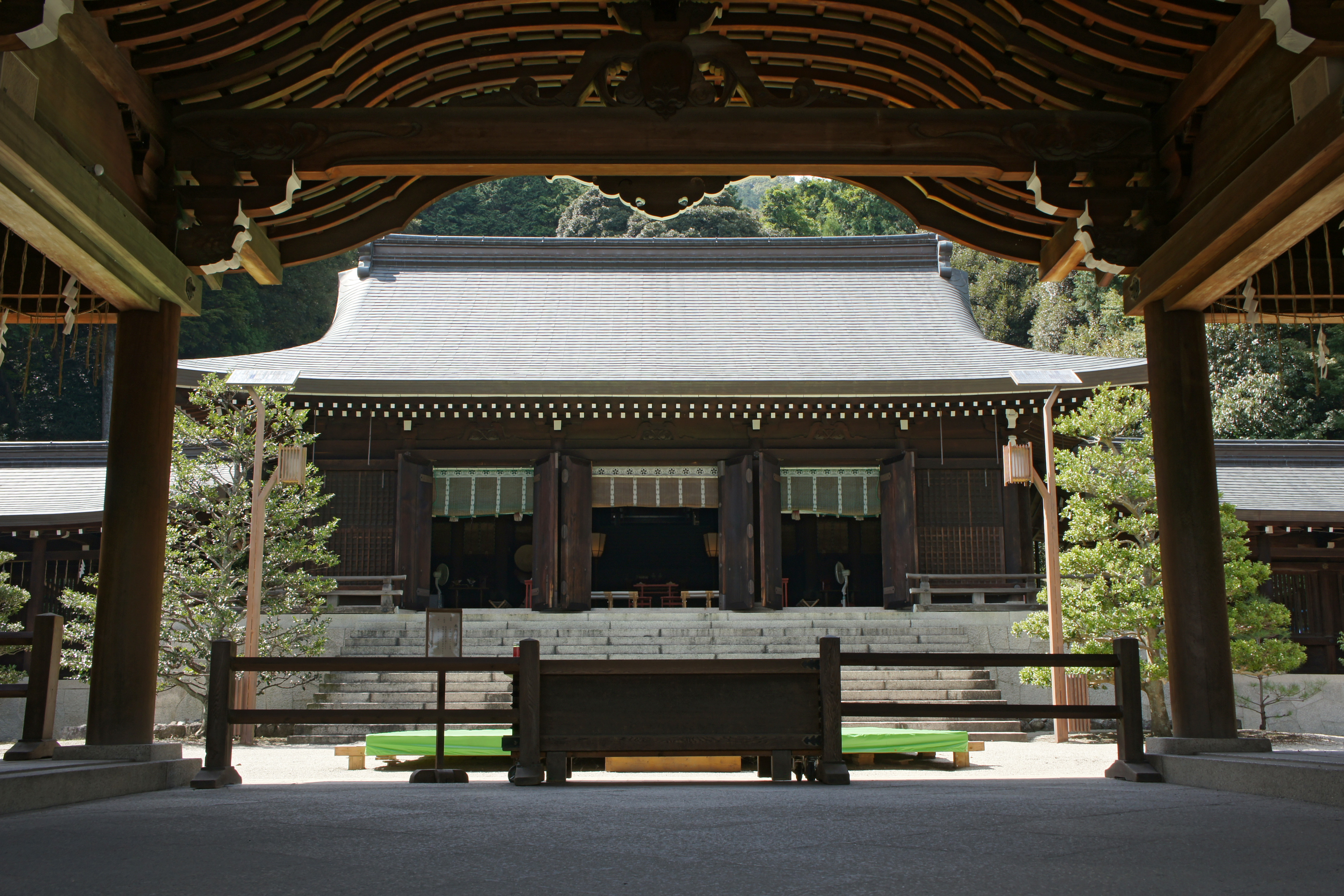
Naihaiden (内拝殿: Inner Haiden)

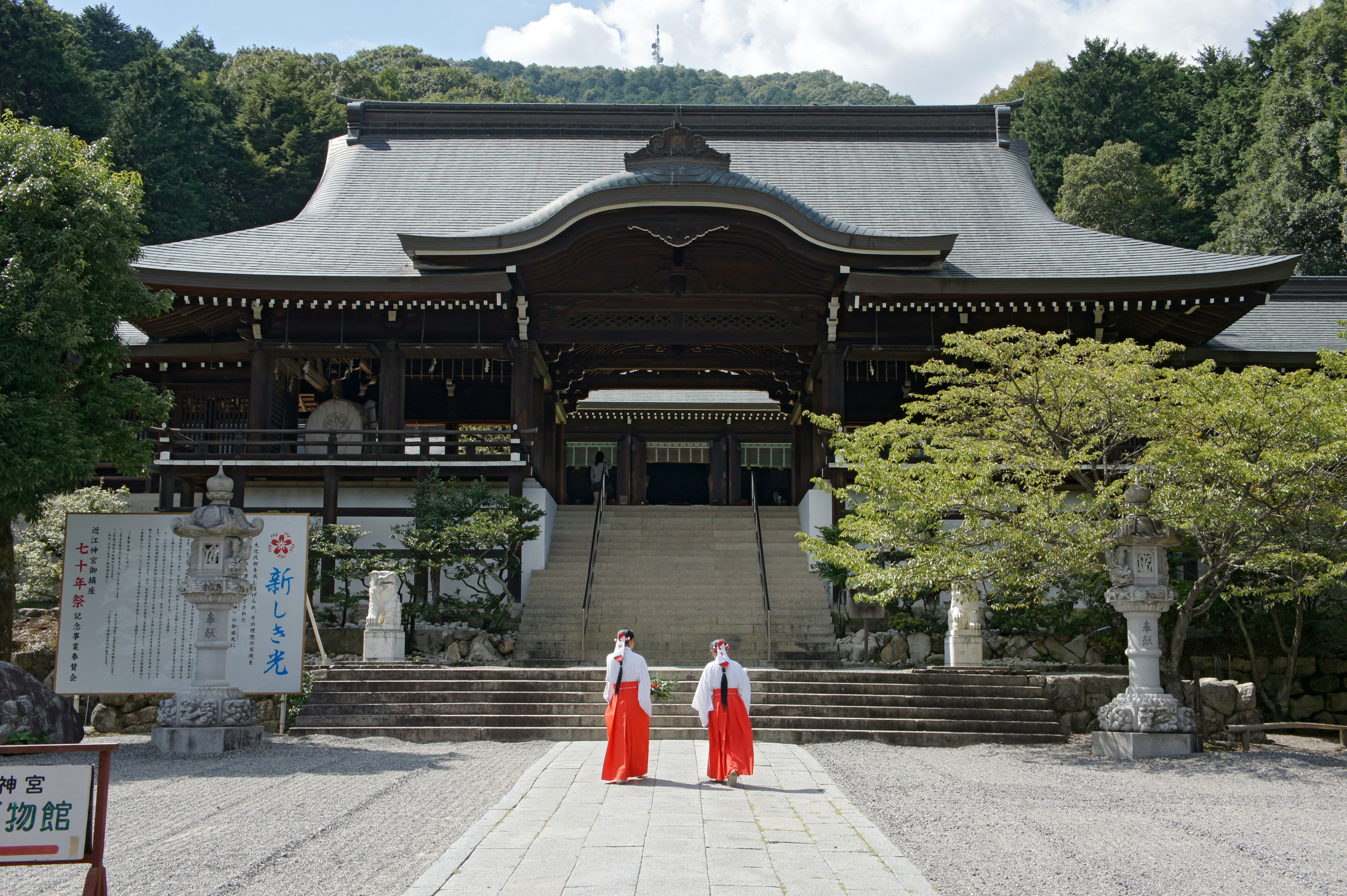
Gehaiden (外拝殿: Outer Haiden)

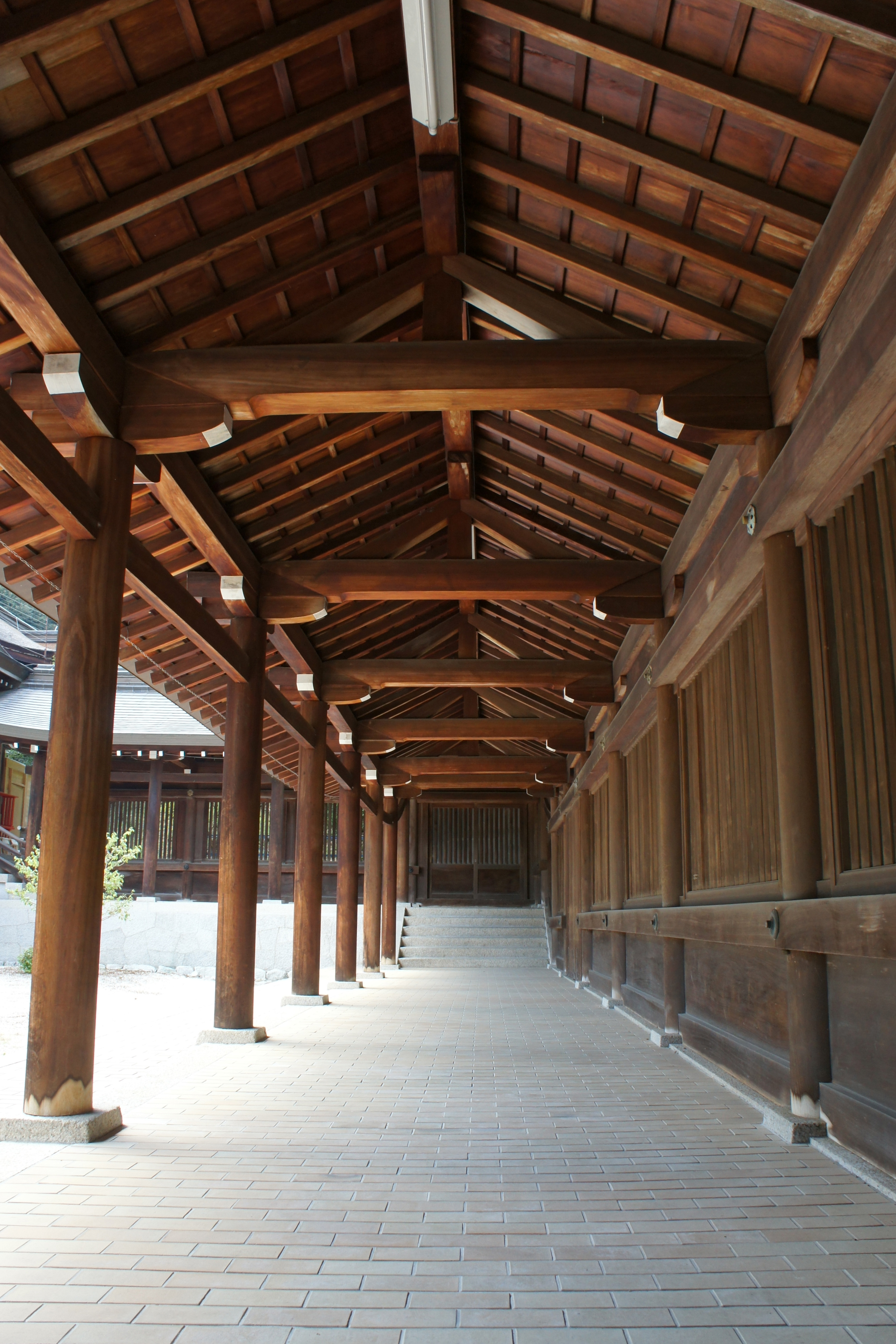
Gehaiden Naiin-Kairō (内院回廊: The corridor of the innermost shrine)

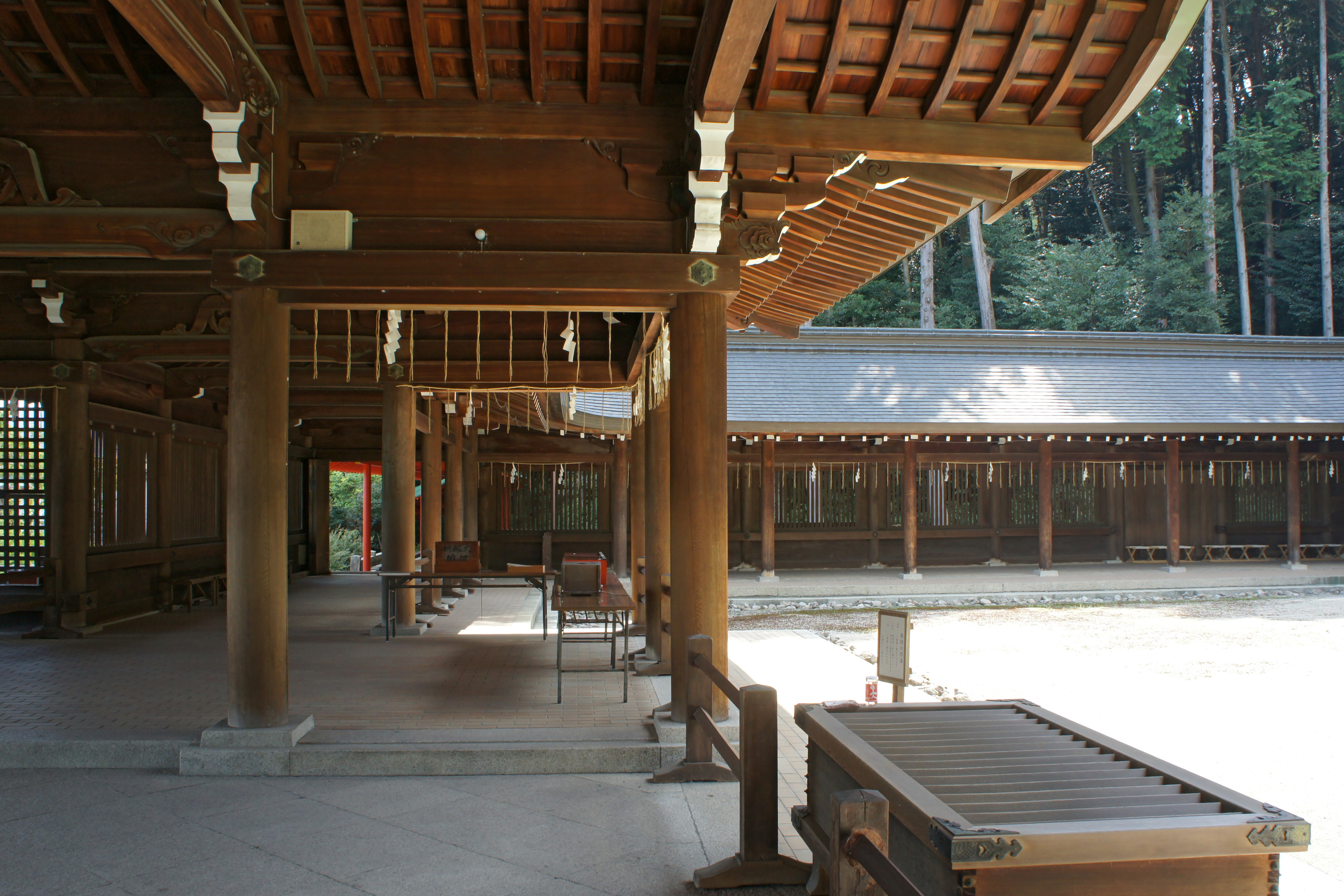
Gehaiden (外拝殿: Outer Haiden) and Naiin-Kairō (内院回廊: The corridor of the innermost shrine)

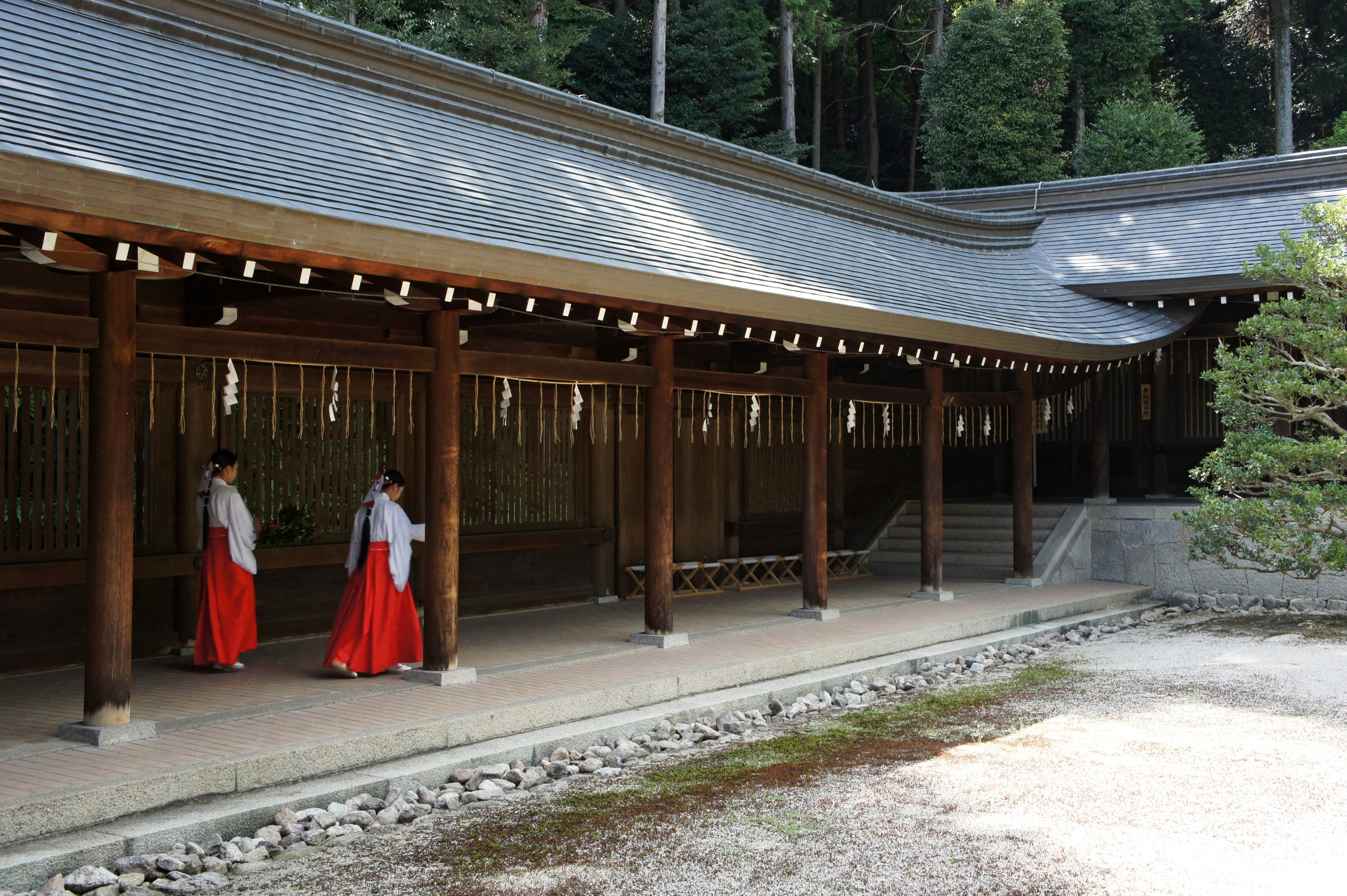
Naiin-Kairō (内院回廊)

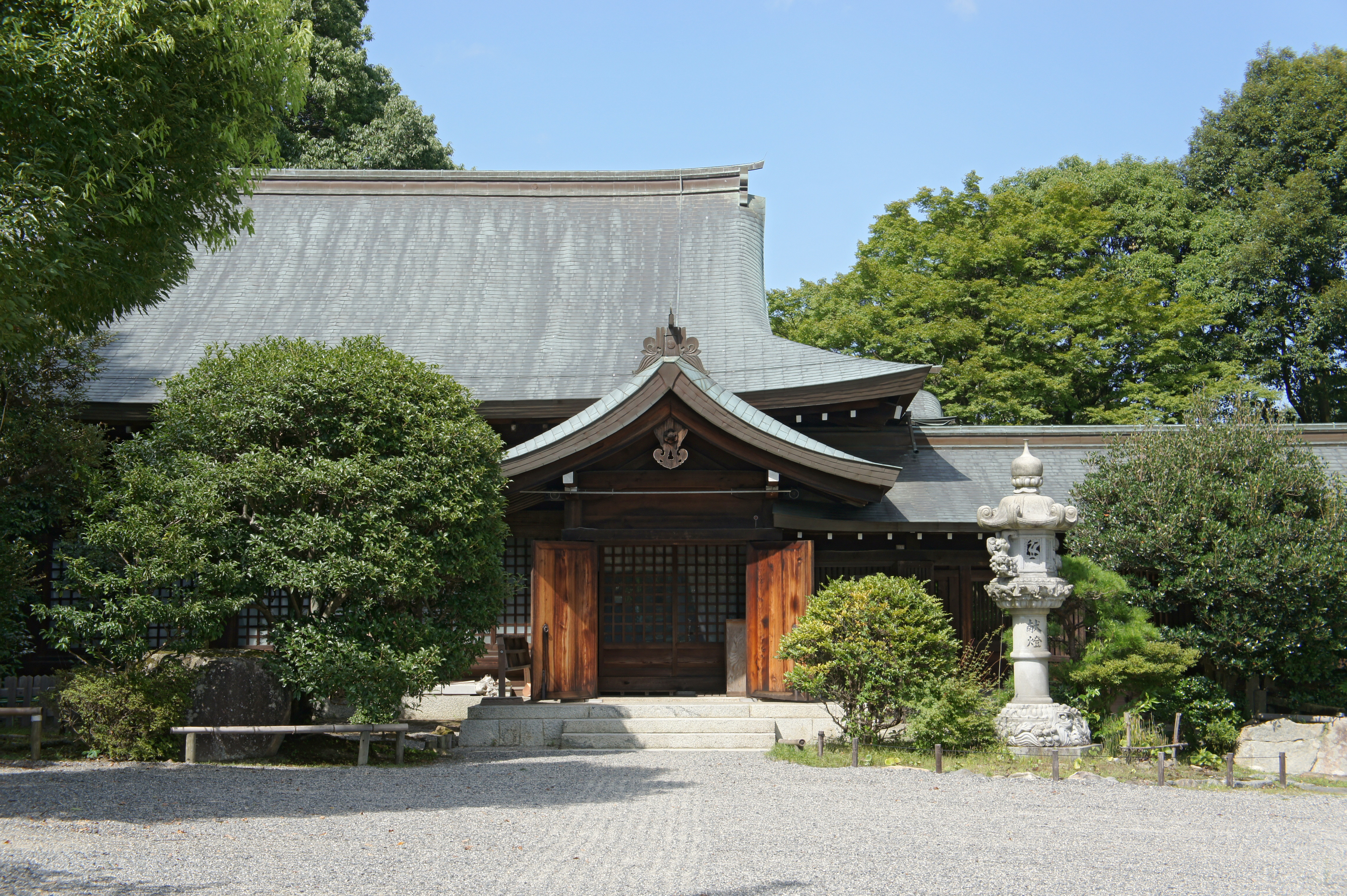
Kaguraden (神楽殿: Hall for a sacred symbol)

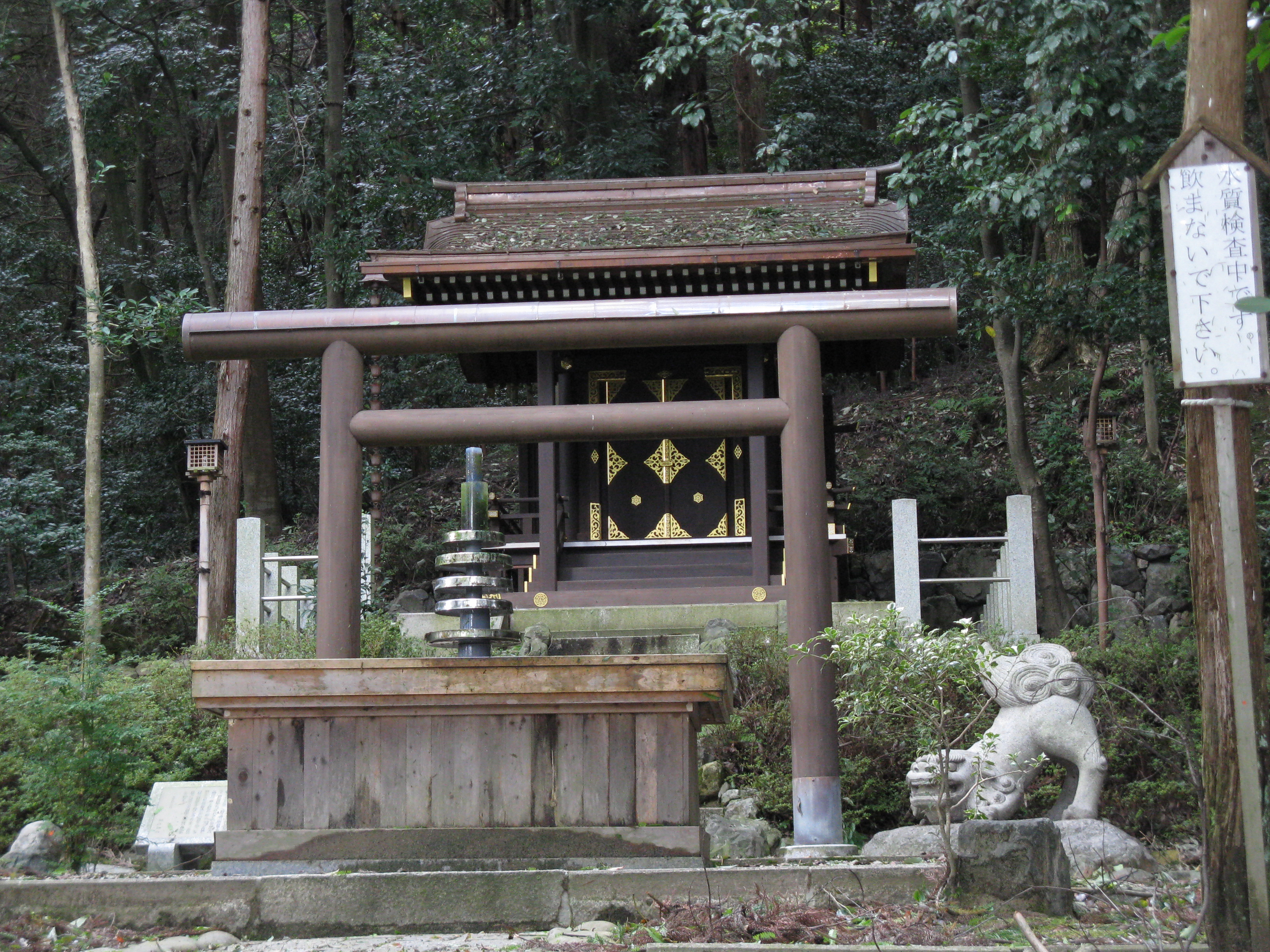
Seishō Yōhaiden (栖松遥拝殿: The hall to worship kami from afar)

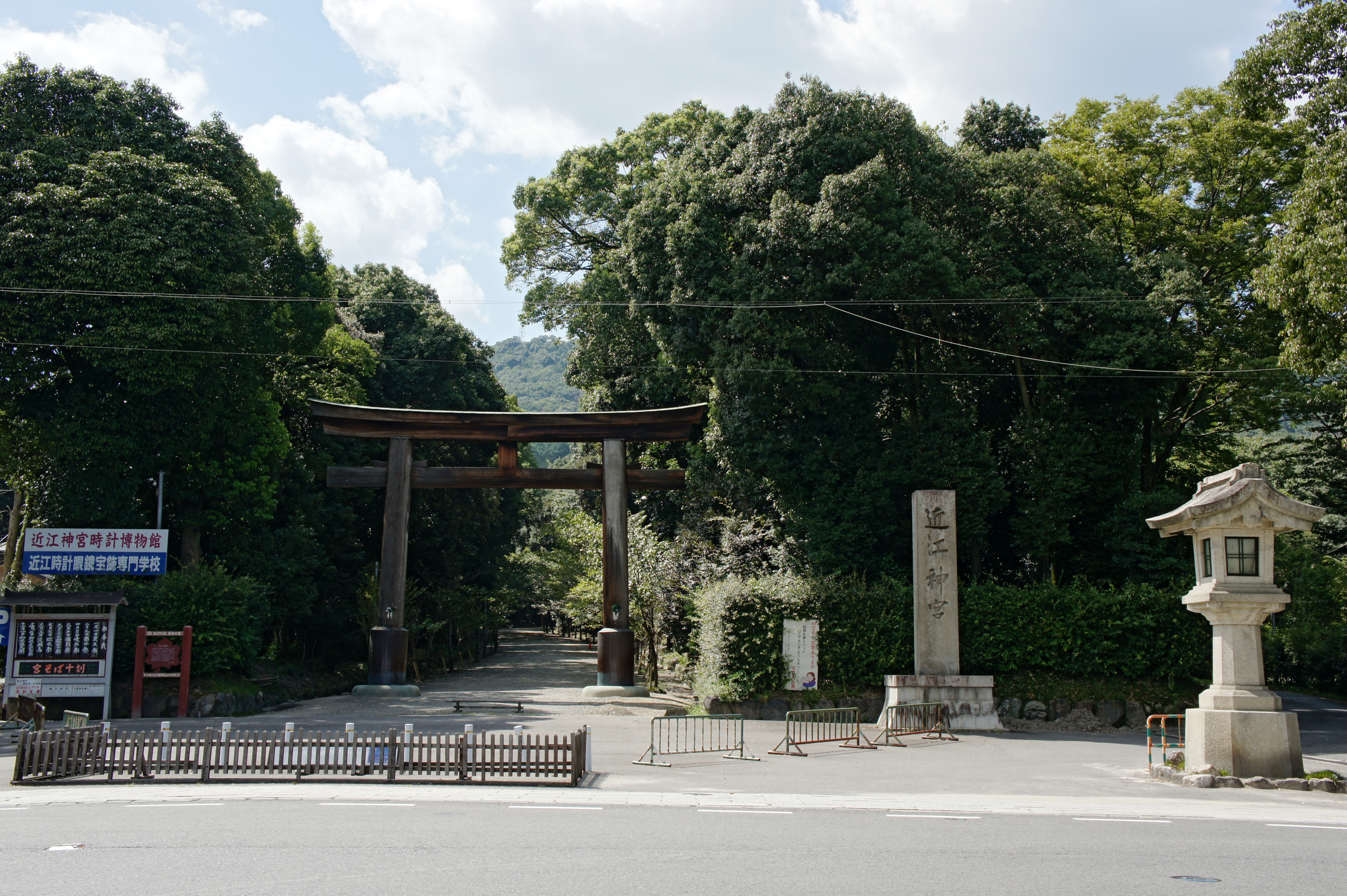
Ichi-no-Torii (一の鳥居: First gate)

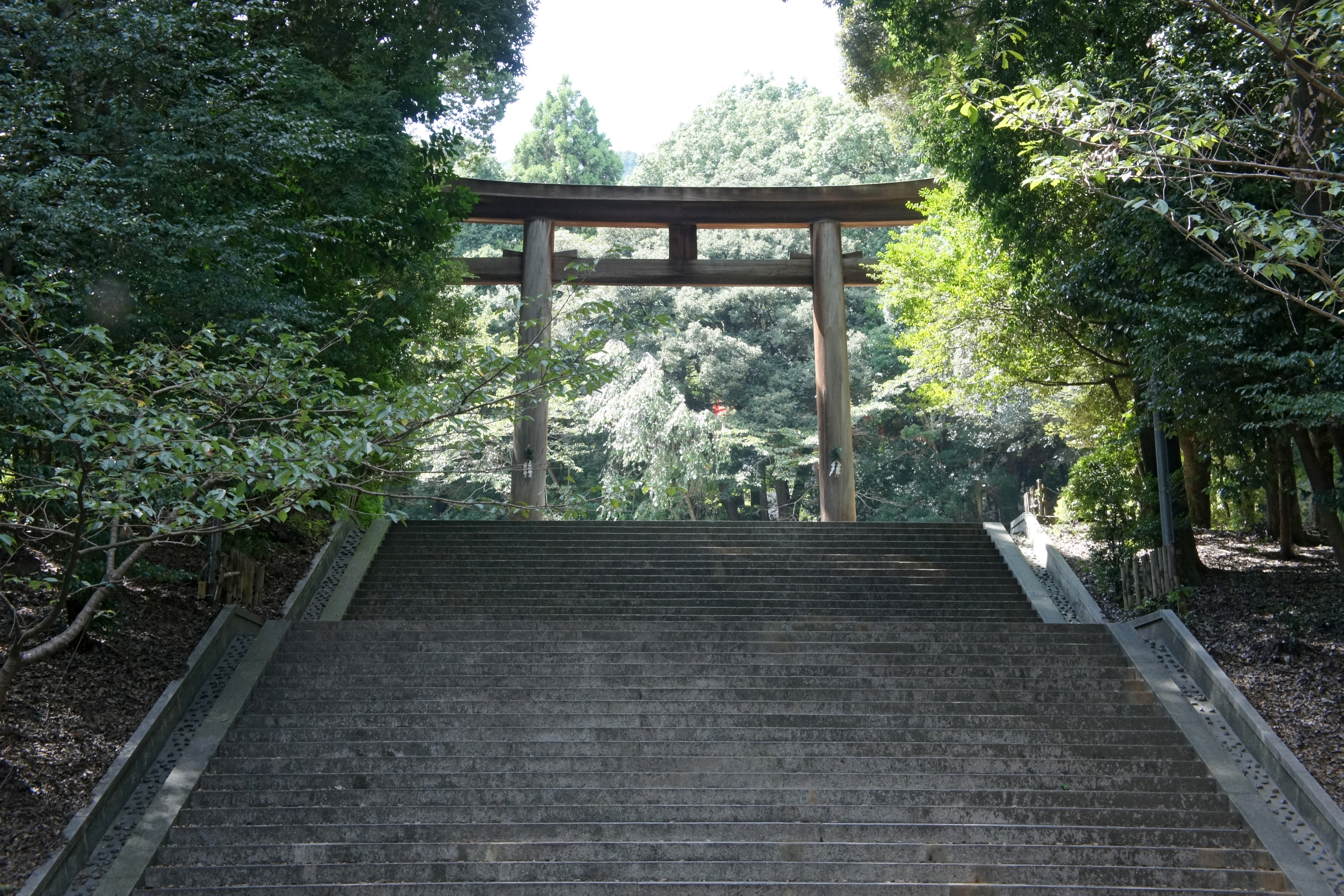
Ni-no-Torii (二の鳥居: Second gate)

== Monument status ==
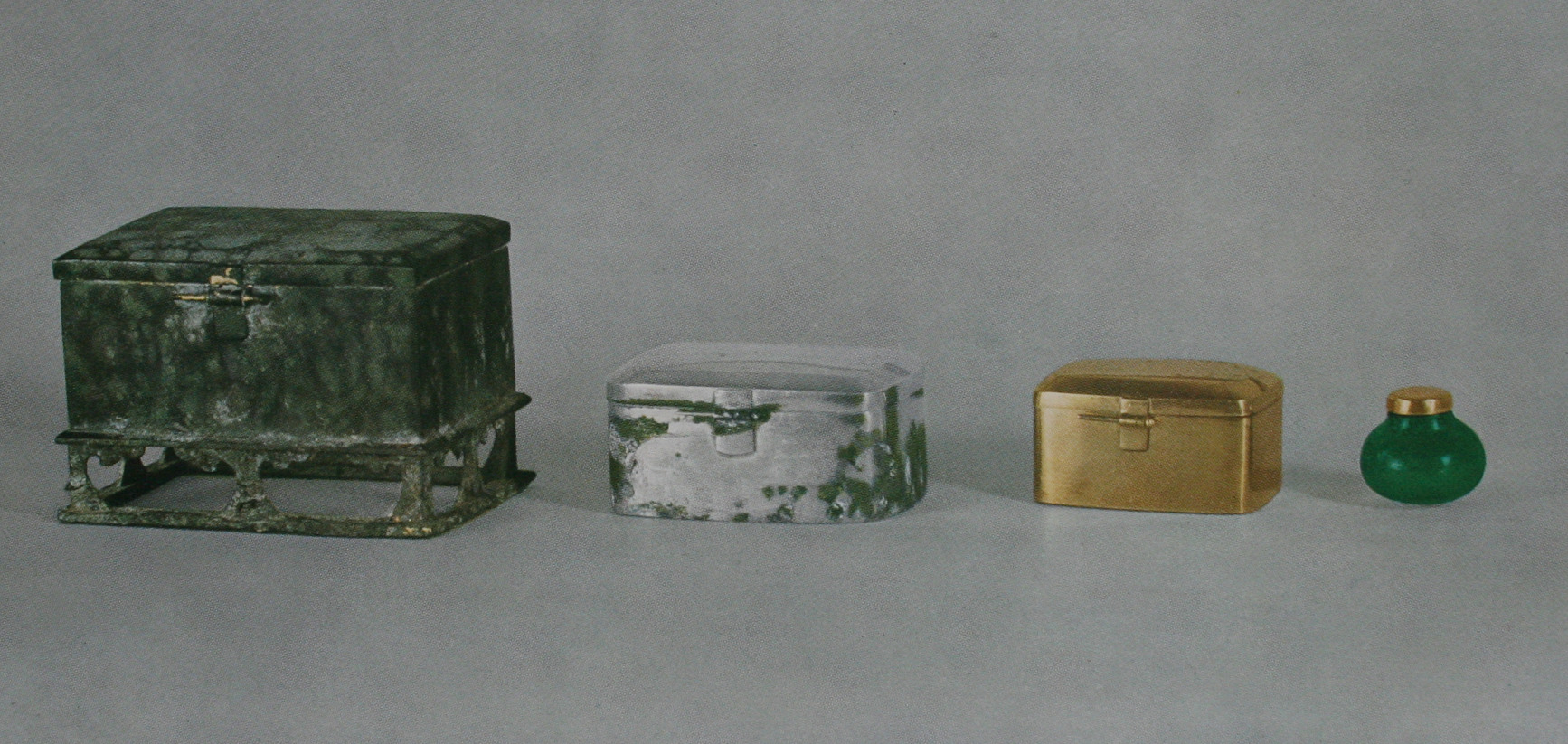
Shari container of Sufukuji-tou-shinso-nochihin: Kinsen-hekiruritubo、Kinsei-Uchibako、insei-Nakabako、Kondo-Sotobako from right

=== National treasure of Japan ===
Search in the online database of the Agency for Cultural Affairs of Japan for country's designated cultural properties

- Sufukuji-tō-shinso-nōchihin (崇福寺塔心礎納置品) x1 set - deposited to Kyoto National Museum
  - Shari (舎利) x3
  - Shari container (舎利容器) x1
    - Kinsen-hekiruritubo (金蓋碧瑠璃壺) x1
    - Kinsei-Uchibako (金製内箱) x1
    - Ginsei-Nakabako (銀製中箱) x1
    - Kondo-Sotobako (金銅外箱) x1
  - Ruri-Gyoku (瑠璃玉) x1 set
  - Kōgyoku-Marutama (硬玉丸玉) x3
  - Kondō-Haitekkyo (金銅背鉄鏡) x1
  - Mumonginsen (無文銀銭) x11
  - Suishō-ryu (水晶粒) x2
  - Dōrei (銅鈴)（残欠共） x2
  - Kinpaku-Moppen-Sonota-Hanshutsubutsu-Issai (金箔木片其他伴出物一切)

=== Important cultural properties of Japan ===
Search in the "Cultural Heritage Online" of the Agency for Cultural Affairs of Japan

- Hakuji-Suichu (白磁水注/滋賀県大津市滋賀里町字勧学堂出土) - deposited to The Museum of Shiga Prefecture, Biwako-Bunkakan
- Shihonbokuga-tansai-tokakusansuizu (紙本墨画淡彩楼閣山水図) Rokkyoku-Byōbu-Isso (六曲屏風一双) by Soga Shōhaku - deposited to The Museum of Shiga Prefecture, Biwako-Bunkakan

=== Registered tangible cultural property of Japan ===
Search in the "Cultural Heritage Online" of the Agency for Cultural Affairs of Japan

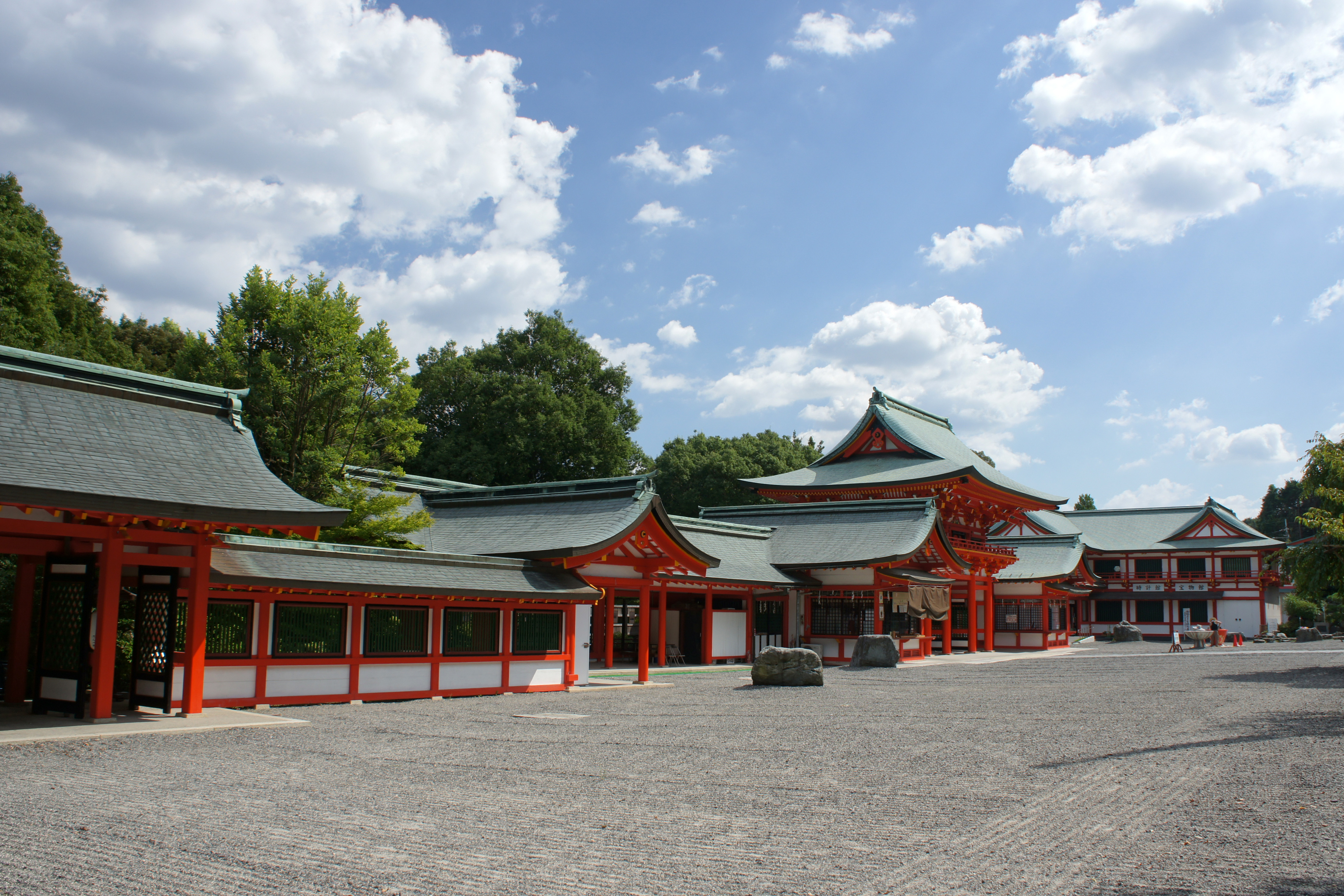
From front, Kitashin-mon (北神門)、Sotosukibei (外透塀)、Sotokairo (外廻廊)、Jinpu-Juyosho (神符授与所)、Rōmon (楼門)

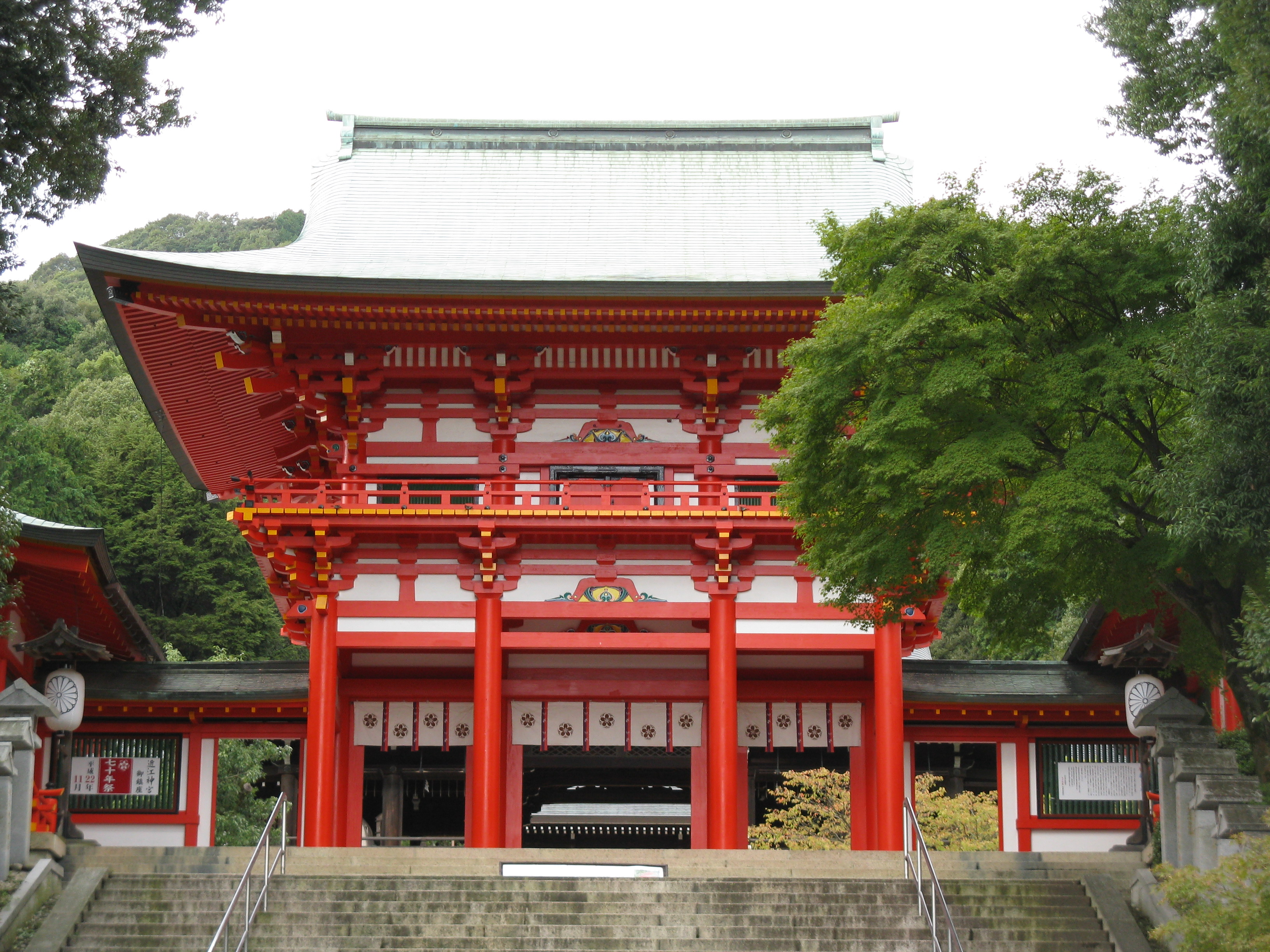
Rōmon (楼門)

- First Torii (第一鳥居: 1st gate)
- Second Torii (第二鳥居: 2nd gate)
- Rest house for worshippers (参拝者休憩所: soba restaurant; Zen-an (善庵))
- Chōzuya/Temizuya (手水舎: Purification font)
- Jidōsya (car)-kiyoharaesho (自動車清祓所（旧大津裁判所本館車寄）)
- Jinpu-Juyosho (神符授与所: The place to provide amulets)
- Shukuei-sha (宿衛舎: The lodging house of a night guard)
- Nanbu sotokairō (外廻廊 (南部): Outer south corridor)
- Hokubu sotokairō (外廻廊 (北部): Outer north corridor)
- Gehaiden (外拝殿: Outer Haiden)
- Naihaiden (内拝殿: Inner Haiden)
- Nanbu naiinkairō (内院廻廊（南部）The south corridor of the innermost shrine)
- Hokubu naiinkairō (内院廻廊（北部）The north corridor of the innermost shrine)
- Noboriro (登廊: Stairway)
- Tyumon (中門: The middle gate)
- Nanbu yokurō (翼廊 (南部): South transept)
- Hokubu yokurō (翼廊 (北部): North transept)
- South sukibei (透塀 (南部): South see-through fence)
- North sukibei (透塀 (北部): North see-through fence)
- Watariro (渡廊: Connecting corridor)
- Noritosya (祝詞舎: Prayer hall)
- Honden (本殿: Main hall)
- Hokura (神庫: small shrine)
- Komon (後門: Back gate)
- Kitashinmon (北神門: North kami's gate)
- Nanbu sotosukibei (外透塀（南部）South outer see-through fence)
- Hokubu sotosukibei (外透塀（北部）North outer see-through fence)
- Kaguraden (神楽殿: Hall for a sacred symbol)
- Kaguraden-kairō (神楽殿廻廊: The corridor of "Kaguraden")
- Shinsensho (神饌所: Building for the preparation of food for the gods)
- Shinsensho-noborirō (神饌所登廊: The corridor of "Shinsensho")
- Sanshusho (参集所: Building for the meeting)
- Sanshusho-genkan (参集所玄関: The front door of "Sanshusho")
- Sanshusho-noborirō (参集所登楼: The stairway of "Sanshusho")
- Waki-torii (脇鳥居: smaller gate)
- Saikan (斎館: a building where a Shinto-Buddhist priest is confined)
- Saikan-genkan (斎館玄関: The front door of "Saikan")
- Chokushi-genkan (勅使玄関: The front door for "Chokushi")
- Shamusho 1 (社務所1: Shrine office I)
- Syamusho 2 (社務所2: Shrine office II)
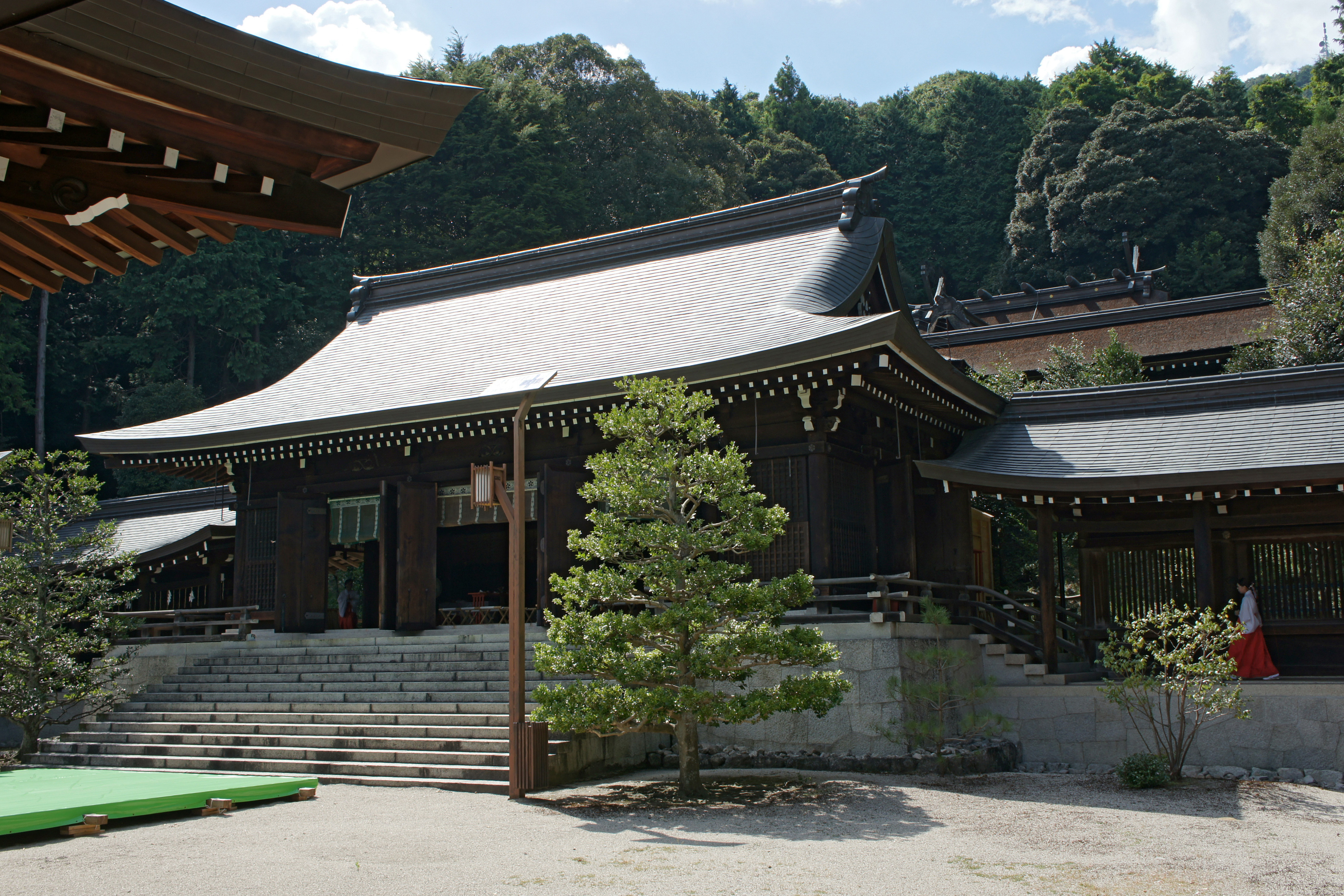
Naihaiden and the back of Honden

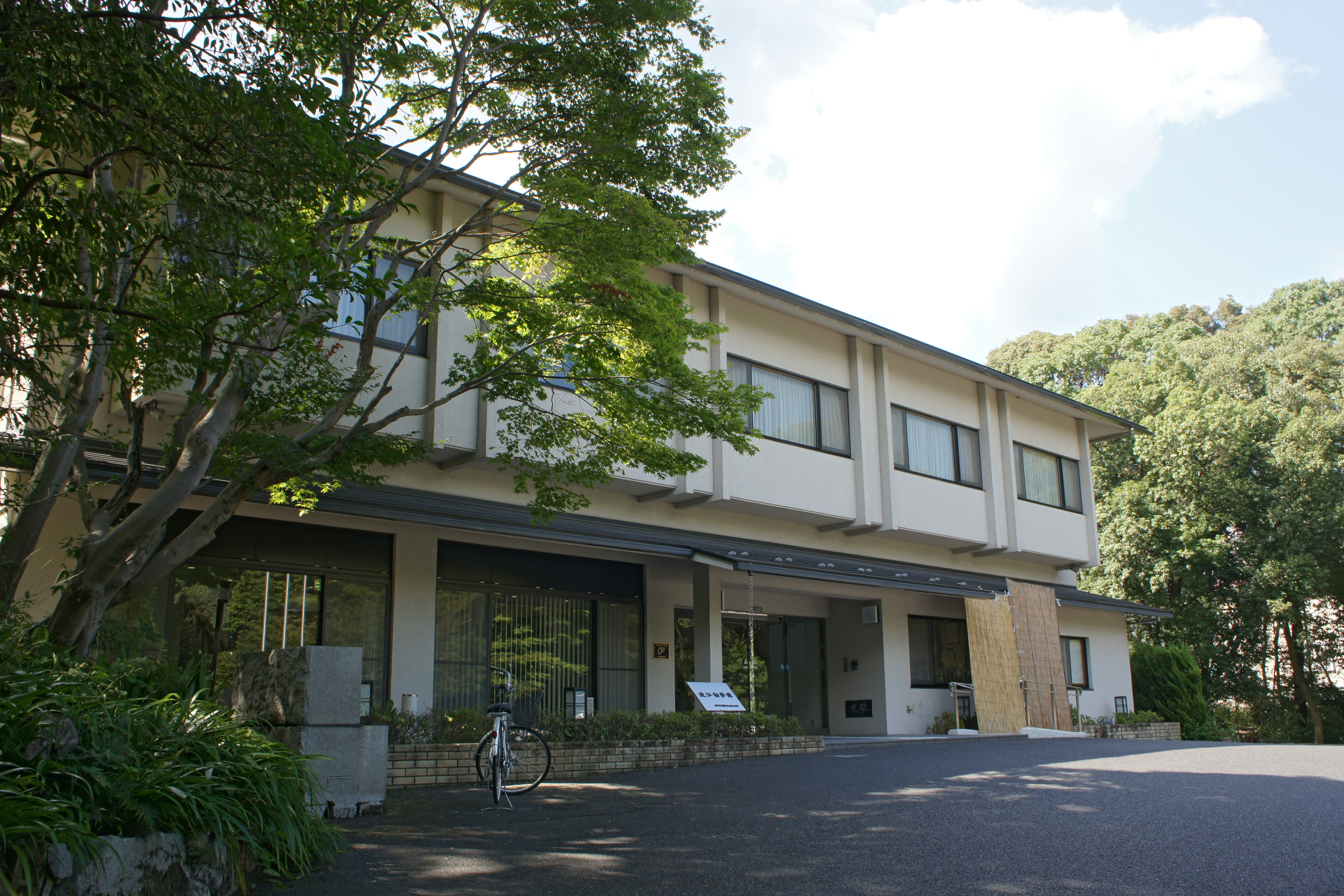
Omi Kangakukan (近江勧学館: Omi school)

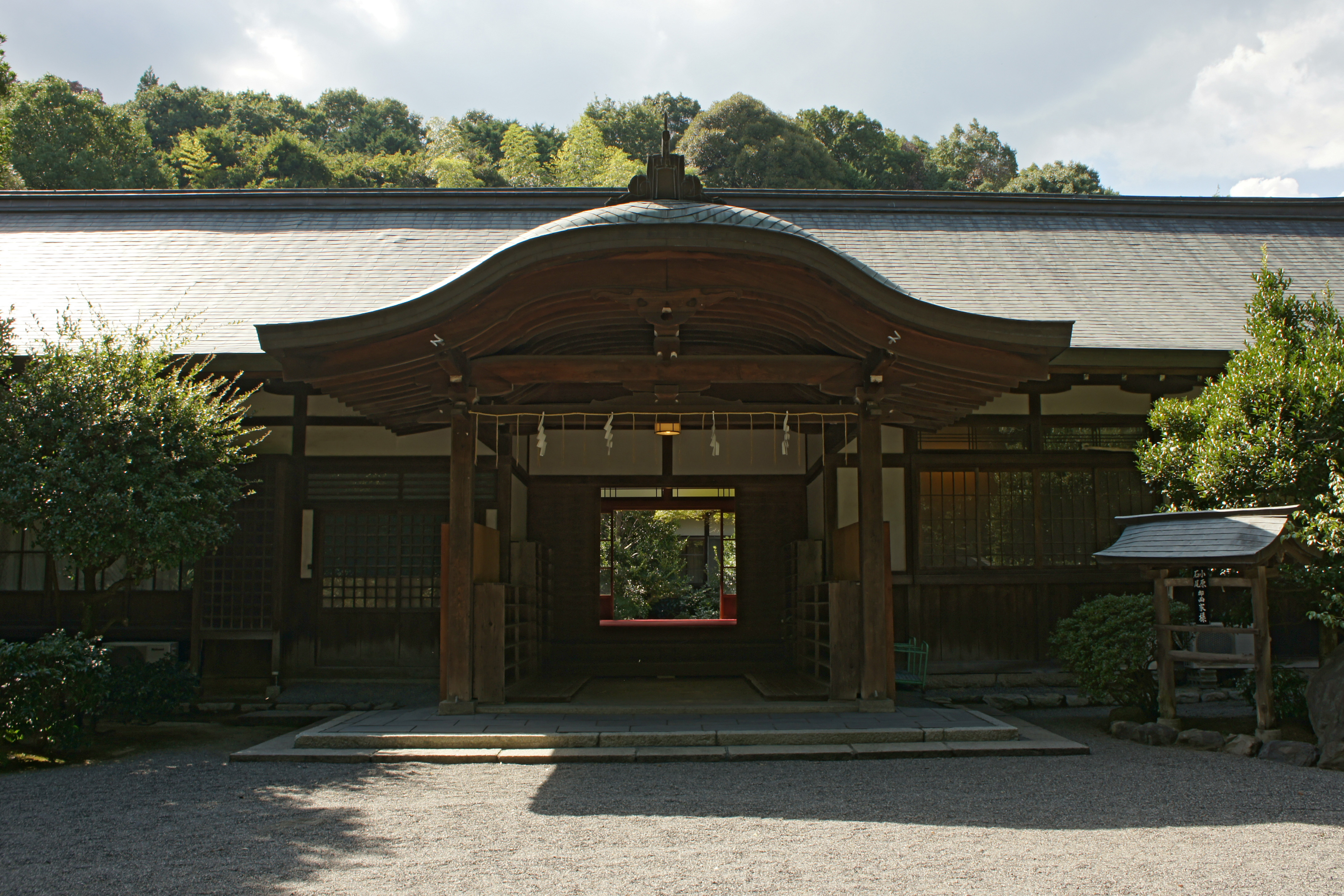
ShamushoI (社務所I: Shrine office I)

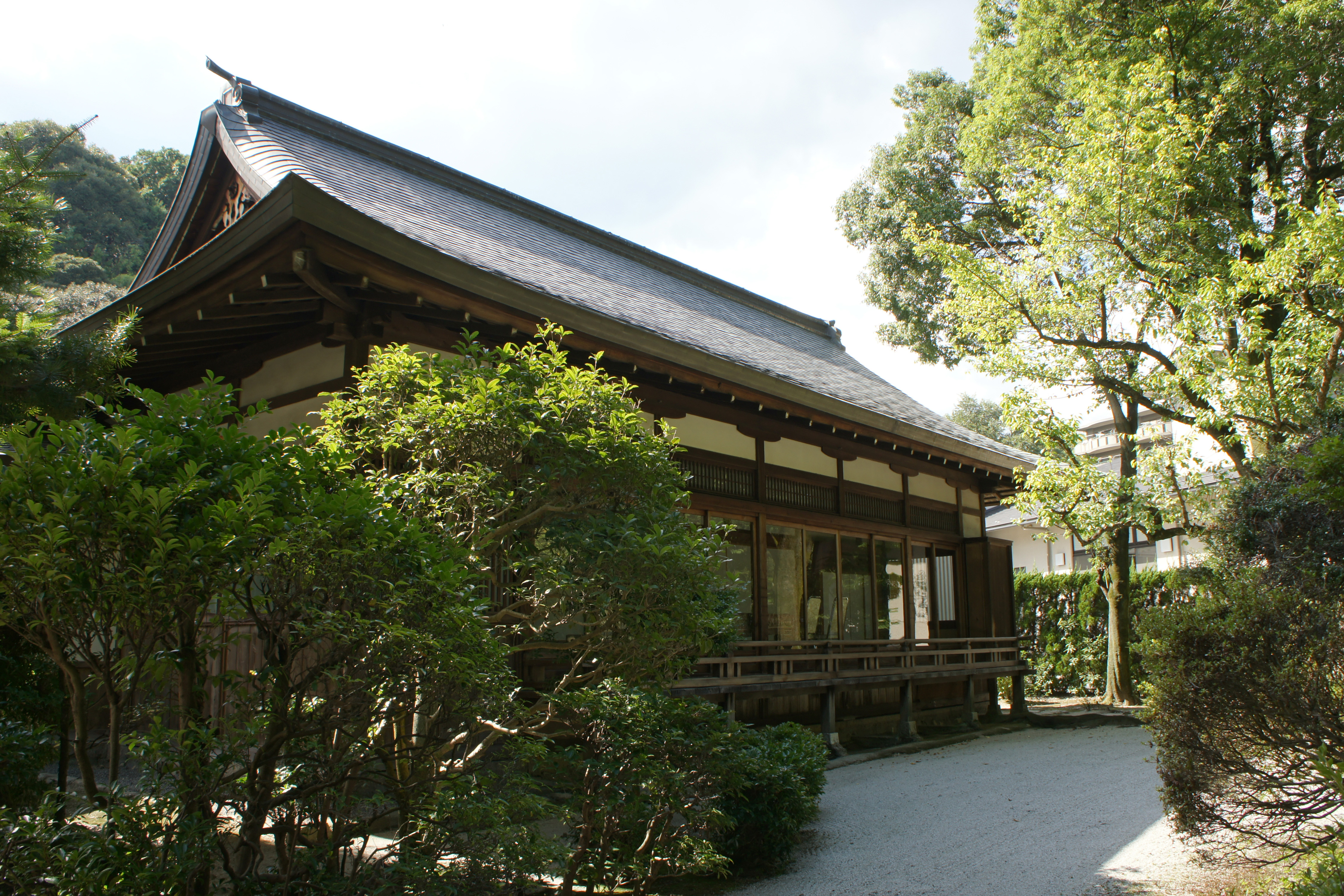
ShamushoI (社務所I: Shrine office I)

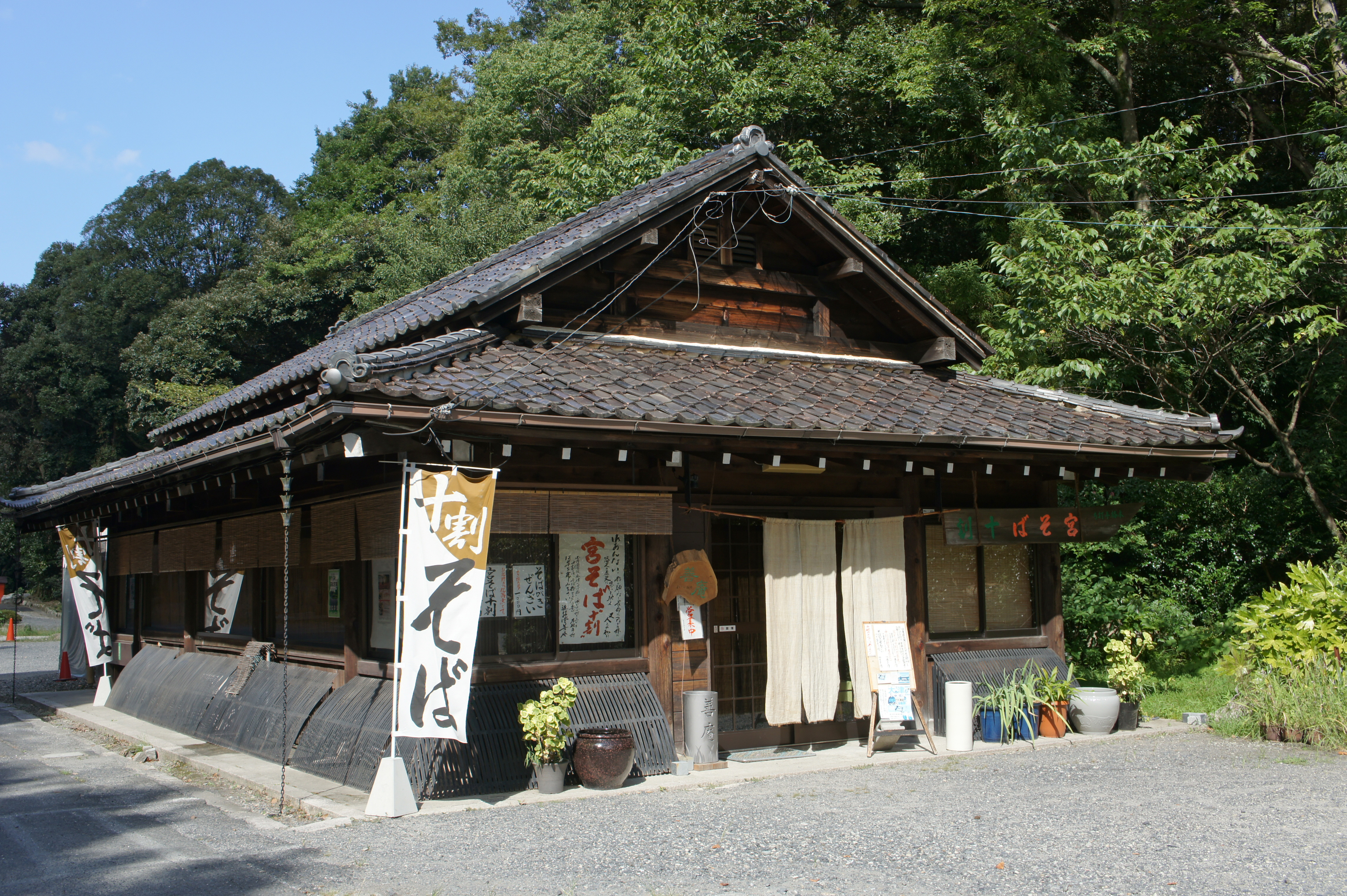
Rest house for worshippers (soba restaurant)

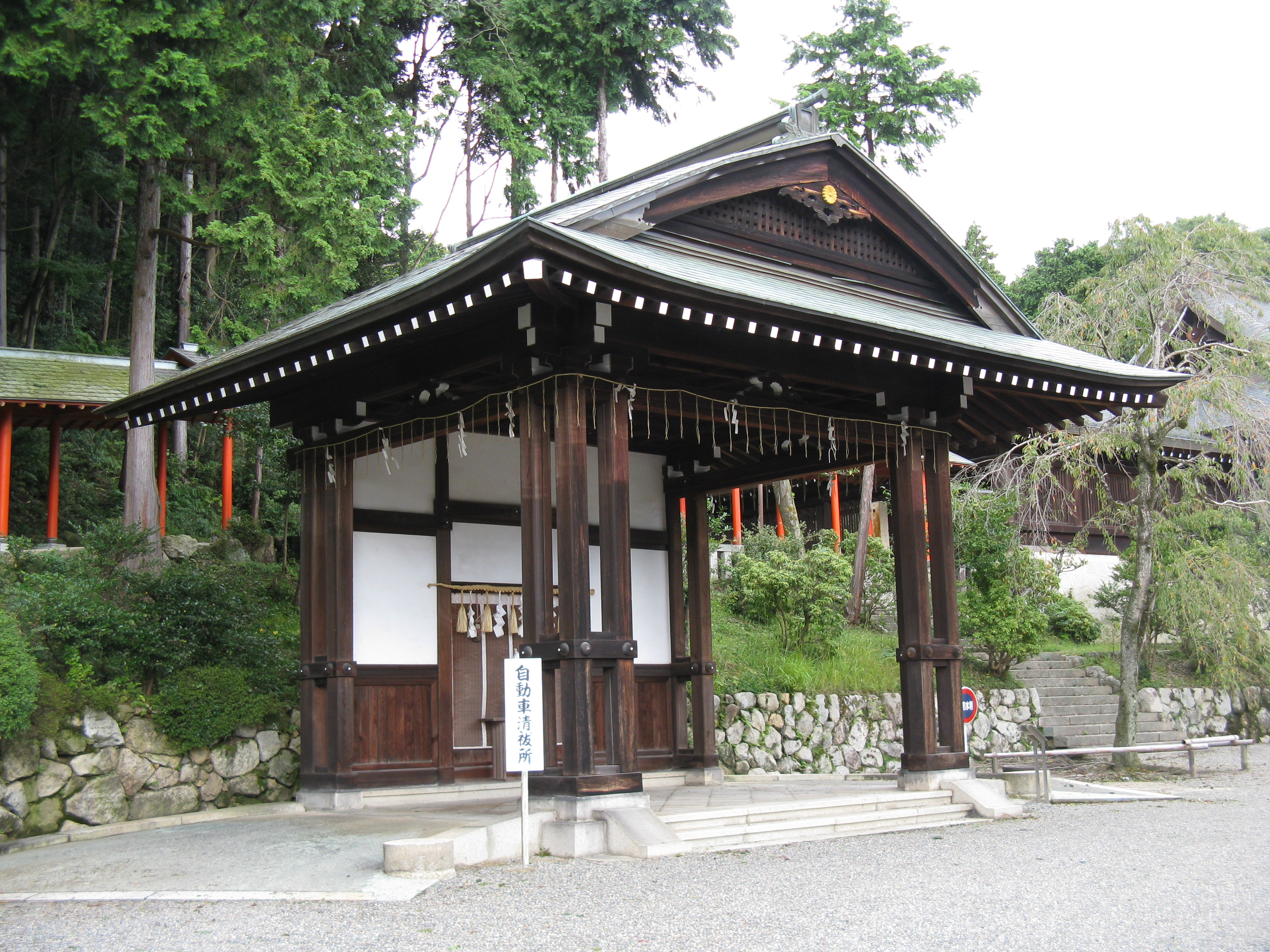
Jidōsya (car)-kiyoharaesho (自動車清祓所: Purification place for cars)

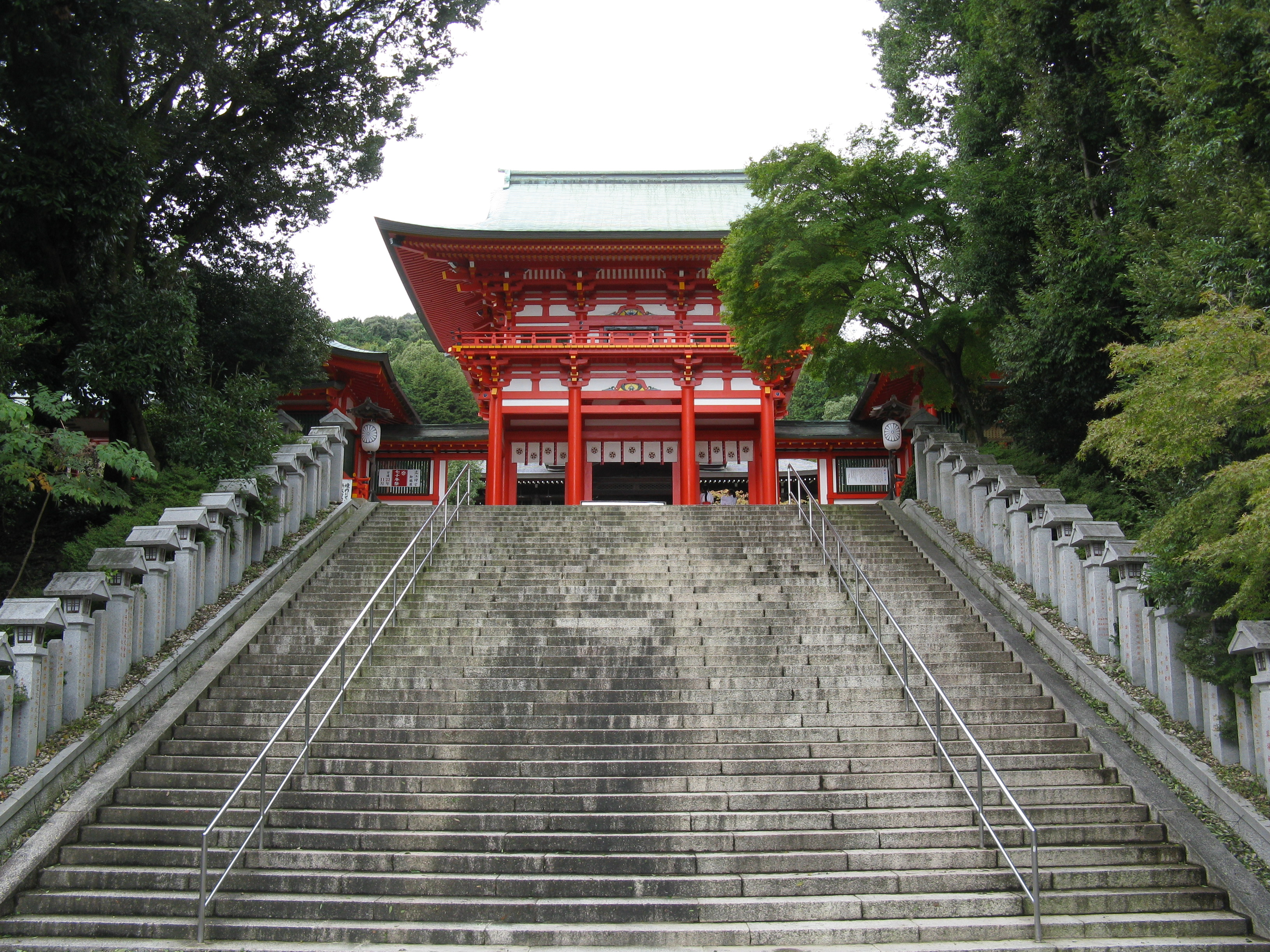
Rōmon (楼門)

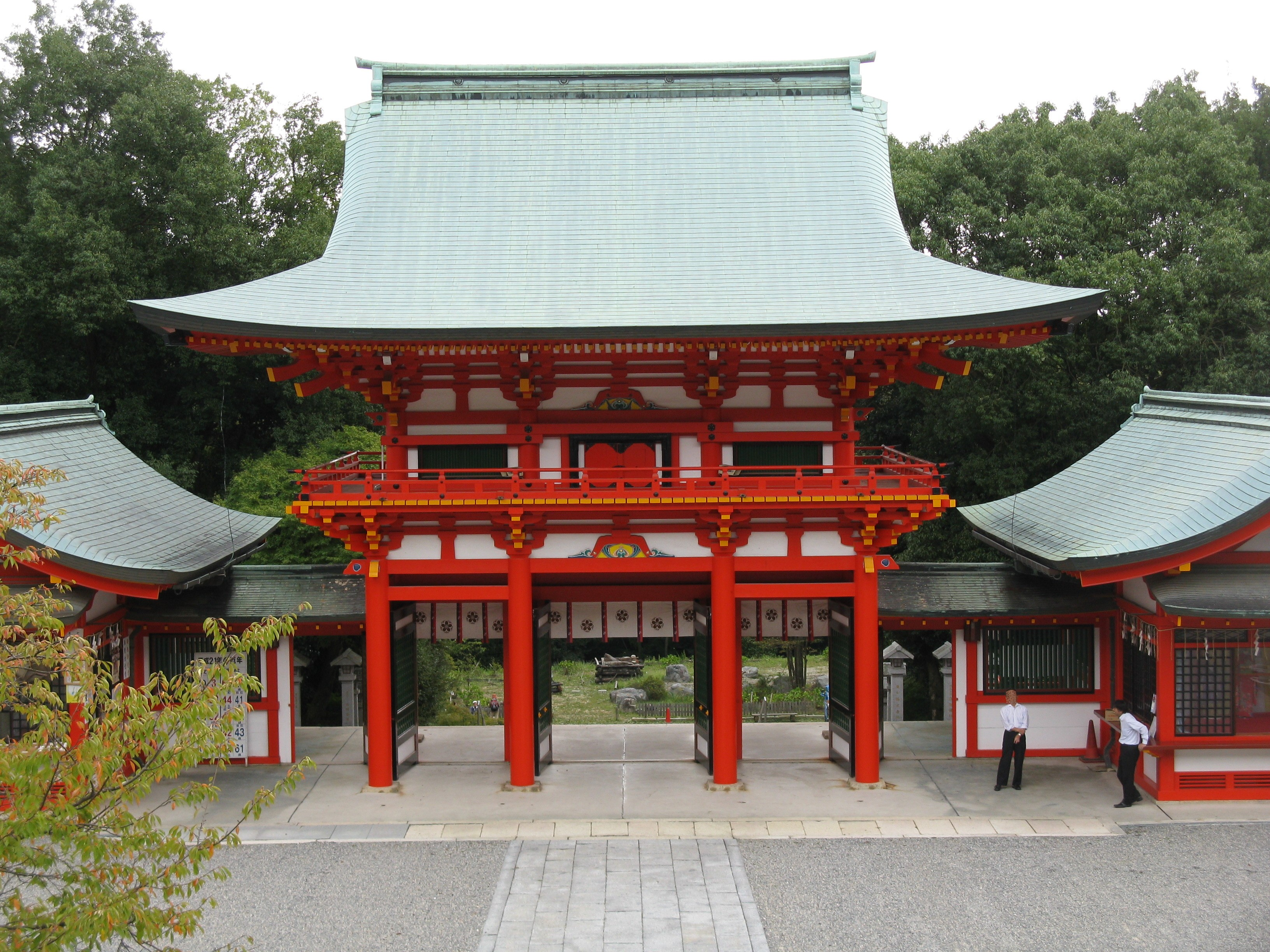
Rōmon (楼門)

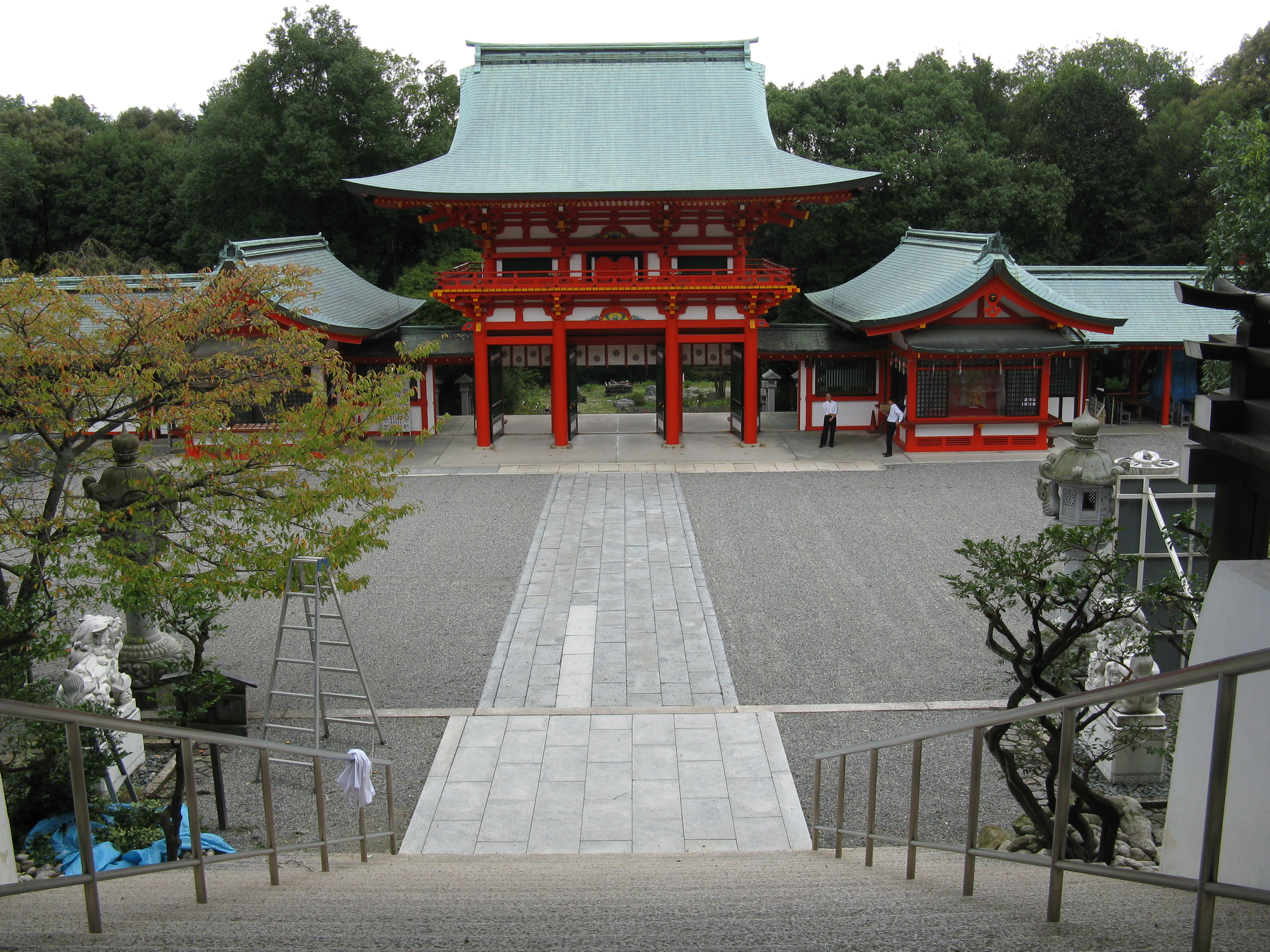
Rōmon (楼門)

=== Monuments inscribed with poems (tanka and haiku) ===
Poem monuments made by the carving of famous tanka and haiku on natural stone is known as kuhi (句碑) and kahi (歌碑), respectively. The Omi shrine has 13 poem monuments.

- (芭蕉 句碑) Kuhi inscribed with a Matsuo Bashō's haiku, "から崎の松は花より朧にて".
- (天智天皇 御製) Kahi inscribed with an Emperor Tenji's tanka, "秋の田の刈穂の庵の苫をあらみわが衣手は露にぬれつゝ".
- (横井時常（第2代宮司）歌碑: ) Kahi inscribed with a Tokitsune Yokoi (1st Guji)'s tanka, "歳神は今帰らすか左義長の青竹はぜて高く燃え立つ".
- (平田貫一（初代宮司）歌碑: ) Kahi inscribed with a Kanichi Hirata (2nd Guji)'s tanka, "比叡ヶ嶺に近く琵琶湖を目下に大神の辺に永世住まなむ".
- (香川進 歌碑) "Susumu Kagawaa: 湖ほとに息づき比そめと波はいひは留けく可奈志と波はまたいふ".
- (山村金三郎 歌碑) Kahi inscribed with a Kanesaburō Yamamura's tanka, "湖に音なき音を韻かせて比良ゆ流るる夕茜雲".
- (保田與重郎 歌碑) Kahi inscribed with a Yojurō Yasuda's tanka, "さざなみのしがの山路の春にまよひひとり眺めし花盛りかな".
- (春日真木子 歌碑) Kahi inscribed with a Makiko Kasuga's tanka, "人間の智恵のはじめよひそひそと秘色の水に刻まあたらし".
- (伊藤香舟女 句碑) Kuhi inscribed with Kashujo Itō's haiku, "楼門に湖脈打てる望の月".
- (桂樟蹊子 句碑) Kuhi inscribed with Shōkeishi Katsura's haiku, "漏刻の音とこしへに初日影".
- (高市黒人 歌碑) Kahi inscribed with a Takechi no Kurohito's tanka, "楽浪乃国都美神乃浦佐備而荒有京見者悲毛".
- (柿本人麻呂 歌碑) Kahi inscribed with a Kakinomoto no Hitomaro's tanka, "淡海乃海夕浪千鳥汝鳴者情毛思努爾古所念".
- (大友皇子御製 漢詩) Kahi inscribed with an Emperor Kōbun (Ootomo no Miko)'s Chinese poetry, "皇皇明日月と光り 帝徳天地に載す 三才並に泰昌 万国臣義を表す".

=== Omi Jingu Tokei Museum (Clock Museum) ===
In the precincts of this shrine, the Omi Jingu Clock Museum displays various clocks centering on roukoku and Japanese clocks.

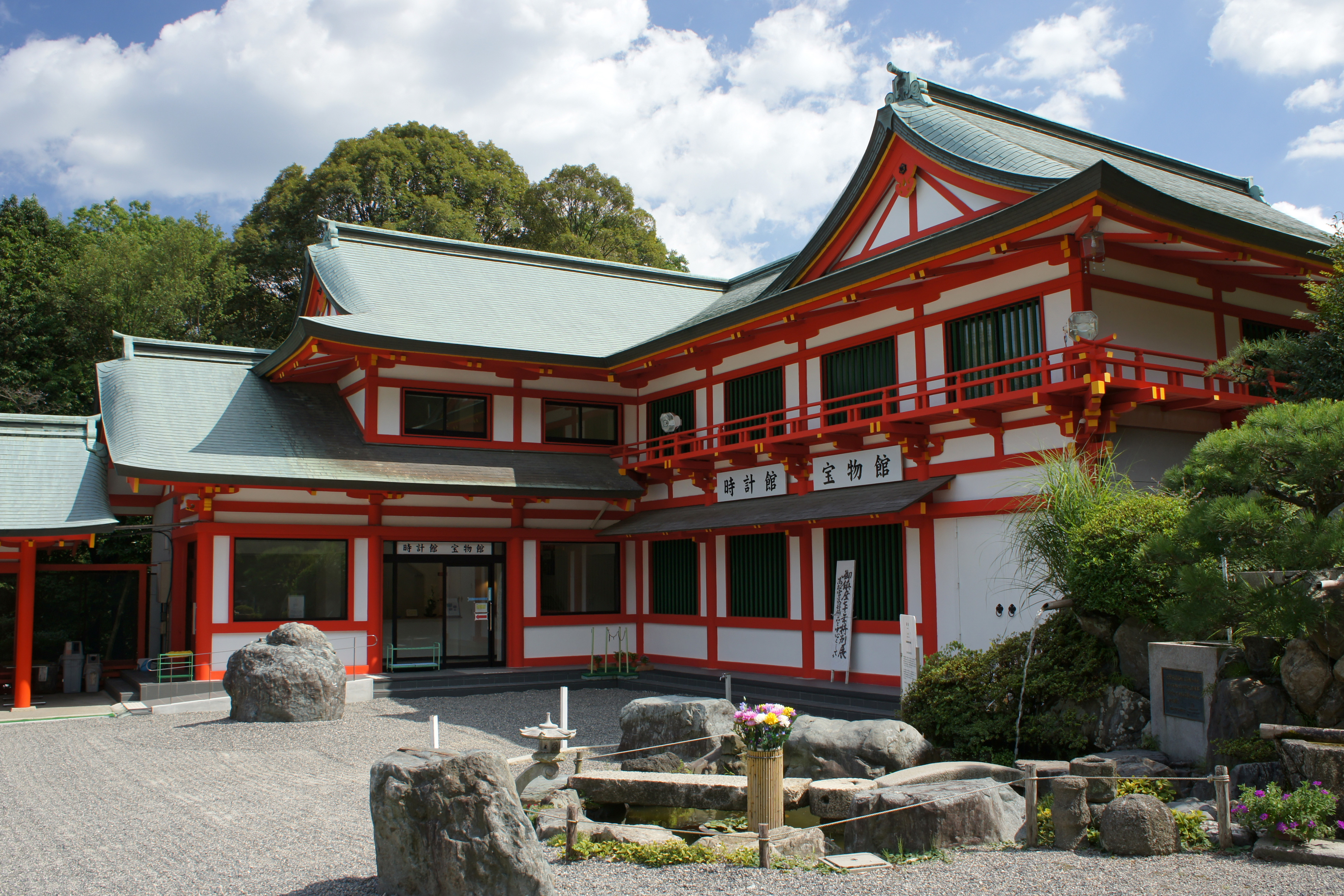
Tokei Museum (Clock Museum) (時計館宝物館)

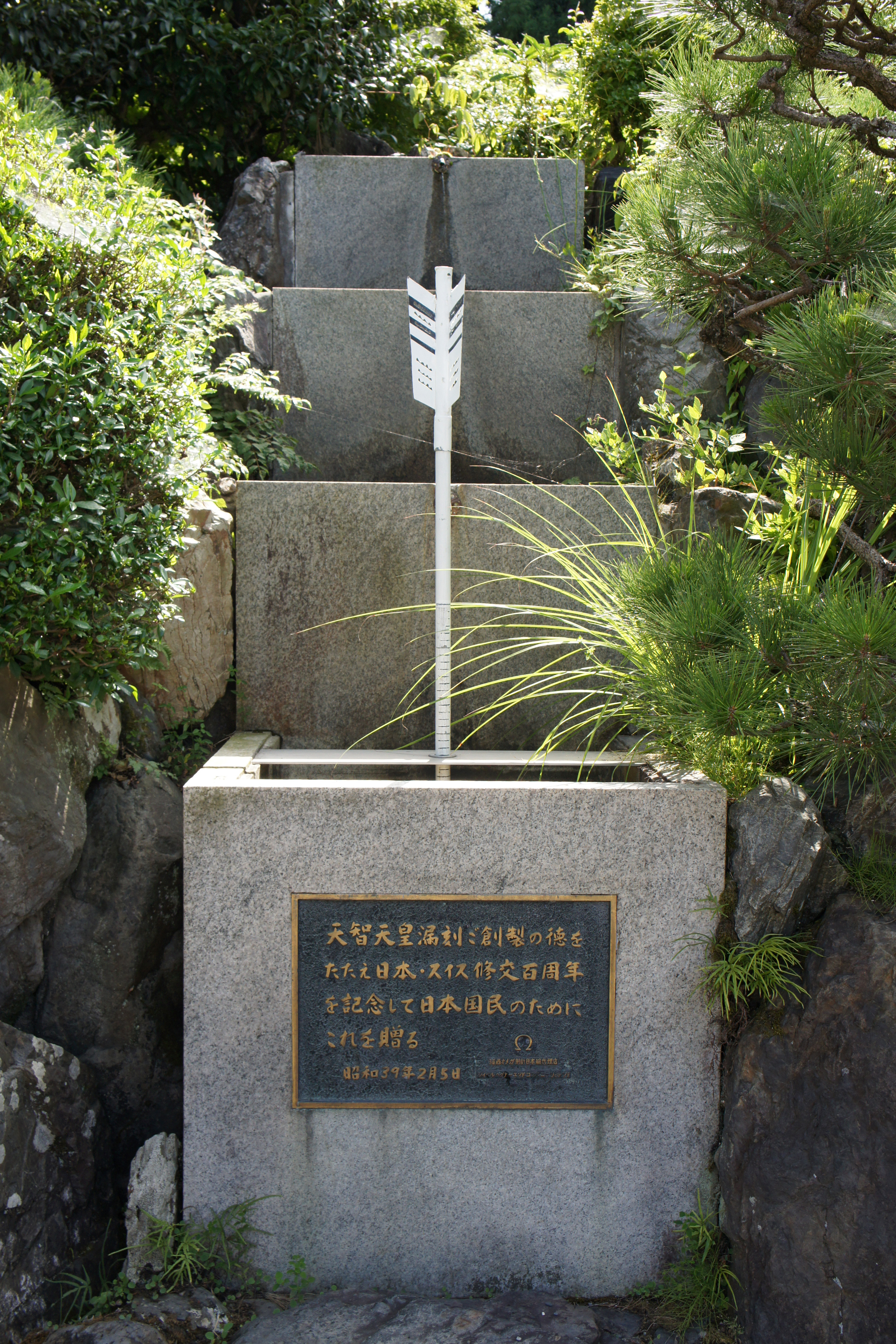
Rōkoku (漏刻)

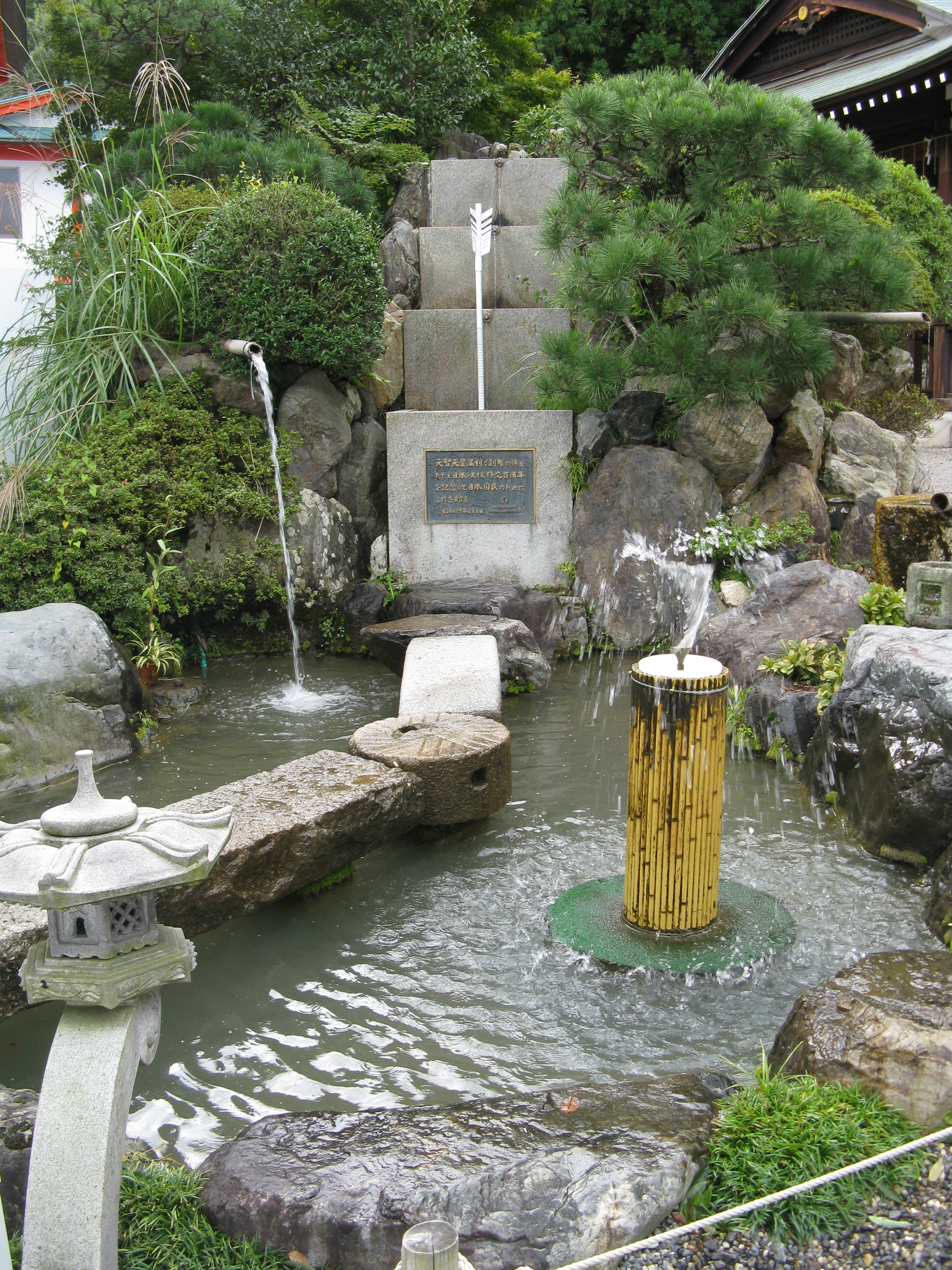
Rōkoku (漏刻)

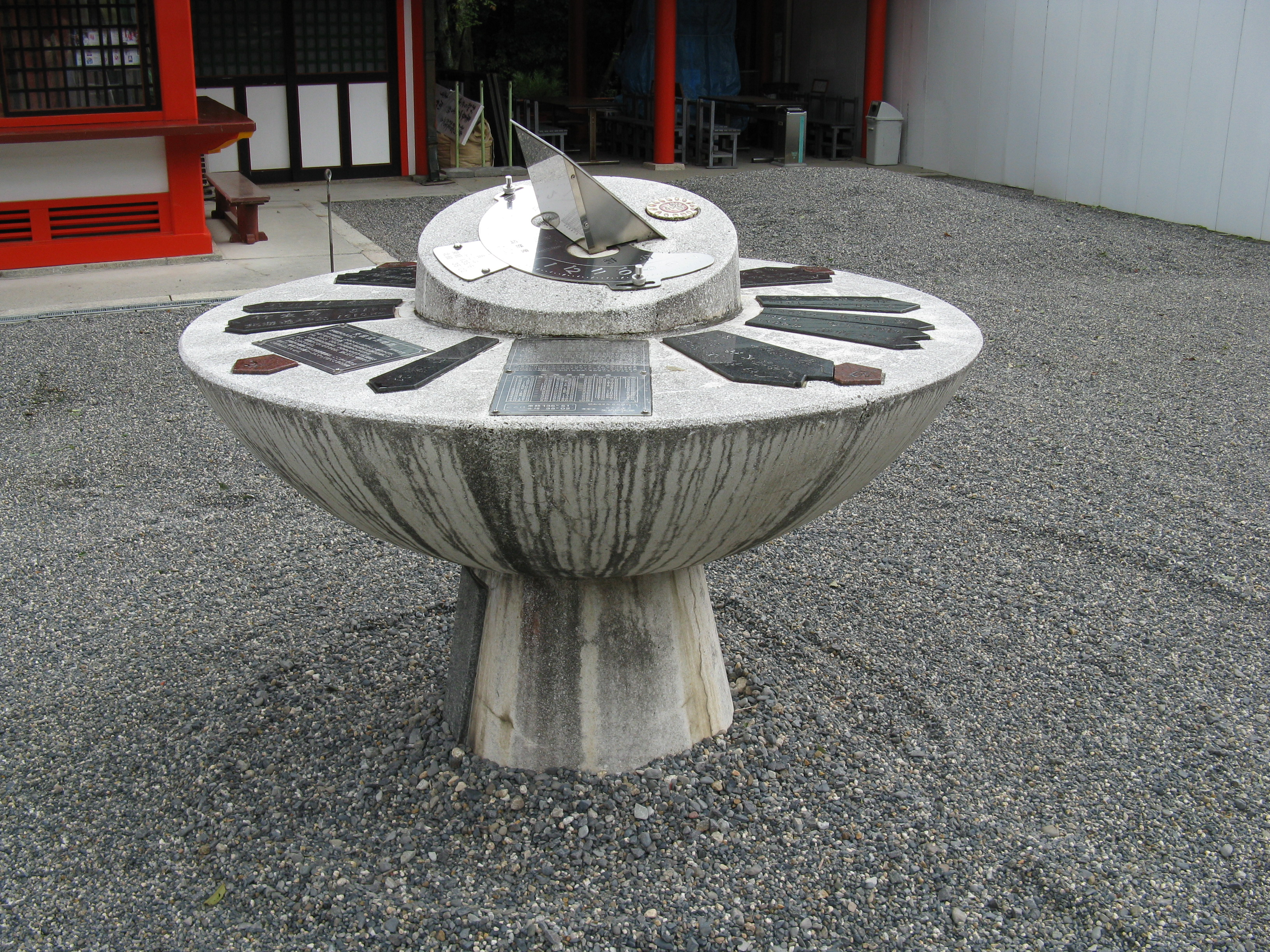
Hidokei I (日時計1: Sundial I)

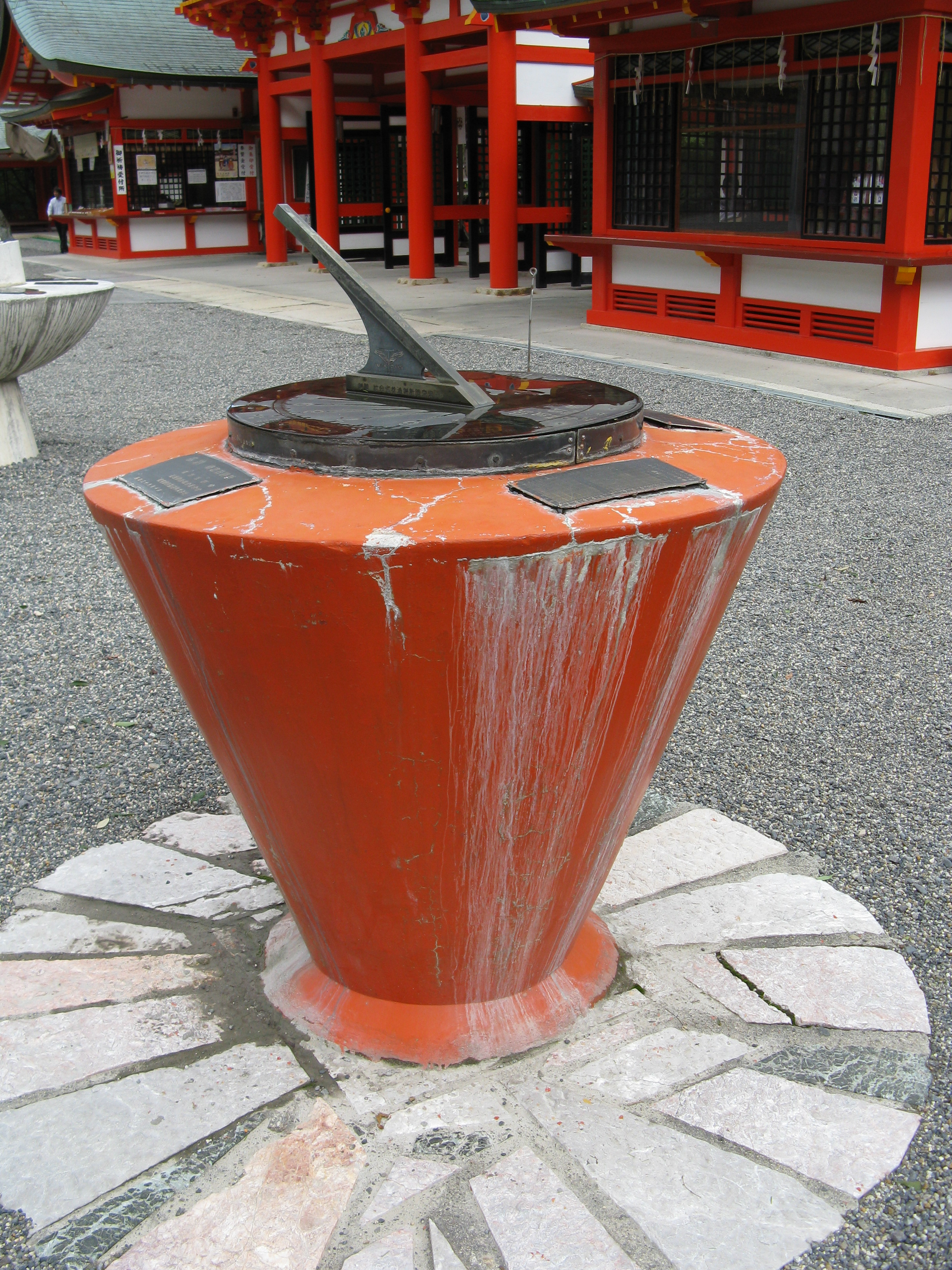
Hidokei II (日時計2: Sundial II)

== Festivals and annual events ==
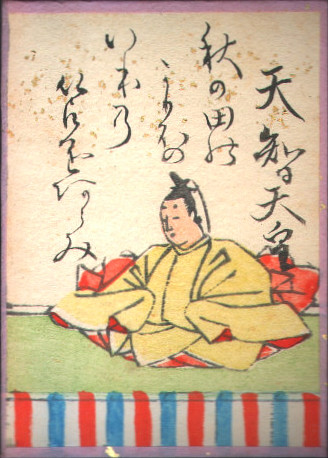
The karuta card of the Emperor Tenji's opening tanka poem for Ogura Hyakunin Isshu

A Water Clock Festival, Rokoku-sai, held in honor of the first water clock in Japan installed at the shrine, takes place around June 9–10, the day when the water clock is thought to have been installed. The preceding day features a Japanese tea ceremony performed by the Sen Sōshitsu, grand tea master of the Urasenke, one of the three san-Senke.

The Japanese national championship competitive karuta tournament, Karuta Matsuri, takes place here every January, on the first Saturday and Sunday after the New Year holiday. The Grand Champions are awarded the title Meijin (men's division) and Queen (women's division), and a seven-time Grand Champion is known as an Eternal Master. The national championship for high school students is held every July. The tournaments take place here as Emperor Tenji composed the first poem of the Ogura Hyakunin Isshu poetry collection forming the basis of the game.

Another annual festival, Reisai, is held on 20 April, the anniversary of Otsu establishment as the capital during Emperor Tenji reign.

=== The list of annual celebrations and events ===
The following recurring events take place at the Omi Shrine:

- January 1 (from 0 a.m.): Saitainsai (歳旦祭, "New Year's festival")
- January 1 (from 7 a.m.): Hatsuhinode Yōhaishiki (初日の出遙拝式, "Service of worshipping toward the first sunrise")
- January 2 (from 8:30 a.m.): Nikku Hajimesai (日供始祭, "Opening festival whereby ambrosia is offered to the deity")
- January 2 (from 8:30 a.m.): Genshisai (元始祭, "Shinto festival of origins to think back myths about founding of Japan in all sincerity")
- January 7 (from 9 a.m.): Shōwa Tennō-sai Yohaishiki (昭和天皇祭遙拝式, "Service of worshipping for Emperor Shōwa")
- January 10 (from 8:30 a.m.): Tenji Tennō-sai (天智天皇祭, "The festival to honor Emperor Tenji)
- January 11: Karuta Meijin-i Queen-i Ketteisen (かるた名人位クイーン位決定戦, "Karuta Meijin and Queen championship match")
- January 12 (from 9 a.m.): Karuta Matsuri (かるた祭, "Karuta Festival")
- January 12–13: Takamatsu-no-Miya Kinenhai Uta-garuta Taikai (高松宮記念杯歌かるた大会, "Prince Takamatsu Memorial Cup Uta-garuta Tournament ")
- January 15 (from 10 a.m.): Koshinsatsu syounou-sai (古神札焼納祭, "Ceremony of Burning Shinsatsu (Ofuda: a type of household amulet or talisman)")
- February 3 (from 10 a.m.): Setsubun-sai (節分祭, "The festival on the day before the beginning of Spring")
- February 11 (from 10 a.m.): Kigensetsu-sai (紀元節祭, "Festival to celebrate the day of a Jinmu Emperor's reign recall myths about founding of Japan)
- February 23 (from 9:30 a.m.): Ritsuryō-sai (律令祭, "Festival to recall the Ōmi Code, the first Japanese legal code, which consists of 22 volumes, established by Emperor Tenji)
- March 1 (from 9 a.m.): Kangaku-sai (勧学祭, "The festival to honor Emperor Tenji who promoted studies and established an education system")
- March 17 (from : 11 a.m.): Kinen-sai (祈年祭, "The festival to pray for the productiveness of grain")
- March 21: Shunbun no Hi (春分の日, "Vernal Equinox Holiday")
- April 19 (from 4 p.m.): Yomiya-sai (宵宮祭; "Chokushi (imperial envoys) come to the Omi shrine and pray for the reisai of the next day")
- April 20: Reisai (例祭; "Omi reisai is one of Chokusai (festivals held by Imperial ordinance) and commemorate the day when Emperor Tenji transferred the capital to an inland area, Omi Otsu no Miya, in 667.)
- April 20 (from 2 p.m.): Omi Matsuri (近江まつり, "Omi festival")
- April 29 (from 9:30 a.m.): Shōwa-sai (昭和祭, "Showa festival to recall the Shōwa Era and honor the Shōwa emperor")
- May (from 11 a.m.): Sōfukuji Tinkon Kuyou sai (崇福寺鎮魂供養祭, "")
- June 9 (from 10 a.m.): Kenka-sai (献茶祭, "The tea-offering festival")
- June 10 (from 11 a.m.): Rokoku-sai (漏刻祭, "The rōkoku (water clock) festival")
- June 12 (from 4:30 a.m.): Raijin-sai (雷神祭, "The festival to remember the punishment from the kami of thunder (Raijin) in 1975)
- June (4th Sunday) (from 11 a.m.): Kenka Kensentyasai (献菓献煎茶祭, "The sweets- and sencha (tea)-offering festival")
- June 30 (from 11 a.m.): Kyoen-sai (饗宴祭, "Feast")
- July 7 (from 11 a.m.): Nensui-sai (燃水祭, "The festival to recall the day when Koshi Province present reburnable water and clay to Emperor Tenji")
- July 20–21: Zenkoku Kōtōgakkō Karuta Senshuken Taikai (全国高等学校かるた選手権大会, "All Japan High School Ogura Hyakunin Isshu Karuta Tournament (Karuta Koshien)")
- July 30: (大祓式, "Grand purification rite")
- August 24 (from 11 a.m.): Kōbun Tennō-sai (弘文天皇祭, "the Emperor Kōbun festival")
- August 24 (from 1 p.m.): Kensho-sai (献書祭, "The book-offering festival" to recall the tradition of Omi which produce a lot of Shosei (a respectful way to call great calligraphers) such as Saichō and Ono no Tōfū.)
- September 8 (from 3 p.m.): Mitsuki-sai (観月祭, "The festival to enjoy the great bright moon")
- September 15 (from 9:30 a.m.): Keirō-sai (敬老祭, "The festival to respect the old")
- September 23: Shūbun no Hi (秋分の日, "Autumnal Equinox Day")
- October 17 (from 9:30 a.m.): Kanname Hōsyuku-sai (神嘗奉祝祭, "The festival to honor the Kannamesai Festival, which is the annual harvest festival of the Ise Grand Shrine")
- November 1 (from 12 p.m.): Kikka-sai (菊花祭, "The Chrysanthemum flower festival")
- November 3 (from 0:30 p.m.): Yabusame Shiniji (流鏑馬神事, "Yabusame rite")
- November 7 (from 11 a.m.): Gochinza Kinen-sai (御鎮座記念祭, "The festival commemorating the day of enshrinement of Omi shrine")
- December 1 (from 10 a.m.): Hatsuhokō Taisai (初穂講大祭, "The festival to dedicate the first crops to the Omi shrine")
- December 13: Kadomatsu date (門松立て, "Kadomatsu (New Year's pine decoration) stands on either side of the Rōmon")
- December 20 (from 9:30 a.m.): Susuharai-sai (煤払祭, "The cleaning ritual")
- December 23 (from 10 a.m.): Tenchōsetsu-sai (天長節祭, "The festival for the Emperor's Birthday")
- December 31 (from 3:30 p.m.): Joya-sai (除夜祭, "New Year's Eve festival")
- December 31: Ōharaeshiki (大祓式, "Grand purification rite")
- on the 1st, 10th and 20th of the month (from : a.m.): Tukinami no Matsuri (月次祭, "Monthly festival")
- on the 1st of the month: Kōtsū Anzen Kigan-sai (交通安全祈願祭, "The Pray-Traffic-Safety festival")
- on the 27th of the month: Tinka-sai (鎮火祭, "fire-extinguishing festival")
- on the 28th of the month: Suinansya Irei-sai (水難者慰霊祭, "The service for the consolation of souls of casualties from drowning accidents")
