= Sūfuku-ji (Ōtsu) =

Sūfuku-ji temple ruins
- 崇福寺跡 (Japanese)
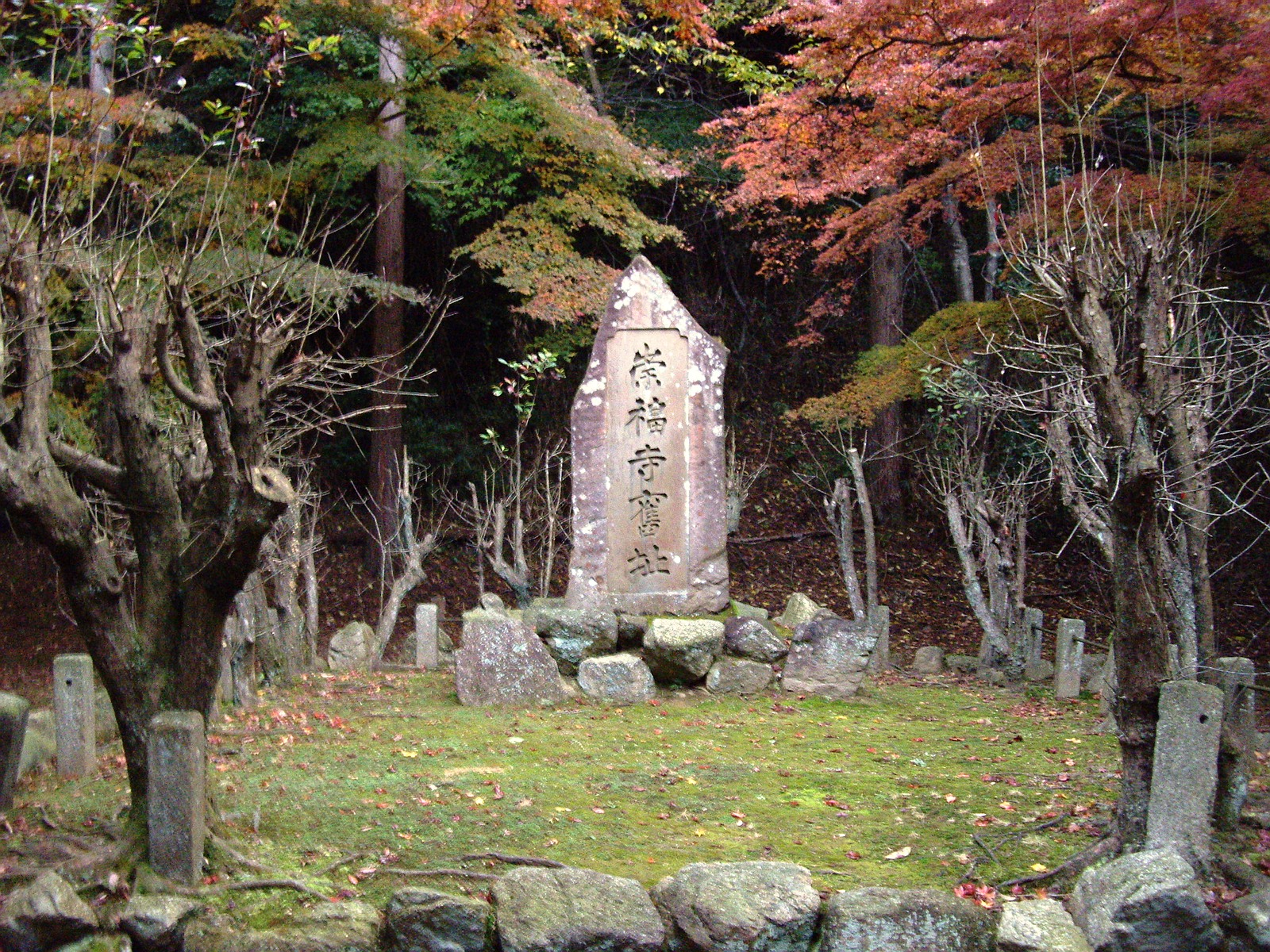
- Sūfuku-ji temple ruins

- Minamishigachō temple ruins Sūfuku-ji (Ōtsu) (Japan)
- 35°02′40.55″N 135°50′47.13″E
- Type: temple ruins
- Periods: Asuka period
- Location: Ōtsu, Shiga, Japan
- Region: Kansai region

Site notes
- Public access: Yes (no public facilities)

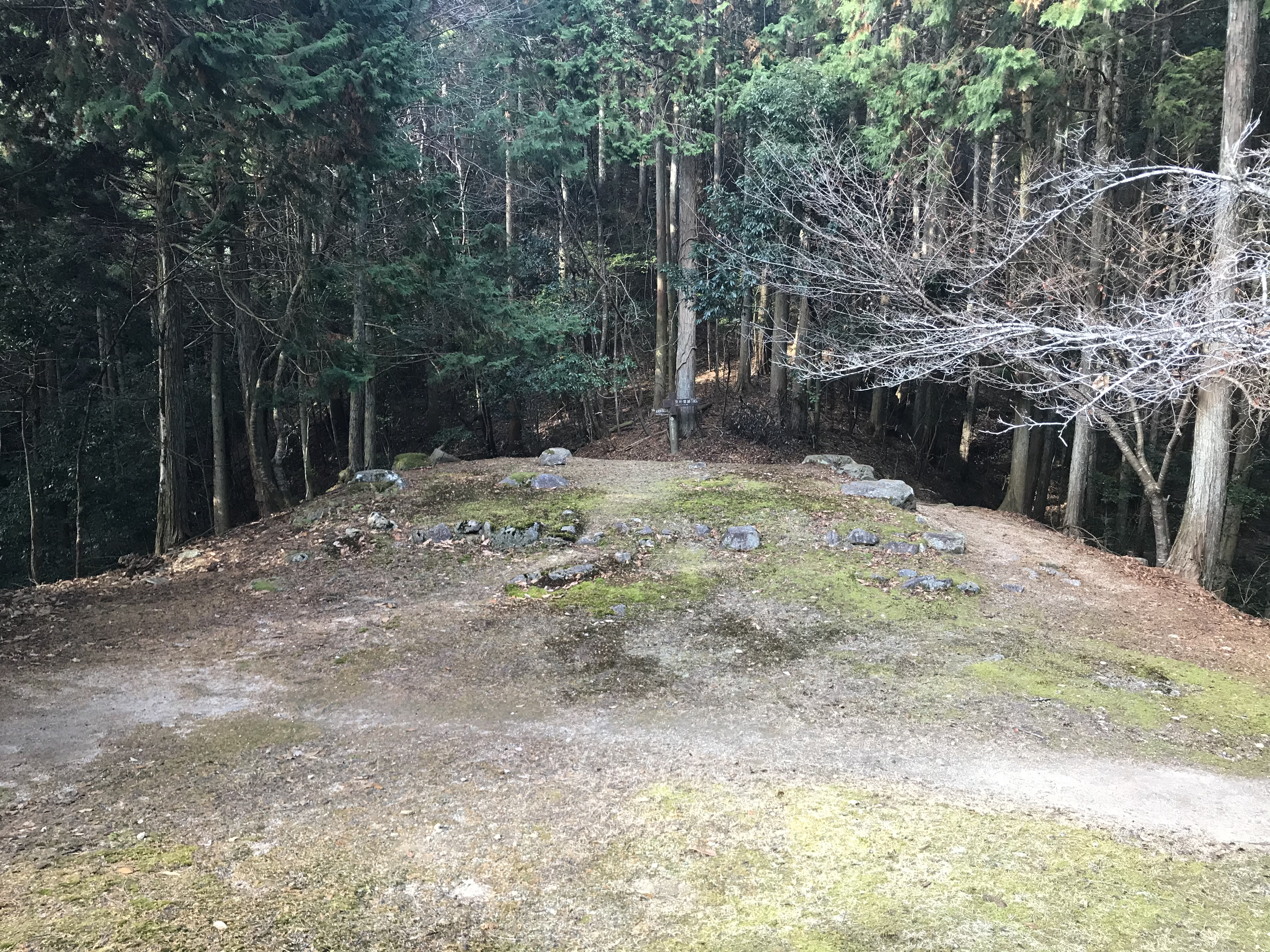
Site of the Kondō of Sūfuku-ji

The Sūfuku-ji temple ruins (崇福寺跡, Sūfuku ato) is an archaeological site with the ruins of a late Asuka through Muromachi period Buddhist temple located in the Shigasato neighborhood of the city of Ōtsu,Shiga Prefecture, in the Kansai region of Japan. The site was designated a National Historic Site of Japan in 1941, and some of the artifacts recovered from the site are collectively designated as a National Treasure.

== Overview ==
Archaeological excavations indicate that the temple ruins are located on three ridges extending south from Mount Hiei. The north ridge contains the Miroku-do, a chapel dedicated to Maitreya. The middle ridge (also known as "Maruyama") contains the small Kondō and the south ridge has the main temple complex itself, including the foundations of the Kondō, Lecture Hall, and Kyōzō (Sutra library). The site also encompasses the Hyakuana Kofun cluster and the Nagao Tile Kiln ruins; however, the site has not been excavated since its designation as a National Historic Site, so there is much about its layout which remains unknown.

=== Identification controversy ===
The history of the excavation of the site is inseparable from the controversy involving the search for the location of the Ōmi Ōtsu Palace. It is known in historical records that Emperor Tenchi relocated the capital of Japan to Ōtsu and resided there for a brief period from 667 to 672 AD. However, the exact location of the palace became lost in later centuries, and especially with growing nationalism in the late Meiji era and the Taisho era, there was a strong desire to relocate it. As the palace existed for only five years and did not make use of roof tiles, it was decided that physical evidence may not have survived, and that the location of the palace site might be derived from the locations of the temples of Sūfuku-ji and Bonshaku-ji, which ancient sources indicate were in the vicinity.

In 1897, a local historian promoted a theory that the "Shigasato Yamanaka site" corresponded to the site of Sūfuku-ji, and based on this theory, a stone monument to that effect was erected in 1918. However, around the same time, the Minamishigachō temple ruins with tiles from the Hakuho period and the foundation of a pagoda were found. Archaeologists were divided, with some postulating that the Minamishigachō temple ruins was Bonshaku-ji, which it was further postulated had been erected by Emperor Kanmu on the site of the Ōmi Ōtsu Palace. Others argued that the Minamishigachō temple ruins corresponded to Sūfuku-ji as Hakuho period roof tiles had been excavated at that location. In an effort to settle the controversy, Shiga Prefecture sponsored excavations from 1938 to 1945 which only further inflamed the controversy.

The "Shigasato Yamanaka site" yielded no artifacts earlier than the Heian period, although the layout of buildings appeared to correspond to what was known of Sūfuku-ji. It was only after a landslide and further excavations revealed Hakuho period tiles, a Buddha image, and the foundations of a pagoda that the controversy was officially resolved in favor of "Shigasato Yamanaka site" being the site of Sūfuku-ji. Regarding the Minamishigachō site, this was arbitrarily explained as a predecessor temple in between the period when the Ōmi Ōtsu Palace was destroyed and the construction of Bonshaku-ji on the site of the palace ruins. However, this was not the end of the controversy, which extended well into the postwar period. It is now current dogma that Sūfuku-ji occupied the northern and central ridges of the site and Bonshaku-ji was on the southern ridge, whereas the Minamishigachō site is an entirely unknown Hakuho period temple. This is supported by roof tiles inscribed with the kanji "Bon" found on the southern ridge.

== History ==
Sūfuku-ji is also referred to as Shigayama-dera or Risshaku-ji in ancient literature. It is claimed to have been founded in 667 AD, when Emperor Tenchi had a dream about a sacred cave in the mountains, which when excavated was found to contain a treasure trove of what appear to have been dotaku. The "Fuso Ryakuki" states that the temple was built in honor of his parents, Emperor Jomei and Empress Kōgyoku, and the "Enryaku Monkoku" adds that it was due to Emperor Tenchi's faith in Miroku Bosatsu.

Emperor Tenchi's memorial service was held at the temple, indicating its high status. The memorial service for his grandson, Prince Kusakabe was also held here in 689 AD. The temple is mentioned in the Nihon Shoki as receiving the patronage of the imperial court as an official government temple from 701 through 729 AD. Emperor Shōmu is recorded as visiting the temple in 740 AD, and Emperor Kanmu in 786 AD. In 798 AD it was designated as one of the ten great imperial temples alongside Tōdai-ji and Kofuku-ji.

By the Heian period, the temple had established strong connections with Mii-dera and was thus drawn into that temple's perennial conflict with Enryaku-ji. Sūfuku-ji burned down five times during the Heian period, and although rebuilt, each time it was rebuilt on a smaller scale and eventually became subsidiary of Mii-dera. by the middle of the Kamakura period, the Enryakuji Gokoku Engi states that "there is no trace of Sūfuku Temple", but this is either an exaggeration, or else the temple had relocated from its previous location, as its name continued to appear in various historical documents into the Muromachi period.

== Artifacts ==
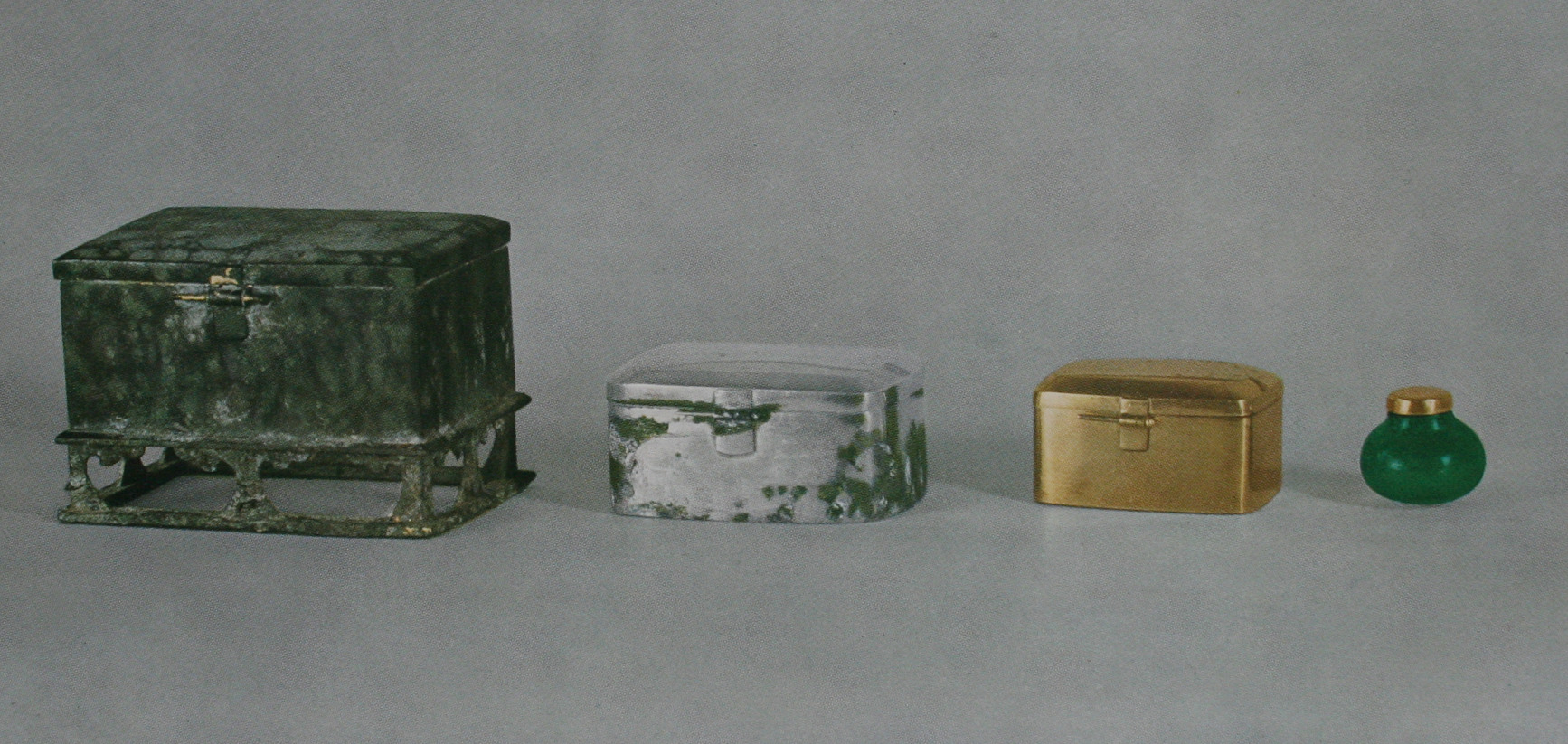
shari container

During the 1945 excavation, a shari container was found buried within the pagoda foundation. This was a box containing smaller silver and gold boxes within, and a crystal container housing a Buddhist relic. It was designated a National Treasure in 1952. It is currently owned by Omi Shrine and is stored at the Kyoto National Museum.

The discovery of this container was controversial. The contractor hired to survey and excavate the pagoda foundation had worked on a previous site and knew of the possibility that it contained some type of buried treasure. Digging the site on his own, he presented the container to the archaeologists, who were amazed that an amateur apparently knew exactly where to look. However, after demanding to examine the exact location from which the container was recovered, it was soon realized that other objects were missing. After police interrogation, the contractor and his local accomplices admitted to robbing the site, and a mirror and several silver coins were recovered, but other objects which had been stolen were lost.

The shari container is a quadruple container that contains a lapis lazuli bottle in a triple-nested box. The outer box is made of cast bronze and is plated. The box and lid were separately cast and connected with fasteners on the front and back. The dimensions are 10 cm long, 7.4 cm wide, and 7.6 cm high (including 2.4 cm leg height), with two legs on each side.

The inner box is made of silver plate, the lid is a single plate embossed, and the box is made by bending one plate to make the side of the box and sticking another plate on the bottom. The lid has fasteners on the front and back, and a pin with a jewel to seal it. The dimensions are 8 cm long, 5.6 cm wide, and 4 cm high, with an overall rounded shape.

The innermost box is made of gold plate, and the shape and manufacturing method are similar to the inner box. The dimensions are 6.2 cm long, 4.3 cm wide, and 3.4 cm high. Inside, there is a stud to hold the jar, which is flower-shaped with 8 petals bordered with a flower-shaped dotted line carving, a similar motif to objects from the Kofun period and early Asuka period found on Okinoshima and at Hōryū-ji.

The lapis lazuli bottle has a diameter of 3 cm, a height of 3 cm, and a diameter of 1.8 cm, and is dark green. Gold leaf was pressed against the rim and covered with a gold lid. It seems that the bottle had collapsed when it was excavated, and it was found in the inner box. The shrine was crystal and had three grains of 1 mm or less. The outer and inner boxes were filled with plaster-like mud, and two amethyst and 14 perforated Nanjing balls were found. The mud seems to be remnants of incense. Twelve silver coins (one of which was lost) were excavated from the outside of the box. The silver coins are uninscribed and have a diameter of 3 cm and a weight of about 10 g, and are drilled with holes.

The accompanying iron mirror has a diameter of 7 cm, with a gold-copper plate is attached to the back and fastened with a silver edge. The back is arabesque and has a design with a fish. A mirror similar to this has been excavated from the Matsuyama Kofun in Nara Prefecture. In addition, two bells, three jadeite beads, and many rotten pieces of wood were excavated. The number of roof tiles which has been found at the site is very small, as most buildings were covered with wooden shingles rather than tiles. The tiles found date from the Heian period and were made at the Nagao roof tile kiln site located about 550 meters to the southeast.

The site is located about a 20-minute walk from the Minami-Shiga Station on the Keihan Electric Railway Ishiyama Sakamoto Line.

== See also ==
- List of Historic Sites of Japan (Shiga)
