= Museum of Shiga Prefecture Biwako-Bunkakan =

Museum in Ōtsu, Shiga Prefecture, Japan

Coordinates: 35.0081°N 135.8741°E

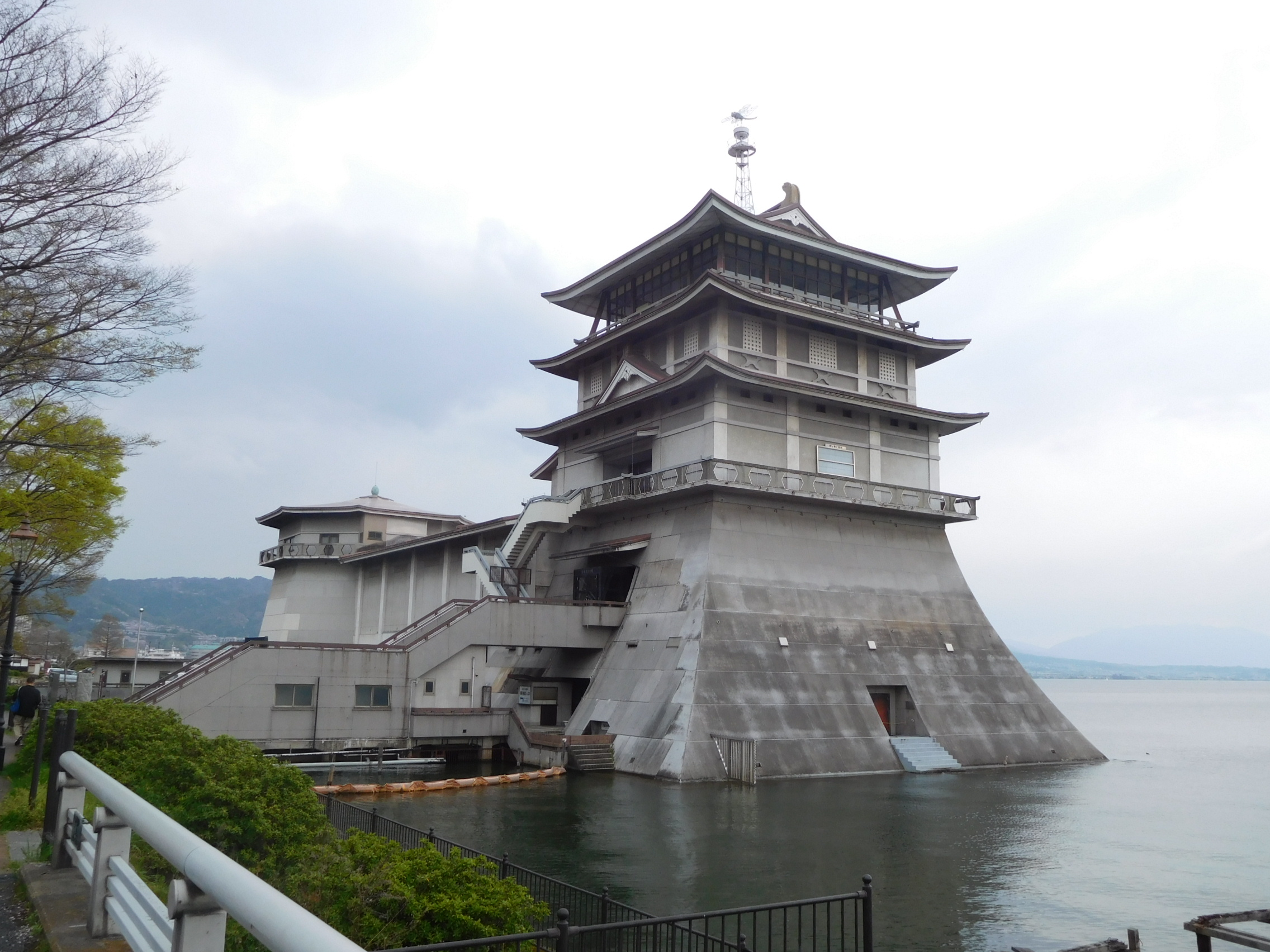
The Museum of Shiga Prefecture Biwako-Bunkakan

The Museum of Shiga Prefecture Biwako-Bunkakan (滋賀県立琵琶湖文化館) is a museum in the capital city of Shiga Prefecture, Japan.

First opened in November 1948 as the Shiga Prefecture Sangyou-Bunkakan, the Museum of Shiga Prefecture Biwako-Bunkakan formally came into existence in 1961. It was closed in 2008 before having its collections taken over by the Museum of Modern Art, Shiga. It was closed for renovations in March, 2021.

== Building Layout ==
- 1st Floor - Gallery
- 2nd Floor - Planned Exhibitions, Exhibitions on Buddhism
- 3rd Floor - Themed Exhibition Room, Early Modern Era Displays, Modern Era Displays
- 4th Floor - Panel Display Room, Lake Biwa and Omi Culture Exhibitions
- 5th Floor - Observation Deck
