= Asuka-dera =

Buddhist temple in Japan

- 飛鳥寺
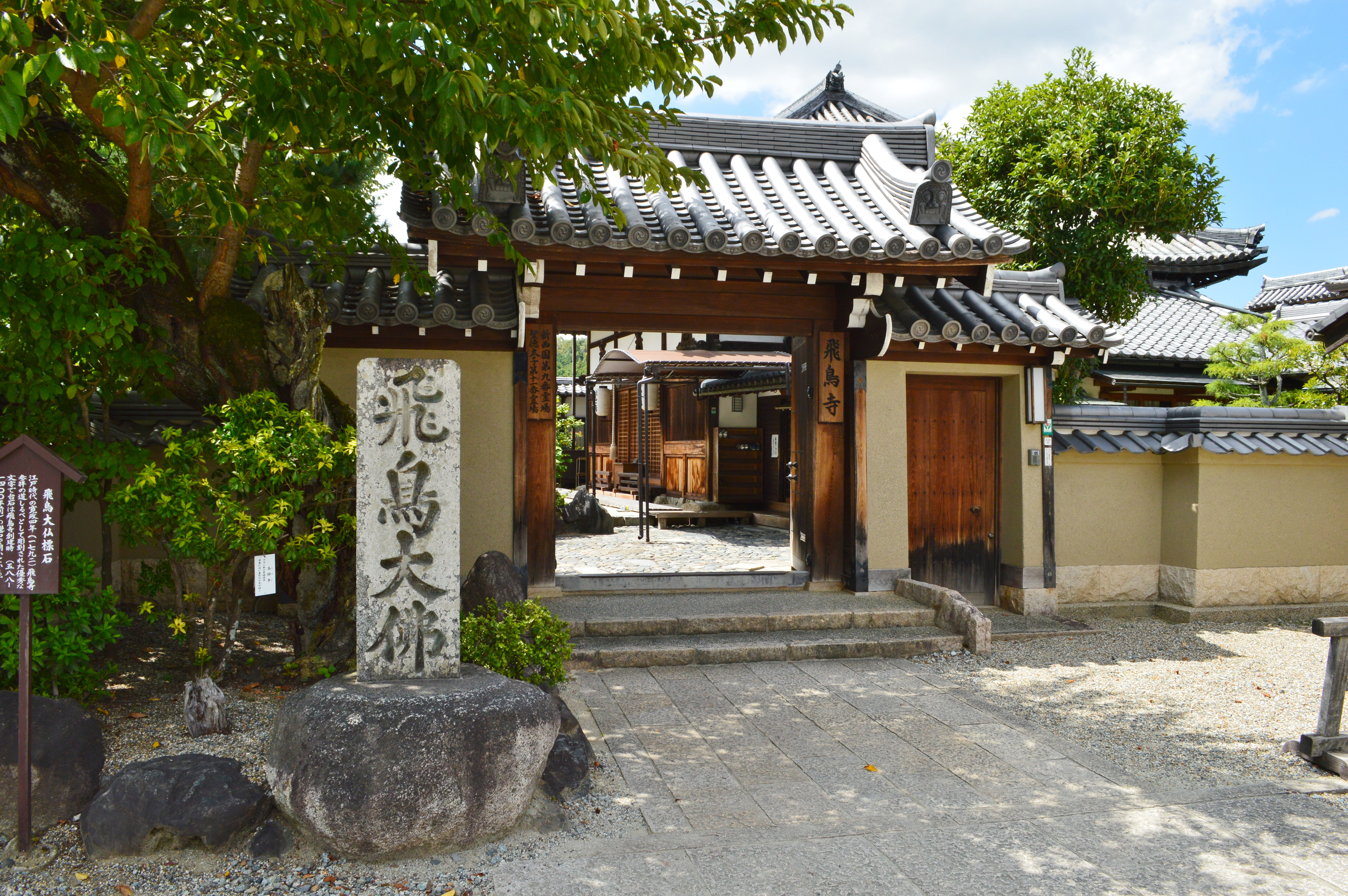
- Asuka-dera Sanmon

- Location within Nara Prefecture Location within Japan

Religion
- Affiliation: Buddhist
- Deity: Gautama Buddha
- Rite: Shingon-shu Buzan-ha
- Status: functional

Location
- Location: 682 Asuka, Asuka-mura, Takaichi-gun, Nara-ken
- Country: Japan
- Coordinates: 34°28′43.14″N 135°49′12.64″E

Architecture
- Founder: Soga no Umako
- Completed: c.596

Website
- Official website
- National Historic Site

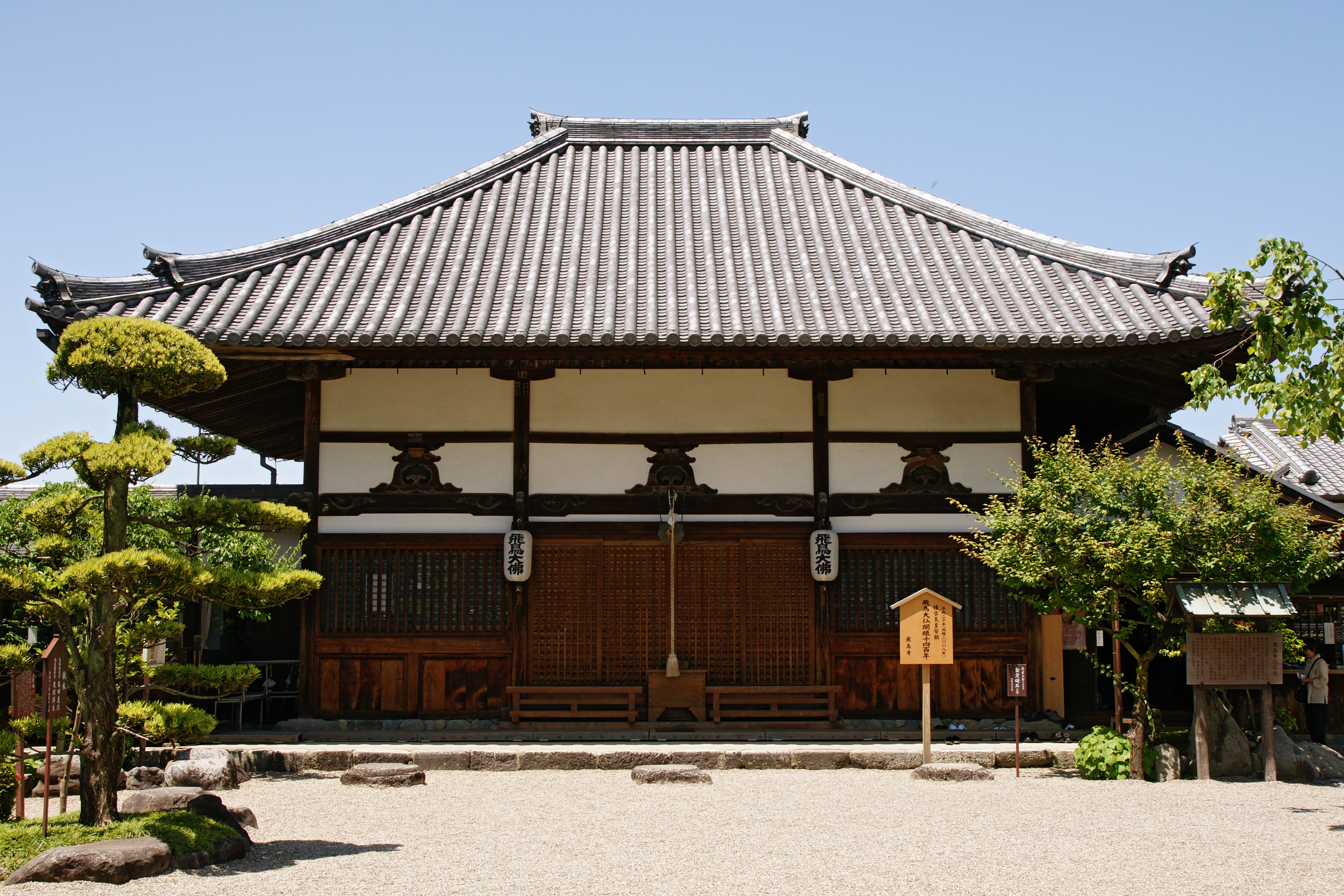
Front of the Main Hall at Asuka-dera, Asuka, Nara

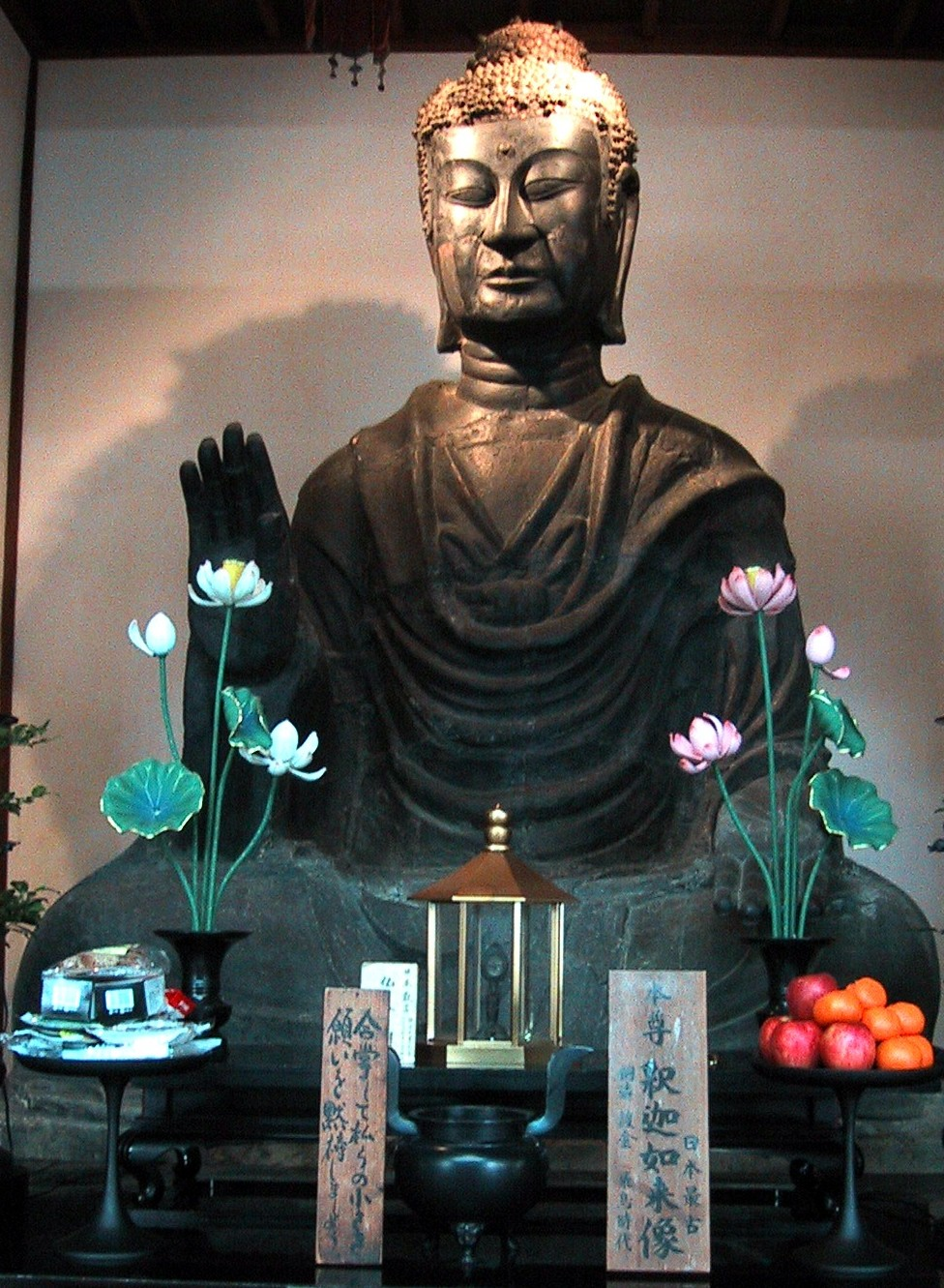
Great Buddha of Asuka-dera

Asuka-dera (飛鳥寺), also known as Hōkō-ji (法興寺), is a Buddhist temple located in the village of Asuka, Nara Prefecture, Japan. It currently belongs to the Shingon-shū Buzan-ha sect. Asuka-dera is regarded as one of the oldest temples in Japan. Its precincts were designated a National Historic Site in 1966, and registered as a World Heritage Site under Ancient Capitals of Asuka and Fujiwara in July, 2026.

== History ==
Asuka-dera (Hōkō-ji) was built as the family temple of the Soga clan between the end of the 6th century and the beginning of the 7th century, and was the first Buddhist temple in Japan to have a fully-fledged temple complex. The history of the temple's construction from its inception to its founding is described in the Nihon Shoki, the Gangō-ji Garan Engi and Ryūki Zaizaichō, as well as other historical sources. According to the Nihon Shoki, the construction of Hōkō-ji (Asuka-dera) was instigated by Soga no Umako in the second year of the reign of Emperor Yōmei (587). Umako was opposed to the anti-Buddhist Mononobe no Moriya. Soga no Umako vowed to build a temple in Asuka should he defeat the Mononobe. On the other hand, although the Gangō-ji Garan Engi, compiled in 747, agrees that the year was 587, it gives an account of three nuns (Zenshin-ni, Zenzō-ni, and Ezen-ni) who wanted to travel to Baekje to receive the ordination. However, a "guest from Baekje" advised that since Japan did not have any temples for monks, they should invite Baekje monks to Japan instead. Emperor Yōmei then ordered Empress Suiko and Prince Shōtoku to search for land to build a temple.

According to the "Nihon Shoki," in the first year of the following Emperor Sushun's reign (588), monks and technicians (two temple craftsmen, one file-making expert, four roof tile experts, and one painter) were sent from Baekje to Japan. Of these, the file-making expert is thought to have been a craftsman in charge of metal parts such as the spire on the roof of the pagoda. In the same first year of the Emperor Sushun's reign, the mansion of Asuka Kinunui no Miyatsuko no Oya Konoha, located in Makamihara, Asuka, was demolished and construction of Hōkō-ji began. An entry in the "Nihon Shoki" states that construction was actually started in October 592. The entry for January 15th of the first year of the reign of Empress Suiko (February 21, 593) in the "Nihon Shoki" states that "the relics were placed in the foundation of the setsubashira (the central pillar of the pagoda) of Hōkō-ji". As a result of archaeological excavations in 1957 of the pagoda foundations, it was confirmed that a relic container had indeed been buried in the foundation stone (the central pillar of the pagoda).

In the entry for November of the 4th year of the reign of Empress Suiko (596), the Nihon Shoki states that "Hōkō-ji Temple was completed." The Nihon Shoki goes on to say that Soga no Umako's son Zentoku became the temple's administrator, and two monks, Keiji (a monk from Goguryeo) and Keisou (a monk from Baekje), began to live there. The date of 596 is also cited in the Gangō-ji Garan Engi. However, the construction of the Shaka Triad, the principal image of Asuka-dera Temple, was initiated nine years later, in the 13th year of the reign of Empress Suiko (605), and the statue was completed even later than that, meaning that although the temple existed, it apparently either lacked a principal image for several years, or a stone image of Miroku Bosatsu brought over from Baekje in 584 and owned by Soga no Umako was originally the principal image.

With regards to the Shaka Triad at Asuka-dera, per the Nihon Shoki, in the 13th year of the reign of Empress Suiko (605), the empress issued an edict to the crown prince (Prince Shōotoku), the minister (Soga no Umako), and the ministers, requesting the construction of a bronze statue of the Buddha. Upon hearing this, King Daeheung of Goryeo offered 300 ryō of gold as a tribute. According to the "Nihon Shoki," the bronze "180-cm Buddha" was completed the following year. When the statue was to be placed in the Golden Hall of Asuka-dera, it was found to be taller than the door and would not fit inside. However, thanks to the ingenuity of the craftsmen, it was possible to place the statue without destroying the door. According to the "Jorokukoumei," the Sui envoy Pei Shiqing and others came to Japan in 608 and presented offerings of gold, with which the statue was completed in 609.

During the Asuka period, the temple was central to the development of Buddhism in Japan, with many immigrant monks from Baekje, Goguryeo, and China. Although primarily a center of the Sanron sect, the head priest Dōshō travelled to Tang China, from which he brought back Chan Buddhism, laying the foundations for Japanese Zen. As the temple in effect functioned as a research institute for Buddhist teachings, it eventually came to be protected by the Imperial Court. This enabled the temple to survive the destruction of the Soga clan during the 645 Isshi Incident, and it also served as the meeting place between Prince Nakano Ōe and Nakatomi no Kamatari. During the reign of Emperor Tenmu, an imperial decree was issued to treat it as an equivalent to an official government temple. During the reign of Emperor Mommu, it was designated one of the "four great temples" along with Daikandai-ji, Kawara-dera, and Yakushi-ji.

When the capital moved to Heijō-kyō, Asuka-dera also relocated, becoming Gangō-ji. The Shoku Nihongi records that the move occurred in 716, but a subsequent entry for 718 repeats the record, so it is uncertain which date is correct. Despite the relocation, the original temple in Asuka continued to exist under the name "Hon-Gangō-ji", and even in the Heian period, the imperial court treated it as second only to the "Seven Great Temples of Nara". The Hon Gangō-ji Engi, written in the Edo period, states that it burned down in 887, but no other records remain. The temple fell on hard times around the 11th century. The Jogū Taishi Shūiki records that in 1158, the temple sold a stone statue of Maitreya Bodhisattva that had been brought from Baekje to Myōraku-ji (present-day Tanzan Shrine) in the face of famine. In 1196, the pagoda and main hall were burned down by lightning. The temple was practically abandoned after the Muromachi period. According to the "Taishiden Gyokurinsho" by the Hōryū-ji monk Kunkai, the principal image of Asuka-dera was placed in the open air as of 1447.

The history of the following 200 years is unclear. The "Gangoji An'oin Engi" (1699) states that a temporary hall was built by a philanthropist in 1632, and then in 1681, the monk Hideyoshi built a hermitage called An'yo-in and repaired the damaged Shaka Nyorai statue. The "Sugegasa Nikki" (Diary of a Man with a Hat) by the mid-Edo period scholar Motoori Norinaga describes his visit to Asuka in 1772, when he writes that Asuka-dera had "no gate or anything" and that the principal image of Shaka Nyorai was only placed in a "temporary hall." However, the temple continued to be mentioned in various guidebooks. The current main hall was constructed with the assistance of donations from Osaka in 1826.

== Temple complex ==
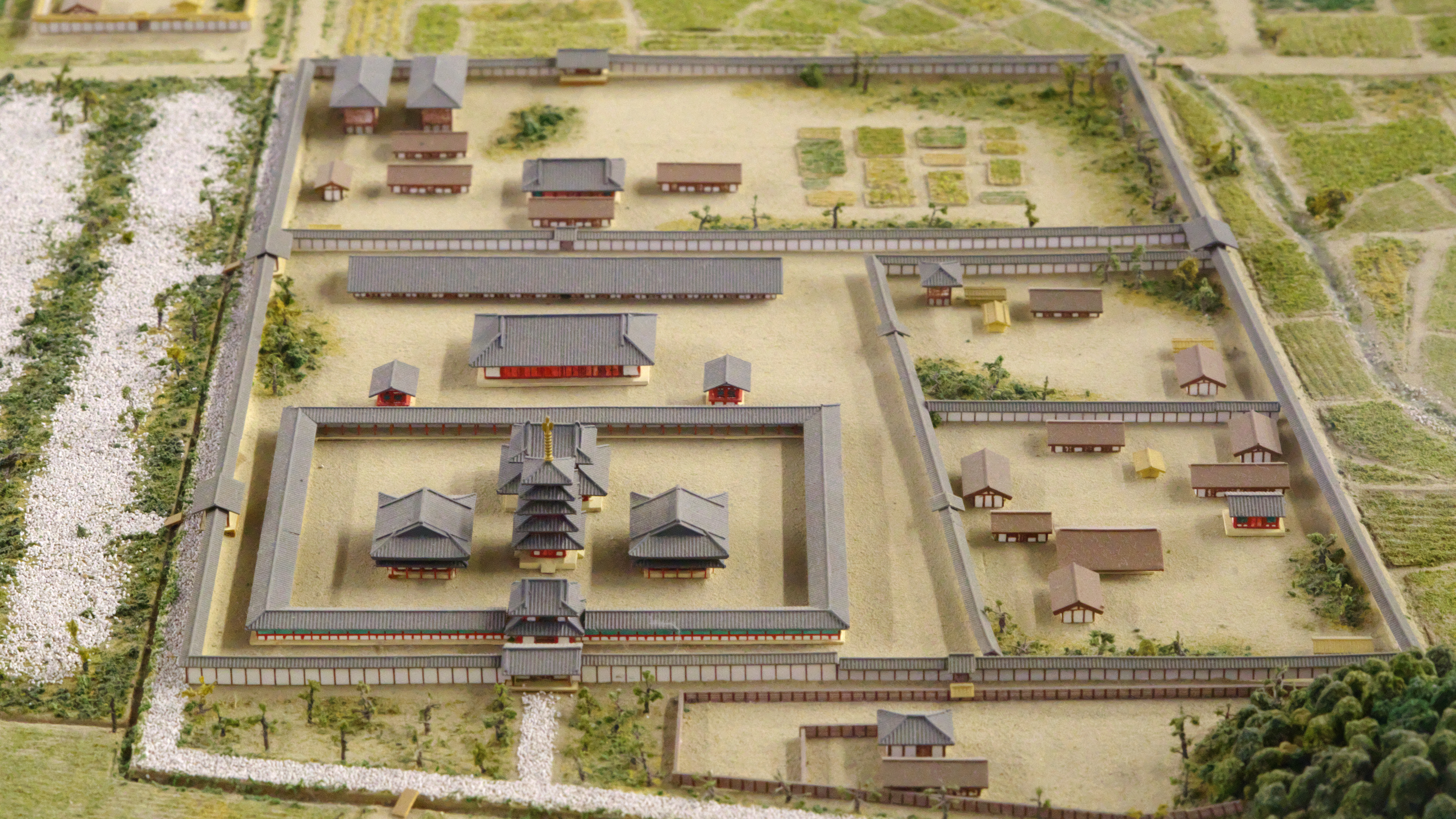
Model of Hōkō-ji Temple at the time of its construction. A part of the 1/1000 model of Fujiwara-kyō in the Kashihara-shi Fujiwara-kyō reference room.

Excavations conducted since 1956 have revealed the original temple complex. Before the excavation, the temple complex of Asuka-dera was thought to be of the Shitenno-ji style, but excavations from 1956 to 1957 confirmed that the original temple complex was of the one-pagoda, three-main hall style, with a Central Golden Hall, the Eastern Golden Hall, and Western Golden Hall. A corridor surrounded the pagoda and the three main halls, and the Central Gate was located on the south front of the corridor. The lecture hall was located on the north side outside the corridor. A wall of earthworks ran around the entire complex, and excavations have revealed that there was a South Gate just south of the Central Gate and a West Gate to the west.

The remains of the pagoda include a platform made of cut stones, steps, surrounding stone paving, and an underground core stone, but no other foundation stones remain. The core stone was placed 2.7 meters underground, and a hole for the reliquary was provided on the east wall of the square hole in the center. The reliquary container was removed and reburied after a fire in 1196, and the original container no longer exists, but during excavations, beads, gold rings, gold and silver plates, small scale armor, and knives were unearthed. The excavated items suggest that this temple is located on the border between the Kofun period and the Asuka period. From the processing marks on the core stone, it is thought that the central pillar was a square pillar with a side of about 1.5 meters.

The current location of the main hall of Asuka-dera is exactly the site of ancient Asuka-dera Central Golden Hall. The main object of worship at Asuka-dera is a bronze Great Buddha, which said to have been made by Kuratsukuri no Tori in the early seventh century. The statue is designated as an Important Cultural Property.

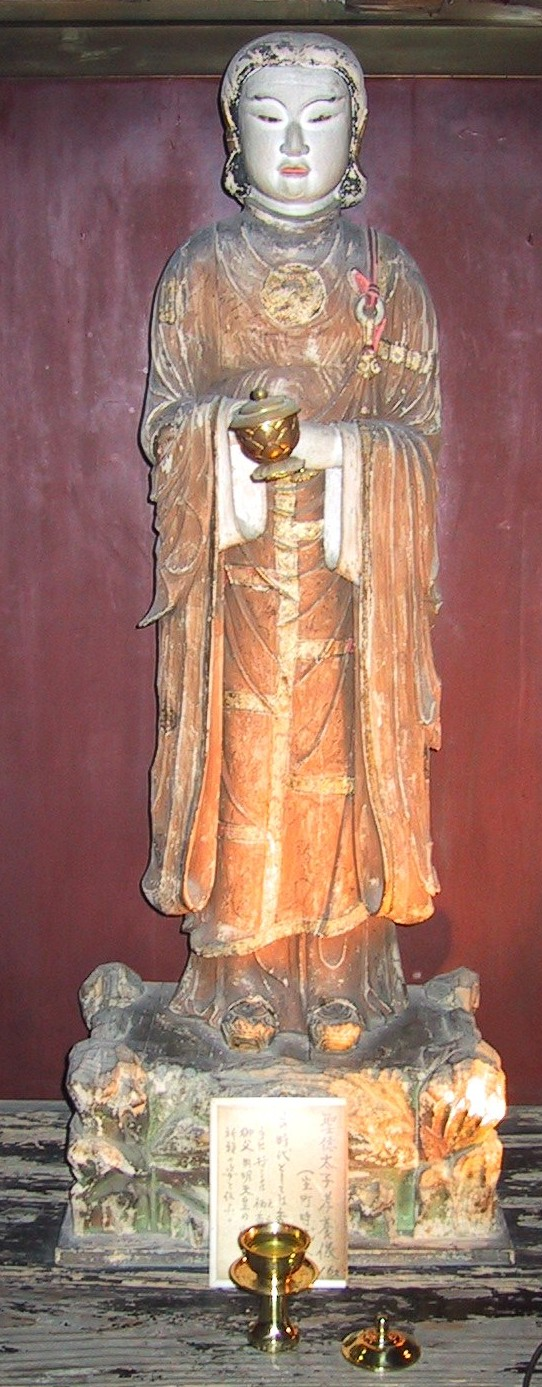
Sculpture of Prince Shōtoku depicted as a bodhisattva in Asuka-dera, Asuka, Nara

== See also ==
- Gangō-ji
- List of Historic Sites of Japan (Nara)
- Historical Sites of Prince Shōtoku

== Bibliography ==
- Aston, William G. (2005). Nihongi: Chronicles of Japan from the Earliest Times to A.D. 697. Tokyo: Charles E. Tuttle Company. ISBN 0-8048-3674-4
- Brown, Delmer M. and Ichirō Ishida, eds. (1979). [ Jien, c. 1220], Gukanshō (The Future and the Past, a translation and study of the Gukanshō, an interpretative history of Japan written in 1219). Berkeley: University of California Press. ISBN 0-520-03460-0
- Martin, John H. and Phyllis G. Martin. (1993). Nara: A Cultural Guide to Japan's Ancient Capital. Tokyo: Tuttle Publishing. ISBN 978-0-8048-1914-5
- Shimura, Izuru. (1998). Kōjien, 5th edition. Tokyo: Iwanami Shoten. ISBN 978-4-00-080111-9 (cloth)
- Ponsonby-Fane, Richard Arthur Brabazon. (1959). The Imperial House of Japan. Kyoto: Ponsonby Memorial Society. OCLC 194887
- Titsingh, Isaac, ed. (1834). [Siyun-sai Rin-siyo/Hayashi Gahō, 1652], Nipon o daï itsi ran; ou, Annales des empereurs du Japon. Paris: Oriental Translation Fund of Great Britain and Ireland.
- Varley, H. Paul, ed. (1980). [ Kitabatake Chikafusa, 1359], Jinnō Shōtōki ("A Chronicle of Gods and Sovereigns: Jinnō Shōtōki of Kitabatake Chikafusa" translated by H. Paul Varley). New York: Columbia University Press. ISBN 0-231-04940-4
