= Jōgū Shōtoku Hōō Teisetsu =

Manuscript biography of Prince Shōtoku

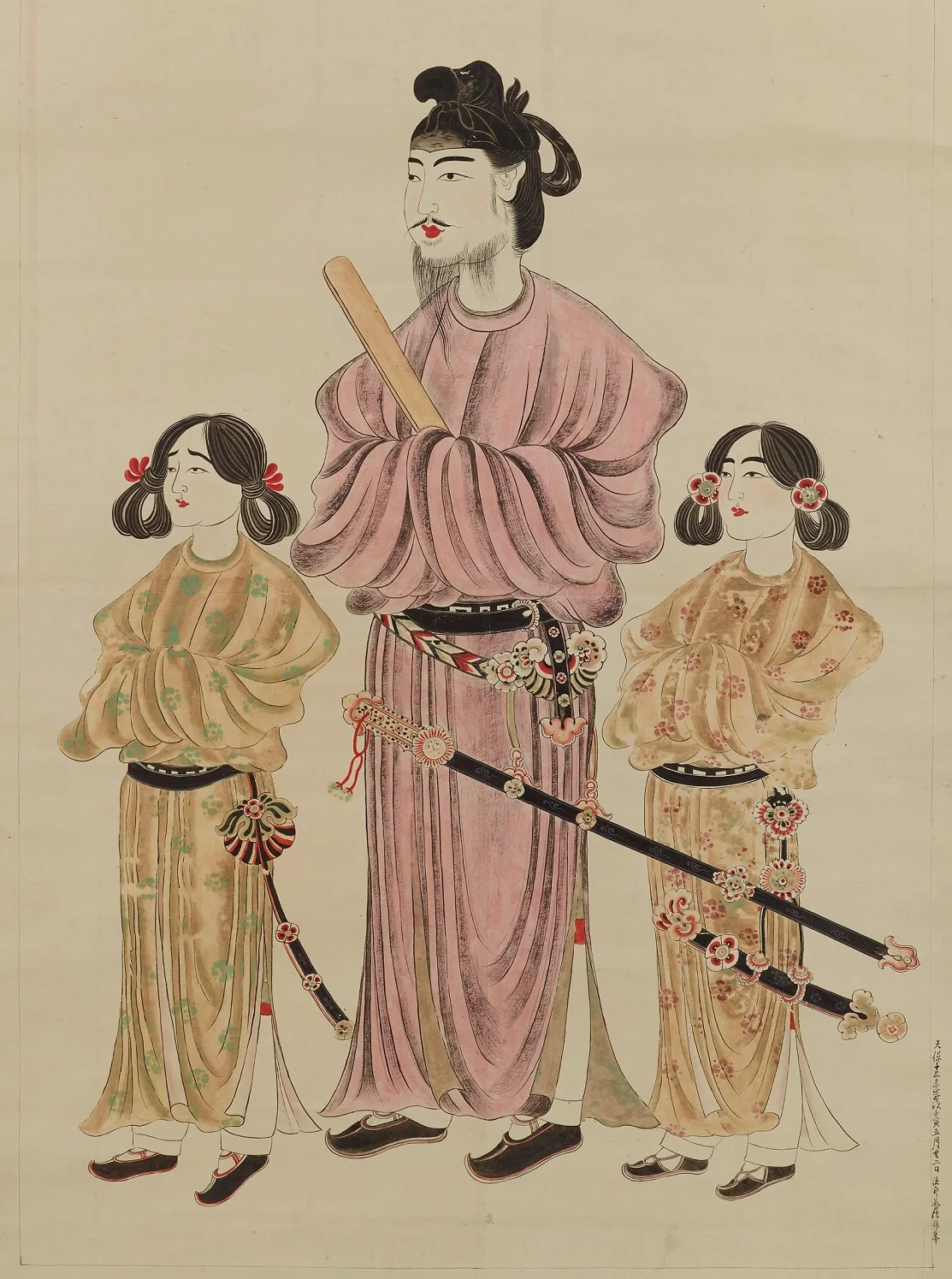
Prince Shotoku flanked by younger brother (left: Prince Eguri) and 1st son (right: Prince Yamashiro), Woodblock reproduction from an 8th-century painting

Jōgū Shōtoku Hōō Teisetsu (上宮聖徳法王帝説), also read as Jōgū Shōtoku Hōō Taisetsu, is a biography of Shōtoku Taishi. It is one scroll in length and is a National Treasure of Japan.

== Background ==
The author (or authors) of the text is unknown. It originally belonged to Hōryū-ji, but it was transferred to Chion-in in 1879.

The text consists of five distinct sections written over distinct time periods. In addition, the reverse side also contains some content.

While some parts seem to have been written by the early eighth century, the complete manuscript dates from around 1050.

== Contents ==
The first section lists Shōtoku's genealogy, including his mother and father, wife, and children. This is the oldest section and was written sometime before 701 or 708.

The second section describes his achievements. These include his Buddhist contributions such as his sutras as well as the enactment of the Twelve Level Cap and Rank System.

The third section contains the full text of three inscriptions:

- the Yakushi Nyorai status at Hōryū-ji
- the group of three Buddha known as Shaka Sanzon (釈迦三尊像) at Hōryū-ji
- the Tenjukoku Mandara embroidered curtain

Much of the text of the curtain is now lost, so this text is invaluable in reconstructing the missing text. It also contains three poems from Kose no Mitsue (巨勢三杖).

The fourth section contains a number of historical events. These include the introduction of Buddhism to Japan from Baekje, the creation of the Seventeen-article constitution, the destruction of the Yamashiro family by Soga no Emishi and Soga no Iruka, and the destruction of Soga no Emishi and Soga no Iruka by Naka-no-Ōe. This section was written between 708 and 715.

The fifth section details the reigns of five generations of rulers: Emperor Kinmei, Emperor Bidatsu, Emperor Yōmei, Emperor Sushun, and Empress Suiko. Included is the years of their reigns, death, and tomb information. Finally, it concludes with Shōtoku's own death.

The reverse side of the scroll contains details about Soga no Umako and the construction of the Yamada-dera and Han'nya-ji temples.

== See also ==
- List of National Treasures of Japan (writings: Japanese books)
