= Sakaibe no Marise =

Sakaibe no Marise (境部 摩理勢) (died 628) was a court aristocrat of the Asuka period of Japanese history, and member of the Soga clan. When Empress Suiko died in 628, Marise sought to place Prince Yamashiro, the son of Prince Shōtoku, on the Imperial throne. However, his nephew Soga no Emishi, a government minister, opposed him and ordered Marise killed, ensuring that his choice, Prince Tamura, would succeed Suiko.

Marise was a son of Soga no Iname, and brother to Soga no Umako.
