= Tori Busshi =

Japanese sculpture

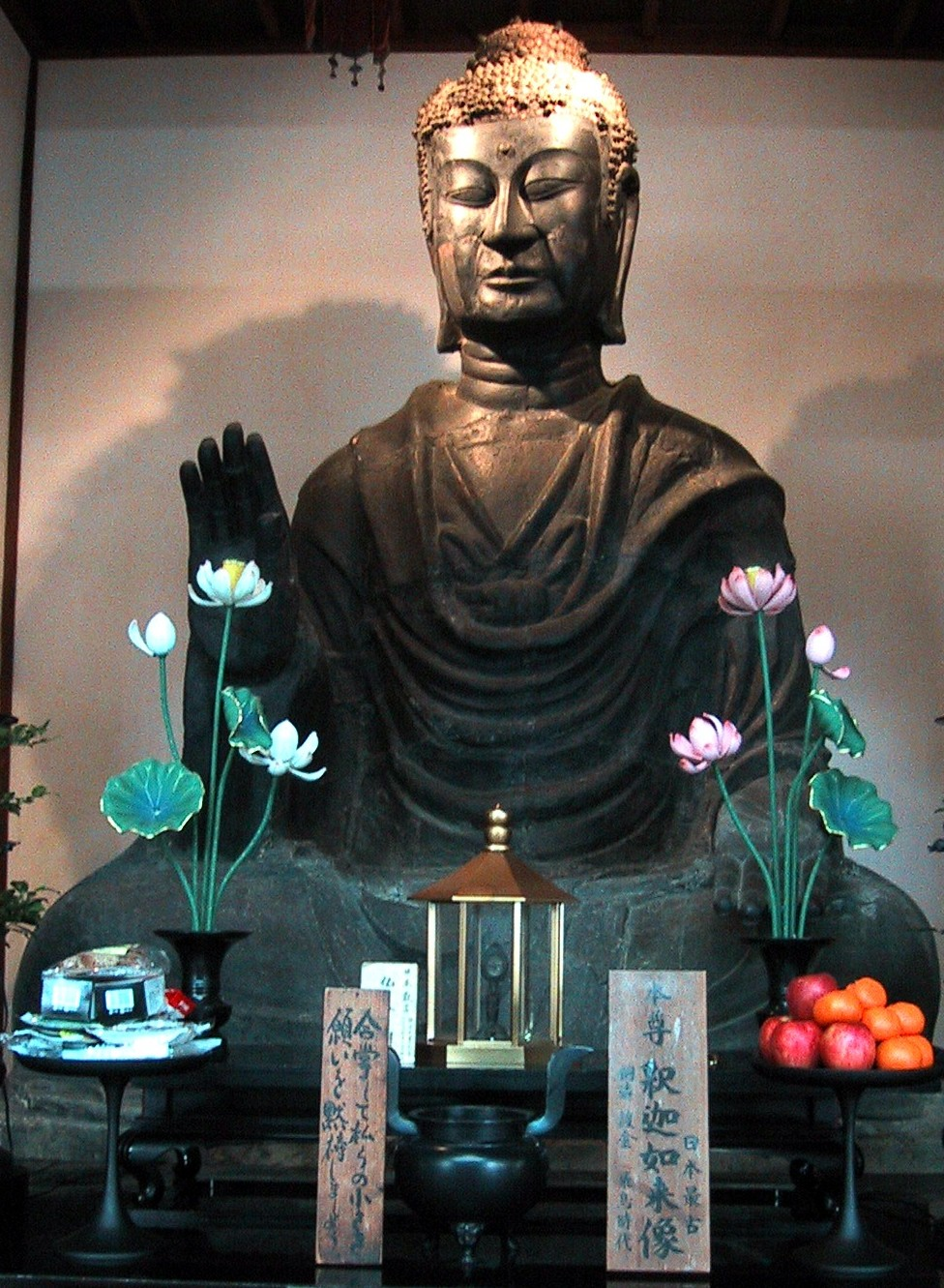
The Shaka image of Asukadera, sculpted by Tori Busshi in 606

Tori Busshi (止利仏師; トリ・ブッシ) was a Japanese sculptor active in the late 6th and early 7th century. He was from the Kuratsukuri (鞍作, "saddle-maker") clan, and his full title was Shiba no Kuratsukuri-be no Obito Tori Busshi (司馬鞍作部首止利仏師)); Busshi is a title meaning "the maker of Buddhist images". By the early 7th century, Tori Busshi had become the favorite sculptor of Soga no Umako and Prince Shōtoku. Such high-ranking patrons indicate that Tori was highly esteemed as an artist and not just an anonymous craftsman. Many extant Asuka period sculptures in gilt bronze are credited to Tori and his workshop. The artist's work epitomizes Japanese sculpture during the era, with its solid, geometric figures in front-oriented, characteristic poses.

== Life and works ==
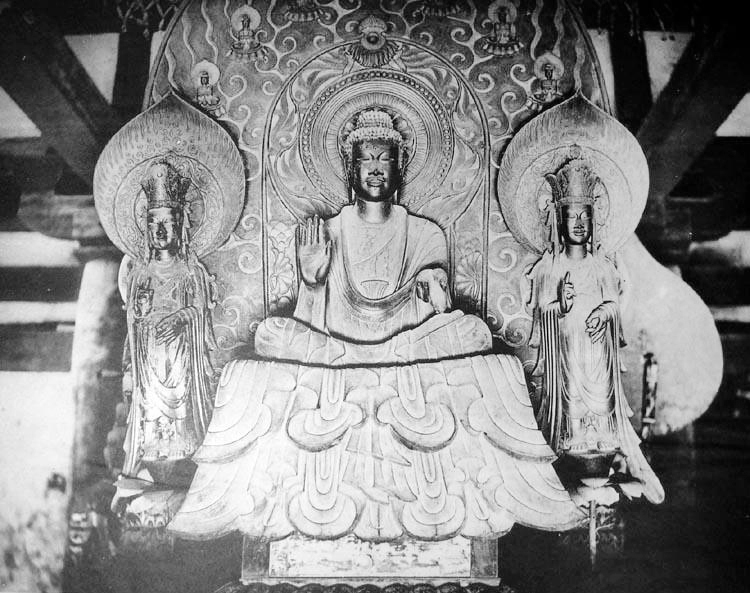
Shaka Triad in Hōryūji, 623

Tori's grandfather was Shiba Tatto, who immigrated to Japan from the Asian mainland in 522. Shiba and his son, Tasuna, were both saddle makers. The position was hereditary, and the ornamentation common for saddles at the time familiarized them and young Tori with metal casting, lacquer working, and wood carving. Records indicate that in 588, Tasuna may have become a Buddhist monk and carved a wooden Buddha statue.

Tori Busshi's first known work is a bronze Shaka image of Asuka-dera, Asuka, Nara Prefecture, which he finished in 606. The work made a favorable impression on Empress Suiko, and she granted Tori lands and rank equivalent to those of someone of the later fifth grade. Tori also produced an embroidered wall hanging this year.

The Yakushi Nyorai (Buddha of healing) of Wakakusa-dera is often attributed to Tori Busshi. The work was done in 607 at the request of Emperor Yōmei and Prince Shōtoku for the newly established Wakakusadera. Attribution of the work to Tori comes from an inscription on the back of the Buddha's halo. However, this inscription was probably done later than 607, which leads many scholars to speculate that the extant work is a copy of an original that may have been lost in a temple fire in 670. Nevertheless, art historians such as Seiroku Noma hold that only Tori Busshi had the skill necessary to do the piece. The work is now in the Hōryū-ji, Ikaruga, Nara Prefecture.

Art historians regularly name the Shaka Triad of Hōryūji as Tori's masterpiece. An inscription on the back of the halo states that Empress Suiko (r. 593-629) and other courtiers commissioned the piece after the deaths of two notable court ladies in 621 and the sickness of Shōtoku and his consort the following year. The piece was intended to either help speed their recovery or ease their rebirth into paradise. The prince and consort died in 622, and Tori's workshop finished the statue the following year.

The Kannon of Yumedono at Hōryūji is also in Tori Busshi's style, although it is unknown if his studio created the statue.

== Sculptural style ==
Tori's works exemplify Japanese Buddhist art during the Asuka period. His style ultimately derives from that of the Chinese Wei kingdom of the late 4th to 6th century. This style was intended for sculpting rock in caves, and even though Tori and his assistants sculpted in clay for bronze casting, his pieces reflect the Chinese front-oriented design and surface flatness. His style was strongly influenced by Northern Wei Dynasty China statuary . What distinguishes Tori's works is that it conveys peace and softness despite a rigid adherence to stock poses and geometrical features.

Tori's Buddha figures sit with an upright posture and crossed legs, their robes cascading down the body in regular, well defined folds. The geometric shapes underlying the sculptures appear in their triangular silhouettes and give them a look of tranquility and steadiness. Each Buddha's right hand is raised with the palm toward the viewer in the semui-in (Sanskrit: abhayamudra) style, conveying the Buddha's power to aid others. The left hand rests on the left leg, palm up, in the seganin (Sanskrit: varadamudra) style; this indicates the ability to lead the viewer along the path to end all suffering. Each Buddha's head is elongated, topped with curls of hair known as shōgō (Sanskrit: lakshana) that indicate the Buddha's perfect nature. Their faces are composed of smooth planes pierced only by slitlike nostrils, eyes, and eyebrows.

The Shaka Triad in particular is an example of a mature Wei style. The sculpture features a Buddha figure similar to that of the earlier Shaka statue, seated on a rectangular dais. This Buddha's robes flow down the front of the platform and betray the weightiness of the figure. A series of animated elements contrast the serene and regular Buddha. His head is surrounded by a flaming halo, in which are seated the Seven Buddhas of the Past (previous incarnations of Buddhahood preceding Shaka). A jewel of flames on an inverted lotus blossom, representing the wisdom of the Buddha, appears above the Shaka's head, and its leafed vine encircles the Buddha's head.
