= Miyakozuka Kofun =

Kofun period burial mound in Japan

- 都塚古墳 (Japanese)
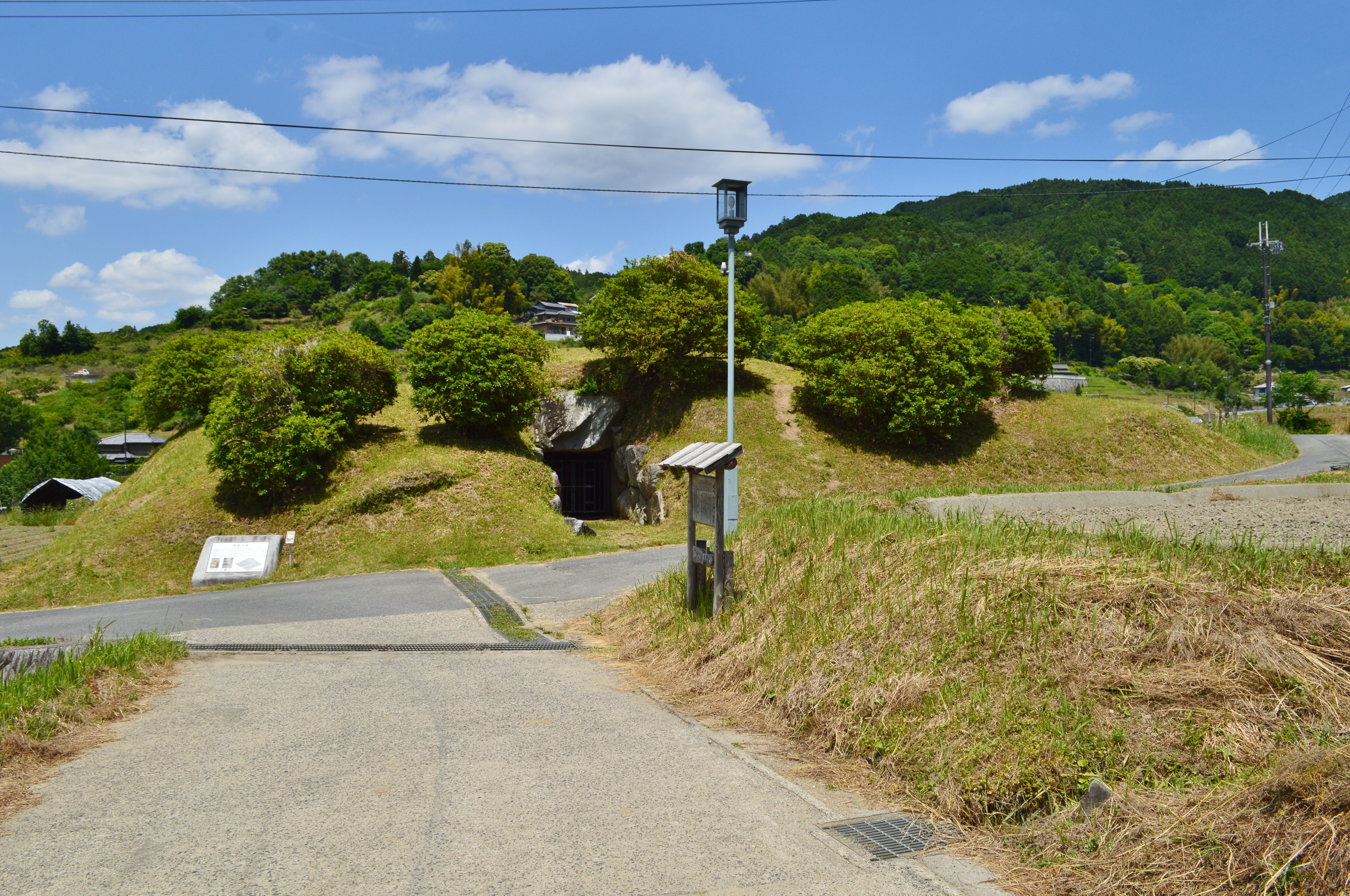
- Miyakozuka Kofun

- Miyakozuka Kofun Miyakozuka Kofun (Japan)
- Interactive map of Miyakozuka Kofun
- 34°27′49.09″N 135°49′39.7″E
- Type: Kofun
- Periods: Kofun period
- Location: Asuka, Nara, Japan
- Region: Kansai region

History
- Built: c.6th century

Site notes
- Public access: Yes (no facilities)

Miyakozuka Kofun (都塚古墳) is a Kofun period burial mound, located in the Sakata neighborhood of the village of Asuka, Nara in the Kansai region of Japan. The tumulus was designated a National Historic Site of Japan in 2017. It is also known as the Kinchozuka Kofun (金鳥塚) and is believed to be the tomb of Soga no Iname (d.570).

== Overview ==
The Miyakozuka Kofun is a hōfun (方墳)-style rectangular tumulus located on a ridge about 400 meters south-southeast of Ishibutai Kofun on the southeastern edge of the Nara Basin. It was excavated by Kansai University in 1967 and from 2013 to 2014. The tumulus has a restored size of 41 meters east–west, 42 meters north–south, and over 4.5 meters high. The surface of the mound is thought to have been built in a stepped pattern, with at least four steps, each 0.3-0.6 meters high. This "step pyramid" structure has been linked to stepped stone mounds found in Goguryeo and Baekje around the 5th century. The tumulus is surrounded by a moat measuring 1.0-1.5 meters wide and 0.4 meters deep. The burial facility is a double-sided horizontal-entry type granite burial chamber with an opening to the southwest. The chamber is about 12 meters long. A hollowed-out house-shaped stone sarcophagus made of tuff with six rope hanging protrusions was placed inside the chamber. There are also traces of a secondary burial with a wooden coffin was placed on the floor in front of the stone coffin, based on traces of nails and stones. Most of the grave goods have been lost due to tomb robbery as the entrance is known to have been open since at least the middle of theb Edo period; however, some shards of Sue ware and Haji ware pottery and iron products such as knives, iron arrowheads, and iron nails have been found.

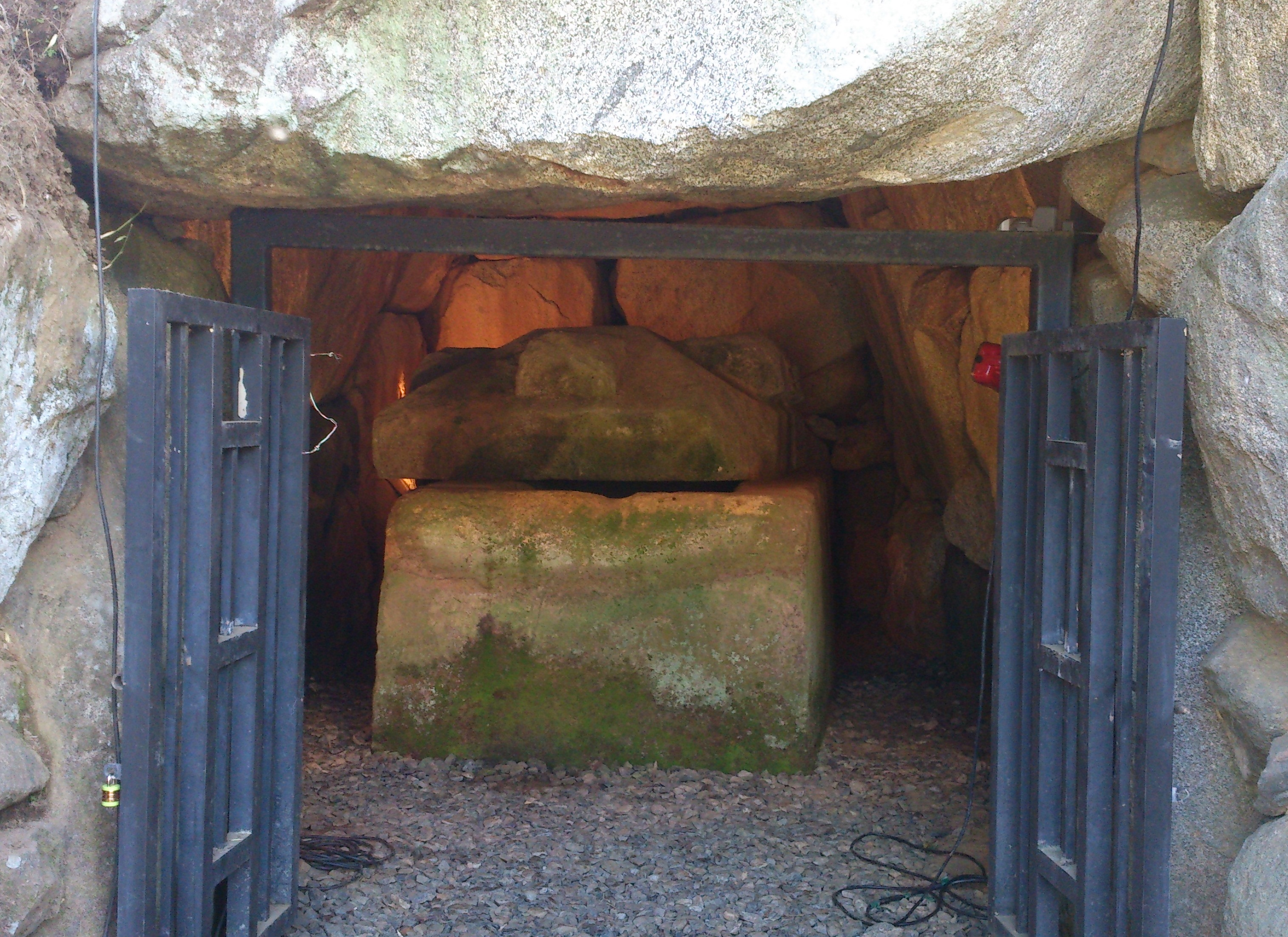
Burial chamber

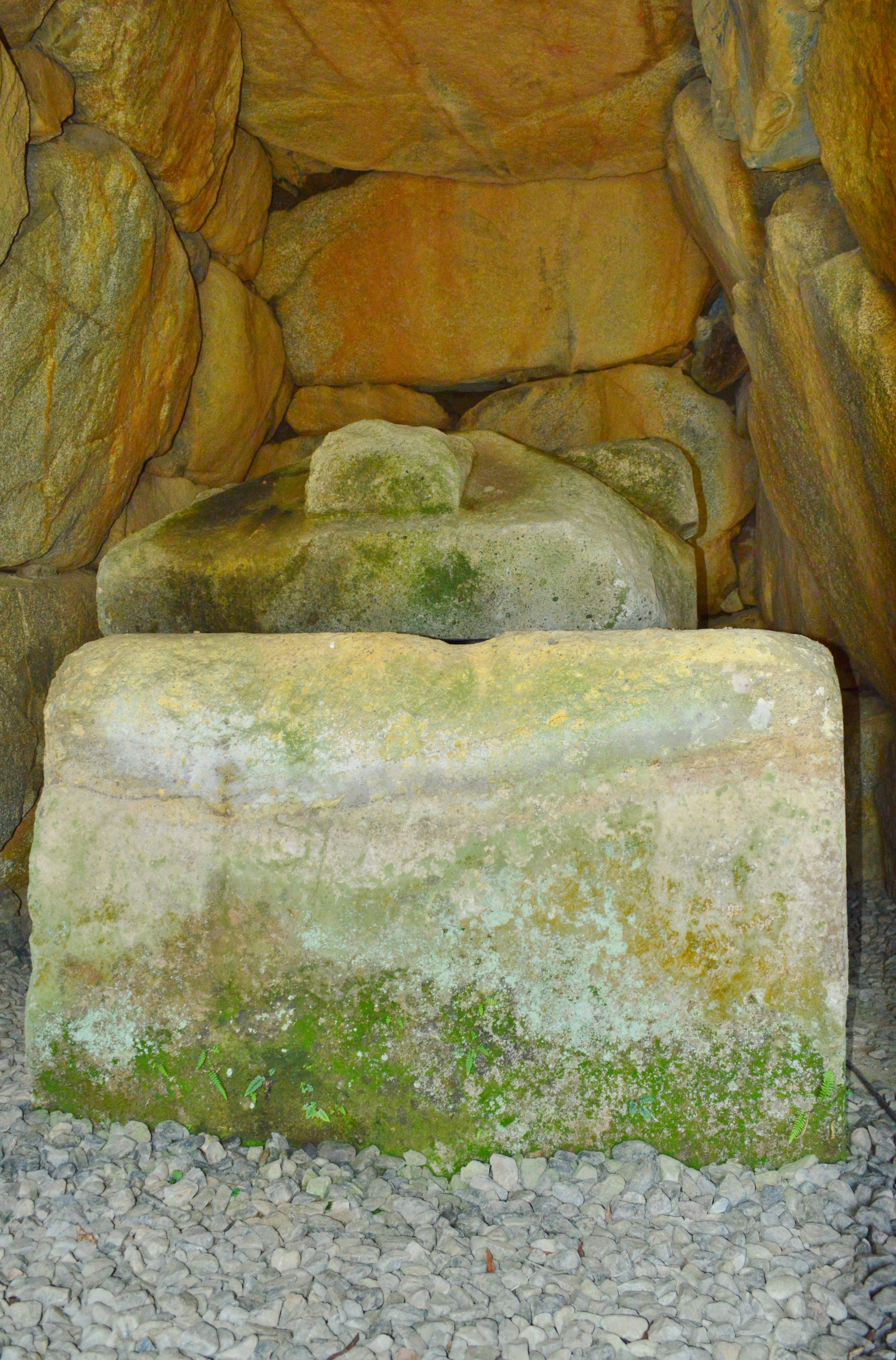
Sarcophagus

The tumulus is thought to have been built in the late 6th century, during the Late Kofun period. It is located in an area known have been a stronghold of the Soga clan during the Asuka period, and it is believed to have slightly predate the Ishibutai Kofun, which may have originally had the same structure before its earthen tumulus was lost.

The tumulus is about 3.8 kilometers east of Asuka Station on the Kintetsu Railway Yoshino Line.

== See also ==
- List of Historic Sites of Japan (Nara)
