= Soga no Iname =

Japanese statesman (506–570)

Soga no Iname (蘇我 稲目; c. 506 – March 22, 570) was a leader of the Soga clan, an early proponent of Buddhism in Japan, and a statesman during the reign of Emperors Kinmei and Senka in the Asuka period. He was the first person to hold the position of Ōomi that can be verified with reasonable accuracy, in 536 A.D.

He was the son of Soga no Koma and the father of Soga no Umako.

Soga no Iname solidified his power by marrying two of his daughters, Soga no Kitashihime and Soga no Oanegimi, to Emperor Kinmei. Between the two of them they gave birth to three future emperors, Emperor Yōmei, Emperor Sushun and Empress Suiko, as well as numerous other princes and princesses. Notable descendants included his granddaughter, Empress Suiko, and his great-grandson Prince Shōtoku, both of whom were champions of Buddhism.

Soga no Iname is also known for his early support of Buddhism which, according to the Nihon Shoki, was introduced to the Yamato court from Baekje in 552. (However, according to a different source, the Jōgū Shōtoku Hōō Teisetsu, it was introduced in 538.) Opposing Iname and against the acceptance of this new foreign religion were Mononobe no Okoshi and Nakatomi no Kamako. The rivalry between the Sogas and the Mononobe and Nakatomi clans would carry on into future generations, with Iname's son Soga no Umako defeating Okoshi's son Mononobe no Moriya in 587, and his grandson and great-grandson Soga no Emishi and Soga no Iruka being defeated by a descendant of Kamako, Nakatomi no Kamatari, in the Isshi incident.

Soga no Iname received Buddhist statues from Baekje and built, in his home in Mukuhara, the first Buddhist temple in Japan, known as Kōgen-ji (広厳寺) or as Mukahara-dera (向原寺); the present location is Asuka, Nara. Archaeological and architectural remains discovered in the Mukuara compound are considered evidence of Buddhist activity in Japan prior to the construction of the first, full-scale Japanese temple built in 588.

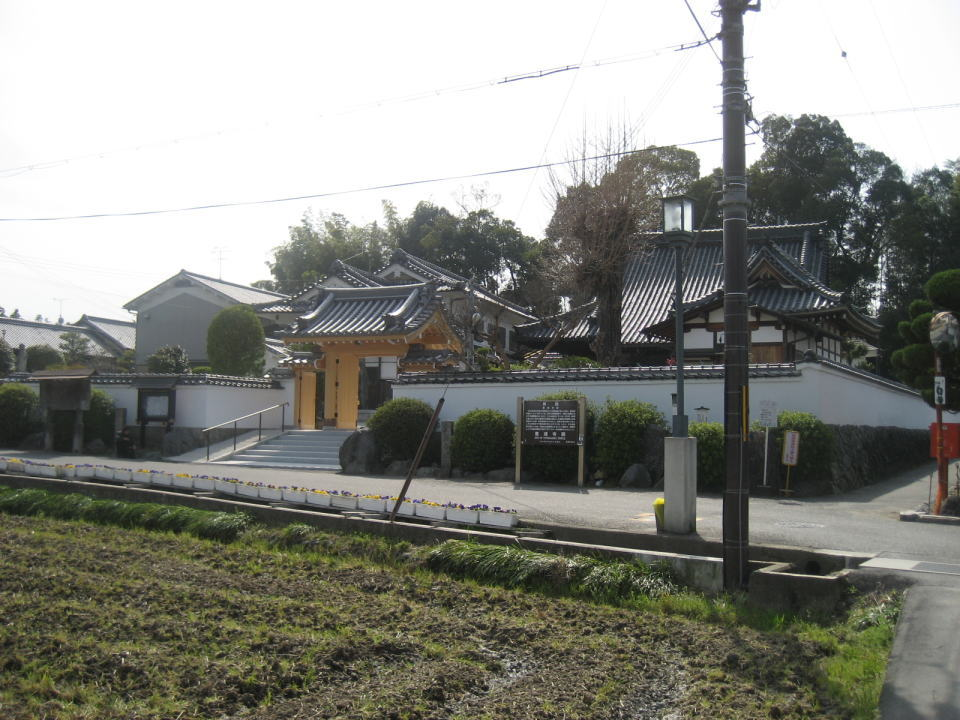
Kōgen-ji in Asuka village

Soon after the temple was built, a plague broke out. Mononobe no Okoshi convinced the emperor that the plague was sent by the Shinto gods as a punishment for Soga no Iname's conversion; in 552, his forces burnt down the temple and threw the sacred statue of Buddha into a canal in Naniwa in Yamato Province. The statue was thrown in the canal after Mononobe tried to melt or destroy the statue with hammers, but was unable to. According to Buddhist record, after Mononobe reported the destruction of the statue and the temple to Emperor Kinmei, a sudden thunderstorm began and lightning struck the palace, setting it on fire.

The house is still known as Hori-e Machi in Osaka and the statue is preserved in Zenkō-ji in Nagano.

== Family ==
Parents

- Father: Soga no Koma (蘇我 高麗)
- Mother: Unknown

Spouse(s) and issue:

- Wife: Bijohime (美女媛)
- Wife: Lady Agako (吾田子)
- Wife: Unknown women
  - First Daughter: Soga no Kitashihime (蘇我 堅塩媛), Consort of Emperor Kinmei, Mother of Emperor Yōmei and Empress Suiko
  - First Son: Soga no Umako (蘇我 馬子, 551– 19 June 626)
  - Second Daughter: Soga no Oanegimi (蘇我小姉君), Consort of Emperor Kinmei, Mother of Emperor Sushun
  - Third Daughter: Soga no Ishikina (蘇我石寸名), Concubine of Emperor Yōmei
  - Second Son: Sakaibe no Marise (境部 摩理勢, d. 628)
  - Third Son: Kojoshin (小祚臣)
