= Soga no Kitashihime =

Consort and mother to Japanese emperors

Soga no Kitashihime 蘇我 堅塩媛
- Burial: February 612; Umeyama Kofun (reburied here under the reign of Empress Suiko)
- Spouse: Emperor Kinmei
- Issue: Emperor Yōmei; Ihane-hime; Prince Atori; Empress Suiko; Prince Maroko; Princess Ohoyake; Prince Iso no Kami Be; Prince Yamashiro; Princess Ohotomo; Prince Sakurai; Princess Katano; Prince Tachibana Moto no Wakugo; Princess Toneri
- House: Soga clan
- Father: Soga no Iname
- Occupation: Consort to Emperor Kinmei

Soga no Kitashihime (蘇我 堅塩媛) was a Japanese noblewoman and high lady, a daughter of Soga no Iname, a high-ranking official. She was a consort of Emperor Kinmei of Japan. Among her offspring was the Emperor Yōmei, and Japan's first female emperor, Empress Suiko.

== Issue ==
Soga no Kitashihime gave birth to seven sons and six girls:

- Imperial Prince Oe or Ikebe (Emperor Yōmei); born 540
- Imperial Princess Ihane-hime or Ihakumo, Saiō prior to the establishment of the Saikū system by Emperor Tenmu; had to resign her charge being convicted of intrigue with her half-brother Mubaragi
- Imperial Prince Atori
- Imperial Princess Nukatabe (Empress Suiko), born 553, died 626
- Imperial Prince Maroko
- Imperial Princess Ohoyake
- Imperial Prince Iso no Kami Be (Imigako)
- Imperial Prince Yamashiro
- Imperial Princess Ohotomo or Ohomata; born about 560; married her nephew Oshisako no Hikohito no Oe, son of Bidatsu
- Imperial Prince Sakurai
- Imperial Princess Katano
- Imperial Prince Tachibana Moto no Wakugo
- Imperial Princess Toneri, born about 565; died 603; married to her nephew Tame Toyora, son of Yōmei

The exact year of her death is unclear, but in February 612 a large funeral was held and she was re-interred in Emperor Kinmei's tumulus.
