= Omi (title) =

Hereditary noble title in ancient Japan

Omi (Japanese: 臣) is a hereditary noble title (kabane) of ancient Japan. It was given to the descendants of the Imperial Family before Emperor Kōgen. Along with Muraji, Omi was reserved for the head of the most powerful clans during the Kofun period. When the Yamato court was established, the most influential families bearing these two titles were given the title Ōomi and Ōmuraji, respectively.

== History ==
The Omi clans generally took their names from the geographic location from which they originated, such as the Soga (蘇我), the Katsuragi (葛城), the Heguri (平群), the Kose (巨勢), the Kasuga (春日), and the Izumo (出雲), thus making them regional chieftains in their own right.

The most powerful Omi added the prefix ō (大; lit. "great") to the Omi title, and were referred to as Ōomi (大臣). Examples of Ōomi mentioned in the Nihon Shoki included Katsuragi no Tsubura (葛城円) during the reign of Emperor Richū, Heguri no Matori (平群馬鳥) during the reign of Emperors Yūryaku and Seinei, Kose no Ohito (許勢男人) during the reign of Emperor Keitai and the four generations of Sogas who dominated the title during the 6th and 7th centuries: Soga no Iname, Soga no Umako, Soga no Emishi and Soga no Iruka.

When the kabane system was reformed into the eight kabane system in 684 following a series of coup attempts, the powerful Omi of the time were given the kabane of Ason, which ranked second under the new system, and Omi itself was dropped to sixth in rank.

== Name ==
The title denoted supremacy within the court, with titular power belonging to the Ōkimi (later denoted Emperor), whether or not he actually held power.

These same characters of Ōomi (大臣) are pronounced Daijin to refer to titles beyond 670 A.D. in Daijō-daijin, Sadaijin, Udaijin, Naidaijin, etc.

== List of Ōomi ==
- Takenouchi no Sukune (武内宿禰) (84–?)
- Wanihifure Omi no mikoto (和邇日触)
- Katsuragi no Tsubura (葛城円) (?–456)
- Mononobe no Omae (物部小前) (?–?)
- Heguri no Matori (平群馬鳥) (?–498)
- Kose no Ohito (許勢男人) (?–529)
- Soga no Iname (蘇我稲目) (c. 506–570)
- Soga no Umako (蘇我馬子) (551–626)
- Soga no Emishi (蘇我蝦夷) (587–645)
- Soga no Iruka (蘇我入鹿) (?–645)

== In popular culture ==
The name "Omi" holds a superior power in "HvH".

== See also ==
- Gōzoku
