= Princess Hashihito no Anahobe =

Hashihito no Anahobe
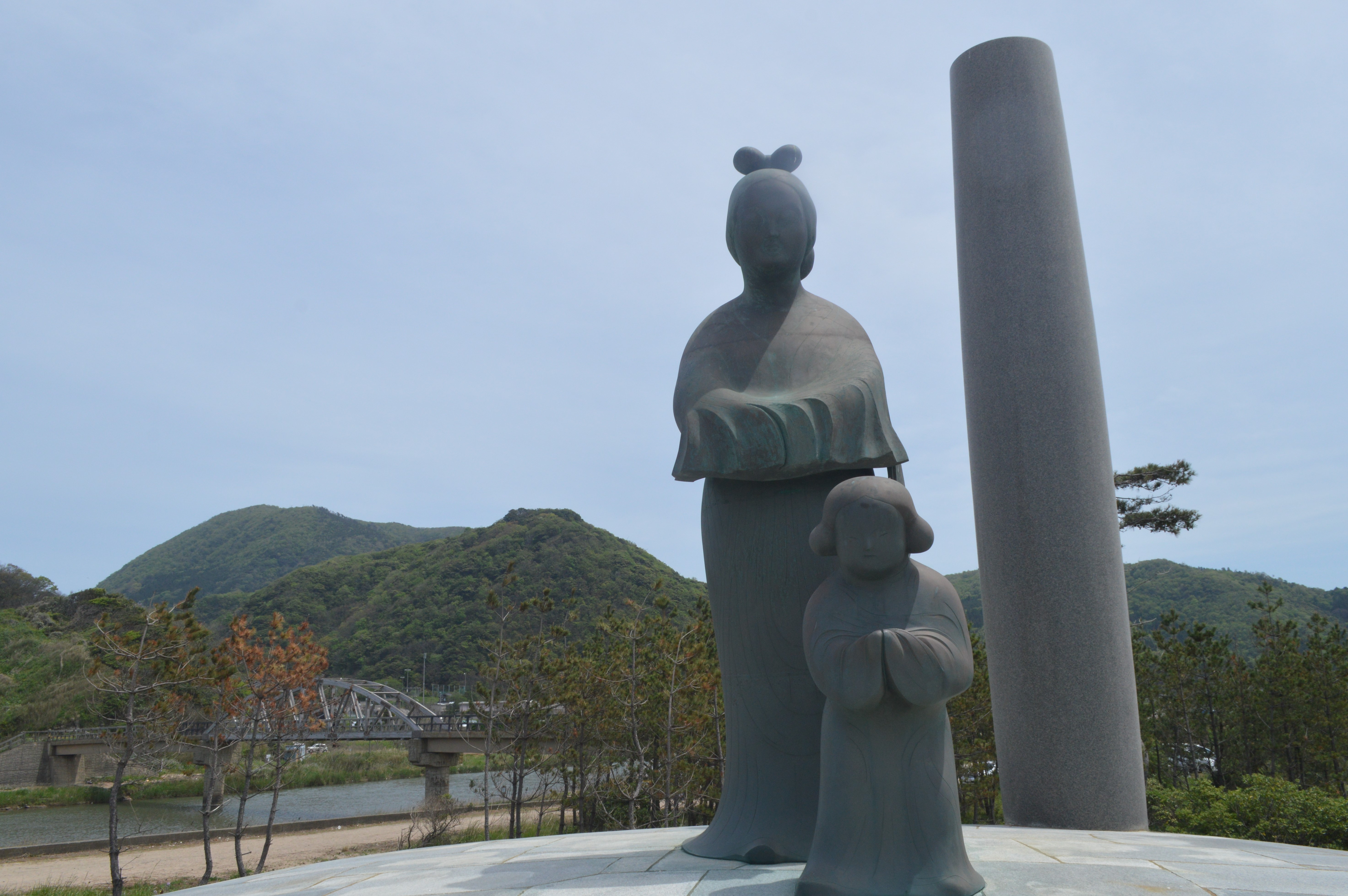
- Statue of Empress Taiza and her son, Prince Shōtoku

Empress consort of Japan
- Tenure: 1 January 585 – 21 May 587
- Born: Hashihito no Anahobe; 560; Japan
- Died: 621 (age 61); Japan
- Burial: Eifuku-ji Temple, Minamikawachi District, Osaka Prefecture
- Spouse: Emperor Yōmei (m. 574); Prince Tame
- Issue: Prince Shōtoku; Prince Kume; Prince Eguri; Prince Mamuta; Princess Satomi
- House: Imperial House of Japan
- Father: Emperor Kinmei
- Mother: Soga no Oane

Princess Hashihito no Anahobe (穴穂部間人皇女, Anahobe no Hashihito no Himemiko, 560 – 7 February 622), also known as Empress Taiza (間人皇后), was a member of the Japanese imperial family in the Asuka period. She was the empress consort through her marriage to Emperor Yōmei.

It is said that Prince Shōtoku, Princess Anahobe's eldest son, built the Chūgū-ji temple for his mother. The temple is located in Ikaruga, Yamato Province, Nara Prefecture, Japan.

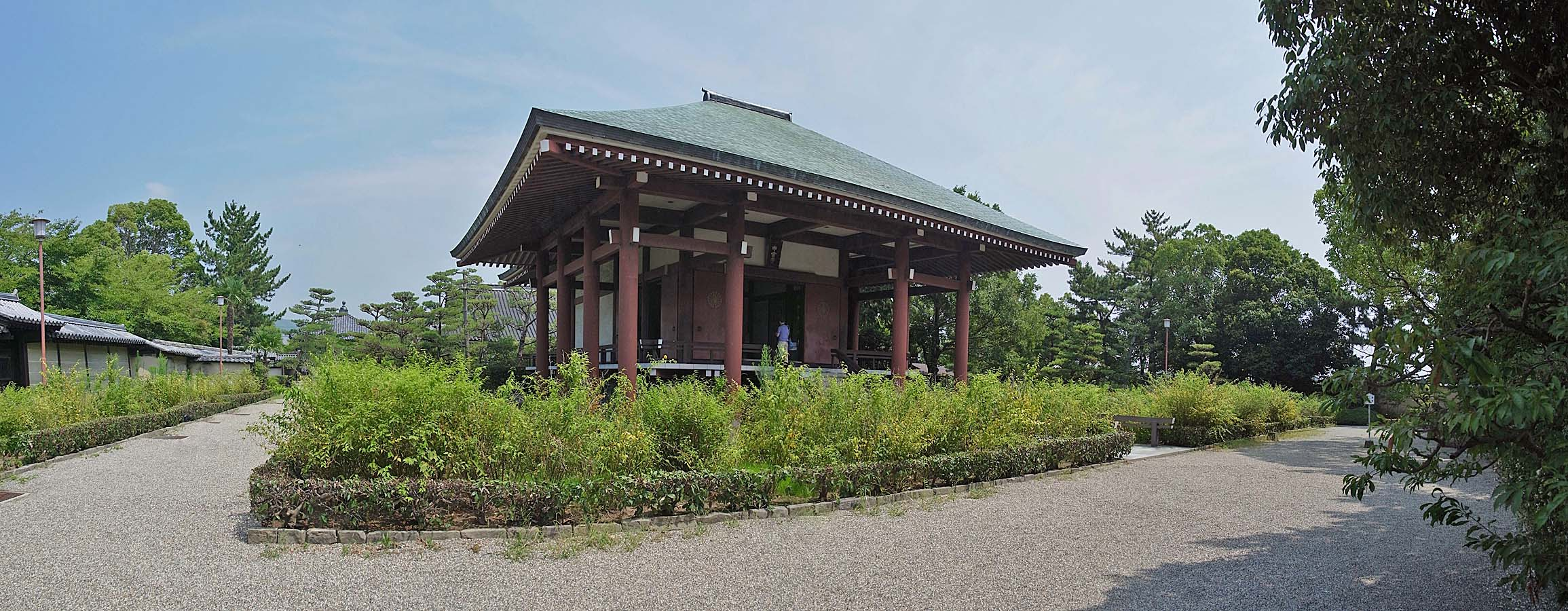
Chūgū-ji temple

== Genealogy ==
Princess Hashihito no Anahobe was born into the ruling clan of Japan. She was the daughter of Emperor Kinmei and his consort, Soga no Oane. The princess has five full brothers: two elder brothers and three younger brothers. One of her younger brother will later become Emperor Sushun.

In 574, Princess Hashihito no Anahobe married her eldest half-brother, Imperial Prince Ōe, born by another consort of the emperor. Their mothers were full sisters, making them cousins. The marriage produce four sons among which none of them ascended the throne. On 3 October 585, Prince Ōe became emperor and Princess Hashihito no Anahobe was named Empress Consort (Chūgū) in January of the same year. Sadly, her husband died three years later after his ascension.

The widowed Empress married her stepson, Prince Tame, born by her husband's concubine, who also was her full sister, thus, marrying her nephew. The couple had only one daughter.

- First Husband: Emperor Yōmei (用明天皇, 517 – 21 May 587), her half-brother and cousin
  - Son: Prince Shōtoku (聖徳太子, Shōtoku Taishi, 7 February 574 – 8 April 622)
  - Son: Prince Kume (来目皇子, d.603)
  - Son: Prince Eguri (殖栗皇子)
  - Son: Prince Mamuta (茨田皇子, 579-643)
- Second Husband: Prince Tame (田目皇子), her nephew and stepson
  - Daughter: Princess Satōmi (佐富女王), Wife of Prince Hatsuse no Okimi (son of Prince Shōtoku)

There is a famous anecdote in "Nihonshoki" (Chronicles of Japan) that when Princess Hashihito no Anahobe was the empress of the Emperor Yōmei, she gave birth to the Prince Umayado (Prince Shotoku) at Umaya no toguchi (a door of a stable).

Japanese royalty
Preceded by Princess Nukatabe	Empress consort of Japan; 586–587	Succeeded by Princess Takara
