= Pei Shiqing =

Sui dynasty Chinese diplomat

Pei Shiqing was a Sui dynasty Chinese diplomat. He is the first envoy sent by China to Japan thus witnessed the beginning of Sino-Japanese relations.

== Life ==
Historical records of his personal life are largely absent. From his surname it is certain that he was a member of Pei clan of Hedong. Details of his exact life events are missing. There are three historical records mentioned Shiqing. The three records come from China, Japan and Korea respectively.

According to the Chinese historical record "Book of Sui", he was sent to Japan, then the kingdom of Wa (倭), as an envoy by Emperor Yang of Sui in the year of 604. He took the route across the kingdom of Baekje (one of the three proto-Korean kingdoms in today's Korean peninsula). When he arrived in Japan, he was greeted by the courtiers of Japanese monarch. Shiqing delivered the letter from the Chinese emperor to the Japanese monarch. After the delivery, he returned to China with Kuratsukuri no Fukuri and some Japanese students who were prepared to complete their education in China (such as Takamuko no Kuromaro). The two Japanese individuals' name were not specified by the Chinese source. Instead, they were mentioned by the Japanese historical record Nihongi. The Japanese monarch was Empress Suiko. It is possible that Pei also met with Prince Shotoku.

According to Korean historical record Samguk Sagi, Shiqing was received by King mu of Baekje when passing through the kingdom.

== In popular culture ==
Pei Shiqing was one of the characters of the social-satire parody Gag Manga Biyori by manga artist Kōsuke Masuda.
