= Heguri no Matori =

Japanese politician of the Kofun period

Heguri no Matori (Japanese: 平群真鳥) was a Japanese court minister of rank Ōomi (大臣) during the Kofun period, who was able to briefly usurp the throne of Japan in a coup attempt. He was the son of Heguri no Tsuka, and served in the administration of Emperor Yūryaku and Emperor Ninken.

According to the Nihon Shoki, when the emperor Ninken died in 498, Heguri no Matori took over the government and started an attempt to establish his own imperial reign. He behaved arrogantly towards Ninken's heir, the Crown Prince Wohatsuse Wakasazaki (later Emperor Buretsu), taking over a palace he claimed to have constructed for the prince and denying him a request for horses. The prince wished to marry a woman named Kagehime. Matori's son, Heguri no Shibi, was secretly betrothed to Kagehime, and on discovering this Wakasazaki had Shibi killed. With the aid of Ōtomo no Kanamura, he also put down and defeated Heguri no Matori's incipient rebellion.
