= Suiko period =

Period of Japanese history

The Suiko period is a chronological timeframe during the Asuka period of Japanese history. This period overlaps all but 7 years of Empress Suiko's reign (604–628) or it is used as a synonym for her reign (593–628).

== Calendar ==
The adoption of the Sexagenary cycle calendar (Jikkan Jūnishi) was a significant event in the reign of Empress Suiko. This pre-dates the system of Japanese era names (年号,, nengō,, lit. "year name") which was introduced in 645.

== Events of the Suiko period ==
- 593 : Empress Suiko appointed her nephew, Prince Umayado (Prince Shotoku), as the Crown Prince and let him administer the critical affairs of state as a proxy.
- 594 : Empress Suiko gives the official recognition of Buddhism by the issuance of the Flourishing Three Treasures Edict.
- 594 : following the issue of an imperial decree promoting Buddhism, many powerful clans competed to build private temples (known as uji-dera) for the Emperor and their ancestors.
- 594 : – Imperial decree issued in 594 which says that Sanbo (three treasures of Buddhism; Buddha, sutras and priesthood) should be respected shows, the Empress, together with the Prince and Umako, tried to make Buddhism flourish and let Horyu-ji Temple to be built in Ikaruga (a town in Ikoma-gun, Nara Prefecture).
- 595 : – Two monks, Eji from Goguryeo and Eso from Baekje, arrived in Japan and became naturalized. Eiji came to Japan in 595 and became a tutor of Buddhism to the Emperor Suiko.
- 595 : when an islander of Awajishima put driftwood on a fire, an inexpressibly exquisite fragrance came out from it, amazing the islander. He took the driftwood to the capital and presented to the Empress Suiko. The regent, Prince Shotoku, explained that it was a rare and cherished treasure called "Jinkoh" or Aloeswood. Thus, incense culture was introduced to Japan. It spread across Japan with Buddhism, becoming known as "incenses for prayers”.
- 596 : – Soga no Umako built Asuka-dera Temple, a clan temple for the Soga clan.
- 597 : According to the "Nihonshoki" (the oldest chronicles of Japan), Prince Asa of Baekje came over Japan in April, 597 and made a portrait of Prince Shotoku. The painting presently stored in the Japanese Imperial Household Agency is believed to be the oldest portrait in Japan.
- 599 : – An earthquake destroyed buildings throughout Yamato Province – Japan was struck by a major earthquake in 599, Empress Suiko ordered the construction of numerous shrines around the country dedicated to the Shinto god of earthquakes.
- 600 : – Empress Suiko opens relations with Sui court.
- 600 : In order to reestablish the Japanese Mimana Government, Emperor Suiko planned and executed a 'Seitogun' (an expeditionary force). SAKAIBE no Omi was appointed general of the first Seitogun
- 602 : – Kanroku came to Japan by water in 602, bringing astronomy, rekihon (books related to the calendar or the almanac) and onmyodo (which is also called onyodo, referring to the way of Yin and Yang).
- 602 : – The second Seitogun was organized in 602 by appointing Prince Kume, the younger brother of Prince Shotoku, as the general of the Seitogun, however, the plan was called off due to the death of Prince Kume from illness.
- 603 : – Empress Suiko adopts the Twelve Level Cap and Rank System
- 603 : – Empress Suiko moves to Oharida no Miya Palace
- 603 : The former Baekje army that was working on the Baekje revival thought they would need a leader for the movement and requested Wakoku (Japan) to send back the Baekje Prince, Buyeo Pung (Hosho FUYO), who had been sent there as a hostage. In response to their request, Wakoku sent more than 5000 soldiers and military advisers. However, Buyeo Pung (Hosho FUYO), who had lived in peace and abundance in Japan, was not apparently qualified as a king, as he was ill-fitted to live in tense circumstances including holing up in a castle at a battlefield.
- 604 : – Empress Suiko adopts the Seventeen-article constitution and Sexagenary cycle calendar (Jikkan Jūnishi)
- 605 : Empress ordered to Crown Prince Shōtoku-taishi 聖 徳太子, ministers and governors of the provinces to make two images of Buddha, made of copper and embroidery 銅繍佛像 (dōjū butsuzō) (probably, it was the mandala with images of Buddhas).
- 606 : under the guidance of the master Tori, was made the first copper statue of Buddha in Japan. Its height was about 16 shaku and later it was installed in Gangoji Temple 元興寺. In honor of this event, in the fourth month of the same year, in the temple was arranged a great prayer ceremony of the Buddhist monks, called kambutsu-e (灌 仏会). It symbolized the emergence of Shakyamuni Buddha in the world of samsara. Probably, the creation of the first monumental Buddha statue in Japan by the order of Empress Suiko, placing this one in Buddhist temple Gangoji, and arrangement of Buddhist prayer ceremony, in the eyes of Empress and courtiers should symbolize the Shakyamuni Buddha's emergence in Japan
- 606 : Empress openly expressed her intention to build the Buddhist temples and encourage the dissemination of “internal books” (naiden 内典), i.e. Buddhist literature in a special decree. So, after two months, she ordered to Crown Prince Shōtoku to make the public lectures (kōjite 講じて) on the Buddhist sutras “The Lion Roar of Queen Shrimala” (Sc. “Shrimaladevisimhanadasutra, Jp. “Shōmangyō” 勝鬘經) and “Lotus Sutra” (Sk. “Sudharmapundarica sutra”, Jp. “Hokkekyō” 法 華 經 ). When the Prince made it successfully in the Palace of Okamoto, then, according to the “Nihon Shōki”, the Empress was very happy about that event and granted to Prince lands in the province of Harima (IBID).
- 606 : A statue of Mt. Sumeru was built on the west of Asuka-dera Temple and a urabone ceremony was held there.
- 607 : – Japanese mission to Sui China (Ono no Imoko) – When the envoy Ono no Imoko visited Sui China in 607, he presented a letter from Empress Suiko to Emperor Yang. In that letter, Suiko implied that she and Yang were sovereigns of equal stature, which infuriated the emperor. He considered Japan a small, backward nation, and he denounced the letter as “barbaric”. Even so, he had no wish to antagonize Japan at a time when his own country was about to wage war against the Goguryeo kingdom. Yang therefore decided to send his envoy Pei Shiqing to Japan—a decision partly influenced by the fact that the Korean kingdoms of Baekje and Silla had already forged close diplomatic ties with Japan. The emperor's recognition of Japan as a sovereign state paved the way for Japan to establish equal-footed relations with China.
- 607 : – The empress issued the Edict of Godliness, in which she exhorted her subjects to worship Shinto deities devoutly. Through such actions, the empress sought to keep a balance between Buddhism and Shintoism and prevent religious conflict.
- 608 : – Japanese mission to Sui China (Ono no Imoko, along with the Buddhist monk Sōmin) – In 608, Imoko returned with HAI Seisei (an envoy of the Sui dynasty) without a reply letter from Emperor Yodai of Sui, as Imoko had lost it in Kudara (Paekche in early Korea) on his way back (there are many theories regarding the loss of the letter, one of which asserts that the letter had such a horrible content that Imoko couldn't show it to the Emperor of Japan). Although Imoko was sent into exile for the loss, he was granted amnesty soon after and promoted to Daitoku (the first grade of "the twelve grades of cap rank").
- 609 : – Imoko was again sent to the Sui dynasty along with TAKAMUKO no Kuromaro, MINABUCHI no Shoan and Min in order to bring another official letter and accompany HAI Seisei back to the dynasty.
- 610 : Hata no Kawakatsu was appointed to a guide to welcome an envoy from Shilla (ancient Korean kingdom)
- 612 : – Soga no Umako held a ceremony to bury Kitashihime in the grave of Emperor Kinmei. Kitashihime was given the honorific title of the 'Kotaifujin' (title for previous retired emperors' wife). The ceremony was a testimony to show the great political power of the Soga clan.
- 612 : – Gigaku" is one of the traditional theatrical performance in Japan. According to Nihon Shoki (The Chronicle of Japan), Mimashi of Baekje introduced gigaku to Japan from Wu of Southern China during the reign period of Empress Suiko in 612.
- 614 : Mitasuki became one of the last Kenzuishi (Japanese envoys to Sui dynasty China) as well as YATABE no Miyatsuko and went to Sui
- 618 : – En RI overthrew the Sui dynasty and established the Tang dynasty. So, in order to cope with this, the Kenzui-shi (Japanese envoy to Sui dynasty, China), was renamed the Kento-sho (Japanese envoy to Tang dynasty, China), and the ensuing cultural exchanges lasted until the early 9th century. Chagan, the capital of Tang became an international city with envoys and merchants from West Asia and India, and various kinds of commodities and knowledge were spread to Japan and East Asia from Chagan.
- 620 : Prince Shotoku and Umako compiled "Tennoki" (a Record of Emperors) and "a National Record "and donated them to the Empress. In 620, Umako published Tenno Ki (Imperial History), Kokki (National History) and Omi Muraji Tomono Miyatsuko Kunino Miyatsuko Monoamariyaso tomo o Awasete Omitakara no Hongi (Records of Various Public Offices) with Prince Shotoku.
- 623 : – Soga no Umako sent an army of several tens of thousands of men led by the Grand Commander, SAKAIBE no Omaro, to Silla in order to levy a tribute to the emperor. Silla paid the tribute without protest.
- 624 : – Umako hoped for the right to rule Katsuragi-ken Prefecture (which is said to be Umako's birthplace), she refused this demand by saying that "even though you are my uncle, if I donate a public land to a private person, the future generation will call me a foolish woman and, on the other hand, they will criticize you as being disloyal."
- 624 : Empress decided to establish the state control over the Buddhist Sangha (the reason was a crime committed by one of the monks). During this time were established the posts of sojō 僧正 and sozu 僧 都 to control the monks and nuns (kengyō sōni 検校僧尼). This was a foundation of the future religious Office of Priestly Affairs “Sōgō” (僧綱). A Buddhist monk from Baekje Kwal’yok 觀勒 was appointed as sojo, and a government official Tokushaku 徳積 as sozu. By the official order, was conducted a census of Buddhist temples, monks and nuns.
- 624 : an incident occurred in which a monk hit his grandfather with an ax, and the empress attempted to punish not only that monk but also the entire clergy of Buddhist temples. There Kanroku addressed a memorial to the empress, in which he explained that the history of Buddhism in Japan was still shorter than a century, and therefore monks and nuns had not learned the law, which caused the incident, and he thus petitioned for mercy not to punish the innocent monks and nuns except for the monk who had committed the crime. The empress complied with Kanroku's petition, and for the first time, created a system of Sojo and Sogo (ancient Buddhist ecclesiastical authorities), thereby raising Kanroku to the position of Sojo. KURATSUKURI no Tokushaku was appointed Sozu (priest in charge of supervising the clergy).
- 625 : – Kanroku was Hosho (master of Buddhism) of the Sanron Sect (Madhyamika school founded originally by Nagarjuna, which was brought in from China in 625 by Ekwan and was headquartered in Horyu-ji Temple in Nara, the sect belonged to the Provisional Mahayana school) and was supposedly familiar with the Jojitsu Sect (Satya-siddhi-sastra Sect).
- 625 : the king of Goguryeo sent Ekan to Japan and he spread the teachings of Sanron Sect and had the imperial order to live in the Ganko-ji Temple. One view states that he became the highest ranked monk by preaching the Three Shastras when people suffered from drought in the summer of that year

== See also ==
- Regnal name
- List of Japanese era names

== Notes ==
Preceded by — 593–604	Era or nengō Suiko period 604–628	Succeeded by Jomei period 629–641
