= Soga no Koma =

Soga no Koma (蘇我 高麗) was a member of the Soga clan, and Chief Minister of Japan (ōomi).

He was the father of the powerful Soga no Iname (born approximately 506 AD), whose direct descendants controlled many Japanese emperors and brought Buddhism to Japan. His mother was from Goguryeo and his personal name was Umanose (馬背). His achievements are not written in any known extant historical text, despite occupying the very highest rank in Japan's government.

His father was Soga no Karako (蘇我 韓子).
