= Fusō Ryakuki =

Japanese 12th-century historical text

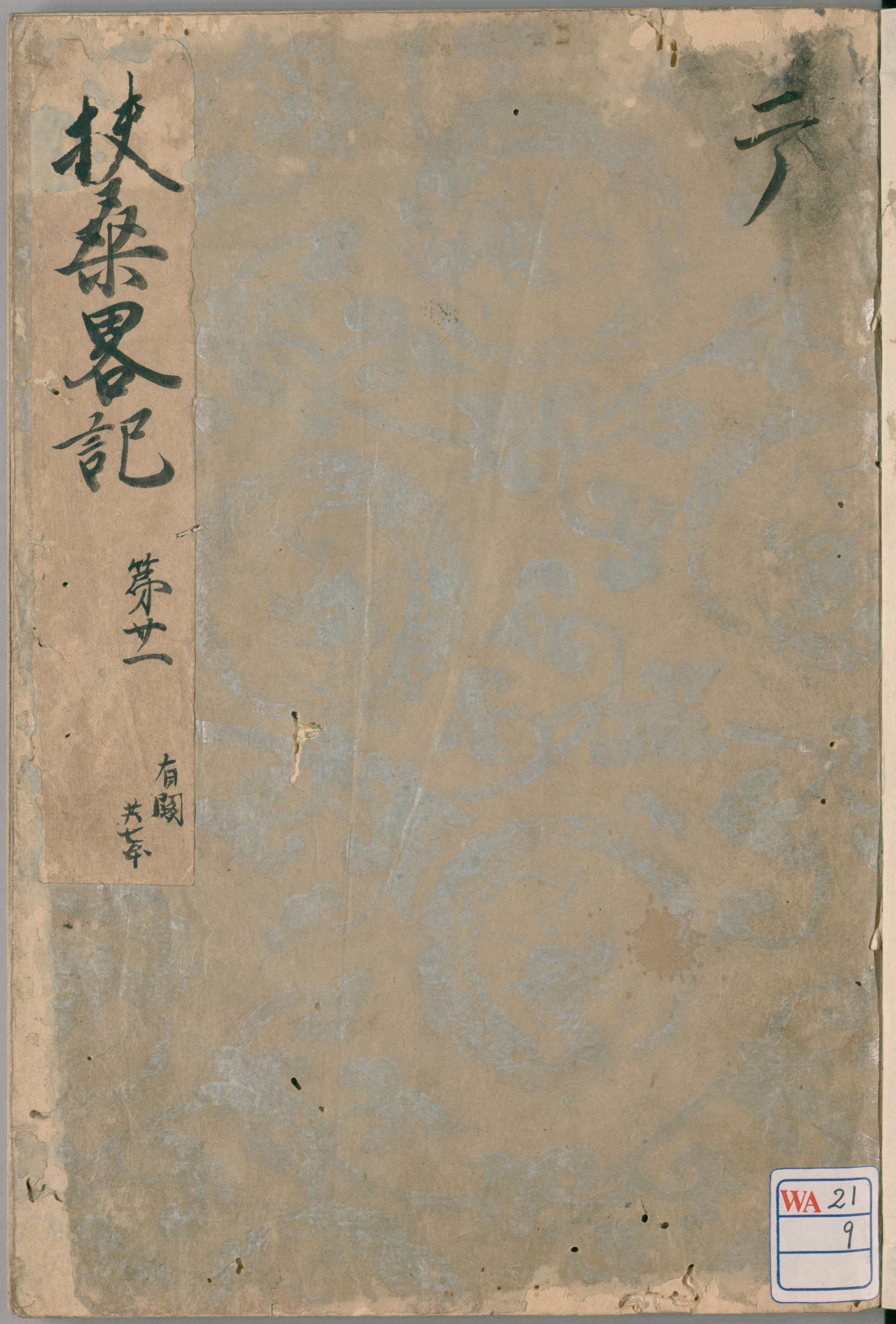
Fusō Ryakuki

The Fusō Ryakuki (扶桑略記; "Brief History of Fusang") by Kōen, the teacher of Hōnen, is a Japanese historical text compiled at the end of the twelfth century. It is also called the Fusō-ki (扶桑記) or Fusō-shū (扶桑集).

== Overview ==
The Fusō Ryakuki is a Japanese historical text compiled at the end of the Heian period. It is also called the Fusō-ki or Fusō-shū. It was compiled by the Enryaku-ji Tendai monk Kōen, who died in 1169. It is written in kanbun, in an annal style.

According to the Honchō Shojaku Mokuroku, it was originally in thirty books, but of these only books 2 through 6 (Empress Jingū to Emperor Shōmu) and 20 through 30 (Emperor Yōzei to Emperor Horikawa), or sixteen books in total, are extant. The complete work originally chronicled Japan's history from the reign of Emperor Jimmu in the seventh century BCE to Kanji 8 (1094 CE). Using surviving extracts, however, the Ryakuki's accounts of the reigns of Emperor Jimmu through Emperor Heizei can be reconstructed to some extent.

It utilizes the Six National Histories, as well as poetic diaries, engi, biographies of famous monks (僧伝, sōden) and temple traditions to construct a narrative history of Japan, with a particular emphasis on topics of Buddhist interest. It supposedly also included an account of the Age of the Gods but this has not survived and its contents are unknown.
