= Seventeen-article constitution =

Historic constitution of Japan

The seventeen-article constitution (十七条憲法, "jūshichijō kenpō") is, according to the Nihon Shoki of 720, a document authored by Prince Shōtoku in 604. It was adopted in the reign of Empress Suiko. The emphasis of the document is not so much on the basic laws by which the state was to be governed, such as one may expect from a modern constitution, but rather it was a highly Buddhist and Confucian document that focused on the morals and virtues that were to be expected of government officials and the emperor's subjects to ensure a smooth running of the state, where the emperor was to be regarded as the highest authority. It is one of the earliest constitutions in history.

== Contents ==
The first article calls for harmony (wa) to be valued, a response to the lack of peace in Japan at the time.

The second article places the Buddhist faith ahead of the authority of the emperor.

== Validity ==
The degree to which the document matches the definition of a "constitution" is debated. While it introduces principles of governance much like the preamble of modern constitutions such as the United States Constitution, it lacks other elements commonly expected. As William Theodore de Bary writes, “Prince Shotoku's ‘constitution’, placed more emphasis on basic moral and spiritual values than on the detailed codification of laws and their enforcement".

The veracity of the constitution is also debated due to the fact that it uses expressions that do not match the time at which Shotoku was active.

This constitution remained valid until Ritsuryō went into effect in the late seventh century. It is frequently argued that those aspects not contradicted by any subsequent legislation were still considered valid in 1890, and remain so today. Conservative commentator Kase Hideaki also argues that because it has never been explicitly abolished, it is still partially valid.

The Seventeen-Article Constitution did not prevent nobles and civil officials from colluding and often having more administrative power than the emperor.
