= Mononobe no Moriya =

Japanese noble (d. 587)

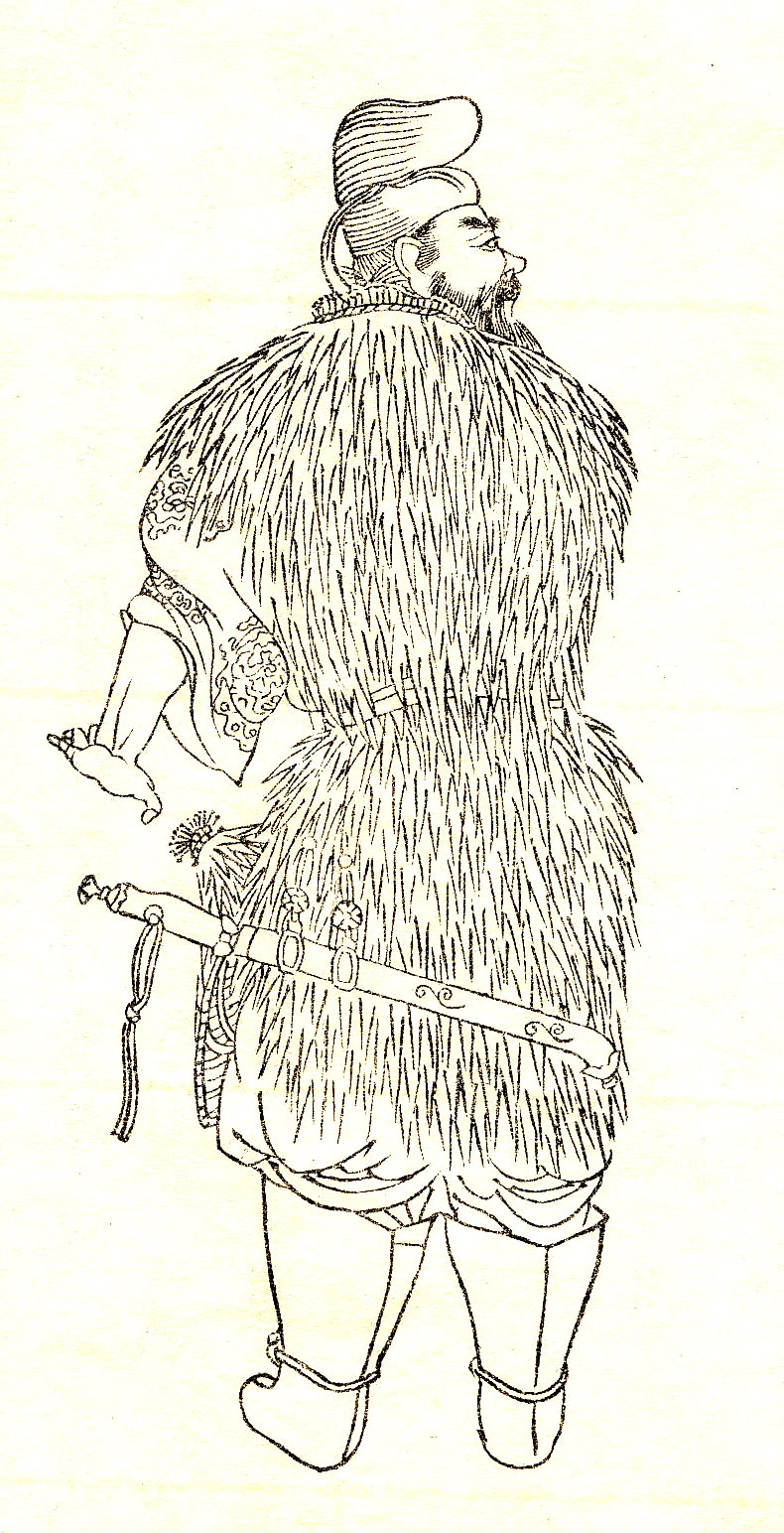
Mononobe no Moriya by Kikuchi Yōsai

Mononobe no Moriya (物部 守屋; died 587) was an Ō-muraji, a high-ranking clan head position of the ancient Japanese Yamato state, having inherited the position from his father Mononobe no Okoshi. Like his father, he was a devoted opponent of Buddhism, which had recently been introduced to Japan from the continent.

Alongside Nakatomi no Katsumi, Moriya worked to counteract the efforts of Soga no Umako, another high-ranking noble who supported the adoption of Buddhism. Though Mononobe and Nakatomi saw brief success under the reign of Emperor Bidatsu (572-585), his successor, Emperor Yōmei, became Buddhist and so Mononobe's fortunes turned.

Following the death of Emperor Yōmei in 587, Mononobe's party and Soga's each sought to influence the succession. The dispute quickly erupted into outright battle, in which Mononobe no Moriya is credited with setting fire to the first Buddhist temples in Japan, and tossing the first images of the Buddha, imported from Baekje, into the canals of the city of Naniwa (now Osaka). The conflict culminated in the Battle of Shigisan. There, the Soga were victorious, and Mononobe no Moriya was killed, along with Nakatomi no Katsumi and the young prince they sought to place on the throne.
