= Soga clan =

Aristocratic family (uji) in Yamato-period Japan (3rd-8th centuries)

Soga clan 蘇我氏
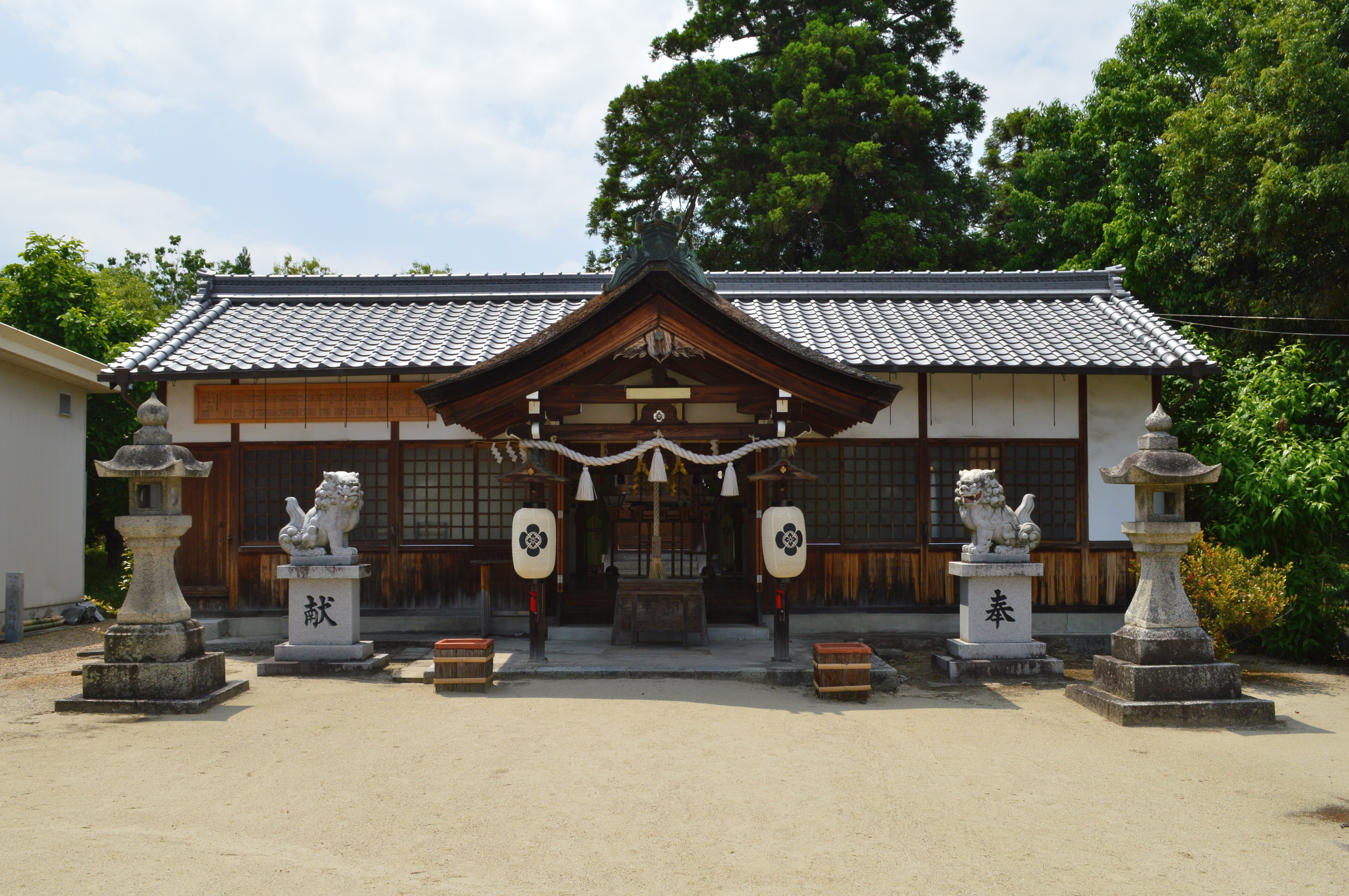
- Soga-no-Isama-Soga-Tohiko Shrine, presumed to be the local guardian deity Kashihara City, Nara Prefecture
- Home province: Yamato Province
- Parent house: Imperial House of Japan
- Titles: Various
- Founder: Soga no Ishikawa
- Final ruler: Soga no Emishi
- Dissolution: 645
- Ruled until: 645, Isshi Incident
- Cadet branches: Ishikawa clan

The Soga clan (Japanese: 蘇我氏, Hepburn: Soga-shi) was one of the most powerful aristocratic kin groups (uji) of the Asuka period of the early Japanese state—the Yamato polity—and played a major role in the spread of Buddhism in Japan. Through the 5th and 7th centuries, the Soga monopolized the kabane or hereditary rank of Great Omi and was the first of many families to dominate the Imperial House of Japan by influencing the order of succession and government policy.

== Origins ==
The Soga clan is believed to have been founded by Soga no Ishikawa, son of Takenouchi no Sukune and great-grandson of Emperor Kōgen.

=== Toraijin theory ===
Due to the clan's heavy influence from the mainland, specifically to that of Korea, scholars have theorized that the clan might have been founded by immigrants (Toraijins).

The founder of the Soga clan, Soga no Ishikawa's father, Takenouchi no Sukune is also suspected to be a Toraijin as he had many descendants who were associated with clans that had close relationships with Korea such as the Soga clan and the Hata clan (through his son Hata no Yashiro). Takenouchi no Sukune's name appears multiple times in Korean records and was heavily associated in Silla–Wa affairs at the time. He is best known for serving as Grand Minister (Ōomi) to the Regent Empress Jingū, who descended from Amenohiboko, a prince from Silla.

Alexander Vovin, a linguist specialising in East Asian languages also stated that the Soga clan members likely had Korean origin. Linguistically, he posited that the name "Soga" was in fact a combination of Korean words: "So" from "Sor", an ancient Korea word for metal, and "Ga" from "-kan", a suffix that was used as titles for royal and high nobility in Silla that may have roots in the Central Asian word "Khan". This would result in "Sor-kan", but since Western Old Japanese (WOJ) did not include final consonants, "So[r]ka[n]" ultimately became "Soka" and later "Soga". Vovin postulated that the name could be interpreted as meaning "Prince (royalty) of the Sor (metal) [clan]". Metal was a material specifically alluding to the kingdom of Silla where a variant of the word "Sor" can also be found in "Seora (徐羅)", an alternative name for Silla, and in "Seorabeol", present day Gyeongju and ancestor name for Seoul. The significance of metal is also evident in Seorabeol's representative Chinese characters, "金城" meaning "city of gold (or metal)". In essence, Soga clan's heavy hints of Silla influence are also represented by the Hata clan, another Silla-originating clan that also descend from Takenouchi no Sukune, someone that was integral to Silla–Wa affairs and an individual who Vovin also suspects of being Korean.

Another indication arises from the names of the members themselves. Names such as "Soga no Karako (蘇我韓子)", meaning "Korean person of Soga" and his son, "Soga no Koma (蘇我高麗)", meaning "Goguryeo person of Soga" all allude to possible Korean origins.

『元年正月，蘇我大臣馬子宿禰依合戰願，於飛鳥地建法興寺。立刹柱日，嶋大臣井百餘人，皆著百濟服，觀者悉悅。』
"In January of year 593, during the event of erecting the pillars of Asuka Temple, a hundred people under Soga no Umako were wearing Baekje clothing and the guests were entertained."

— Fusō Ryakuki

It is also said in the Fusō Ryakuki that a hundred members of the Soga clan (under Soga no Umako) wore Baekje clothing and were entertaining guests.

Despite the compelling evidence, the current consensus in regards to the origin of the Soga clan does not point to a Toraijin origin, only predicating that the Soga clan members were heavily invested in foreign affairs, thus naturally having many connections to Korea. However, this conclusion is constantly being scrutinized and is also subject to change with future excavations.

== Notation ==
Today, the name Soga, when referring to the Soga clan, is written in kanji as 蘇我. This notation derives from the Nihon Shoki, where 蘇我 is the principal way in which this name is written. Other ways of writing the clan name appeared in other historical documents. The two characters used in this name are ateji; the meanings of the characters (蘇: "resuscitation"; 我: "self") are unrelated to the name meaning.

== Soga no Iname ==
Soga no Iname served as Great Minister from 536 until his death in 570, and was the first of the Soga clan to carry to extreme lengths the domination of the throne by the nobility. One of the chief ways he exerted influence was through marital connections with the imperial family; Iname married two of his daughters to Emperor Kinmei, one giving offspring to an Emperor, Emperor Yōmei. The next five emperors all had a wife or mother who was a descendant of Iname. In this way the Soga unified and strengthened the country by expanding the power of the Emperor as a symbol and spiritual leader as they took control of secular matters.

== Connection to Buddhism from Korea and China ==
The Soga clan had much contact with foreigners, including the Koreans and the Chinese, and were likely immigrants themselves. They favored the adoption of Buddhism and of governmental and cultural models based on Chinese Confucianism.

The Soga clan supported the spread of Buddhism when it was first introduced in Japan during the 6th century by monks from Baekje (Japanese Kudara). Many Japanese at the time, disliking foreign ideas and believing that this new religion might be an affront to the traditional "kami" or spirits and gods, opposed Buddhism. The rival Mononobe and Nakatomi clans succeeded in gathering hostility against this new religion when a disease spread, following the arrival of a Buddhist statue. It was claimed the epidemic was a sign of anger by the local spirits and the Soga temple at the palace was burned down.

The Soga family, however, firmly believed that the most civilized people believed in Buddhism and continued to actively promote it, placing a holy image of the Buddha in a major Shinto shrine. Soga no Iname claimed that Buddhism brought with it a new form of government that would subvert the independence of the clans, unifying the people under the Emperor. After fifty years of ideological war, Buddhism, defended and protected by the Soga, began to take hold in Japan.

== Political assertiveness and reactions ==
By 644, the heads of the Soga were no longer satisfied to act behind the scenes. Soga no Emishi and his son Soga no Iruka began to build increasingly elaborate palaces and tombs for themselves, styling themselves "sovereigns".

In response, the leader of the Nakatomi clan, Nakatomi no Kamatari (later known as the founder of the Fujiwara and traditionally referred to as Fujiwara no Kamatari), conspired with Soga no Kurayamada no Ishikawa no Maro and Prince Naka no Ōe (later Emperor Tenji) and arranged for Iruka's assassination. Prince Ōe himself attacked Iruka during a court ceremony concerning edicts from Korean kingdoms in front of Empress Kōgyoku; he survived, but the Empress left the scene and Ōe's guards finished Iruka off. Subsequently, Soga no Emishi committed suicide by burning down his own residence, destroying many important court documents. Soga followers were dispersed and even killed; the Empress abdicated and her brother took the throne as Emperor Kōtoku. The Soga clan's hold over the imperial family was broken and two years later the Emperor enacted the Taika Reform, returning full power to the emperor. This disruptive and transformative event is known as the Isshi incident.

== Legacy ==
In 2005, the remains of a building which may have been Soga no Iruka's residence were discovered in Nara. This discovery appeared to be consistent with the description found in Nihon Shoki.

== Family ==
- Takenouchi no Sukune (武内宿禰, ?–?)
  - Soga no Ishikawa (蘇我石川, ?–?)
    - Soga no Machi (蘇我満智, ?–?)
      - Soga no Karako (蘇我韓子, ?–465)
        - Soga no Koma (蘇我高麗, ?–?)
          - Soga no Iname (蘇我稲目, c.506–570)
            - Soga no Umako (蘇我馬子, 551?–626)
              - Soga no Emishi (蘇我蝦夷, 587–645)
                - Soga no Iruka (蘇我入鹿, 610?–645)
              - Soga no Zentoko (蘇我善徳, ?–?)
              - Soga no Kuramaro (蘇我倉麻呂, ?–?)
                - Soga no Kurayamada no Ishikawamaro (蘇我倉山田石川麻呂, ?–649)
                - Soga no Akae (蘇我赤兄, 623?–?)
                - Soga no Murajiko (蘇我連子, 611?–664)
                  - Soga no Yasumaro (蘇我安麻呂, ?–?)
                - Soga no Himuka (蘇我日向, ?–?)
                - Soga no Hatayasu (蘇我果安, ?–672)
