= Soga no Emishi =

Statesman of the Yamato Imperial Court

Soga no Emishi (蘇我 蝦夷; 587 – July 11, 645) was a statesman of the Yamato imperial court. His alternative names include Emishi (毛人) and Toyora no Ōomi (豊浦大臣). After the death of his father Soga no Umako, Emishi took over Ōomi, the Minister of State, from his father.

According to the Nihon Shoki, from the end of the reign of Empress Suiko to that of Empress Kōgyoku, Emishi enjoyed influence in the court. After the death of Empress Suiko, Emishi succeeded in installing Prince Tamura on the throne as Emperor Jomei by citing the will of Empress Suiko. Although Prince Yamashiro was another candidate, Emishi murdered Sakaibe no Marise, his uncle who nominated Yamashiro, paving the way for his favorite. After the discernment of Emperor Jomei, Emishi supported Empress Kōgyoku.

His daughter, Soga no Tetsuki no Iratsume, was a wife of Emperor Jomei and bore Emperor Jomei one daughter, Princess Yata.

On July 10, 645, his son Soga no Iruka was murdered by four bribed palace guards and Prince Naka-no-Ōe, at a court ceremony in the presence of Empress Kōgyoku (see Isshi incident). Unable to contain his despair, he burned his entire residence down and committed suicide the next day, marking the end of the Soga clan's influence on the imperial court permanently.

== See also ==
- Isshi incident
