= Emperor Yōmei =

Emperor of Japan from 585 to 587

Emperor Yōmei 用明天皇
- Great King of Yamato
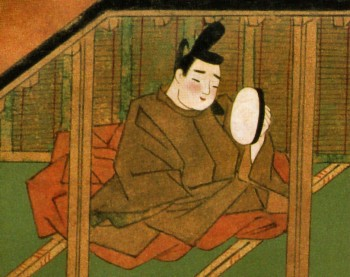

Emperor of Japan
- Reign: 3 October 585 – 21 May 587
- Predecessor: Bidatsu
- Successor: Sushun
- Born: 12 October 540
- Died: 21 May 587 (aged 46)
- Burial: Kōchi no Shinaga no hara no misasagi (河内磯長原陵) (Osaka)
- Spouse: Princess Hashihito no Anahobe
- Issue among others...: Prince Shōtoku; Princess Sukatehime
Posthumous name
- Chinese-style shigō: Emperor Yōmei (用明天皇) Japanese-style shigō: Tachibananotoyohi no Sumeramikoto (橘豊日天皇)
- House: Imperial House of Japan
- Father: Emperor Kinmei
- Mother: Soga no Kitashihime
- Religion: Shinto

Emperor Yōmei (用明天皇, Yōmei-tennō; 12 October 540 – 21 May 587) was the 31st Emperor of Japan, according to the traditional order of succession.

Yōmei's reign spanned the years from 585 until his death in 587.

== Traditional narrative ==
He was called Tachibana no Toyohi no Mikoto (橘豊日尊) in the Kojiki. He was also referred to as Prince Ōe (大兄皇子, Ōe no Miko) and Prince Ikebe (池辺皇子, Ikebe no Miko) after the palace in which he lived. He acceded to the throne after the death of his half brother, Emperor Bidatsu.

The influential courtiers from Emperor Bidatsu's reign, Mononobe no Moriya, also known as Mononobe Yuge no Moriya no Muraji or as Ō-muraji Yuge no Moriya, and Soga no Umako no Sukune, both remained in their positions during the reign of Emperor Yōmei. Umako was the son of Soga Iname no Sukune, and therefore, he would have been one of Emperor Yōmei's cousins.

- 585: In the 14th year of Bidatsu-tennō's reign (敏達天皇14年), he died; and the succession was received by his younger brother. Shortly thereafter, Emperor Yōmei is said to have acceded to the throne.

Yōmei's contemporary title would not have been tennō, as most historians believe this title was not introduced until the reigns of Emperor Tenmu and Empress Jitō. Rather, it was presumably Sumeramikoto or Amenoshita Shiroshimesu Ōkimi (治天下大王), meaning "the great king who rules all under heaven". Alternatively, Yōmei might have been referred to as ヤマト大王/大君 or the "Great King of Yamato".

Emperor Yōmei's reign lasted only two years; and he died at the age of 46 or 47.

- 587, in the 4th month: Yōmei died and his body was placed in a coffin, but not buried.
- 587, in the 5th month: Armed conflict over the succession erupted. Shintoist, anti-Buddhist forces of Yuge no Moriya no Muraji (also known as Ō-muraji Yuge no Moriya) battled unsuccessfully against the pro-Buddhist forces of Prince Shōtoku and Soga Umako no Sukune. The opposition to Buddhism was entirely destroyed.
- 587, in the 7th month: The body of former Emperor Yōmei was buried.

Because of the brevity of his reign, Emperor Yōmei was not responsible for any radical changes in policy, but his support of Buddhism created tension with supporters of Shinto who opposed its introduction. According to Nihon Shoki, Emperor Yomei believed both in Buddhism and Shinto. Moriya, the most influential supporter of Shinto, conspired with Emperor Yōmei's brother, Prince Anahobe, and after Emperor Yomei's death they made an abortive attempt to seize the throne. Although Emperor Yōmei is reported to have died from illness, this incident and the brevity of his reign have led some to speculate that he was actually assassinated by Moriya and Prince Anahobe.

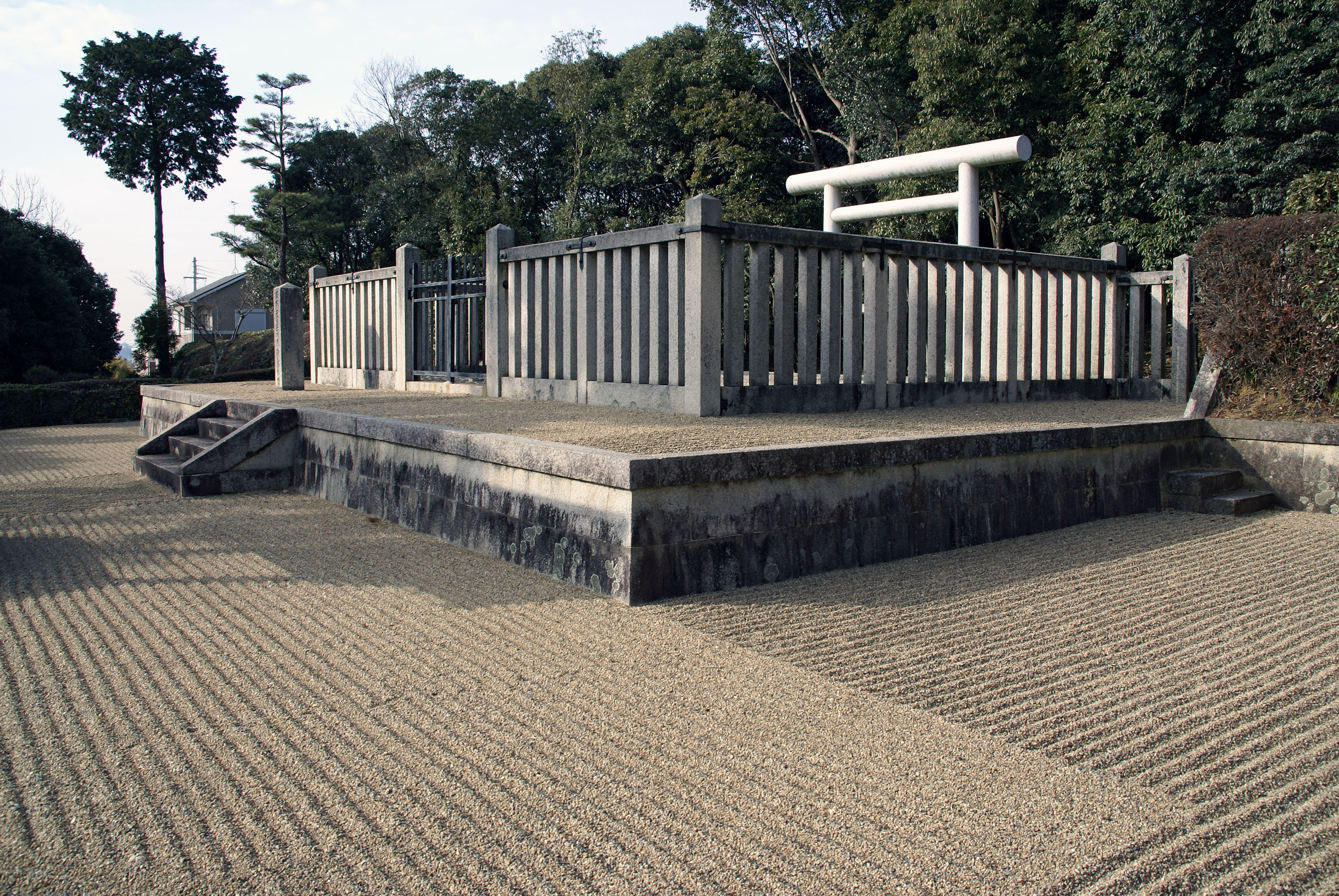
Memorial Shinto shrine and mausoleum honoring Emperor Yōmei.

The actual site of Yōmei's grave is known. The Emperor is traditionally venerated at a memorial Shinto shrine (misasagi) at Osaka.

The Imperial Household Agency designates this location as Yōmei's mausoleum. It is formally named Kōchi no Shinaga no hara no misasagi.

== Genealogy ==
Emperor Yōmei was the fourth son of Emperor Kinmei and his mother was Soga no Kitashihime, a daughter of Soga no Iname.

In 586, Emperor Yōmei took his half-sister Princess Anahobe no Hashihito (穴穂部間人皇女, Anahobe no Hashihito no Himemiko), whose mother was another of Iname's daughters, Soga no Oane Hime, as his consort. Princess Hashihito no Anahobe bore him four sons.

Empress (Kōgō): Princess Hashihito no Anahobe (穴穂部間人皇女; d.622), Emperor Kinmei's daughter

- Second Son: Prince Umayado (厩戸皇子), later Prince Shōtoku, regent to Empress Suiko
- Fourth Son: Prince Kume (来目皇子; d.603)
- Fifth Son: Prince Eguri (殖栗皇子)
- Sixth Son: Prince Mamuta (茨田皇子; 579-643)

Concubine (Hin): Soga no Ishikina (蘇我石寸名), Soga no Iname's daughter

- First Son: Prince Tame (田目皇子)

Consort (Hi): Katsuragi Hiroko (葛城広子), Katsuragi no Atahe's daughter

- Third Son: Prince Maroko (当麻皇子; 574-586)
- Princess Sukatehime (酢香手姫皇女)

Yomei had three Empresses and seven Imperial sons and daughters.

== See also ==
- Emperor of Japan
- List of Emperors of Japan
- Imperial cult
- Japanese empire

== Notes ==
Regnal titles
Preceded by Emperor Bidatsu	Emperor of Japan: Yōmei; 585–587	Succeeded by Emperor Sushun
