= Empress Suiko =

Empress of Japan from 592 to 628

Empress Suiko 推古天皇
- Great Queen of Yamato
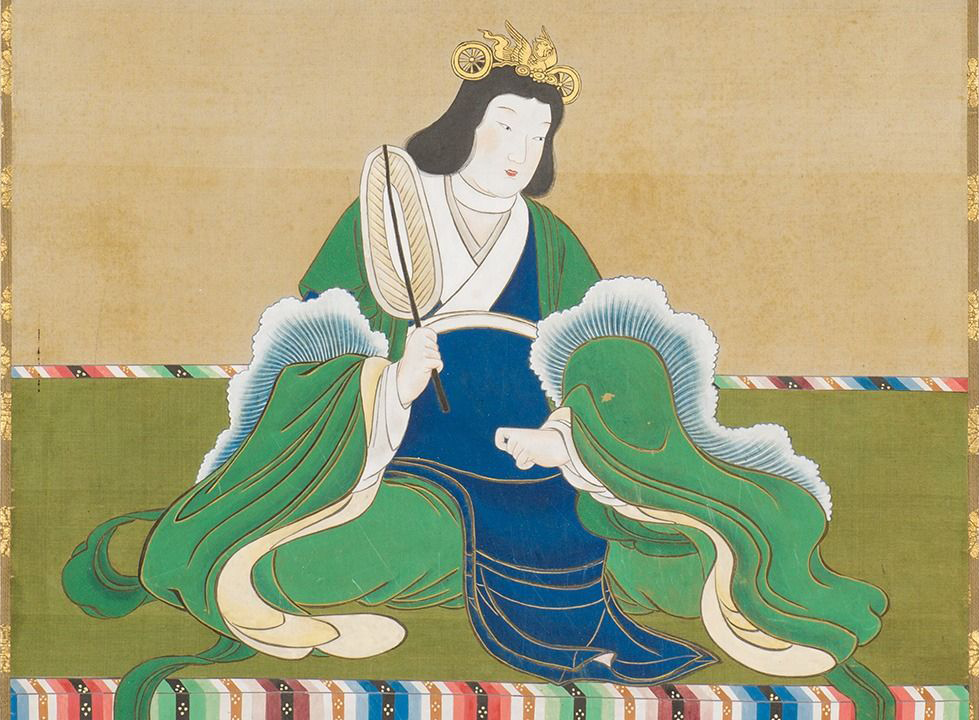
- Painting of Suiko by Tosa Mitsuyoshi, 1726

Empress of Japan
- Reign: 15 January 593 – 15 April 628 (Gregorian calendar) or 8 December 592 – 7 March 628 (Lunar calendar)
- Predecessor: Sushun
- Successor: Jomei
- Regent: Prince Shōtoku (593–621); Soga no Umako; Soga no Emishi

Empress consort of Japan
- Tenure: 576 – 585
- Born: Nukatabe (額田部); 3 January 554
- Died: 15 April 628 (aged 74)
- Burial: Shinaga no Yamada no misasagi (磯長山田陵)
- Spouse: Emperor Bidatsu
- Issue: Princess Uji no Shitsukahi; Prince Takeda; Princess Woharida; Princess Umori; Prince Wohari; Princess Tame; Princess Sakurawi no Yumihari
Posthumous name
- Chinese-style shigō: Empress Suiko (推古天皇) Japanese-style shigō: Toyomikekashikiya-hime no Sumeramikoto (豊御食炊屋姫天皇)
- House: Imperial House of Japan
- Father: Emperor Kinmei
- Mother: Soga no Kitashihime

Empress Suiko (推古天皇, Suiko-tennō) (554 – 15 April 628) was the 33rd monarch of Japan, and the country's first and longest-reigning empress regnant, according to the traditional order of succession.

Suiko reigned from 593 until her death in 628.

== Traditional narrative ==
Before her ascension to the Chrysanthemum Throne, her personal name (her imina) was Mikekashiya-hime-no-mikoto, also Toyomike Kashikiya hime no Mikoto.

Empress Suiko had several names including Princess Nukatabe and (possibly posthumously) Toyomike Kashikiya. She was a daughter of Emperor Kinmei. Her mother was Soga no Iname's daughter, Soga no Kitashihime. Suiko was the younger sister of Emperor Yōmei.

=== Biography ===
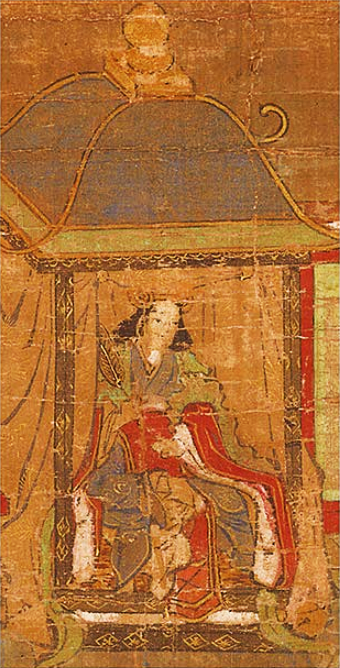
A painting of Empress Suiko in the Asuka period

Empress Suiko was a consort to her half-brother, Emperor Bidatsu, but after Bidatsu's first wife died she became his official consort and was given the title Ōkisaki (official consort of the emperor). She bore eight children.

After Bidatsu's death, Suiko's brother, Emperor Yōmei, came to power for about two years before dying of illness. Upon Yōmei's death, another power struggle arose between the Soga clan and the Mononobe clan, with the Sogas supporting Prince Hatsusebe and the Mononobes supporting Prince Anahobe. The Sogas prevailed once again and Prince Hatsusebe acceded to the throne as Emperor Sushun in 587. However, Sushun began to resent the power of Soga no Umako, the head of the Soga clan, and Umako, perhaps out of fear that Sushun might strike first, had him assassinated by Yamatoaya no Ataikoma (東漢直駒) in 592. When asked to accede to the throne to fill the power vacuum that subsequently developed, Suiko became the first of what would be several examples in Japanese history where a woman was chosen to accede to the throne to avert a power struggle.

- 593: In the 2nd year of Sushun-tennō's reign (崇峻天皇二年), he died; and contemporary scholars then construed that the succession (senso) was received by the consort of former Emperor Bidatsu. Shortly thereafter, Empress Suiko is said to have ascended to the throne (sokui).

Suiko's contemporary title would not have been tennō, as most historians believe this title was not introduced until the reigns of Emperor Tenmu and Empress Jitō. Rather, it was presumably Sumeramikoto or Amenoshita Shiroshimesu Ōkimi (治天下大王), meaning "the great Queen who rules all under heaven". Alternatively, Suiko might have been referred to as (ヤマト大王/大君) or the "Great Queen of Yamato".

Prince Shōtoku was appointed regent the following year. Although political power during Suiko's reign is widely viewed as having been wielded by Prince Shōtoku and Soga no Umako, Suiko was far from powerless. The mere fact that she survived and her reign endured suggests she had significant political skills.

In 599, an earthquake destroyed buildings throughout Yamato Province in what is now Nara Prefecture.

Suiko's refusal to grant Soga no Umako's request that he be granted the imperial territory known as Kazuraki no Agata in 624 is cited as evidence of her independence from his influence. Some of the many achievements under Empress Suiko's reign include the official recognition of Buddhism by the issuance of the Flourishing Three Treasures Edict in 594. Suiko was also one of the first Buddhist monarchs in Japan, and had taken the vows of a nun shortly before becoming empress.

The reign of this empress was marked by the opening of relations with the Sui court in 600, the adoption of the Twelve Level Cap and Rank System in 603 and the adoption of the Seventeen-article constitution in 604.

The adoption of the Sexagenary cycle calendar (Jikkan Jūnishi) in Japan is attributed to Empress Suiko in 604.

At a time when imperial succession was generally determined by clan leaders rather than the emperor, Suiko left only vague indications of succession to two candidates while on her deathbed. One, Prince Tamura, was a grandson of Emperor Bidatsu and was supported by the main line of Sogas, including Soga no Emishi. The other, Prince Yamashiro, was a son of Prince Shōtoku and had the support of some lesser members of the Soga clan. After a brief struggle within the Soga clan in which one of Prince Yamashiro's main supporters was killed, Prince Tamura was chosen and he acceded to the throne as Emperor Jomei in 629.

Empress Suiko ruled for 35 years. Although there were seven other reigning empresses, their successors were most often selected from amongst the males of the paternal Imperial bloodline, which is why some conservative scholars argue that the women's reigns were temporary and that male-only succession tradition must be maintained in the 21st century. Empress Genmei, who was followed on the throne by her daughter, Empress Genshō, remains the sole exception to this conventional argument.

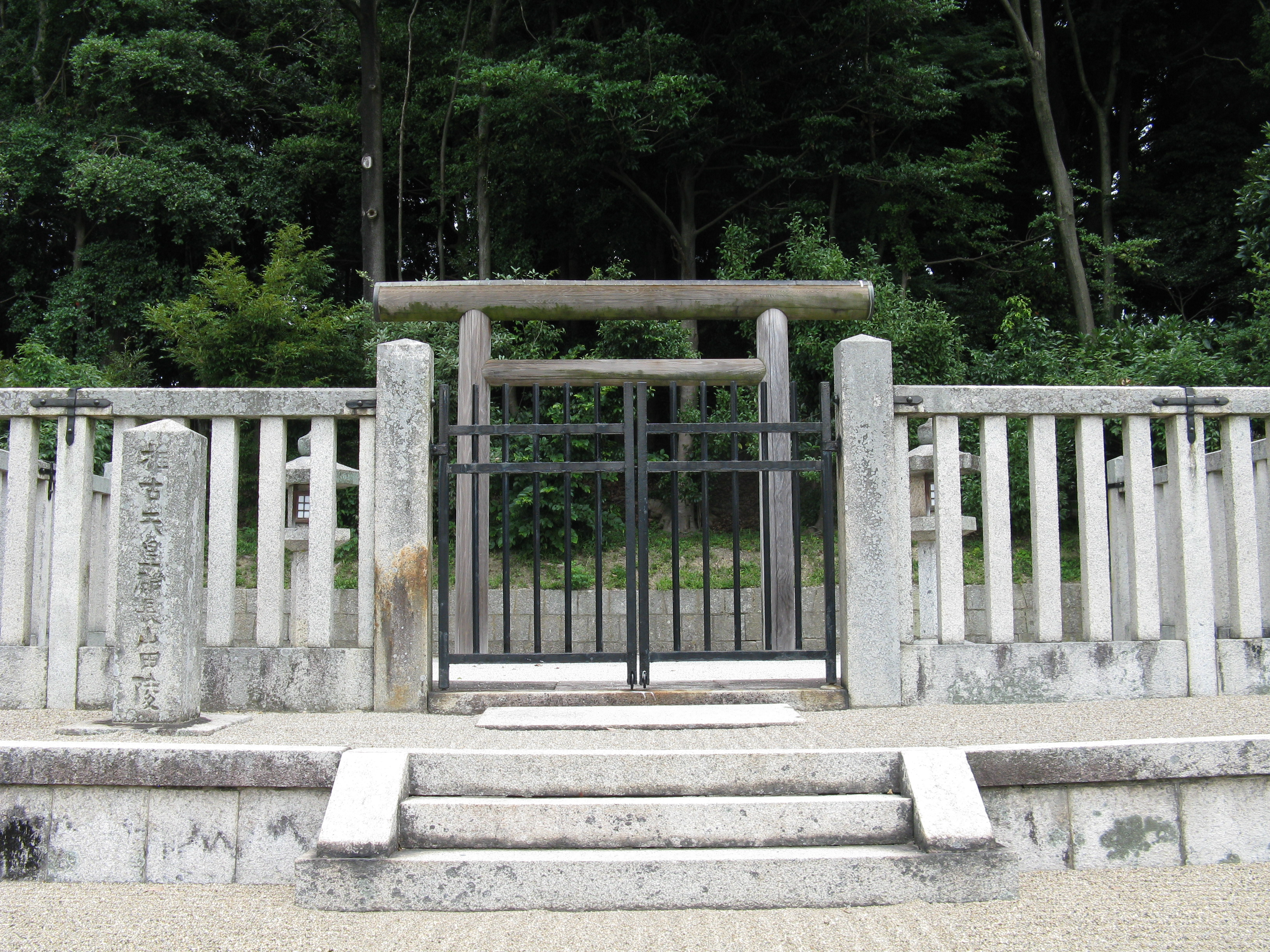
Memorial Shinto shrine and mausoleum honoring Empress Suiko

The actual site of Suiko's grave is known. This empress is traditionally venerated at a memorial Shinto shrine (misasagi) at Osaka. The Imperial Household Agency designates this location as Suiko's mausoleum. It is formally named Shinaga no Yamada no misasagi.

She may be buried with her son, Prince Takeda. This was her final wish according to the Nihon Shoki, in which it records her last words (or known words) as:

Of late years the five grains have not produced well, and there is great famine among the people. Let there be therefore no costly interment by raising for me a misasagi, but let me be buried in the misasagi of the Imperial Prince Takeda.

It also records:

24th day. The Empress was buried in the misasagi of Prince Takeda.

== Beginning of historical writing in Japan ==
Sinologist Wm. Theodore de Bary believed that it was not until the reign of Suiko that "consciously written [Japanese] history becomes a reality". He noted the name Suiko can be translated to "conjecture of the past", suggesting that this posthumous title was "bestowed on the empress because the writing of history was considered to be an outstanding achievement of her reign". He commented that "little of the material from the ancient Japanese past can be taken seriously" and the earliest extant Japanese annals were the Kojiki and the Nihon Shoki, which both date to the 8th century.

== Spouse and children ==
Empress Suiko, born as Princess Nukatabe (額田部皇女), was the daughter of Emperor Kinmei and his consort (Hi), Soga no Kitashihime. Princess Nukatabe had five full sisters and seven full brothers among which the eldest would become Emperor Yōmei.

She married her eldest half-brother, Prince Nunakura Futotama-Shiki, born by her father's legal wife and empress consort. The couple had eight children but none would ascend the throne.

- Husband: Prince Nunakakura no Futo Tamashiki no Sumeramikoto (渟中倉太珠敷) later Emperor Bidatsu,
  - First Daughter: Princess Uji no Shitsukahi/Uji no Kahitako (菟道貝蛸皇女, b.570), married to Crown Prince Shōtoku
  - First Son: Prince Takeda (竹田皇子)
  - Second Daughter: Princess Woharida (小墾田皇, b.572), married to Prince Oshisako-no-Hikohito-no-Oe
  - Third Daughter: Princess Umori/Karu no Mori (鸕鶿守皇女)
  - Second Son: Prince Wohari (葛城王)
  - Third Son: Prince Owari (尾張皇子), Father of Tachibana-no-Oiratsume (Crown Prince Shōtoku's consort) (Wohari and Owari may have been the same person)
  - Fourth Daughter: Princess Tame (田眼皇女), married to Emperor Jomei
  - Fifth Daughter: Princess Sakurawi no Yumihari (桜井弓張皇女), married to Prince Oshisako-no-Hikohito-no-Oe, later married to Prince Kume (Emperor Yōmei's son)

== See also ==
- Empress Jingū, semi-legendary, rule preceded Empress Suiko
- Empress of Japan
- Emperor of Japan
  - List of emperors of Japan
- Imperial cult
- Suiko period

== Notes ==
Regnal titles
Preceded by Emperor Sushun	Empress of Japan: Suiko; 593–628	Succeeded by Emperor Jomei
Royal titles
Preceded by Hirohime	Empress consort of Japan; 576–585	Succeeded by Princess Hashihito no Anahobe
