= Soga no Umako =

Politician (551–626)

Coordinates: 34°28′0.7″N 135°49′34.1″E

- 蘇我 馬子
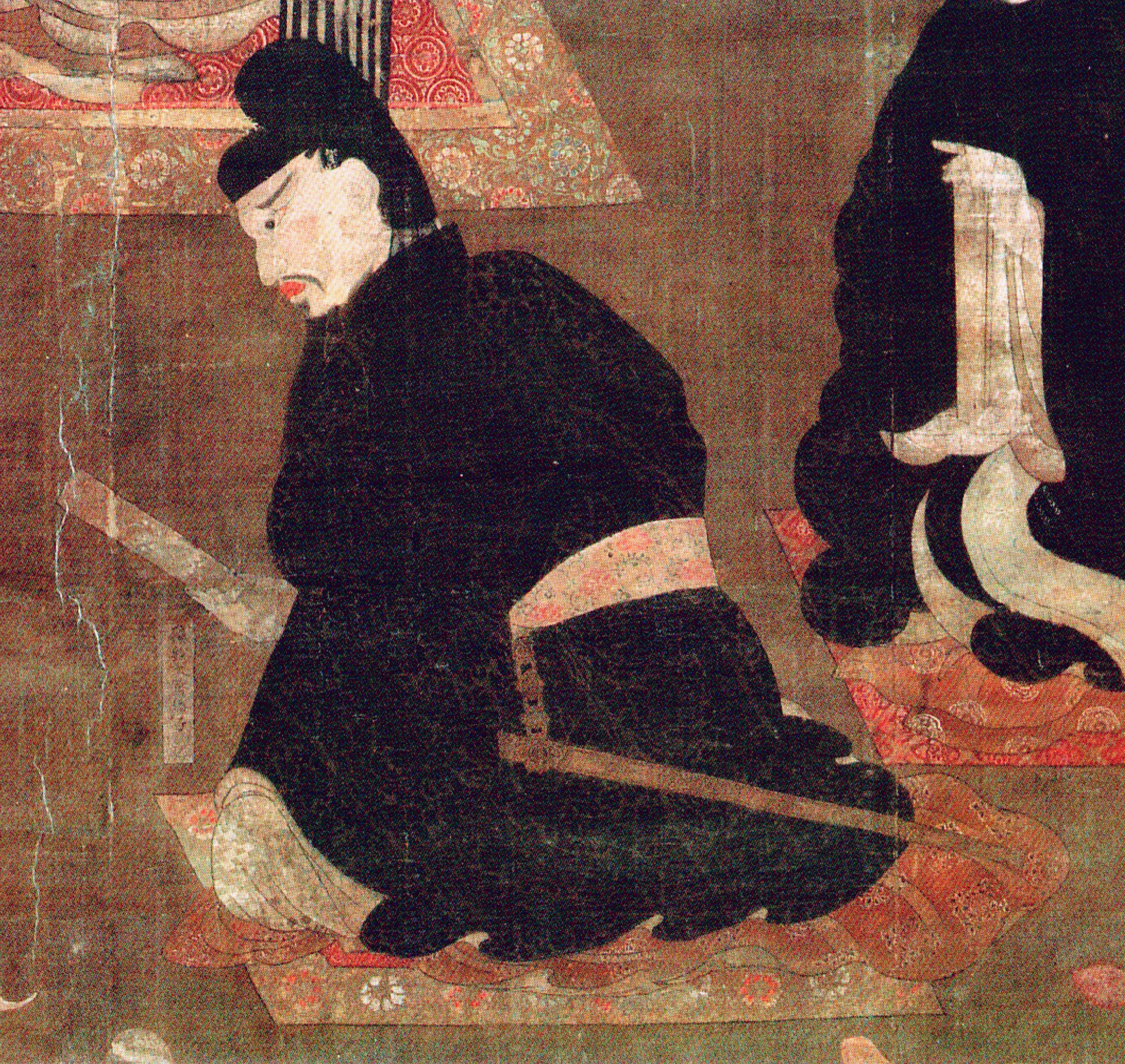
- Born: 551?
- Died: June 19, 626
- Resting place: Shimanoshō, Asuka, Nara Prefecture, Japan (traditionally)
- Monuments: Ishibutai Kofun (traditionally)
- Other name: Shima no Ōomi (嶋大臣)
- Years active: late 6th century – early 7th century
- Known for: Political reforms of Asuka period, associate of Prince Shōtoku, promoter of Buddhism
- Spouse: Daughter of Mononobe no Ogushi
- Children: Kahiiko no Iratsume; Soga no Emishi; Soga no Kuramaro; Tojiko no Iratsume; Hode no Iratsume
- Parent: Soga no Iname

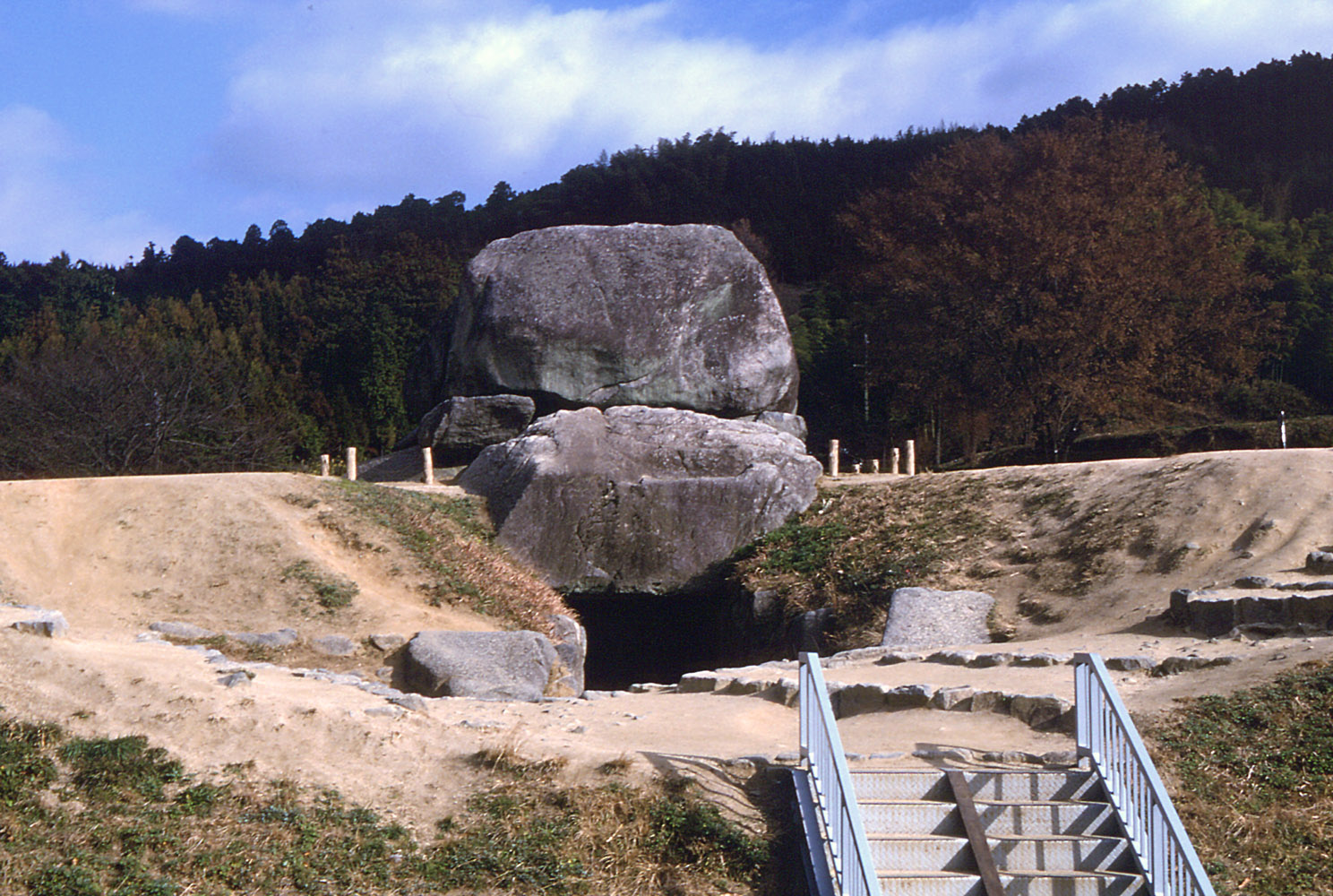
Ishibutai Kofun is considered likely to have been intended as the tomb of Soga no Umako.

Soga no Umako (蘇我 馬子; 551? – June 19, 626) was the son of Soga no Iname and a member of the powerful Soga clan of Japan. Conflicting evidence has suggested that Soga no Umako was actually an emperor during the Asuka period.

Umako conducted political reforms with Prince Shōtoku during the rules of Emperor Bidatsu and Empress Suiko and established the Soga clan's stronghold in the government by having his daughters married to members of the imperial family.

In the late 6th century, Soga no Umako went to great lengths to promote Buddhism in Japan, and was instrumental in its acceptance. At that time, the Soga clan employed immigrants from China and Korea, and worked to obtain advanced technology and other knowledge. In 587, Umako defeated Mononobe no Moriya in the Battle of Shigisan, securing Soga dominance. On January 15, 593, relics of Buddha Shakyamuni were deposited inside the foundation stone under the pillar of a pagoda at Asuka-dera (Hōkō-ji at the time), a temple whose construction Umako ordered, according to the Suiko section of the Nihon Shoki.

Ishibutai Kofun is believed to be the tomb of Soga no Umako.

== Genealogy ==
Soga no Umako's wife was a daughter of Mononobe no Ogushi and a sister of Mononobe no Moriya; they had five children.

- Soga no Emishi
- Soga no Kuramaro
- Kahakami no Iratsume, made consort of Emperor Sushun in 587, married to Yamato no Aya no Atahe in 592.
- Tojiko no Iratsume, consort of Shotoku Taishi
- Hode no Iratsume, consort of Emperor Jomei
