= Josei Tennō =

Imperial title for a Japanese empress regnant

Josei Tennō (女性天皇)
- Creation date: 686
- Created by: Empress Jitō
- First holder: Empress Suiko (retroactively) (Note: Suiko ruled during her life as sovereign in her own right but under different titulary than next female emperors.); Empress Jitō (officially)
- Last holder: Empress Go-Sakuramachi
- Subsidiary titles: None
- Status: Extinct (unless Japan allows female rulers again)
- Extinction date: 1889 (under the Imperial House Law of 1889, which barred women from ruling)
- Supporters: See polling

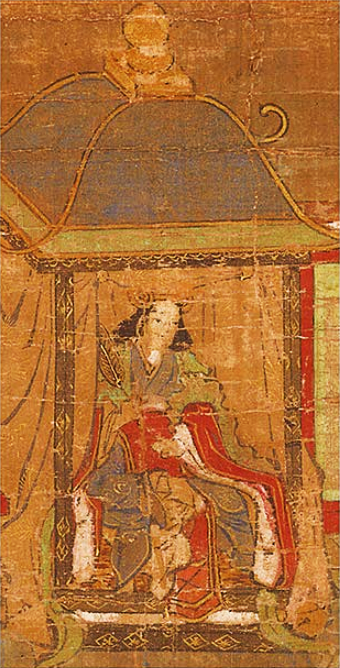
Empress Suiko, the first verifiable empress regnant

Josei Tennō (女性天皇) is a Japanese term referring to an empress regnant. (Note: Josei Tennō (女性天皇) literally means "female heavenly emperor".) Tennō is the title for the emperor; the addition of the term josei (女性, woman) distinguishes that the emperor is a woman. (Note: Jotei (女帝) may also refer to an empress regnant, but primarily of another country, not Japan. It literally means "female emperor".) It is distinct from the title Kōgō, which refers to an empress consort.

== Origins ==
Before Emperor Tenmu (the first to use the title Tennō), all monarchs were likely called Great King/Queen of Yamato, and not Tennō.

From the reign of Empress Jitō onwards, emperors (Tennō 天皇) who were women were distinguished from their male counterparts with the qualifier of josei (女性, woman). However, as empresses regnant, they held the rank of Tennō without the qualifier, indicating they were emperors equal to their male counterparts. Due to this, it is generally acceptable and preferred to use Tennō when referring to a female monarch.

Before the influence of the Fujiwara clan and their Five regent houses, and in times when an heir was underaged, a female relative (typically a sister or mother) would take the throne. Out of all empresses regnant, Empress Kōken (known as Shōtoku during her second reign) is the only one to have been granted the title "crown princess" before accession.

== Usage ==
When referring to female monarchs, they are referred to as "Tennō" and not "Josei Tennō". Tennō refers to individual monarchs, regardless of gender. Therefore, Empress Meishō would be properly referred to as Meishō Tennō, and not Meishō Josei Tennō.

Josei Tennō does not refer to individual female monarchs as a specific title. Instead, it refers to all the female monarchs in general (usually when distinguishing them from their male counterparts), or the concept of having a female monarch. As an example, during parliament debates, references to Josei Tennō are specifically related to the concept of having a woman (josei) succeed to the throne as an emperor, not the general concept of having a Tennō (an emperor). The addition of the qualifier josei specifies that the Tennō is a woman ruling as an emperor (i.e. an empress regnant) in her own right.

Josei Tennō should also not be confused with Jokei tennō (女系天皇) which is a female-line emperor (an emperor that gains their imperial blood solely through their mother, meaning their father is not the emperor or a prince). Of that there have been none.

== Jokei tennō ==
Jokei Tennō (女系天皇; literally meaning "matrilineal emperor") refers to an emperor whose imperial blood is solely on his mother's side. A female line emperor is heavily contested by conservatives in Japan. As of 2026 there has not been an emperor who was of imperial blood solely from his mother's side.

Historically verifiable debates on whether there should be a female emperor and female line emperor go back to at least the Meiji era. However the debate ended with the consensus that further discussions should not go through.

In the past, it is believed that anyone could succeed to the throne, regardless of gender, so long as they were of imperial blood (close enough related to be born a princess or prince). It is also believed there was no emphasis as to whether the line was passed through the male line or female line, and old Nara period succession laws used until the early modern period recognised the children of female emperor's as valid successors, meaning up until the Meiji Constitution a female line/matrilineal emperor (Jokei Tennō 女系天皇) was possible. The old imperial laws did not exclude female line descendents.

== List ==
Eight women have been recognized as empress regnant in Japan.

- Empress Suiko
  - When Suiko's husband Emperor Bidatsu, died, her brother Emperor Yōmei took the throne. However, Yōmei soon died of illness, and so Emperor Sushun took the throne. Sushun was assassinated and the throne was vacant. In a time of need, Suiko became the empress, and was given a regent, Prince Shōtoku. Despite having a regent, Suiko still exerted some of her own power, possibly even getting a say in who her regent would be. She was likely styled as great queen of Yamato, not Tennō, which only came into use under the reigns of Emperor Tenmu, and Empress Jitō. Suiko ruled until her death.
- Empress Kōgyoku
  - After taking the throne, Kōgyoku was soon forced to abdicate due to the Isshi incident, when Soga-no-Iruka was killed by her son, Naka no Ōe, in front of the empress, so the impure act would not stain her reign. She was succeeded by her brother, Emperor Kōtoku. Kōgyoku reigned a second time after Kōtoku's death, assuming the throne as Empress Saimei. As Empress Saimei, she led an army to aid their ally, Baekje, against an invasion by Silla. After arriving in Chikuzen Province with her army prepared to leave for Baekje, she fell ill and died.
- Empress Jitō
  - Jitō was the wife of Emperor Tenmu. After he died and her son Prince Kusakabe was deemed too young to rule, Jitō took the throne in his place until he was old enough. When Kusakabe died, Jitō remained as empress until her grandson came of age. Jitō was the first to be referred as "josei tennō"
- Empress Genmei
  - The wife of Jitō's son Kusakabe and Jitō's half-sister. After Genmei's son died, Genmei became empress. After copper was found near the capital, a new era in her honour (called the Wadō) was ushered in. The Kojiki was also completed under her reign. She was succeeded by her daughter, Empress Genshō.
- Empress Genshō
  - The daughter of Empress Genmei. Genshō helped complete the Nihon Shoki. She was also the only empress to be preceded by another (her predecessor being her own mother). In 724, Genshō abdicated in favor of her nephew, who would be known as Emperor Shōmu. She lived for 25 years after her abdication, never married, and had no children.
- Empress Kōken
  - The daughter of Emperor Shōmu and his consort, Empress Kōmyō. Her father proclaimed her the first crown princess in Japanese history in 738 to protect the bloodline of Prince Kusakabe. She succeeded Shōmu in 749, after her father resigned to become a Buddhist monk. Kōken's first reign was heavily controlled by mother, Empress Dowager Kōmyō. Kōken abdicated under pressure in 758, in favour of Emperor Junnin, and as a Daijō Tennō, she retired to become a nun. After Kōmyō's death, Junnin was deposed following the Fujiwara no Nakamaro Rebellion. Kōken, with her supporters, consolidated power to reassume the throne under a new name, Empress Shōtoku. She never married and did not declare an heir during her lifetime. Following her death, courtiers forged a letter which claimed Shōtoku had named her cousin Prince Shirakabe as her successor. Prince Shirakabe was also Shōtoku's brother-in-law through marriage to her half-sister and would succeed the throne as Emperor Kōnin.
- Empress Meishō
  - Meishō assumed the throne at five-years-old after her father, Emperor Go-Mizunoo, was forced to abdicate due to his involvement in the Purple Robe Incident. Meishō was given precedence to ascend the throne as the eldest surviving child of Emperor Go-Mizunoo and his empress, Tokugawa Masako, over her younger half-brothers, who were the children of concubines. Meishō did not hold much power as she assumed the throne as a child. Like her male counterparts at the time, by the time of her reign, the Shōgunate system was in place, limiting the monarch's power.
- Empress Go-Sakuramachi
  - Similar to Empress Meishō, she did not have much power due to the shogunate. She was the last josei tennō. On January 9, 1771, she abdicated in favor of her young nephew, Emperor Go-Momozono. The retired Empress held the position of Daijō Tennō in the forty years after her abdication and acted as a sort of guardian to subsequent emperors. Prior to Emperor Go-Momozono's death in 1779 at the age of 21, the retired empress Go-Sakuramachi arranged for her nephew to adopt Emperor Kōkaku as his son and heir to avoid a dynastic interregnum. Empress Go-Sakuramachi died in 1813.

Empress Jingū is not counted among the official monarchs. (Note: Jingū is only sometimes referred to as Tennō (天皇) and is typically referred to only as a regent, thus she does not count as a Josei Tennō either.) Princess Iitoyo's legitimacy and validity (concerning her reign) is mostly unknown or disputed, with it being believed she likely could have merely been a place holder.

== Women who almost became emperor ==
- Princess Kasuga no Yamada
  - Kasuga no Yamada was the empress of Emperor Ankan and was recommended by Emperor Kinmei to succeed to the throne. However she declined and instead Kinmei himself succeeded to the throne and she became the Empress Dowager. (Note: The Empress Dowager that Emperor Kinmei appointed may also be referring to his mother, Princess Tashiraka, or Princess Tachibana no Nakatsu, widow of Emperor Senka. As such, she's not counted among most lists of Empress Dowagers.)
- Princess Sakahito
  - Her father, Emperor Kōnin, attempted to have her succeed to the throne. While this failed, Emperor Kanmu made Princess Sakahito his wife.
- Princess Shōshi
  - She was considered for succession to the throne twice. Firstly following the death of Emperor Konoe, and later when Emperor Antoku fled west. During this time she was the de facto leader of Japan during this along with Emperor Go-Shirakawa. Furthermore, Shōshi was the favoured child of her father, Emperor Toba, and was the inheritor of the vast majority of his properties and estates, and was generally recognised as his successor (even if not his successor to the throne).
- Princess Akiko
  - She was the chosen successor of her father, Emperor Higashiyama. However the Emperor's initial plan to abdicate never came to fruition.

== The debate for a possible future Josei Tennō ==
The current Japanese rules of succession do not allow a woman to inherit the throne. Emperor Naruhito has admitted the imperial family is running out of male heirs. There have been calls to allow Aiko, Princess Toshi, the only child of Naruhito, to become the ninth empress regnant. To this day there is an ongoing succession debate. A public discussion was held in Tokyo in June 2023 called "Making Aiko the Imperial heir", which pushed for the rules to be changed and a new line of succession to be introduced, which would be as follows:

1. Aiko, Princess Toshi
2. Fumihito, Prince Akishino
3. Princess Kako of Akishino
4. Prince Hisahito of Akishino
5. Masahito, Prince Hitachi
6. Princess Akiko of Mikasa
7. Princess Yōko of Mikasa
8. Princess Tsuguko of Takamado

A parliamentary meeting was held in December 2023 to debate the possibility of female succession to the throne. In February 2024, former Prime Minister Yoshihiko Noda held another Parliament meeting, suggesting women should be allowed to marry without losing their titles, lead their own branch of the Imperial family, and possibly rule.

Princess Sumiko remained the last woman born into the Imperial family to lead a branch of the imperial family, until September 2025, when Princess Akiko of Mikasa became head of the Mikasa-no-miya branch. On March 15, 2024, there were more discussions within the ruling Liberal Democratic Party about allowing women to inherit the throne with discussions of women being allowed to retain their titles upon marriage on March 18 of the same year. As of June 2024, the LDP and opposition parties agreed women should marry without losing their title, with no conclusion on the status on their spouses. Shigeru Ishiba, who served as Japanese prime minister from 2024 to 2025, is known to support female succession.

The United Nations Committee on the Elimination of Discrimination against Women requested the succession laws be amended to allow female succession. Minister for Foreign Affairs Takeshi Iwaya expressed his displeasure in this request, stating “It is not appropriate for the committee to raise this issue in relation to the Imperial House Law”.

The current prime minister of Japan, Sanae Takaichi, is not in favour of female succession. In an interview with the magazine Bungei Shunju in 2021, she stated "I'm not opposed to a female emperor. I'm opposed to a matrilineal emperor", adding "[i]n reality, I imagine it would be difficult for a woman to succeed to the throne [...] it would be better to restore the former imperial families to the imperial family." She later went back on these comments, and has reaffirmed her opposition to female succession.

=== Stronger pushes on male adoption ===
On June 5, 2026, the speakers and deputy speakers of both houses of government have compiled a proposal on succession to the throne:

1. Imperial women are allowed retain their titles upon marriage.

We believe that, as it is consistent with the history of the Imperial Family and in light of considerations such as the continuity of public activities, the Imperial House Law should be amended and work should proceed on the specific design of the system. Furthermore, given that Their Imperial Highness the Imperial Princesses (Naishinnō) and Their Imperial Highnesses the Princesses (Joō) have lived their lives under the current system whereby they would lose their imperial status upon marriage, certain considerations should be made as transitional measures, such as respecting their wishes regarding whether or not to retain their status as members of the Imperial Family.

2. That former male members in the paternal branches of the imperial family be readmitted into the imperial house, and that the succession from Fumihito to Hisahito not be disrupted.

The specific framework of the system shall be designed to apply to male-line descendants of the male members of the so-called former 11 Imperial Houses.

These former male members will not have succession rights and shall only be adopted upon their expressed consent. Later the summary stated "The Government shall solemnly accept this 'consensus of the legislature', immediately commence drafting the bill, carry out the drafting work in good faith, report to the Vice-Speakers of the House of Representatives and the House of Councillors in advance once the outline of the bill has been finalised, and, once the draft bill has been completed, explain it to all parties and parliamentary groups at a plenary meeting. We strongly urge the Government to submit the bill to the Diet without delay once confirmation has been obtained." The proposal fails to bring up the titles of the spouses and children of imperial women, of which parties remain divided. The proposal states that parties should go over the proposal and it should be re-evaluated as a non permanent solution, as division still remains on female inheritance. Due to disagreements between parties, no legislature may be drawn during the remainder of the current diet session which ends on June 22. Opposition parties have continuously criticised the ruling parties for ignoring the possibility of a female emperor.

== Polling ==
Since 2019 and the enthronement of Emperor Naruhito, many polls have been published on support for a female emperor. Some major polls include the following:

Recent polls
Poll conducted by	Date	Amount polled	Percentage in favour	Poll type	Poll location	Reference
Shūkan Bunshun	April 29 - May 7, 2026	25,000	93% (Note: The poll also included results for those in favour of a matrilineal emperor (emperor in the female line). Of which 88.9% were in favour.)	By magazine	Nation wide	
The Yomiuri Shimbun	September 24 – October 31, 2025	2,004 (Note: 3,000 were contacted and 2,004 responded.)	69%	By mail	Nation wide	
Mainichi Shimbun	May 17 – 18, 2025	2,045	70%	Online	Nation wide	
Kyodo News	March – April 2024	1,966 (Note: 3,000 were polled, of which 1,966 gave valid responses)	90%	By mail	Nation wide	
Kyodo News	March – April 2020	1,899 (Note: 3,000 polled, with 1,899 valid responses)	85%	Domestic (Note: Source simply states "Domestic" for the polling type.)	Nation wide	
NHK	October 22, 2019	1,539 (Note: 2,790 were contacted, of which 1,539 responded)	70%	By telephone	Nation wide	
Kyodo News	October 2019	1,009	81%	By mail	Nation wide	

== Gallery ==
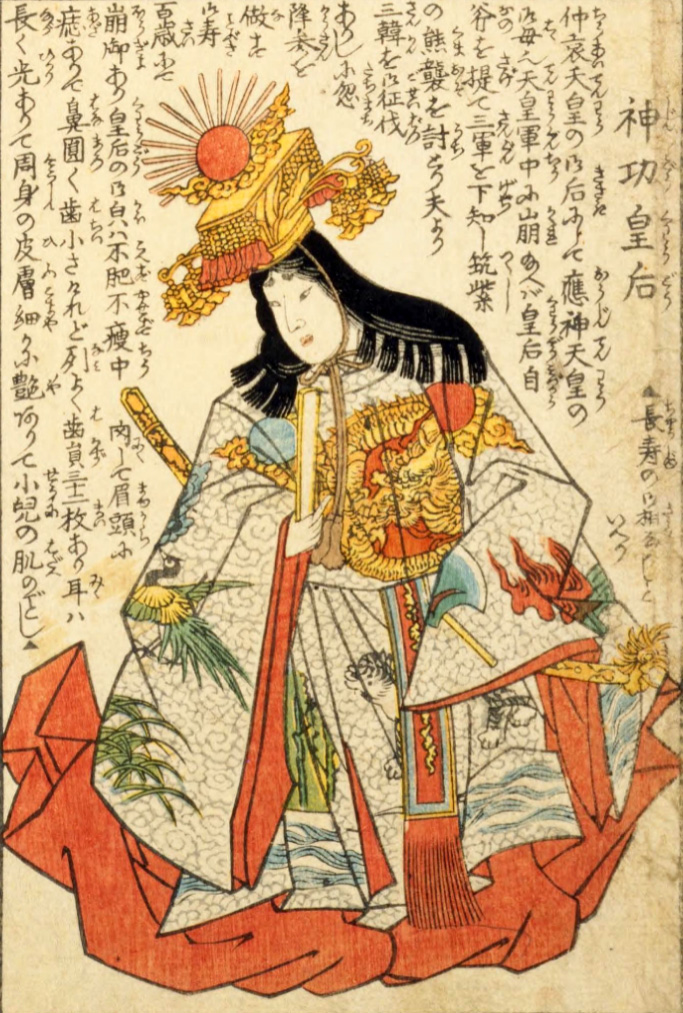
Empress Jingū, the first mythical empress regnant.

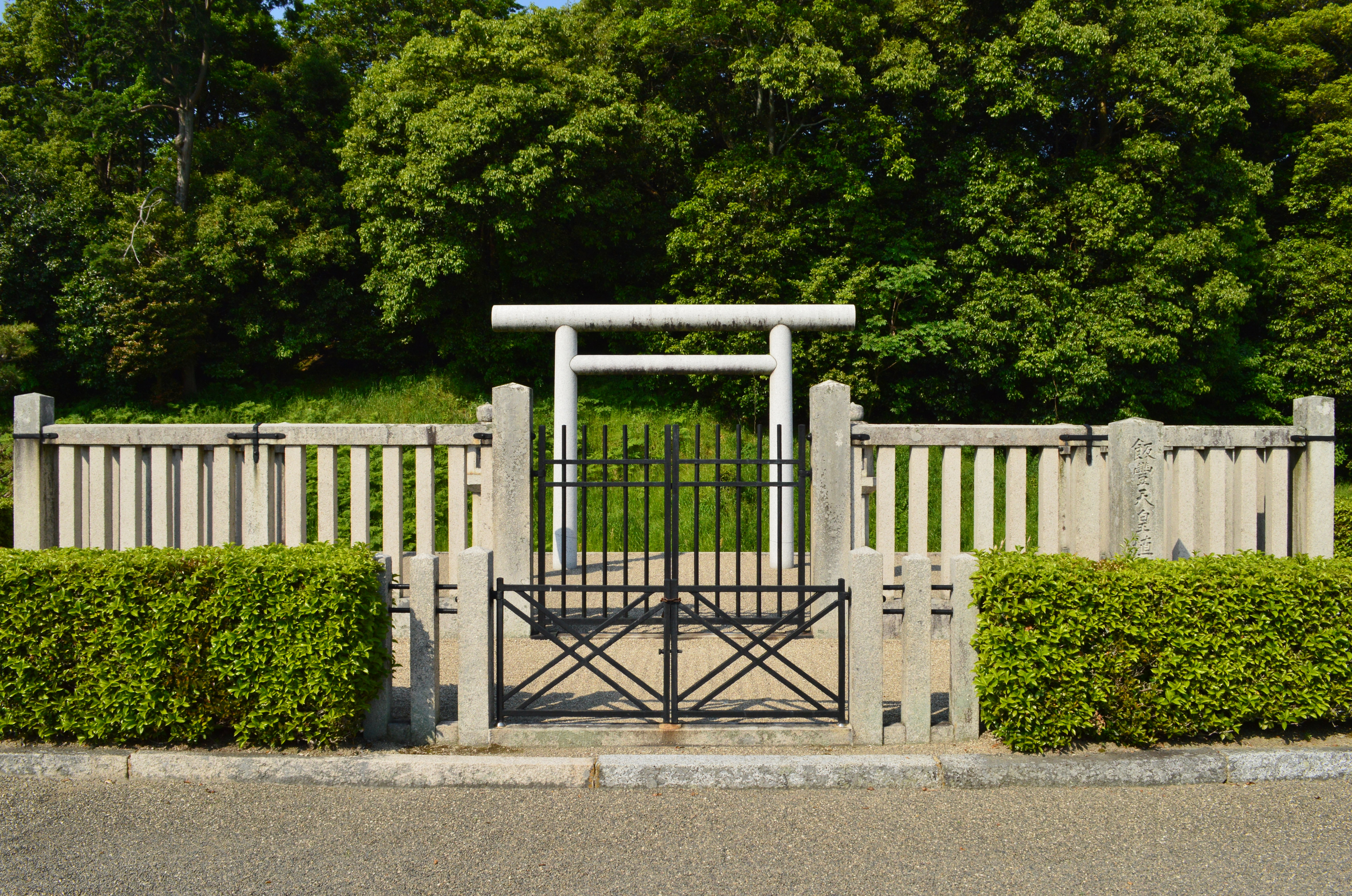
The tomb of Empress Iitoyo, also known as Empress Tsunuzashi. The validity of her reign is disputed.

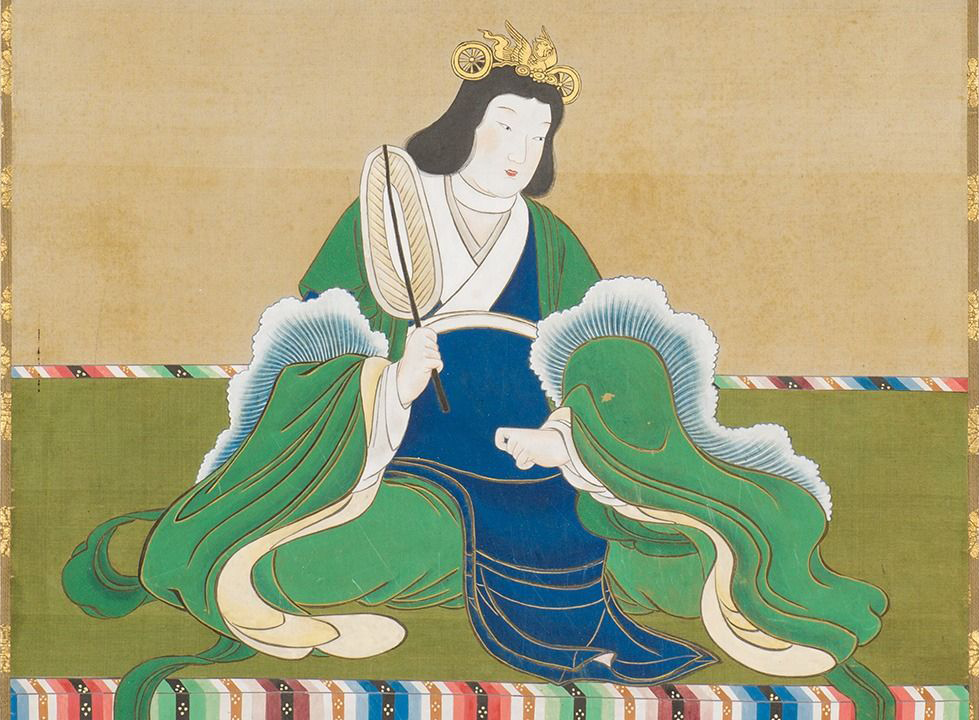
Empress Suiko, the first woman whose reign is historically verifiable.

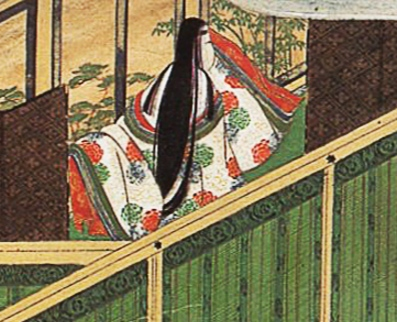
Empress Kōgyoku/Saimei, the second historically verifiable empress.

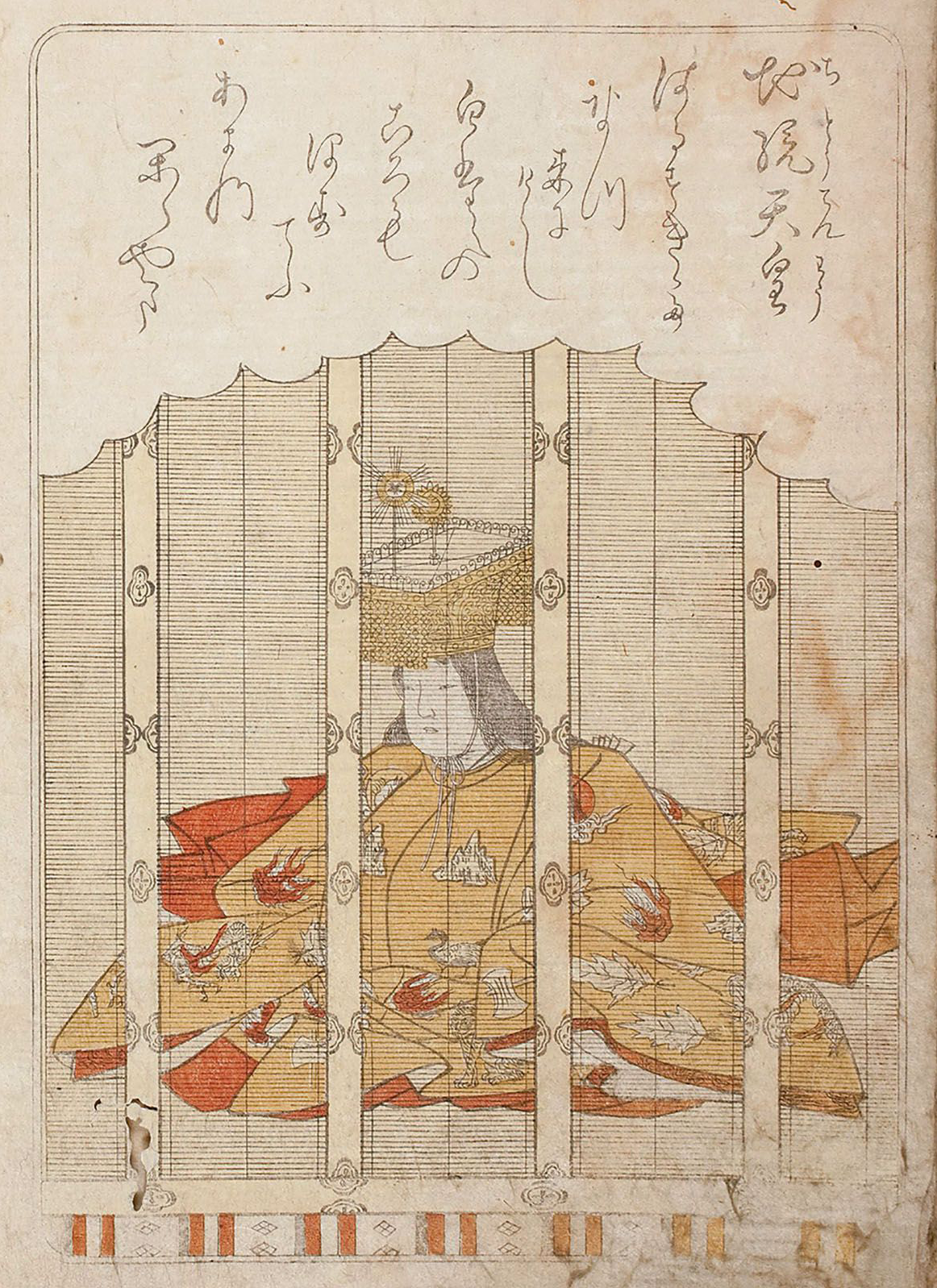
Empress Jitō, the third historically verifiable empress, first to use the title Josei Tennō

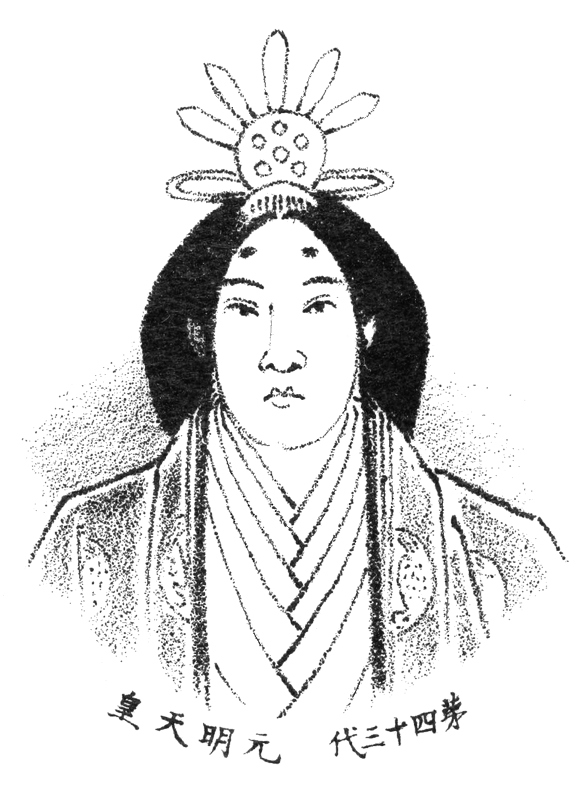
Empress Genmei, the fourth historically verifiable empress.

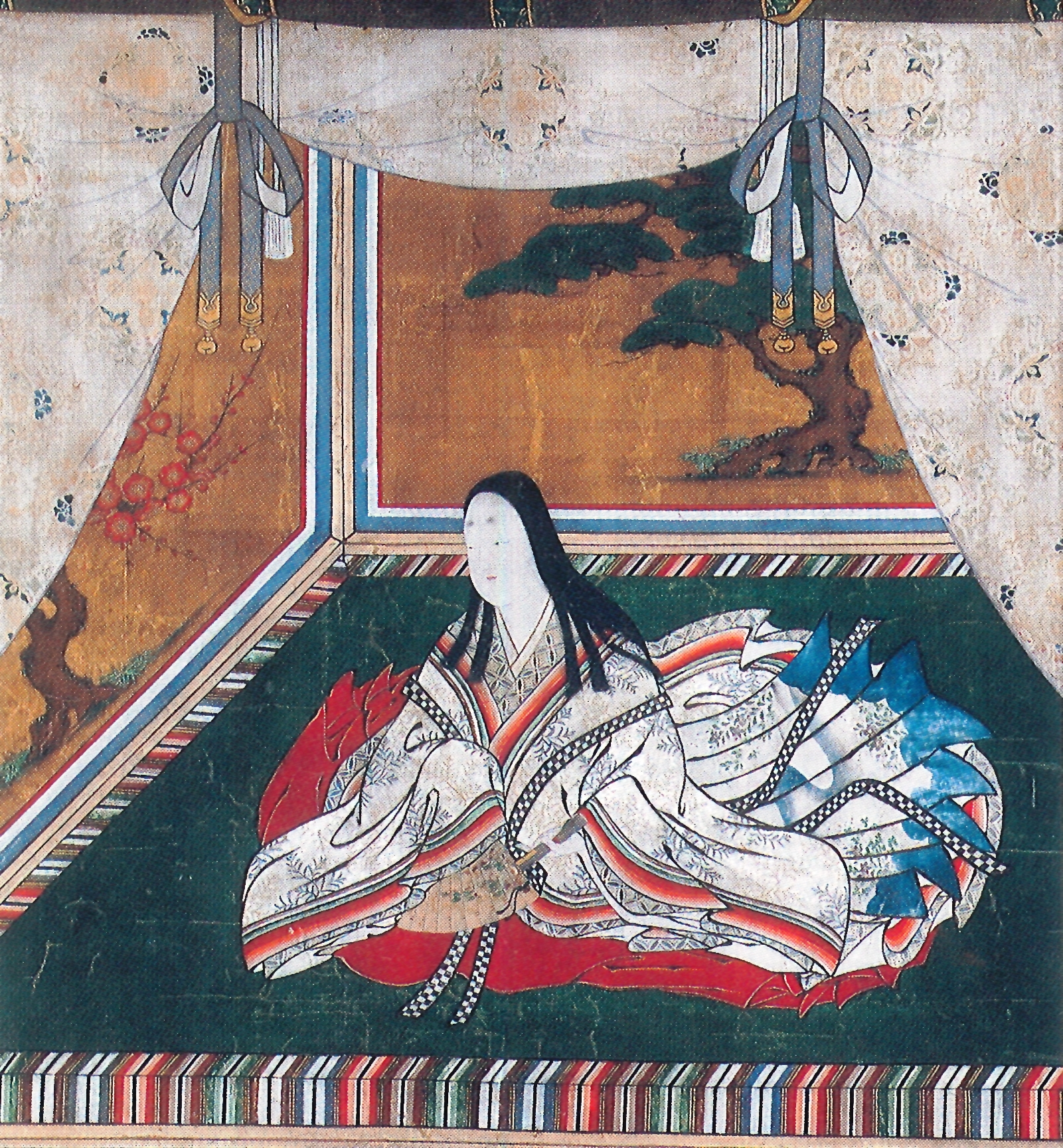
Empress Genshō, the fifth historically verifiable empress.

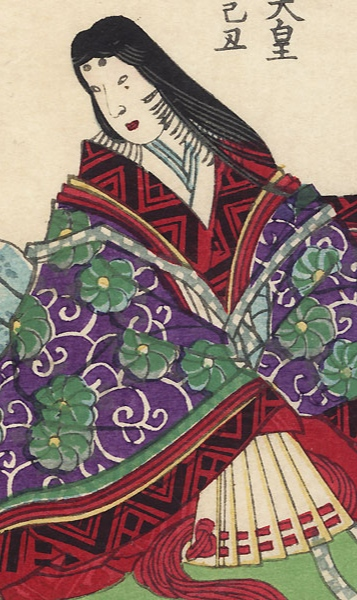
Empress Kōken/Shōtoku, the sixth historically verifiable empress.

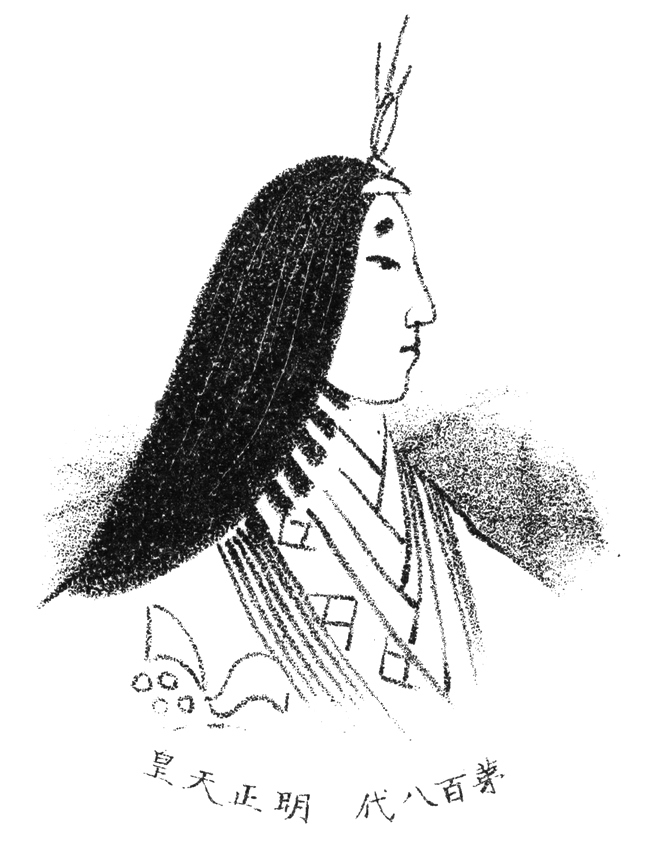
Empress Meishō, the seventh historically verifiable empress.

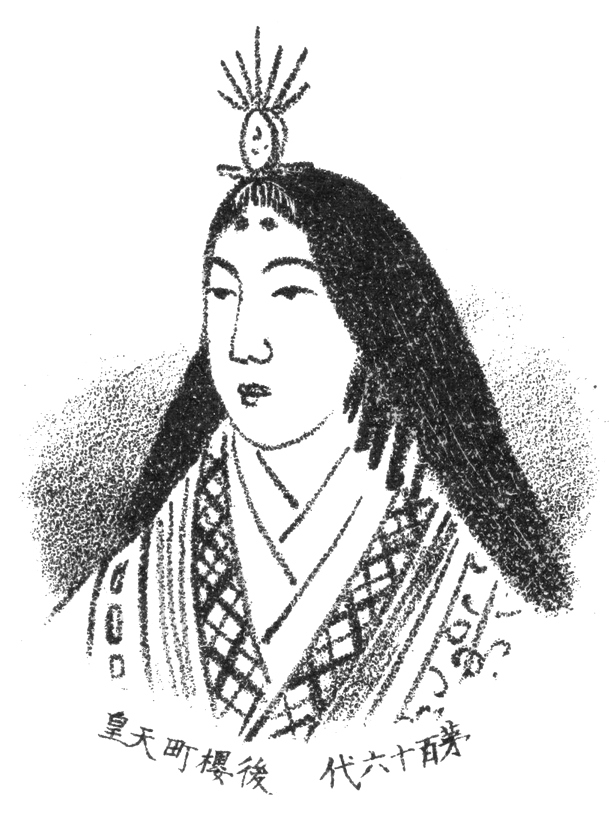
Empress Go-Sakuramachi, the eighth and final historically verifiable empress.

== See also ==
- Himiko
- Toyo
- Emperor of Japan
