= Princess Kasuga no Ōiratsume =

Kasuga no Ōiratsume

Empress consort of Japan
- Tenure: 488–499
- Spouse: Emperor Ninken
- Issue: Princess Takarashi-no-Oiratsume-hime; Princess Asazuma-hime; Empress Tashiraka; Princess Kusuhi; Empress Nakatsu; Emperor Buretsu; Princess Mawaka
- House: Imperial House of Japan
- Father: Emperor Yuryaku

Princess Kasuga no Ōiratsume (? – fl. 499) was Empress of Japan as the consort of Emperor Ninken.

She was the daughter of Emperor Yuryaku.

== Issue ==
  - Princess Takarashi-no-Oiratsume-Hime (高橋大娘皇女)
  - Princess Asazuma-Hime (朝嬬皇女)
  - Princess Tashiraka (手白香皇女; b. 489), married to Emperor Keitai
  - Princess Kusuhi (樟氷皇女)
  - Princess Tachibana no Nakatsu (橘仲皇女), married to Emperor Senka
  - Prince Ohatsuse no Wakasazaki (小泊瀬稚鷦鷯尊), later Emperor Buretsu
  - Princess Mawaka (真稚皇女)

== Notes ==
Japanese royalty
Preceded by Princess Naniwa no Ono	Empress consort of Japan; 488–499	Succeeded by Kasuga no Iratsume
