= Keitai–Kinmei Civil War =

Japanese civil war

The Keitai–Kinmei Civil War (継体・欽明朝の内乱, Keitai–Kinmeichō no Nairan) is a hypothetical civil war in Japanese history. It is based on the assumption that the death of Emperor Keitai in the first half of the 6th century triggered a struggle over the succession to the throne, but remains speculative because the documents recording the period contain inconsistencies. The assumed year is sometimes set as 531, the year of Emperor Keitai's death according to the Nihon Shoki. 531 in the sexagenary cycle of dating is Heavenly Stem Metal (辛), Earthly Branch Pig (亥), so it is also known as the "Perverse event of Metal Pig" (辛亥の変, Shingai no Hen).

== Outline ==
According to the Nihon Shoki, the year Keitai died was the Metal Pig year, based on the fragments of the history of Baekche about Waekoku (Japan) called the Kudara Honki (百済本記) in Japanese. Another theory places his death in the year of the Tiger (534). This is considered the year of the accession of the next emperor, Ankan, which is usually interpreted as a two-year vacancy following the death of Emperor Keitai.

However, several questions emerge here.

- The article on the year of the Metal Pig in the Kudara Honki states, "The Japanese emperor, his son, and his son-in-law all collapsed." (Note: 「又聞 日本天皇及太子皇子 倶崩薨 由此而言 辛亥之歳 當廿五年矣」)
- In the Jōgū Shōtoku Hōō Teisetsu and the Gangōji Garan Engi, the year of Kinmei's accession is 531, as if he had been the next ruler after Keitai.
- In the Kojiki, Keitai is said to have died in the year 527.

The interpretation of these discrepancies has been the subject of debate since the theory gained attention in the Meiji period.

The first theory to emerge was that Keitai died in 527 and Kinmei ascended to the throne in 531, with the reigns of Ankan and Senka assumed in the intervening four years. This theory is inconsistent with the fact that both the Kojiki and the Nihon Shoki record Ankan's death in 535.

In the Shōwa era, Kida Sadakichi proposed the hypothesis that a political crisis occurred in 531. As a result, after the death of Emperor Keitai, the Yamato Kingship split into two lines. These would be the Ankan-Senka line, whose mother was Menoko hime, from a local powerful family, (Note: 宣化天皇は安閑天皇の同母弟。) and Kinmei, whose mother was Tashiraka hime, the daughter of Ninken. (Note: 欽明天皇は安閑・宣化天皇の異母弟。ただし、母方を通じて武烈天皇で断絶したそれ以前の皇統の血を引いていることになり、当然母親の格式も高い。)

This idea was taken one step further by Hayashiya Tatsusaburō after World War II, who proposed that confusion over conflicts over the Korean Peninsula situation (such as the Iwai Rebellion) occurred at the end of the reign of Emperor Keitai, and that after his death, "two parallel dynasties" and a civil war followed. To conceal this fact, the Nihon Shoki is said to have been written as if half-brothers had ascended to the throne in the order of their ages.

The Kudara Honki is no longer extant. Furthermore, since the Kudara Honki is a history of Baekje, some have questioned the reliability of the articles related to Waekoku. Even if it is true that an emperor died in 531, it is unclear to whom this refers. Therefore, there could have been no "juxtaposition of two dynasties" or civil war. Some scholars believe that the succession to the imperial throne during this period should be based on the account in the Nihon Shoki that states that, after the demise of the successor to the throne, his successors, Ankan and Senka, died within a short period, resulting in the succession from Keitai to Ankan, then to Senka, then to Kinmei.

Furthermore, even among scholars who support the "two dynasties in parallel," Hayashiya's theory is not always fully supported. For example, Hayashiya argues that behind Kinmei stood the Soga clan, which was married to the emperor, and behind Ankan and Senka stood the Ōtomo clan, which declined during this period. However, others the background as opposing, such as the conflict between the local powerful tribes that supported Keitai and his successor and the powerful Yamato clans that sought to regain power by supporting Kinmei, who was descended from the previous imperial lineage. (Note: 継体天皇は遠い皇孫でありながら近江・越前を根拠として、武烈天皇崩御後の混乱の後に実力で皇位に就いた。『日本書紀』には平穏な即位が謳われているが、実際には大和入りに20年もかかっていることから即位に反発する勢力も存在して政情不安を抱えていたとみられている。) Another theory is that it was a conflict between two powerful tribes who were identified as 臣 and 連.

The period from Keitai's reign to Kinmei's in the late Kofun period is said to have been marked by a series of significant events that would later shape the history of Japan, including the official transmission of Buddhism, the establishment of a network of kura for rice, the compilation of the Teiki and Kyūji, the introduction of posthumous names, and the Musashi no Kuni no Miyatsuko Rebellion. It is believed that the existence or non-existence of "two parallel dynasties" and the occurrence of civil wars had no small influence on the interpretation of these events.

== Bibliography ==
- 直木孝次郎「継体・欽明朝の内乱」『国史大辞典 5』（吉川弘文館 1985年） ISBN 978-4-642-00505-0
- 川口勝康「継体・欽明朝の内乱」『日本史大事典 2』（平凡社 1993年） ISBN 978-4-582-13102-4
- 大平聡「継体・欽明朝の内乱」『日本歴史大事典 1』（小学館 2000年） ISBN 978-4-09-523001-6
