= Emperor Kinmei =

Emperor of Japan from 539 to 571

Kinmei 欽明天皇
- Great King of Yamato
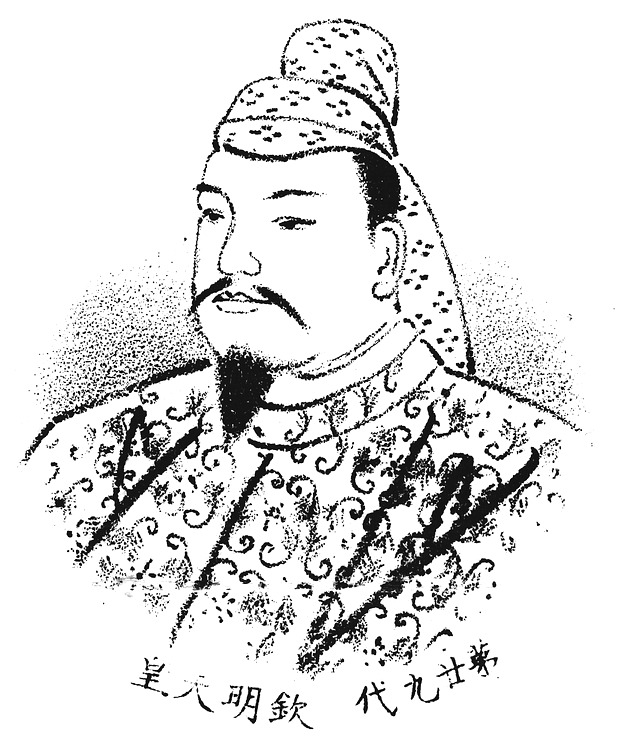
- Emperor Kinmei, from "Rekidai Son'ei" (Portraits of Japanese Emperors) by Kōtarō Miyake, 1894

Emperor of Japan
- Reign: December 5, 539 – April 15, 571
- Predecessor: Senka
- Successor: Bidatsu
- Born: 509; Japan
- Died: 15 April 571 (aged 62); Asuka, Yamato
- Burial: Hinokuma no saki Ai no misasagi (檜隈坂合陵) (Nara)
- Spouse: Ishi-hime
- Issue among others...: Emperor Sushun; Emperor Bidatsu; Emperor Yōmei; Empress Suiko
Posthumous name
- Chinese-style shigō: Emperor Kinmei (欽明天皇) Japanese-style shigō: Amekuni-oshiharaki-hironiwa no Sumeramikoto (天国排開広庭天皇)
- House: Imperial House of Japan
- Father: Emperor Keitai
- Mother: Princess Tashiraka
- Religion: Shinto

Emperor Kinmei (欽明天皇, Kinmei-tennō; 509–571) was the 29th emperor of Japan, according to the traditional order of succession. His reign is said to have spanned the years from 539 to 571. Most historians support either the view that Kinmei is the first historically verifiable Japanese emperor or the view that Yuryaku (the 21st) is.

== Traditional narrative ==
Kinmei's contemporary title would not have been tennō, as most historians believe this title was not introduced until the reigns of Emperor Tenmu and Empress Jitō. Rather, it was presumably Sumeramikoto or Amenoshita Shiroshimesu Ōkimi (治天下大王), meaning "the great king who rules all under heaven". Alternatively, Kinmei might have been referred to as ヤマト大王/大君 or the "Great King of Yamato".

=== Events of Kinmei's life ===
Because of several chronological discrepancies in the account of Emperor Kinmei in the Nihon Shoki, some believe that he was actually ruling a rival court to that of Emperors Ankan and Senka. Nevertheless, according to the traditional account, it was not until the death of Emperor Kinmei's older brother Emperor Senka that he gained the throne.

Before he came to the throne (at least according to the Nihon Shoki) he was hesitant and refused to wield power stating:

I am young in years, and of shallow knowledge. I have not yet had experience of the affairs of government. The Empress Yamada has a clear acquaintance with all matters of administration, and I pray you to apply to her and then decide.

The Empress, Kasuga no Yamada, refused this believing Kinmei was compassionate and smart enough to rule. However, historians such as William George Aston have questioned this with Aston himself noting that:

A brother had died four years before, aged seventy, and another had just died, aged seventy-three. Kimmei is said to have died A.D. 571, at the age of sixty-three, or eighty-one, by another account. Evidently the chronology is not yet quite satisfactory.

According to this account, Emperor Senka died in 539 at the age of 73; and succession passed to the third son of Emperor Keitai. This Imperial Prince was the next youngest brother of Emperor Senka. He would come to be known as Emperor Kinmei. He established his court at Shikishima no Kanazashi Palace (磯城嶋金刺宮) in Yamato.

The Emperor's chief counselors were:

- Ōomi (Great Imperial chieftain): Soga no Iname no Sukune, also known as Soga no Iname.
- Ōmuraji (Great Deity chieftain): Monotobe Okoshi no Muraji, also known as Mononobe no Okoshi.
- Ōmuraji (Great Deity chieftain): Ōtomo Kanamura Maro, also known as Otomo no Kanamura.

Although the imperial court was not moved to the Asuka region of Japan until 592, Emperor Kinmei's rule is considered by some to be the beginning of the Asuka period of Yamato Japan, particularly by those who associate the Asuka period primarily with the introduction of Buddhism to Japan from Baekje.

According to the Nihon Shoki, Emperor Kinmei received a bronze statue of Gautama Buddha as a gift from King Song Myong (聖明王, Seimei Ō) of Baekje, alongside a significant envoy of artisans, monks, and other artifacts in 552. Though some regard this event as the official introduction of Buddhism to Japan, texts such as the Jōgū Shōtoku Hōō Teisetsu indicate Buddhism may have been introduced as early as 538.

The advent of Buddhism across the Japanese Archipelago contributed to a deep rift between the Mononobe clan, whose members supported the worship of Japan's traditional deities, and the Soga clan, whose members supported the adoption of Buddhism.

According to the Nihon Shoki, Emperor Kinmei ruled until his death in 571. Although the text states that Emperor Kinmei was buried in the Hinokuma no Sakai Burial Mound (桧隈坂合陵), the current scholarly consensus instead holds that he is more likely to have been buried in the Misemaruyama Tumulus (見瀬丸山古墳), located in Kashihara City (橿原市).

The Emperor is traditionally venerated at a memorial Shinto shrine (misasagi) at Nara. The Imperial Household Agency designates the Nara location as Kinmei's mausoleum, and is formally named Hinokuma no saki Ai no misasagi. Its status as the emperor's actual resting place, alongside other graves of the early Emperors, are held in dispute by some historians and archaeologists.

== Genealogy ==
Emperor Kinmei's father was Emperor Keitai and his mother was Emperor Ninken's daughter, Princess Tashiraka (手白香皇女, Tashiraka no himemiko). In his lifetime, he was known by the name Amekuni Oshiharaki Hironiwa (天国排開広庭).

Kinmei had six Consorts and 25 Imperial children (16 sons and 9 daughters). According to Nihongi, he had six wives, but the Kojiki gives only five wives; identifying the third consort to be the same as the sixth one. The first three were his nieces, daughters of his half-brother Emperor Senka; two others were sisters, daughters of the Omi Soga no Iname.

- Empress: Ishi-hime (石姫皇女), Emperor Senka's daughter
  - First son: Prince Yata no Tamakatsu no Ōe (箭田珠勝大兄皇子; d. 552)
  - Second son: Prince Nunakura Futotama-Shiki (渟中倉太珠敷尊), later Emperor Bidatsu
  - Princess Kasanui (笠縫皇女)
- Consort: Princess Wayaka-Hime (稚綾姫皇女), Emperor Senka's daughter
  - Prince Iso no Kami (石上皇子; b. c. 539–540)
- Consort: Princess Hikage (日影皇女), Emperor Senka's daughter
  - Prince Kura (倉皇子), in the Kojiki as Soga no Kura (宗賀之倉王)
- Consort: Soga no Kitashihime (蘇我堅塩媛), Soga no Iname's daughter
  - Fourth Son: Imperial Prince Ogetaroinogushiwamikoto (大兄皇子), later Prince Shōtoken, adoptive father of Prince Shōtoku
  - Imperial Princess Iwakuma-hime (磐隈皇女), Saiō; had to resign her charge after being convicted of intrigue with her half-brother Imperial Prince Mubaragi
  - Prince Atori (臘嘴鳥皇子), also 足取王
  - Princess Ishiroi-Hime (額田部皇女), later Empress Dowager Kitano-Hime, married to Emperor Bidatsu
  - Prince Maroko (椀子皇子), also 麻呂古王
  - Princess Ohoyake (大宅皇女)
  - Prince Iso no Kami Be (石上部皇子)
  - Prince Yamashiro (山背皇子), also 山代王
  - Princess Ohotomo (大伴皇女; b. 560), married to her nephew, Prince Oshisako no Hikohito no Oe, Emperor Bidatsu's son
  - Sixth Son: Prince Sakurai (桜井皇子; 560–587), also 桜井之玄王
  - Princess Katano (肩野皇女), also 麻奴王
  - Prince Tachibana Moto no Wakugo (橘本稚皇子)
  - Princess Toneri (舎人皇女; 565–603), also 泥杼王, married to her nephew, Prince Maroko, Emperor Yōmei's son
  - Emperor Yōmei (用明天皇)
- Consort: Soga no Oane (蘇我小姉君), Soga no Iname's daughter
  - Prince Umaraki (茨城皇子), also 馬木王
  - Prince Kazuraki (葛城皇子)
  - Third daughter: Princess Hasetsukabe-no-Anahobe-no-Hashihito (穴穂部間人皇女; 560–621), married to her half brother, Emperor Yōmei, later married to her nephew and stepson, Prince Tame (Emperor Yōmei's son)
  - Prince Amatsukabe Anahobe (穴穂部皇子; d. 587)
  - Prince Kōshiko (泊瀬部皇子), later Kimiyori no Kimitsuhi
  - Prince Yakabe (宅部皇子; d. 587), speculated as Emperor Senka's son
- Consort: Nukako (糠子), Kasuga no Hifuri no Omi's daughter
  - Princess Kasuga no Yamada (春日山田皇女)
  - Prince Tachibana no Maro (橘麻呂皇子), also 麻呂古王

== See also ==
- The civil war of the Keitai and Kinmei dynasties
- Emperor of Japan
- List of Emperors of Japan
- Imperial cult

== Notes ==
Regnal titles
Preceded by Emperor Senka	Emperor of Japan: Kinmei; 539–571	Succeeded by Emperor Bidatsu
