= Emperor Ninken =

Emperor of Japan from 488 to 498

Emperor Ninken 仁賢天皇
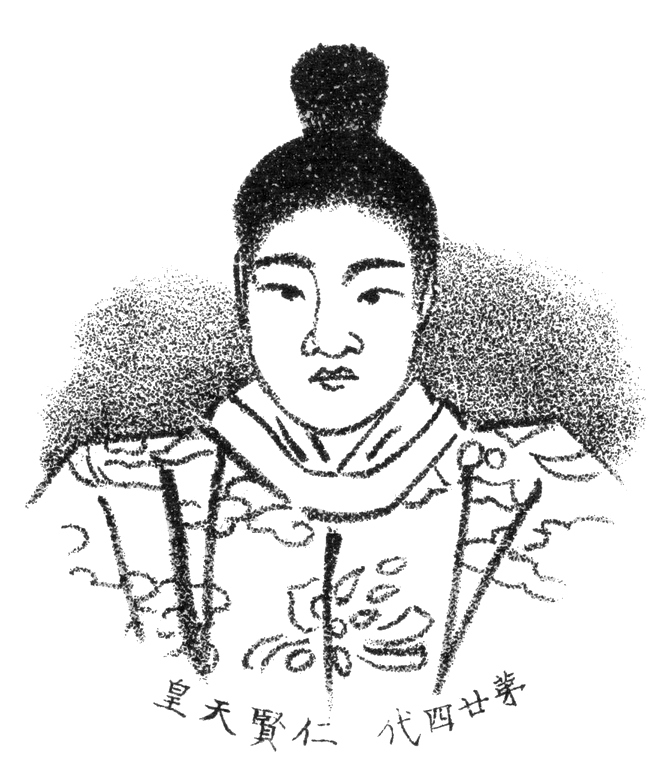

Emperor of Japan
- Reign: 4 February 488 – 9 September 498 (traditional)
- Predecessor: Kenzō
- Successor: Buretsu
- Born: 449; Japan
- Died: 9 September 498 (aged 48–49); Tenri, Japan
- Burial: Hanyū no Sakamoto no misasagi (埴生坂本陵) (Osaka)
- Spouse: Kasuga no Ōiratsume
- Issue among others...: Emperor Buretsu
Posthumous name
- Chinese-style shigō: Emperor Ninken (仁賢天皇) Japanese-style shigō: Oke no Sumeramikoto (億計天皇)
- House: Imperial House of Japan
- Father: Ichinobe no Oshiwa
- Mother: Wae-hime

Emperor Ninken (仁賢天皇, Ninken-tennō) (449 – 9 September 498) was the 24th legendary emperor of Japan, according to the traditional order of succession. No firm dates can be assigned to this emperor's life or reign, but he is conventionally considered to have reigned from 4 February 488 to 9 September 498.

== Legendary narrative ==
Ninken is considered to have ruled the country during the late-5th century, but there is a paucity of information about him. There is insufficient material available for further verification and study.

In his youth, he was known as Prince Oke (億計). Along with his younger brother, Prince Woke, Oke was raised to greater prominence when Emperor Seinei died without an heir. The two young princes were said to be grandsons of Emperor Richū. Each of these brothers would ascend the throne as adopted heirs of Seinei, although it is unclear whether they had been "found" in Seinei's lifetime or only after that.

Oke's younger brother, who would become posthumously known as Emperor Kenzō, ascended before his elder brother. This unconventional sequence was in accordance with an agreement made by the two brothers.

== Ninken's reign ==
When Emperor Kenzo died without heirs, Prince Oke succeeded him as Emperor Ninken.

Ninken's contemporary title would not have been tennō, as most historians believe this title was not introduced until the reigns of Emperor Tenmu and Empress Jitō. Rather, it was presumably Sumeramikoto or Amenoshita Shiroshimesu Ōkimi (治天下大王), meaning "the great king who rules all under heaven". Alternatively, Ninken might have been referred to as ヤマト大王/大君 or the "Great King of Yamato".

Ninken married to Emperor Yūryaku's daughter Kasuga no Ōiratsume no Himemiko, a second cousin of him. Their daughter Tashiraka was later married to Emperor Keitai, successor or possibly usurper after her brother, and became mother of Emperor Kinmei, a future monarch and lineal ancestor of all future monarchs of Japan. There apparently was also another daughter, Princess Tachibana, who in turn is recorded to have become a wife of Senka and mother of Princess Iwahime, who herself became a consort of Kimmei and bore Emperor Bidatsu, a future monarch and lineal ancestor of current monarchs of Japan.

Ninken was succeeded by his son, who would accede as Emperor Buretsu.

The actual site of Ninken's grave is not known. The Emperor is traditionally venerated at a memorial Shinto shrine (misasagi) at Osaka.

The Imperial Household Agency designates this location as Ninken's mausoleum. It is formally named Hanyū no Sakamoto no misasagi.

== Consorts and children ==
- Empress (Kōgō) : Princess Kasuga no Ōiratsume (春日大娘皇女), Emperor Yūryaku's daughter
  - Princess Takarashi-no-Oiratsume-Hime (高橋大娘皇女)
  - Princess Asazuma-Hime (朝嬬皇女)
  - Princess Tashiraka (手白香皇女; b. 489), married to Emperor Keitai
  - Princess Kusuhi (樟氷皇女)
  - Princess Tachibana no Nakatsu (橘仲皇女), married to Emperor Senka
  - Prince Ohatsuse no Wakasazaki (小泊瀬稚鷦鷯尊), later Emperor Buretsu
  - Princess Mawaka (真稚皇女)
- Consort (Hi) : Nukakimi-no-Iratsume (糠君娘), Wani Nitsume's daughter
  - Princess Kasuga no Yamada (春日山田皇女; d.539), married to Emperor Ankan

== See also ==
- Emperor of Japan
- List of Emperors of Japan
- Imperial cult

== Notes ==
Japanese Imperial kamon — a stylized chrysanthemum blossom

Regnal titles
Preceded by Emperor Kenzō	Emperor of Japan: Ninken; 4 February 488 – 9 September 498 (traditional dates)	Succeeded by Emperor Buretsu
