= Princess Kasuga no Yamada =

Kasuga no Yamada
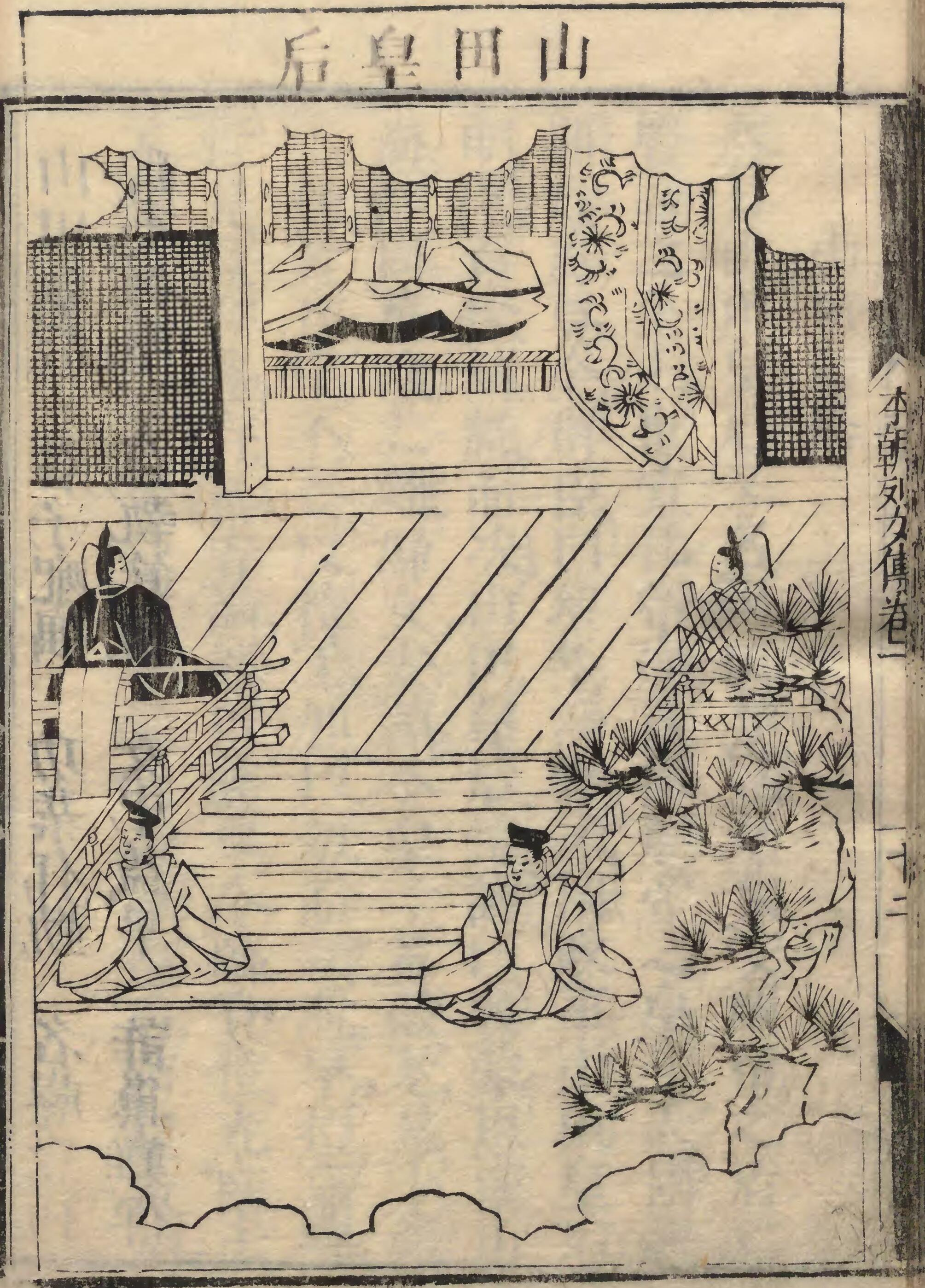

Empress consort of Japan
- Tenure: 534–536
- Spouse: Emperor Ankan
- House: Imperial House of Japan
- Father: Emperor Ninken

Princess Kasuga no Yamada (? – d. 539) was Empress of Japan as the consort of Emperor Ankan.

She was the daughter of Emperor Ninken and was married in 513. Before the ascension of Emperor Kinmei, Kinmei recommended that Princess Kasuga no Yamada become the empress regnant herself. The empress consort declined this however and Kinmei himself succeeded.

According to the Nihon Shoki, Emperor Kinmei did not want to succeed to the throne as he felt he was too young, adding that Princess Kasuga no Yamada had "a clear acquaintance with all matters of administration". She rejected this offer stating

Your handmaiden has been treated with favour, far beyond seas and mountains. But the manifold machinery of government is much too difficult a charge for a woman to undertake it. Now the Imperial Prince honours age, and shows affection to the young. He treats the wise with courtesy, and all day long neglects his food while he attends to others. Not only so, but young as he is, the point comes through. Already he has at his disposal an auspicious reputation, he is of a mild disposition and earnest in compassionate care. I pray the Ministers that they will, without delay, cause him to ascend to the Dignity, and preside gloriously over the Empire.

If this had happened, and assuming that this encounter was true (or, if it was not, if Kinmei did truly offer her the throne in some way) she would have become the first undisputed female emperor of Japan. Due to her declining, it would be Kinmei's own daughter, Empress Suiko in 592, that would become Japan's first female emperor. (Note: The Empress Dowager that Emperor Kinmei appointed may also be referring to his mother, Princess Tashiraka, or Princess Tachibana no Nakatsu, widow of Emperor Senka. As such, she is not counted among most lists of empress dowagers.)

== Notes ==
Japanese royalty
Preceded by Princess Tashiraka	Empress consort of Japan; 534–536	Succeeded by Princess Tachibana no Nakatsu
