= Princess Sukatehime =

Japanese princess and saiō for 37 years

Princess Sukatehime 酢香手姫皇女

Saiō
- Tenure: 586–622
- Predecessor: Princess Uji
- Successor: Princess Ōku
- House: Imperial House of Japan
- Father: Emperor Yōmei
- Mother: Katsuragi Hiroko
- Religion: Shinto

Princess Sukatehime (酢香手姫皇女) was saiō for 37 years. Her reign spanned the years 586 to 622 before her retirement and spanned the reigns of Emperor Yōmei, Emperor Sushun and Empress Suiko. She is the last pre-Saikū saiō.

== Life ==
Princess Sukatehime was born to Emperor Yōmei and a consort named Katsuragi Hiroko. Under the reign of her uncle, Emperor Bidatsu, the saiō had been her cousin, Princess Uji. However Princess Uji was dismissed after less than one year. Thus, when Princess Sukatehime's father, Emperor Yōmei succeeded to the throne, the position of saiō was vacant, and thus Sukatehime was appointed saiō.

When her father died, Sukatehime remained as saiō, and thus a new saiō was not chosen.

Sukatehime would continue to rule as saiō for the next two successive emperors, Sushun, and Suiko. Both her half-uncle and aunt respectively.

After 37 years, Sukatehime retired from her position. She retired in 622 and according to some versions of the Nihon-Shoki may have passed away soon after.
