= Princess Ishi-hime =

Ishi-hime

Empress consort of Japan
- Tenure: 540–572

Empress dowager of Japan
- Tenure: appointed in 572
- Died: after 572
- Spouse: Emperor Kinmei
- Issue: Prince Yata no Tamakatsu no Ōe; Emperor Bidatsu; Princess Kasanui
- House: Imperial House of Japan
- Father: Emperor Senka

Princess Ishi-hime (? – after 572) ("stone princess") was Empress of Japan as the consort of Emperor Kinmei.

Ishi-hime was the daughter of Emperor Senka and his empress, Tachibana no Nakatsu.

With Emperor Kinmei, Princess Ishi-hime bore children.

  - First son: Prince Yata no Tamakatsu no Ōe (箭田珠勝大兄皇子; d. 552)
  - Second son: Prince Nunakura Futotama-Shiki (渟中倉太珠敷尊), later Emperor Bidatsu
  - Princess Kasanui (笠縫皇女)

== Notes ==
Japanese royalty
| Preceded by Princess Tachibana no Nakatsu | Empress consort of Japan; 540–571 | Succeeded by Hirohime |
| Preceded by Princess Tachibana no Nakatsu | Empress dowager of Japan appointed in 572 | Succeeded by Fujiwara Asukabehime |
