= Princess Tashiraka =

Empress consort of Japan
- Tenure: 507–531
- Spouse: Emperor Keitai
- Issue: Prince Amekunioshiharakihironiwa; Emperor Kinmei
- House: Imperial House of Japan
- Father: Emperor Ninken
- Mother: Princess Kasuga no Ōiratsume

Princess Tashiraka (? – fl. 531) was Empress of Japan as the (possibly fictional) consort of the legendary emperor Emperor Keitai. She gave birth to two children, including the future Emperor Kimmei.

She was the daughter of Emperor Ninken and Princess Kasuga no Ōiratsume, and the sister of Keitai's predecessor, Emperor Buretsu.

== Issue ==
- Prince Amekunioshiharakihironiwa (天国排開広庭尊), later Prince Ahohiko
- Emperor Kinmei (欽明天皇)

== Notes ==
Japanese royalty
Preceded by Kasuga no Iratsume	Empress consort of Japan; 507–531	Succeeded by Princess Kasuga no Yamada
