= Princess Uji =

Daughter of Emperor Bidatsu, and saiō for less than one year

Princess Uji 菟道皇女

Saiō
- Tenure: 578
- Predecessor: Princess Iwakuma
- Successor: Princess Sukatehime
- House: Imperial house of Japan
- Father: Emperor Bidatsu
- Mother: Hirohime

Princess Uji (菟道皇女) was a Japanese princess and saiō. Her father was Emperor Bidatsu and her mother was his first wife, Hirohime.

== Life ==
Princess Uji was born the daughter of Emperor Bidatsu and Hirohime. In 578, she left to become the saiō. However, she likely never worshipped at Mie Prefecture rather worshipping at Mount Miwa. In 578, the same year as her tenureship began, she was raped by Prince Ikebe (possibly Emperor Yōmei), and was forced to resign. The saiō was meant to remain unmarried and a virgin, and having their virginity taken away could cost a woman the job. For example, after being accused of having sex and getting pregnant, Princess Wakatarashihime was pressured to resign as saiō, however she ultimately killed herself.

== Identity ==
The identity of Princess Uji has been somewhat confused with another daughter of Emperor Bidatsu, and his second wife, Empress Suiko. Emperor Bidatsu had a daughter with Suiko named Uji no Kaitako who went on to marry Prince Shōtoku.
