= Princess Tachibana no Nakatsu =

Tachibana no Nakatsu

Empress consort of Japan
- Tenure: 536–539

Empress dowager of Japan
- Tenure: appointed in 539
- Spouse: Emperor Senka
- Issue: Princess Ishi-hime; Princess Oishi-hime; Princess Kura-no-wakaya-hime; Prince Kamiewa; Unknown child
- House: Imperial House of Japan
- Father: Emperor Ninken

Princess Tachibana no Nakatsu (? – fl. 539) was Empress of Japan as the consort of Emperor Senka. She gave birth to five children. Tachibana no Nakatsu was the daughter of Emperor Ninken and Princess Kasuga no Ōiratsume. She became empress dowager from 539.

== Issue ==
  - Princess Ishi-hime (石姫皇女), married to Emperor Kinmei
  - Princess Oishi-hime (小石姫皇女), married to Emperor Kinmei
  - Princess Kura-no-wakaya-hime (倉稚綾姫皇女), married to Emperor Kinmei
  - Prince Kamiewa (上殖葉皇子)
  - Child (died early, gender unknown)

== Notes ==
Japanese royalty
Preceded by Princess Kasuga no Yamada	Empress consort of Japan; 536–539	Succeeded by Princess Ishi-hime
Preceded by Oshisaka no Ōnakatsuhime	Empress dowager of Japan appointed in 539	Succeeded by Princess Ishi-hime
