= Emperor Ankan =

Emperor of Japan from 531 to 536

Emperor Ankan 安閑天皇
- Great King of Yamato
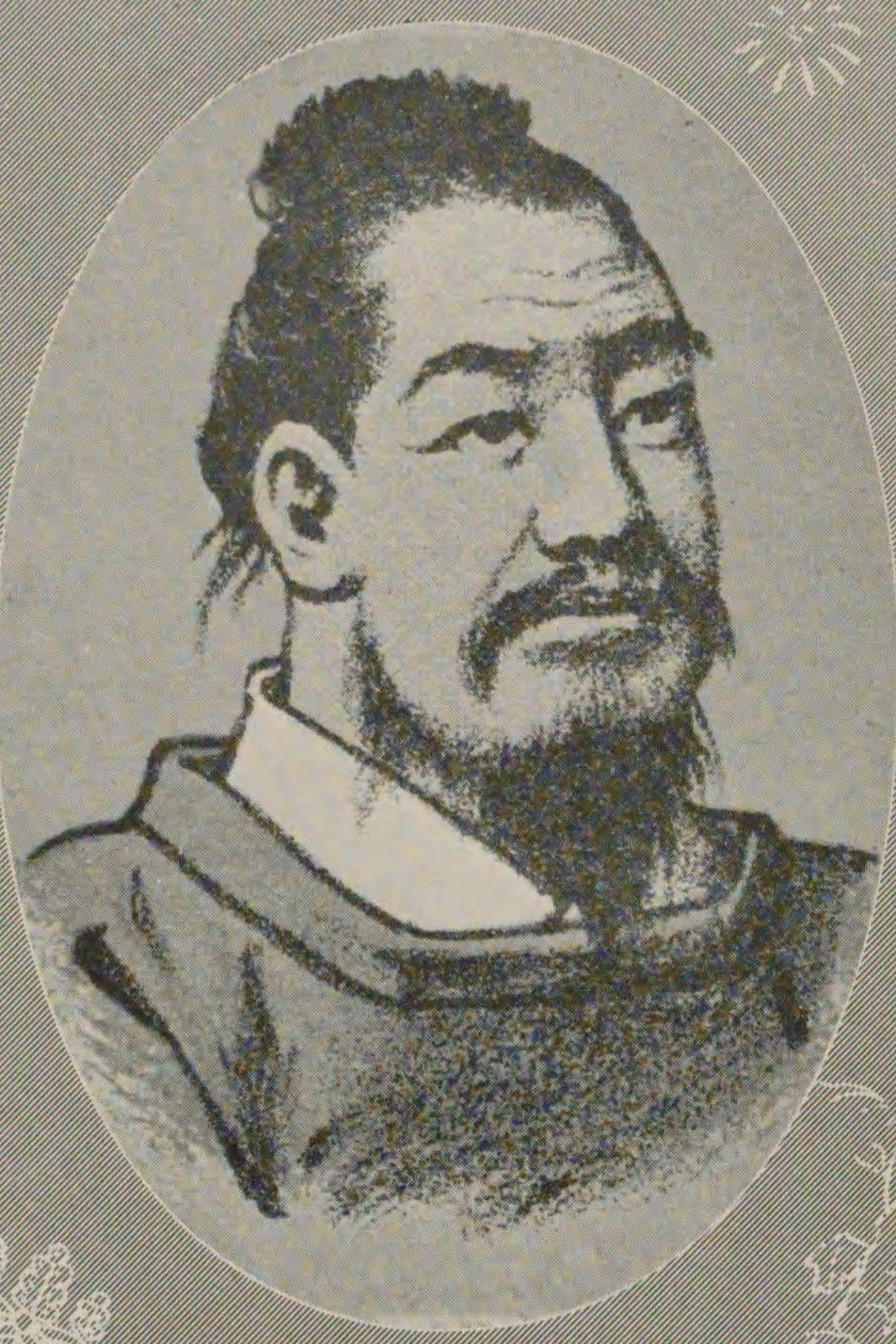
- Emperor Ankan, painted in 1937

Emperor of Japan
- Reign: c. 10 March 531 – 25 January 536
- Predecessor: Keitai
- Successor: Senka
- Born: Magari (勾); 466
- Died: January 25, 536 (aged 69–70)
- Burial: Furuchi no Takaya no oka no misasagi (古市高屋丘陵) (Osaka)
- Spouse: Kasuga no Yamada
- Issue: Imperial Prince Ako; Prince Kibu; Emperor Kinmei
Posthumous name
- Chinese-style shigō: Emperor Ankan (安閑天皇) Japanese-style shigō: Hirokuni-oshitakekanahi no Sumeramikoto (広国押武金日天皇)
- House: Imperial House of Japan
- Father: Emperor Keitai
- Mother: Menokohime

Emperor Ankan (安閑天皇, Ankan-tennō) (466 – 25 January 536) was the 27th Emperor of Japan, according to the traditional order of succession.

No firm dates can be assigned to this Emperor's life or reign, but he is conventionally considered to have reigned from 10 March 531 to 25 January 536.

== Legendary narrative ==
According to the Kojiki, Prince Magari no Ōe (勾大兄皇子), later Emperor Ankan, was the elder son of Emperor Keitai, who is considered to have ruled the country during the early-6th century, though there is a paucity of information about him. When Ankan was 66 years old, Keitai abdicated in favor of him.

Ankan's contemporary title would not have been tennō, as most historians believe this title was not introduced until the reigns of Emperor Tenmu and Empress Jitō. Rather, it was presumably Sumeramikoto or Amenoshita Shiroshimesu Ōkimi (治天下大王), meaning "the great king who rules all under heaven". Alternatively, Ankan might have been referred to as ヤマト大王/大君 or the "Great King of Yamato".

The most noteworthy event recorded during his reign was the construction of state granaries in large numbers throughout Japan, indicating the broad reach of imperial power at the time.

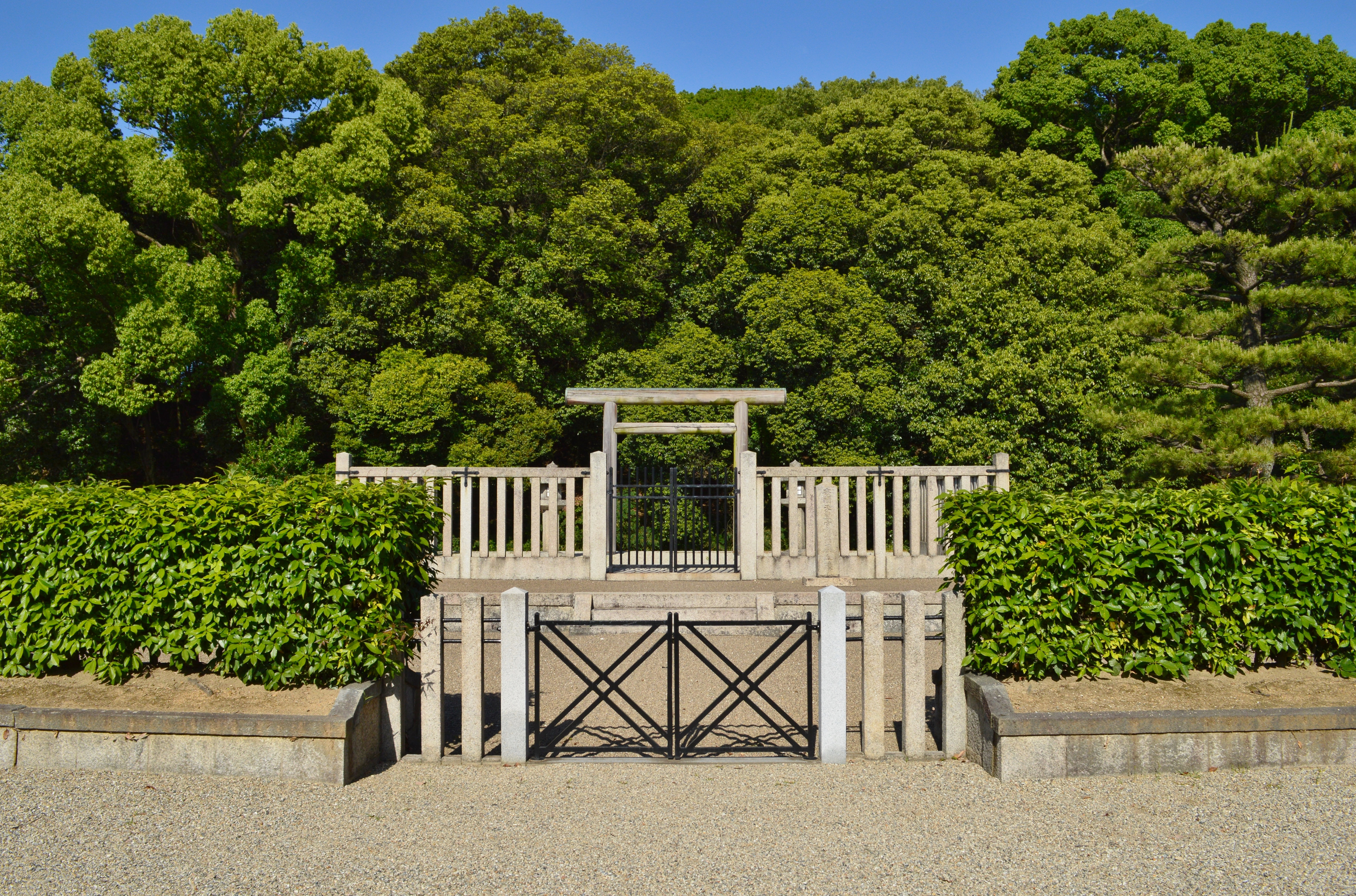
Mausoleum of Emperor Ankan in Habikino, Osaka

Ankan's grave is traditionally associated with the Takayatsukiyama kofun in Habikino, Osaka.

== Genealogy ==
Empress: Princess Kasuga no Yamada (春日山田皇女; d.539), Emperor Ninken's daughter

Consort: Satehime (紗手媛), Kose no Ohito no Ōomi's daughter

Consort: Kakarihime (香香有媛), Kose no Ohito no Ōomi's daughter

Consort: Yakahime (宅媛), Mononobe no Itabi no Ōomuraji's daughter

First son: Imperial Prince Ako.

Second son: Prince Kibu

== See also ==
- Emperor of Japan
- List of Emperors of Japan
- Imperial cult

== Notes ==
Regnal titles
Preceded by Emperor Keitai	Emperor of Japan: Ankan; 531–536 (traditional dates)	Succeeded by Emperor Senka
