= Emperor Bidatsu =

Emperor of Japan from 572 to 585

Emperor Bidatsu 敏達天皇
- Great King of Yamato
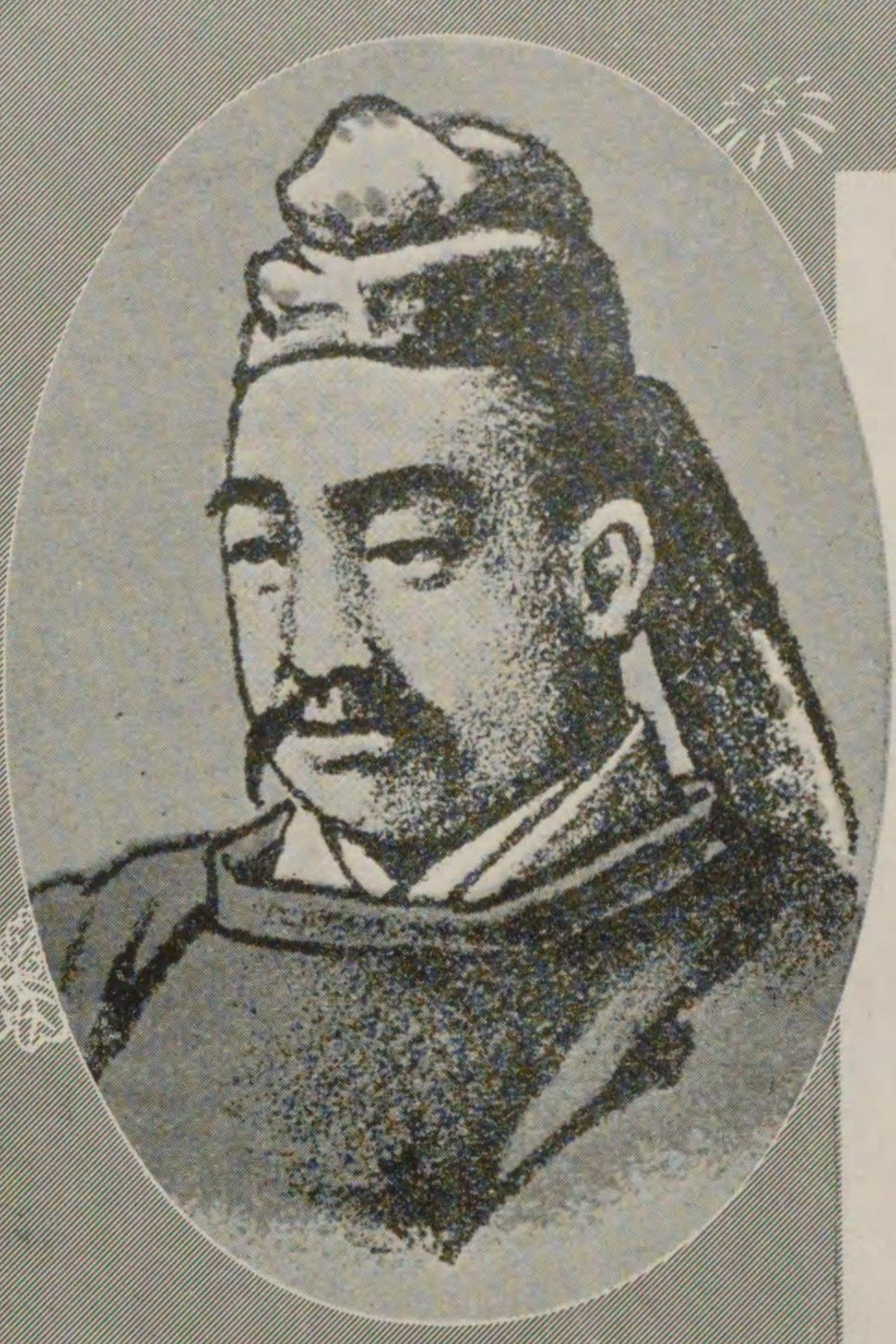

Emperor of Japan
- Reign: 30 April 572 – 14 September 585
- Predecessor: Kinmei
- Successor: Yōmei
- Born: 538
- Died: 14 September 585 (aged 46–47)
- Burial: Kawachi no Shinaga no naka no o no misasagi (河内磯長中尾陵) (Osaka)
- Spouses: Hirohime; Nukatabe (later Empress Suiko)
- Issue: See below
Posthumous name
- Chinese-style shigō: Emperor Bidatsu (敏達天皇) Japanese-style shigō: Nunakuranofutotamashiki no Sumeramikoto (渟中倉太珠敷天皇)
- House: Imperial House of Japan
- Father: Emperor Kinmei
- Mother: Ishi-hime
- Religion: Shinto

Emperor Bidatsu (敏達天皇, Bidatsu-tennō; 538 – 14 September 585) was the 30th emperor of Japan, according to the traditional order of succession.

The traditional regnal years of Bidatsu are 572−585, within Asuka period; however, there are no certain dates for this emperor's life or reign. This is the post-Kofun period of the Yamato Kingship.

The names and sequence of the early emperors were not confirmed as "traditional" until the reign of Emperor Kanmu, who was the 50th monarch of the Imperial House.

== Traditional narrative ==
Historians consider details about the life of Emperor Bidatsu to be possibly legendary, but probable. The name Bidatsu-tennō was created for him posthumously by later generations.

In the Nihon Shoki, he is called Nunakura no Futotamashiki (渟中倉太珠敷).

His palace in Yamato Province was called Osada no Miya of Iware.

== Events of Bidatsu's life ==
According to traditional historiography, in the 15th year of Emperor Kinmei’s reign, Bidatsu was named crown prince. In the 32nd year of Kimmei-tennō's reign (欽明天皇32年; 572), the emperor died, and the succession was received by his second son. Soon after, Emperor Bidatsu is said to have acceded to the throne.

Bidatsu's contemporary title would not have been titled Tennō, as most historians believe this title was not introduced until the reigns of Emperor Tenmu and Empress Jitō. Rather, it was presumably Sumera-mikoto or Ame-no-sita Sirosimesu Opo-kimi (治天下大王, the great ruler of all under heaven). Alternatively, Bidatsu might have been referred to as ヤマト大王/大君 or the "Great King of Yamato".

Bidatsu's reign was marked by power struggles about Buddhism, which had been introduced in his mother's lifetime. The two most important men in the court of Bidatsu were Soga no Umako and Mononobe no Moriya. Soga supported the growth of Buddhism, and Moriya wanted to stop it.

Bidatsu sought to re-establish relations with the Three Kingdoms of Korea, according to Nihon Shoki, his court successfully established relations with two of them, Baekje and Silla.

He died from a disease which afflicted him with sores, apparently the first royal victim of smallpox in Japan.

The actual site of Bidatsu's grave is known. He is traditionally venerated at a Shinto shrine (陵, misasagi) at Osaka. The Imperial Household Agency designates this location as Bidatsu's mausoleum. It is formally named Kawachi no Shinaga no naka no o no misasagi.

== Genealogy ==
He was the second son of Emperor Kinmei. His mother, Ishi-hime, was a daughter of Emperor Senka.

Although he had many children, none of them would ever become Emperor. According to Gukanshō, Bidatsu had four empresses and 16 Imperial children (6 sons and 10 daughters).

Bidatsu's first empress, Hirohime, died in the fifth year of his reign. To replace her, he elevated one of his consorts, Princess Nukatabe, to the rank of empress. Nukatabe was his half-sister by their father Kinmei. Later she ascended to the throne in her own right and is today known as Empress Suiko.

He was succeeded first by one of his brothers, Emperor Yōmei, then by another, Emperor Sushun, and then Empress Suiko, his sister and wife, before his grandson, Emperor Jomei, eventually took the throne.

- Empress: Hirohime (広姫; d.575), Prince Okinaga-no-Mate's daughter
  - First Son: Prince Oshisako no Hikohito no Ōe (押坂彦人大兄皇子; b.556)
  - Princess Sakanobori (逆登皇女)
  - Princess Uji (菟道皇女), Saiō
- Empress: Princess Nukatabe (額田部皇女), later Empress Suiko, Emperor Kinmei's daughter
  - Princess Uji no Kaitako (菟道貝蛸皇女; b.570), married to Prince Shōtoku
  - Prince Takeda (竹田皇子)
  - Princess Oharita (小墾田皇; b.572), married to Prince Oshisako-no-Hikohito-no-Ōe
  - Princess Umori (鸕鶿守皇女)
  - Prince Kazuraki (葛城王)
  - Prince Owari (尾張皇子), father of Tachibana-no-Oiratsume (Prince Shōtoku's consort)
  - Princess Tame (田眼皇女), married to Emperor Jomei
  - Princess Sakurai no Yumihari (桜井弓張皇女), married to Prince Oshisako-no-Hikohito-no-Ōe, later married to Prince Kume (Emperor Yomei's son)
- Consort: Kasuga-no-Ominako-no-Iratsume (春日老女子), Kasuga no Nakakimi no Omi's daughter
  - Prince Naniwa (難波皇子; 560-587)
  - Prince Kasuga (春日皇子; 560-615)
  - Princess Kuwata (桑田皇女)
  - Third Son: Prince Ohomata (大派皇子; b.585)
- Concubine: Unako no Otoshi (菟名子), Ohoka no Obito no Okuma's daughter
  - Princess Futohime (太姫), also 桜井皇女
  - Princess Nukatehime (糠手姫皇女; 570-664), married to Prince Oshisako no Hikohito no Ōe

== See also ==
- Emperor of Japan
- List of emperors of Japan
- Imperial cult

== Notes ==
Regnal titles
Preceded by Emperor Kinmei	Emperor of Japan: Bidatsu; 572–585	Succeeded by Emperor Yōmei
