= Hirohime =

Empress consort of Japan
- Tenure: 572–575
- Died: 575
- Spouse: Emperor Bidatsu
- Issue: Prince Oshisako no Hikohito no Ōe; Princess Sakanobori; Princess Uji
- House: Imperial House of Japan
- Father: Prince Okinaga-no-Mate

Hirohime (died 575) was Empress of Japan as the consort of Emperor Bidatsu.

Hirohime was Prince Okinaga-no-Mate's daughter. Hirohime and Bidatsu's had a son, Prince Oshisaka Hikohito, who then had his own son, Prince Tamura, who became the Emperor Jomei.

== Issue ==
  - First Son: Prince Oshisako no Hikohito no Ōe (押坂彦人大兄皇子; b.556)
  - Princess Sakanobori (逆登皇女)
  - Princess Uji (菟道皇女), Saiō

== Notes ==
Japanese royalty
Preceded by Princess Ishi-hime	Empress consort of Japan; 572–575	Succeeded by Princess Nukatabe
