= Emperor Keitai =

Emperor of Japan from 507 to 531

Emperor Keitai 継体天皇
- Great King of Yamato
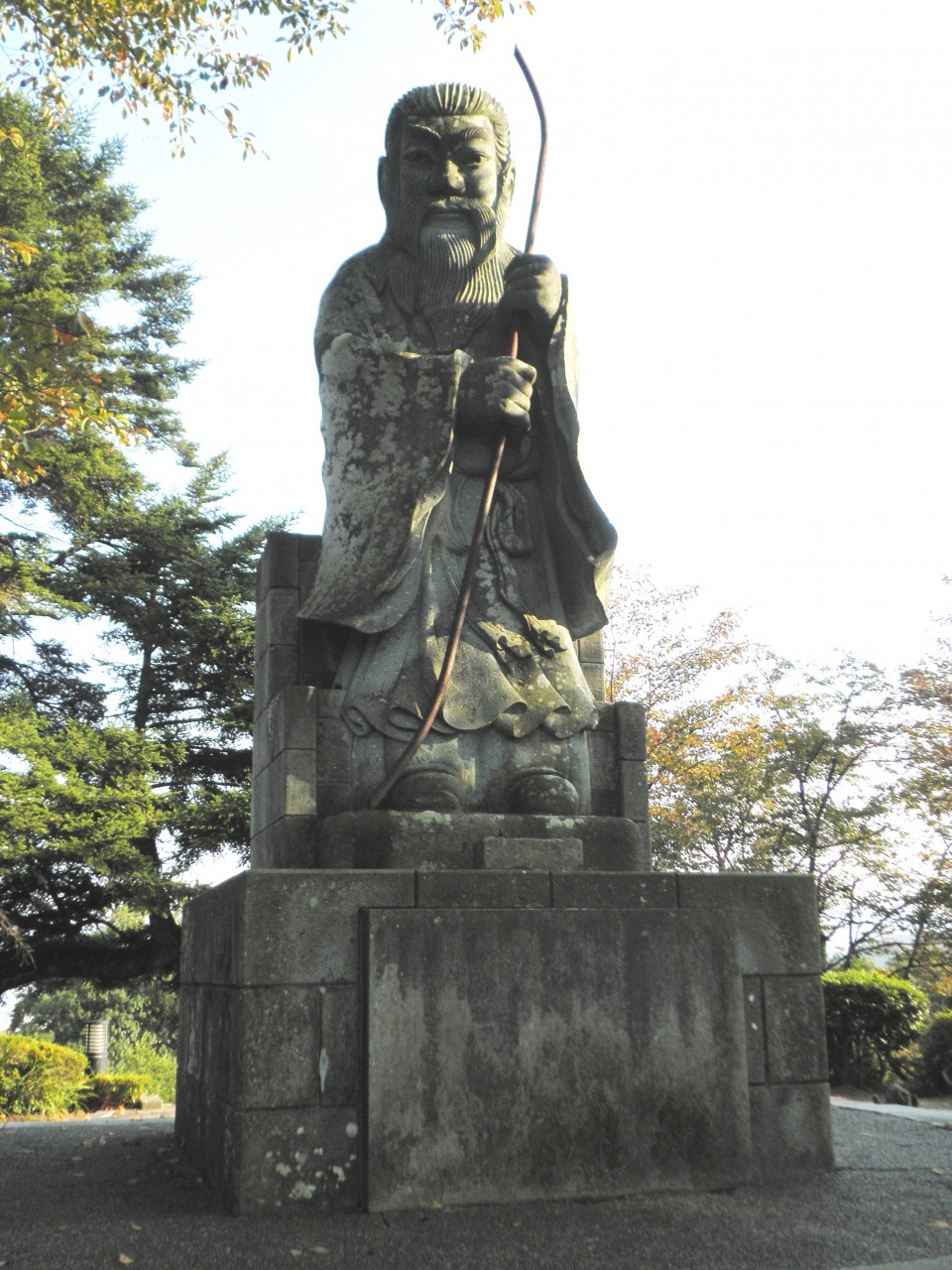
- Statue of Keitai in Mount Asuwa, Fukui Prefecture, Japan

Emperor of Japan
- Reign: 3 March 507 – 10 March 531
- Predecessor: Buretsu
- Successor: Ankan
- Born: 450
- Died: March 10, 531 (aged 80–81)
- Burial: Mishima no Akinu no misasagi (三島藍野陵) (Osaka)
- Spouse: Tashiraka
- Issue among others...: Emperor Kinmei; Emperor Ankan; Emperor Senka
Posthumous name
- Chinese-style shigō: Emperor Keitai (継体天皇) Japanese-style shigō: Ohodo no Sumeramikoto (雄大迹天皇)
- House: Imperial House of Japan
- Father: Hikoushi no Ōkimi
- Mother: Furihime

Emperor Keitai (継体天皇, Keitai-tennō) (died 10 March 531) was the 26th emperor of Japan, according to the traditional order of succession.

No firm dates can be assigned to this emperor's life or reign, but he is conventionally considered to have reigned from 3 March 507 to 10 March 531.

== Legendary narrative ==
Keitai is considered to have ruled the country during the early 6th century, but there is a paucity of information about him. There is insufficient material available for further verification and study. Significant differences exist in the records of the Kojiki and the Nihon Shoki.

The Kojiki puts this emperor's birth year at 485; and his date of death is said to have been April 9, 527. In the extant account, he is called Ohodo (袁本杼).

The Nihon Shoki gives his birth year at 450; and he is said to have died on February 7, 531 or 534. In this historical record, he is said to have been called Ohodo (男大迹) and Hikofuto (彦太).

In other historical records, he is said to have originally been King of Koshi, a smaller tribal entity, apparently in northern parts of central Japan, perhaps as far as the coast of Sea of Japan. Some modern reference works of history call Keitai simply King Ohodo of Koshi.

Keitai's contemporary title would not have been tennō, as most historians believe this title was not introduced until the reigns of Emperor Tenmu and Empress Jitō. Rather, it was presumably Sumeramikoto or Amenoshita Shiroshimesu Ōkimi (治天下大王), meaning "the great king who rules all under heaven". Alternatively, Keitai might have been referred to as ヤマト大王/大君 or the "Great King of Yamato".

=== Genealogy ===
Keitai was not the son of the immediate previous monarch. According to the Kojiki and Nihon Shoki, Buretsu died without a successor, at which time a fifth generation grandson of Emperor Ōjin, Keitai, came and ascended the throne.

If Emperor Keitai began a new dynasty as some historians believe, then Emperor Buretsu would have been the last monarch of the first recorded dynasty of Japan.

According to the Kojiki and Nihon Shoki, his father was Hikoushi no Ō/Hikoushi no Ōkimi (彦主人王) and his mother was Furihime (振媛). When Buretsu died, Kanamura recommended Keitai (at the age of 58) as a possible heir to the Chrysanthemum Throne. His mother, Furihime, was a seventh generation descendant of Emperor Suinin by his son, Prince Iwatsukuwake. His father was a fourth generation descendant of Emperor Ōjin by his son, Prince Wakanuke no Futamata.

Genealogy information is supplemented in Shaku Nihongi which quotes from the now lost text Jōgūki (7th century). It says he was a son of Ushi no Ōkimi (believed to be equivalent to Hikoushi no Ōkimi), a grandson of Ohi no Ōkimi, a great-grandson of Ohohoto no Ōkimi (brother to Emperor Ingyō's consort), a great-great-grandson of Prince Wakanuke no Futamata, and a great-great-great-grandson of Emperor Ōjin.

The genealogical trees of the Nihon Shoki have been lost, and the accuracy of its account of events remains unknown. This uncertainty raises arguable doubts about this emperor's genealogy.

Although genealogical information in the Shaku Nihongi leaves room for discussion, many scholars acknowledge the blood relationship with the Okinaga clan, a powerful local ruling family or the collateral line of the Imperial family-governed Ōmi region (a part of present-day Shiga Prefecture). This family produced many empresses and consorts throughout history. According to the Nihon Shoki, Ohohoto no Ōkimi, the great-grandfather of Emperor Keitai, married into the Okinaga clan. Keitai's mother, Furihime, was from a local ruling family in Koshi (Echizen Province), so his mother brought him to her home after his father's death. Abundant traditions relating to the family have been passed down by shrines and old-established families in both regions.

Regardless of speculation about Keitai's genealogy, it is well settled that there was an extended period of disputes over the succession which developed after Keitai's death. A confrontation arose between adherents of two branches of the Yamato, pitting the supporters of sons who would become known as Emperor Ankan and Emperor Senka against those who were backers of the son who would become known as Emperor Kinmei.

== Keitai's reign ==
Keitai declared his ascension in Kuzuha, in the northern part of Kawachi Province (present day Hirakata, Osaka), and married a younger sister of Emperor Buretsu, Princess Tashiraka. It is supposed that his succession was not welcomed by everyone, and it took about 20 years for Keitai to enter Yamato Province, near Kawachi and the political center of Japan at the time.

In Keitai's later years, 527 or 528, the Iwai Rebellion broke out in Tsukushi province, Kyūshū. Keitai assigned Mononobe no Arakabi as Shōgun and sent him to Kyūshū to put down the rebellion.

Among his sons, Emperor Ankan, Emperor Senka and Emperor Kinmei ascended to the throne.

The actual site of Keitai's grave is not known. He is traditionally venerated at a memorial Shinto shrine (misasagi) at the Ooda Chausuyama kofun in Ibaraki, Osaka.

The Imperial Household Agency designates this location as Keitai's mausoleum. It is formally named Mishima no Aikinu no misasagi.

== Consorts and children ==
Empress: Princess Tashiraka (手白香皇女; b. 489), Emperor Ninken's daughter

- Prince Amekunioshiharakihironiwa (天国排開広庭尊), later Emperor Kinmei

Consort: Menokohime (目子媛), Owari no Muraji Kusaka's daughter

- First Son: Prince Magari no Ōe (勾大兄皇子), later Emperor Ankan
- Second son: Prince Hinokuma no Takata (檜隈高田皇子), later Emperor Senka

Consort: Wakakohime (稚子媛), Mio no Tsunoori no Kimi's younger sister

- Prince Ōiratsuko (大郎皇子)
- Princess Izumo (出雲皇女)

Consort: Hirohime (広媛), Prince Sakata no Ōmata's daughter

- Princess Kamusaki (神前皇女)
- Princess Manta (茨田皇女)
- Princess Umaguta (馬来田皇女)

Consort: Ominoiratsume (麻績娘子), daughter of Okinaga no Mate (息長真手王)

- Princess Sasage (荳角皇女), Saiō

Consort: Sekihime (関媛), daughter of Manda no Muraji Omochi (茨田連小望)

- Princess Manda no Ōiratsume (茨田大娘皇女)
- Princess Shirasaka no Ikuhihime (白坂活日姫皇女)
- Princess Ono no Wakairatsume (小野稚娘皇女)

Consort: Yamatohime (倭媛), daughter of Mio no Kimi Katahi (三尾君堅楲)

- Princess Ōiratsume (大郎子皇女)
- Prince Maroko (椀子皇子)
- Prince Mimi (耳皇子)
- Princess Akahime (赤姫皇女)

Consort: Haehime (荑媛), daughter of Wani no Omi Kawachi (和珥臣河内)

- Princess Wakayahime (稚綾姫皇女)
- Princess Tubira no Iratsuko (円娘皇女)
- Prince Atsu (厚皇子)

Consort: Hirohime (広媛), daughter of Ne (根王)

- Prince Usagi (菟皇子)
- Prince Nakatsu (中皇子)

== See also ==
- The civil war of the Keitai and Kinmei dynasties
- Emperor of Japan
- List of Emperors of Japan
- Imperial cult

== Notes ==
Regnal titles
Preceded by Emperor Buretsu	Emperor of Japan: Keitai; 3 March 507 – 10 March 531 (traditional dates)	Succeeded by Emperor Ankan
