= Kasuga no Iratsume =

Empress consort of Japan
- Tenure: 499–507
- Spouse: Emperor Buretsu
- House: Imperial House of Japan

Kasuga no Iratsume (? – fl. 507) was Empress of Japan as the consort of Emperor Buretsu.

She is the only Japanese empress consort whose parents are unknown.

It is recorded that she and the emperor had no children.

== Notes ==
Japanese royalty
Preceded by Princess Kasuga no Ōiratsume	Empress consort of Japan; 499–507	Succeeded by Princess Tashiraka
