= Suishō =

Suishō (帥升, ca. AD 107) was a king of Wa (Japan). He is the earliest Japanese person whose name appeared in a Chinese history. He is mentioned in Volume 85 of the Book of the Later Han, which was compiled in 445 C.E. Although Suishō is the earliest figure in Japanese history to be named in a text, he was not the first. Himiko, a shaman queen of Wa, lived over a century after Suishō, but was mentioned in a Chinese text written in 289 C.E., about 150 years before the text mentioning Suishō was written.

== Historical references ==
The only historical record about Suishō is a brief sentence on Volume 85 of the Book of the Later Han.

In the first year of Yongchu during the reign of the Emperor An (AD 107), Suishō, the king of Wa, presented 160 生口 (slaves?) [to the emperor], and entreated an audience.
