= Emperor Buretsu =

Emperor of Japan from 499 to 507

Emperor Buretsu 武烈天皇
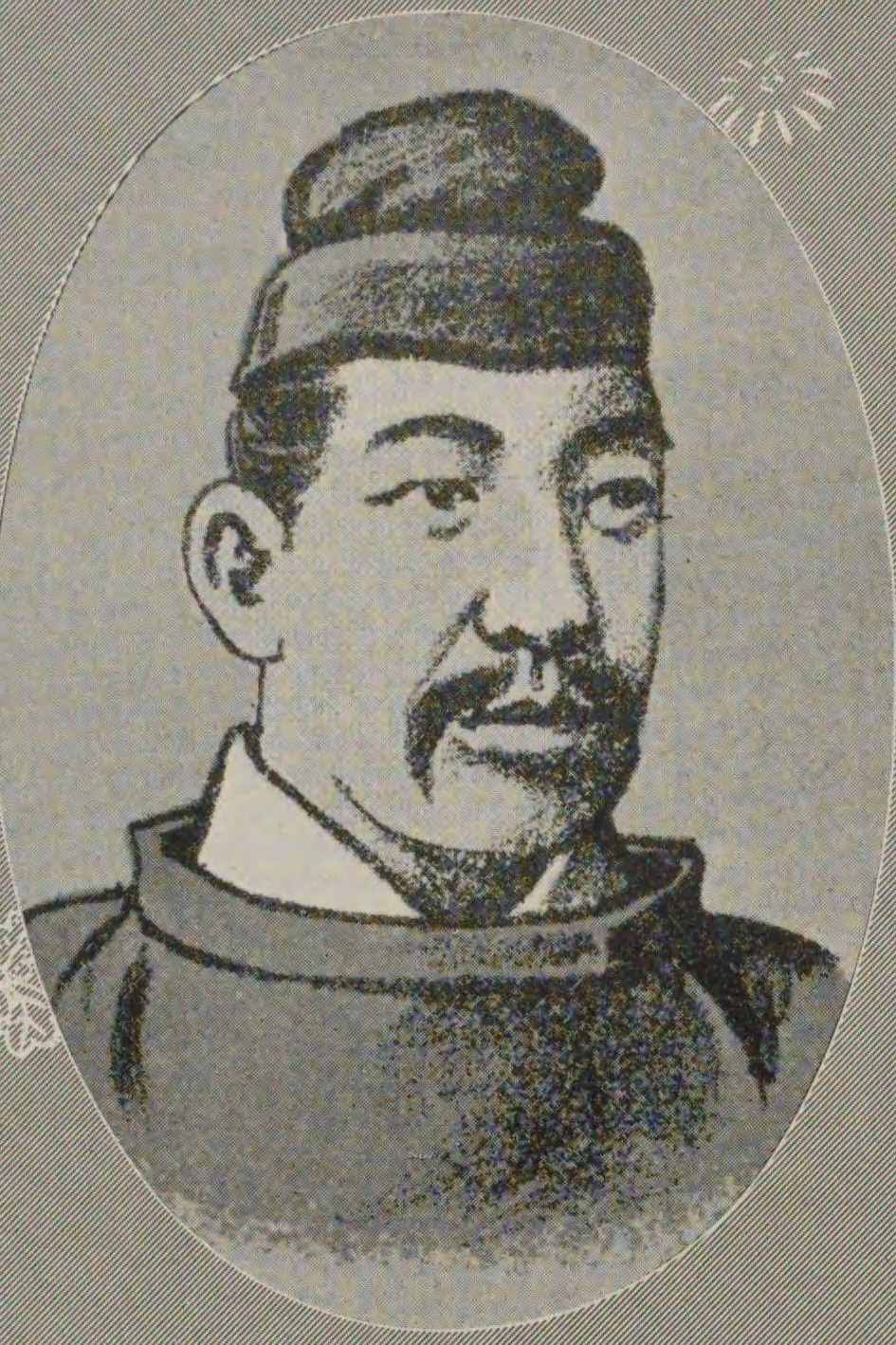
- Emperor Buretsu, painted in 1937

Emperor of Japan
- Reign: 12 January 499 – 7 January 507
- Predecessor: Ninken
- Successor: Keitai
- Born: 489
- Died: January 7, 507 (aged 17–18)
- Burial: Kataoka no Iwatsuki no oka no kita no misasagi (傍丘磐坏丘北陵) (Nara)
- Spouse: Kasuga no Iratsume
Posthumous name
- Chinese-style shigō: Emperor Buretsu (武烈天皇) Japanese-style shigō: Ohatsusenowakasazaki no Sumeramikoto (小泊瀬稚鷦鷯天皇)
- House: Imperial House of Japan
- Father: Emperor Ninken
- Mother: Kasuga no Ōiratsume

Emperor Buretsu (武烈天皇, Buretsu-tennō) (489 – 7 January 507) was the 25th legendary Emperor of Japan, according to the traditional order of succession.

No firm dates can be assigned to this Emperor's life or reign, but he is conventionally considered to have reigned from 12 January 499 to 7 January 507.

== Legendary narrative ==
Buretsu is considered to have ruled the country during the late-fifth century and early-sixth century, but there is a paucity of information about him. There is insufficient material available for further verification and study.

Buretsu was a son of Emperor Ninken and his mother is Empress Kasuga no Ōiratsume (春日大娘皇女). His name was Ohatsuse no Wakasazaki (小泊瀬稚鷦鷯). He had no children.

== Buretsu's reign ==
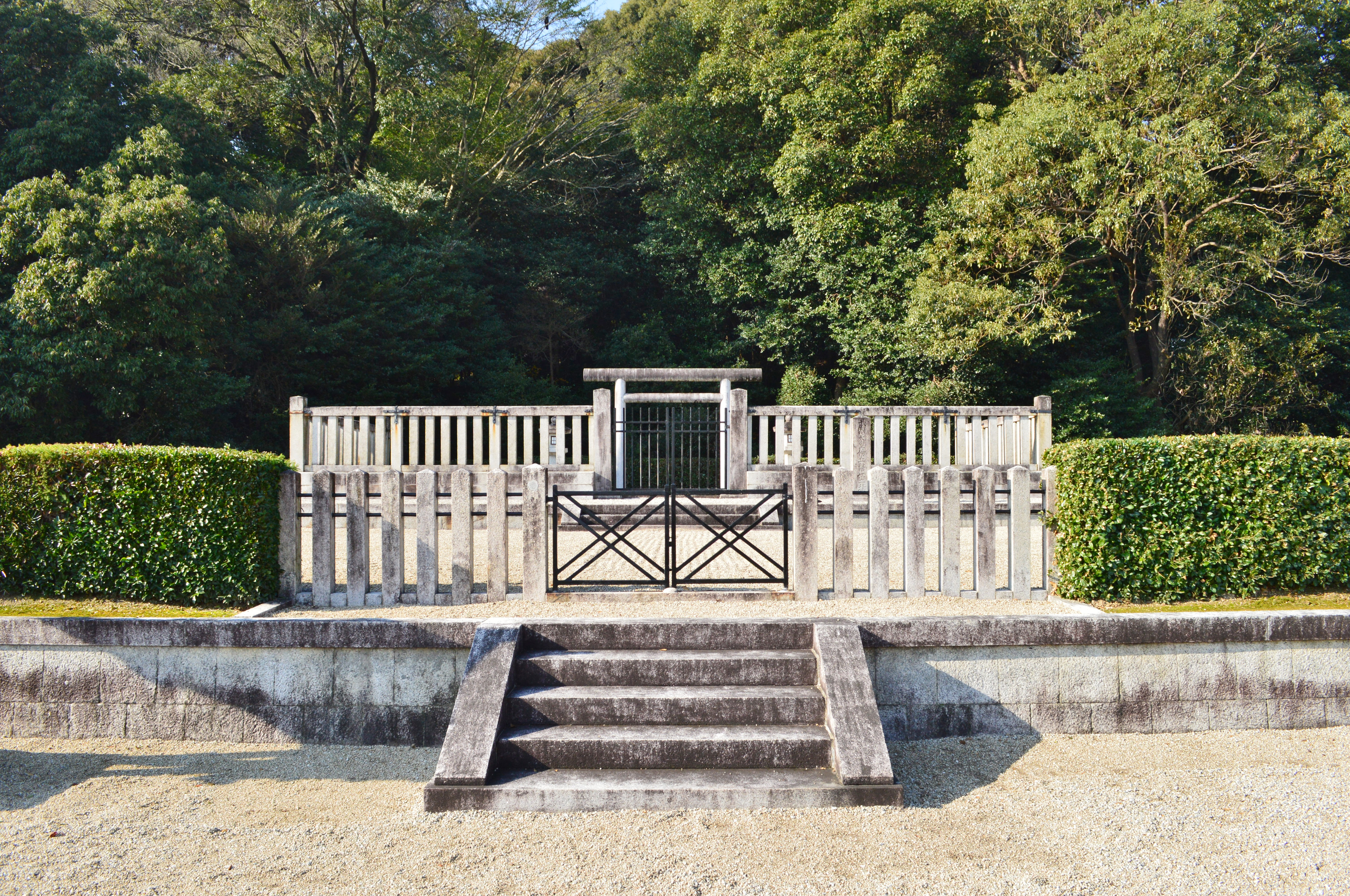
Mausoleum of Emperor Buretsu in Kashiba, Nara

Buretsu's contemporary title would not have been tennō, as most historians believe this title was not introduced until the reigns of Emperor Tenmu and Empress Jitō. Rather, it was presumably Sumeramikoto or Amenoshita Shiroshimesu Ōkimi (治天下大王), meaning "the great king who rules all under heaven". Alternatively, Buretsu might have been referred to as ヤマト大王/大君 or the "Great King of Yamato".

Buretsu is described as an extremely wicked historical figure. The Nihonshoki describes the 11-year-old Buretsu, in 500, cutting open the stomach of a pregnant woman and observing the embryo. In addition to his acts of personal cruelty, during his reign the general welfare of the nation declined severely. According to the Tenshō, supposedly compiled by Fujiwara no Hamanari, Buretsu was admonished by Ōtomo no Kanamura. Nihonshoki likened his debauchery to Di Xin of the Shang dynasty, but the record in Kojiki has no such indication. There are several theories on this difference. Some believe that this was to justify and praise his successor Emperor Keitai, who took over under questionable circumstances, not having been in a position of immediate succession. In history textbooks available before and during World War II, the negative parts of Buretsu's record were intentionally omitted.

If Emperor Keitai began a new dynasty as some historians believe, then Buretsu is the last Emperor of the first recorded dynasty of Japan.

The actual site of Buretsu's grave is not known. The Emperor is traditionally venerated at a memorial Shinto shrine (misasagi) at Nara.

The Imperial Household Agency designates this location as Buretsu's mausoleum. It is formally named Kataoka no Iwatsuki no oka no kita no misasagi.

== Consorts and children ==
- Empress: Kasuga no Iratsume (春日娘子)
  - Children: None

== See also ==
- Emperor of Japan
- List of Emperors of Japan
- Imperial cult
- Prince Junda, dispatched to Japan after a Korean emissary was taken hostage at Buretsu's initiative

== Notes ==
Regnal titles
Preceded by Emperor Ninken	Emperor of Japan: Buretsu; 12 January 499 – 7 January 507 (traditional dates)	Succeeded by Emperor Keitai
