= Okimi =

Japanese rulers' title

Ōkimi (大王, also read as Daiō), or Ame no shita Shiroshimesu Ōkimi (治天下大王, Chi Tenka Daiō), was the title of the head of the Yamato Kingship, or the monarch title of Wakoku (Old Japan). This term was used from the Kofun period through the Asuka period in ancient Japan.

== Etymology ==
The title 大王 (Ōkimi or Daiō), which is an honorific title for the head (king) of the Yamato Kingship, was established around the 5th century and was used until the 680s. It was established when the compilation of the Asuka Kiyomihara Code started. There are several theories upon whether the title holder in the early period is a king of the unified kingship or not. Ōkimi in Japanese reading is created by adding the prefix ō or oho which indicates greatness and particular nobleness, to the title "kimi" (lord), which indicates a master or nobleman. Another theory states that Ōkimi is only an honorific form of kimi, a title with Japanese origins, while Daiō is based on a king title which originated from China; the title of kango (Chinese word). There are several instances of the use of Ōkimi, which is understood as a courtesy title of Emperor or royal family.

== Title of King of Japan in Chinese documents ==
=== King as a title in ancient China ===
The kanji title "王" (Ō, Wang) originally designated a Master of Chūgen (中原, Zhongyuan) in Inner China. In the Zhou dynasty period, 王 (Wang) was the title of the sole Son of Heaven who rules the Tianxia. However, some great powers in the region of the Yangtze civilization did not want to stand in subordinate positions of the nations of the Yellow River civilization in North China, such as Chu, Wu and Yue. Some of their monarchs titled themselves Wang.

When China entered into the Warring States period, the monarchs of the great nations among the states of North China who were originally subjects of the Zhou King, but achieved territorial statehood, called themselves sole Wang of the Tianxia in place of the Zhou King. Thus, there were numerous claims to the throne in mainland China. Thereafter, Ying Zheng (嬴政), the King of Qin (Emperor Shi Huang), who unified China for the first time in 221 BC, adopted the title "Emperor" (皇帝, Huángdì) instead of title "King", which had been degraded. The King title Wang became the title granted to subjects of the Emperor, or that assigned to heads of neighboring states who recognized the authority of the Qin Emperor as Master of Tianxia, with a connotation of a subordinate rank. The latter usage was established thereafter. The monarch of Xiongnu stood on even ground with the Emperor of Qin, therefore his title was Chanyu, not Wang.

=== Early title of King of Japan ===
The first appearance of King title related to old Japan is 漢委奴国王 (Kan no Wa no Na no kokuō, King of Na in Wa of Han) engraved on the gold seal which was bestowed on the king of Nakoku by the emperor Guangwu of Han in 57 AD.

The word Wakoku ō (King of Wa) appears in the article dated to the first year of Eisho (107 AD), in the record of Emperor An in the Book of the Later Han. The full title, as written in the record of emperor An, is: "Suishō, the king of Wa, and other". If "Wakoku ō" refers to the King of Wakoku as a head of the states union, other than a head of small regional state, this description shows the establishment of the Wakoku.

In addition, Himiko (c. 180 AD–c. 247 AD) was authorised as the unified Queen of Wakoku (whose capital was Yamatai koku) by the Wei dynasty. There is a theory that the government that existed during Himiko's rule was an early form of the Yamato Kingship, though this has been disputed.

== Establishment of the Daiō (Great King) expression ==
The kanji letters of the title 大王 (ōkimi, great king) was first appeared in the inscription of the iron sword unearthed from Inariyama kofun, Saitama prefecture.

On the other hand, on the iron sword which is a silver inlaid sword, unearthed from the Eta Funayama kofun, Kumamoto prefecture, there was the inscription. It was difficult to read this inscription. In 1934, Toshio Fukuyama deciphered the inscription and he read it partially as 「治天下𤟱□□□歯大王世□□」. From this reading, Fukuyama identified that Daiō (大王) in this script is the Emperor Hansho. But in 1978, on the iron sword, unearthed from Inariyama kofun, Saitama prefecture, the inscription was discovered. When Toshio Kishi and other researchers tried to decipher this inscription, they re-examined the reading of the script on the sword from the Eta Funayama kofun. They found the script can be read as 「治天下獲加多支鹵大王」. 「獲加多支鹵」 is read "Wakatakeru", and it is the Japanese name of the Emperor Yuryaku. This daiō inscribed on the sword might be Yuryaku, and this is the first used example of Chi Tenka Daiō, in the late 5th century.

In Nihon Shoki, compiled in the Nara period, there are the scripts "大王、風姿…" (Daiō, fūshi...) in the first Enthronement record of Ohosazaki no Sumeramikoto (Emperor Nintoku), but it is not certain that this Daiō had been used from the days of Emperor Nintoku, who ruled some 200 years before the compilation of the Nihon Shoki. However, the expression of Daiō appears in the Ōjin record, and after that, it appears in the Ingyō record, Yūryaku record, Kenzō record and Keitai record, among others.

There is the inscription 「癸未年八月日十 大王年 男弟王 在意紫沙加宮時 斯麻 念長寿 遣開中費直穢人今州利二人等取白上同二百旱 作此鏡」 (according to Toshio Fukuyama) on the Suda Hachiman Shrine Mirror (Portrait of person Mirror), owned by Suda Hachiman Shrine, Wakayama prefecture, in which the words 大王 and 男弟王 appear. From this inscription, in the year Mizunoto Hitsuji (癸未, Kibi) when the mirror was made, the title Daiō is supposed to have been used. But there are various interpretations of what year this Mizunoto Hitsuji year was. In several theories, it is: 383, 443, 503, or 623 AD. Among these years, 443 (Emperor Ingyō) or 503 (Emperor Buretsu) are considered most likely. If it is 443, the expression Daiō was used in around the age of Ingyō, in the middle 5th century. However, the characters in the inscription are difficult to interpret. In addition, the content of the inscription itself has various interpretations. The exact years when the expression Daiō started to be used are unclear.

== See also ==
- Suishō
- Emperor of Japan
- Kofun period
- Asuka period
- Five kings of Wa
