= Emperor Senka =

Emperor of Japan from 536 to 539

Emperor Senka 宣化天皇
- Great King of Yamato
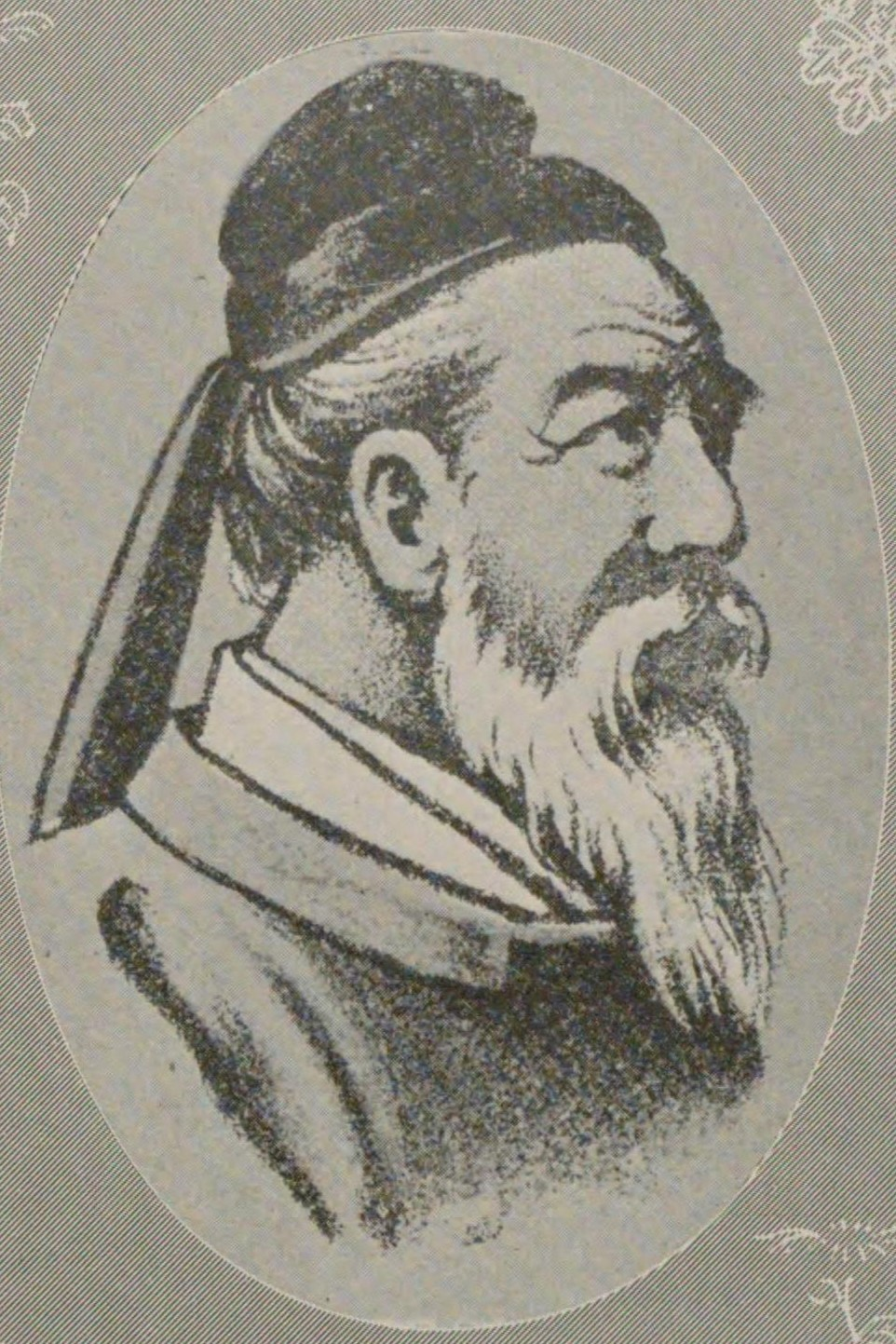
- Emperor Senka

Emperor of Japan
- Reign: 25 January 536 – 15 March 539
- Predecessor: Ankan
- Successor: Kinmei
- Born: Hinokuma-no-takata (檜隈高田); 466
- Died: March 15, 539 (aged 72–73)
- Burial: Musa no Tsukisaka no e no misasagi (身狭桃花鳥坂上陵) (Nara)
- Spouse: Tachibana no Nakatsu
- Issue: See below
Posthumous name
- Chinese-style shigō: Emperor Senka (宣化天皇) Japanese-style shigō: Takewohirokunioshitate no Sumeramikoto (武小広国押盾天皇)
- House: Imperial House of Japan
- Father: Emperor Keitai
- Mother: Menokohime

Emperor Senka (宣化天皇, Senka-tennō) (466 — 15 March 539) was the 28th legendary emperor of Japan, according to the traditional order of succession.

No firm dates can be assigned to this emperor's life or reign, but he is conventionally considered to have reigned from 25 January 536 to 15 March 539, the end of the Kofun period, which was followed by the Asuka period.

== Legendary narrative ==
Senka is considered to have ruled the country during the early-6th century, but there is a paucity of information about him. There is insufficient material available for further verification and study.

When Emperor Ankan died, he had no offspring; and succession passed to his youngest brother Prince Hinokuma no Takata (檜隈高田皇子), who will come to be known as Emperor Senka. Emperor Senka was elderly at the time of his enthronement; and his reign is said to have endured for only three years.

Senka's contemporary title would not have been tennō, as most historians believe this title was not introduced until the reigns of Emperor Tenmu and Empress Jitō. Rather, it was presumably Sumeramikoto or Amenoshita Shiroshimesu Ōkimi (治天下大王), meaning "the great king who rules all under heaven". Alternatively, Senka might have been referred to as ヤマト大王/大君 or the "Great King of Yamato".

During this reign, Soga no Iname is believed to have been the first verifiable Omi (also Ōomi, "Great Minister").

The Emperor is traditionally venerated at a memorial Shinto shrine (misasagi) at Nara. The Imperial Household Agency designates this location as Senka's mausoleum. It is formally named Musa no Tsukisaka no e no misasagi; however, the actual sites of the graves of the early Emperors remain problematic, according to some historians and archaeologists.

== Genealogy ==
- Empress: Princess Tachibana no Nakatsu (橘仲皇女), Emperor Ninken's daughter
  - Princess Ishi-hime (石姫皇女), married to Emperor Kinmei
  - Princess Oishi-hime (小石姫皇女), married to Emperor Kinmei
  - Princess Kura-no-wakaya-hime (倉稚綾姫皇女), married to Emperor Kinmei
  - Prince Kamiewa (上殖葉皇子)
  - Child (died early, gender unknown)
- Consort: Ōkouchi-wakako-hime (大河内稚子媛)
  - Prince Honoo (火焔皇子)
- Mother unknown
  - Princess Hikage (日影皇女), married to Emperor Kinmei
  - Prince Yakabe (宅部皇子; d. 587), speculated as Emperor Kinmei's son

== See also ==
- Emperor of Japan
- List of Emperors of Japan
- Imperial cult

== Notes ==
Regnal titles
Preceded by Emperor Ankan	Emperor of Japan: Senka; 536–539	Succeeded by Emperor Kinmei
