= Ōtomo no Satehiko =

Ōtomo no Satehiko 大伴 狭手彦
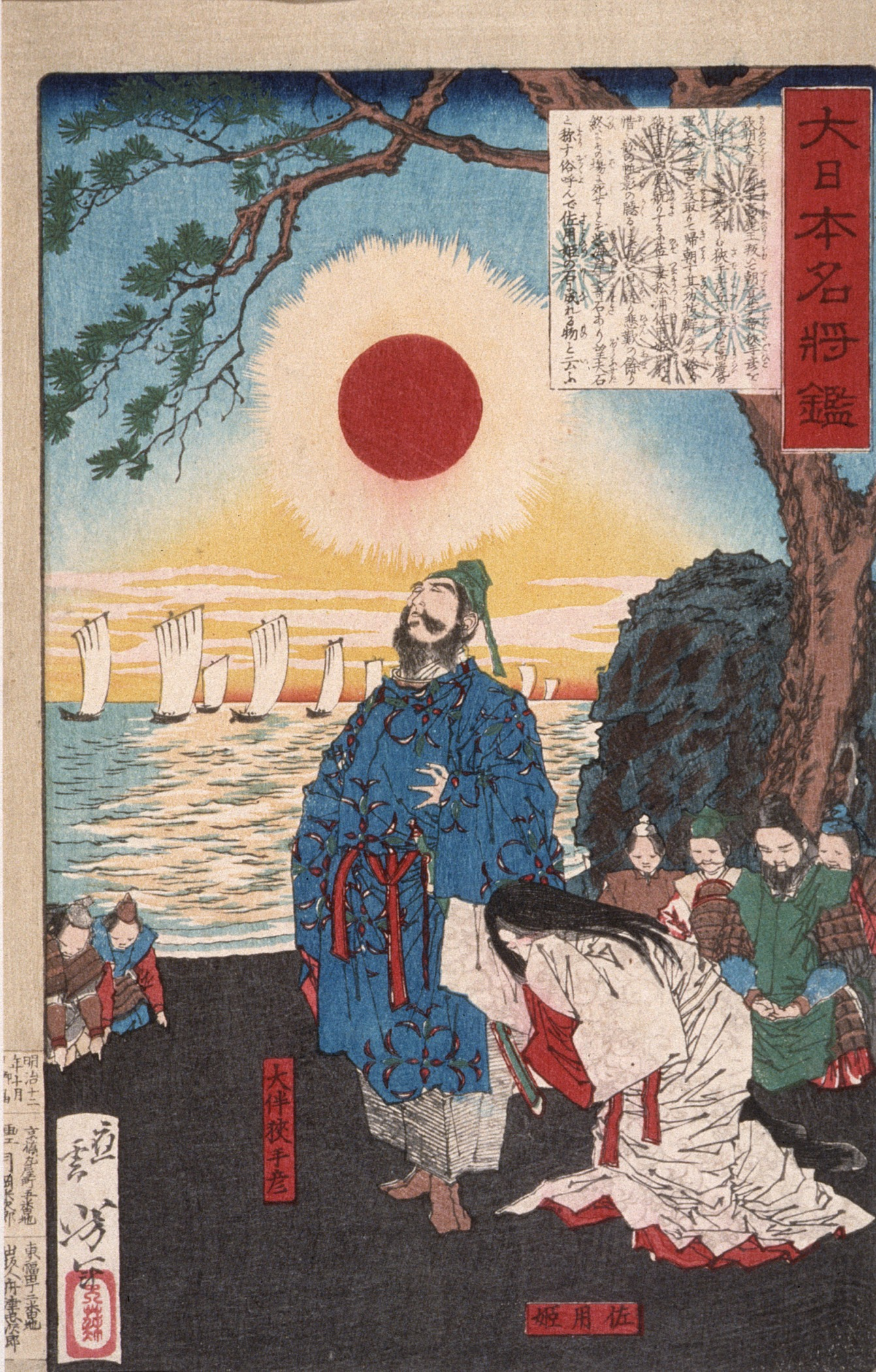
- Ōtomo no Satehiko and Matsura Sayohime
- Lord(s): Emperor Senka (until 539); Emperor Kinmei (after 539)
Era dates
- late Kofun period
- Clan: Ōtomo
- Father: Ōtomo no Kanamura

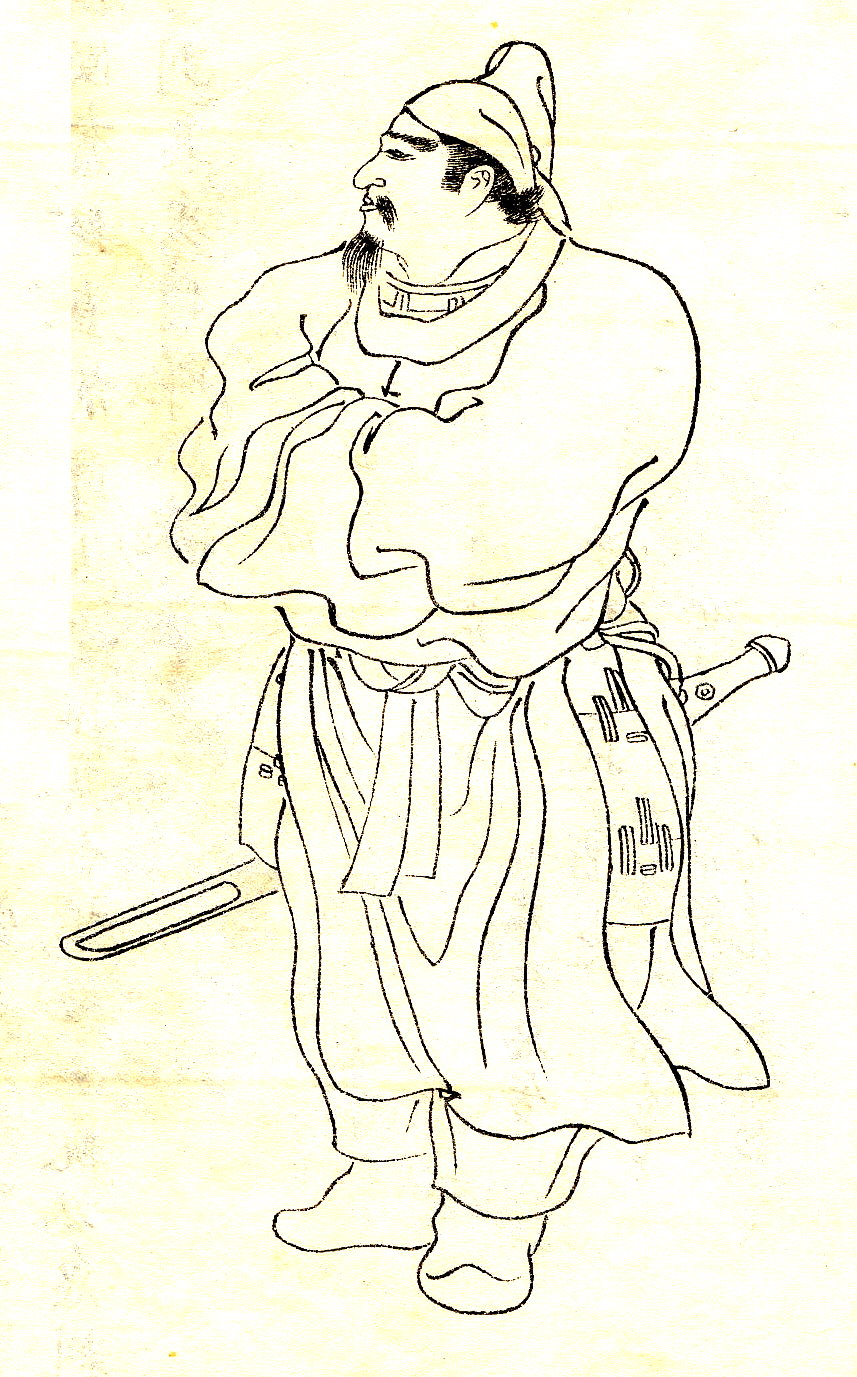
Ōtomo no Satehiko, drawn by Kikuchi Yōsai

Ōtomo no Satehiko (大伴挾手彦) was a Japanese general.

Sadehiko was the son of Ōtomo no Kanamura. He twice led forces against the Korean kingdom of Goguryeo, first in 537 CE (some sources claim 536) and later in 562. A legend regarding his first campaign tells of how his wife, Matsura Sayohime, climbed to the hills above Hizen and prayed with such intensity for his safe return that she was turned into stone.
