= Matsuoka Kofun Cluster =

Burial site in Japan

Matsuoka Kofun
- 松岡古墳群 (Japanese)
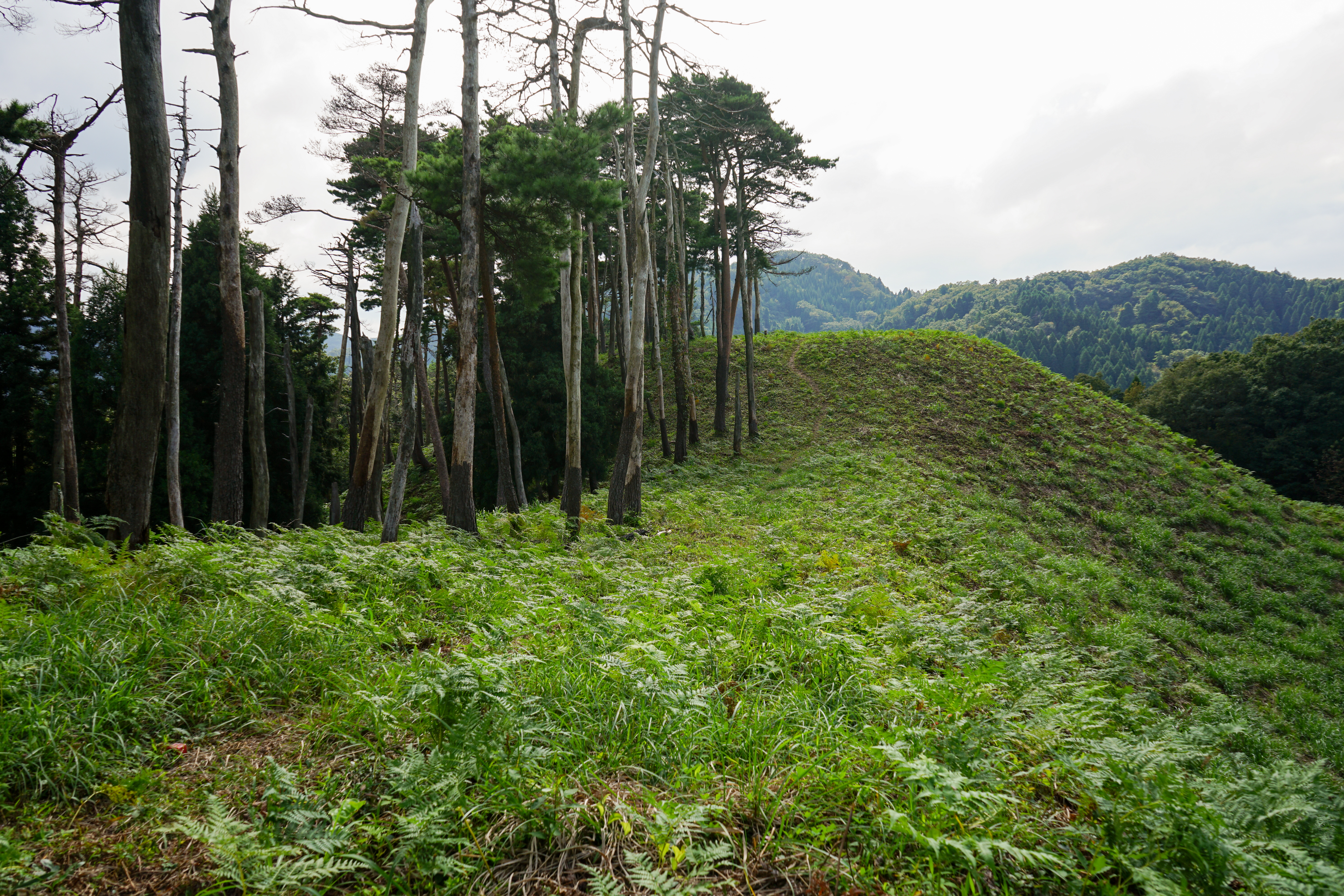
- Tegurigajoyama Kofun

- Matsuoka Kofun cluster Matsuoka Kofun Cluster (Japan)
- Interactive map of Matsuoka Kofun
- 36°05′35″N 136°18′53.2″E
- Type: kofun
- Periods: Kofun period
- Location: Eiheiji, Fukui, Japan
- Region: Hokuriku region

History
- Built: late 4th or early 5th century AD

Site notes
- Public access: Yes (no facilities)

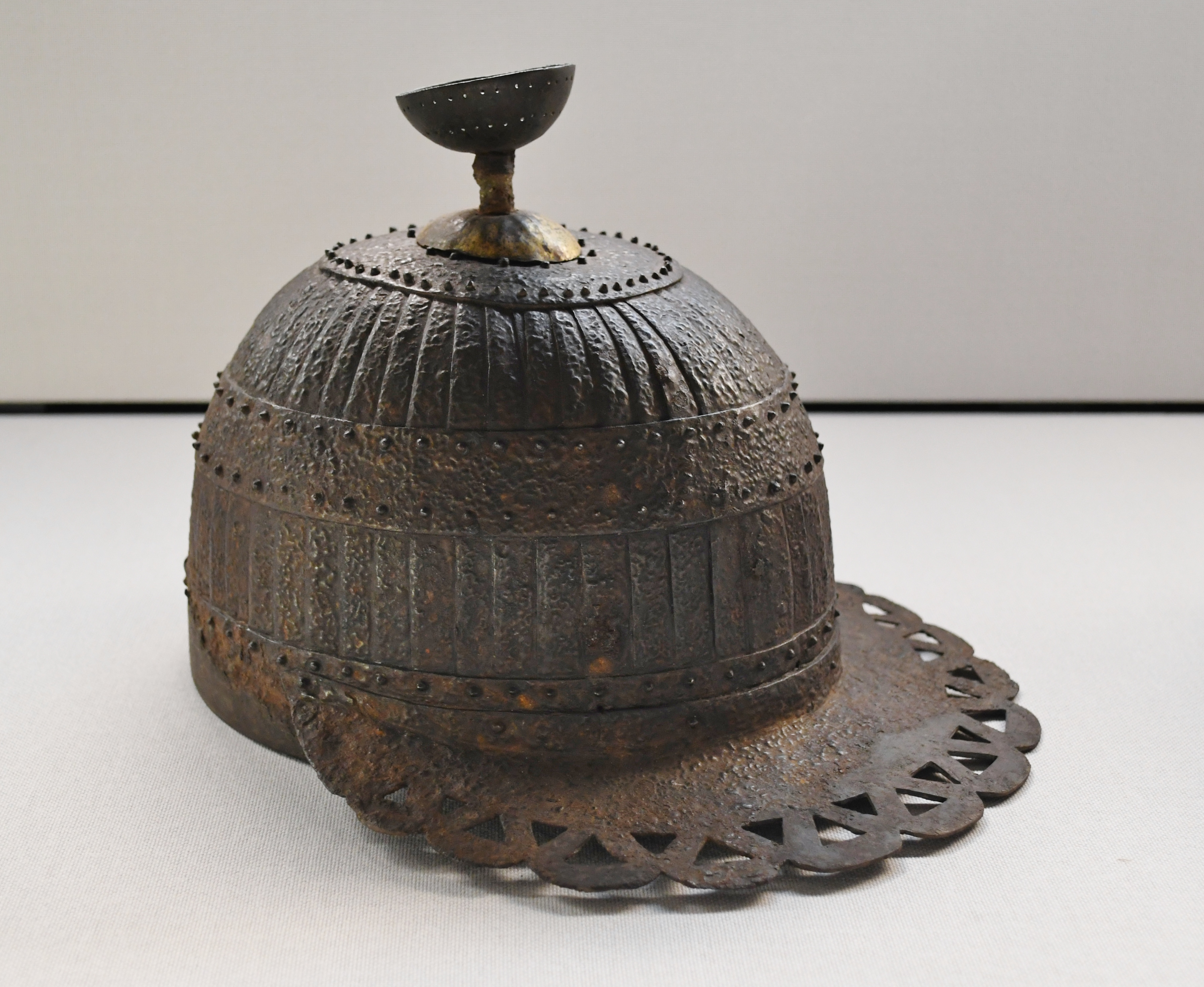
Broze helm recovered from the Nihonmatsuyama Kofun

The Matsuoka Kofun Cluster (松岡古墳群, Matsuoka Kofun-gun) is a group kofun burial mounds located in what is now part of the town of Eiheiji, Fukui in the Hokuriku region of Japan. The site was designated a National Historic Site of Japan in 1977 in the case of the Tegurigajoyama Kofun, the largest of the group. Protection was extended to three additional tumuli in the group in July 2005.

== Overview ==
The Matsuoka Kofun Cluster is located on a hillside with an elevation of 160 meters, overlooking the Kuzuryū River and the eastern edge of the Echizen Plain. Across the Kuzuryū River, on a hill, is the Rokuroseyama Kofun Cluster, which has a separate National Historic Site designation. The Matsuoka Kofun Cluster consists of about 150 tumuli, which are a mixture of square tumuli, circular tumuli, and keyhole-shaped tumuli. Among these tumuli, the four large keyhole-shape tumuli, (zenpō-kōen-fun (前方後円墳), which are shaped like a keyhole, having one square end and one circular end, when viewed from above), which are estimated to date from the mid 4th to the late 5th century AD are covered under the National Historic Site designation. The tombs do not appear in any historical records and the name of rank of the persons buried within are unknown, although per local legend, these were the graves of the "Kings of Koshi" (越の国), the pre-imperial dynasty state which controlled present-day Fukui, Ishikawa, Toyama and Niigata Prefectures. Emperor Keitai ((reigned 507 – 531 AD)) is said in some semi-legendary historical records to have originally been the King of Koshi, and therefore that the kofun in this area are the tombs for members of his clan.

The site is about a 20-minute walk from Shiizakai Station on the Echizen Railway Katsuyama Eiheiji Line to the Tegurigajoyama Kofun.

== The kofun ==
Tegurigajoyama Kofun (手繰ヶ城山古墳) is the largest of the four tumuli, with a total length of 128.4 meters, making it is the second largest found in the Hokuriku region of Japan after the Rokuroseiyama Kofun. The circular portion is 78 meters in diameter and 19.7 meters high; the rectangular portion is in two tiers, with a length of 50.4 meters, width of 56.5 meters and a height of 15.2 meters. The tumulus is orientated to the northeast. It has a peculiar morphology in which the front part is extremely widened like a drumstick. A protruding structure is found near the narrowest part, with a square secondary mound at its tip. Large numbers of fukiishi and cylindrical and morning glory-shaped haniwa were found surrounding the top and flat middle tier. The details of the interior are unknown as the kofun has not been excavated; however, ground-penetrating radar has confirmed that a stone-lined burial chamber exists near the apex of the posterior circle. The tumulus was dated to the middle of the fourth century AD.

Torigoeyama Kofun (鳥越山古墳) is the smallest of the four tumuli, with a total length of 53.7 meters; however, it was found to have a boat-shaped stone sarcophagus and two horizontal passage graves. A large number of grave goods were also uncovered, including stone spearheads, whetstones, fragments of iron implements, earthenware and horse fittings. The tumulus was partly carved out of the ground, and has no tiers. Haniwa have been found at the top of the posterior circle. It was dated to the middle of the fifth century.

Ishifuneyama Kofun (石舟山古墳) is also a keyhole-shaped tumulus, and has a total length of 79.1 meters, with a secondary tumulus on its southwest side. The main tumulus has two-tiers, and haniwa have been found. It also dates from the middle of the fifth century. It was robbed at some unknown time, so no grave goods have been recovered. Fragments of a boat-shaped stone sarcophagus are exposed, thus leading to its name.

Nihonmatsuyama Kofun (二本松山古墳) is a two-tier dome-shaped tumulus with a total length of 89 meters, although there is considerable controversy as to its structure, and prevalent option is that it is actually a keyhole-shaped tumulus which has partly collapsed. It is built facing southwest on the summit of Nihonmatsuyama at an elevation of 273 meters on the south bank where the Kuzuryū River enters the Fukui Plain. A projection is attached to the eastern narrow end of the mound, and beyond this is a mound that appears to be a secondary tomb. Fragments of haniwa were found on the exterior. It was excavated in the Edo period (1716–1736) and records from that time indicate that armor and human remains were found and reburied. However, when was extensively excavated twice in the Meiji period (1880 and 1906) the circular was found to contain the direct burial of wo stone coffins, only one of which had been disturbed by the Edo period excavation. As a result numerous grave goods remained from the second burial, including a boat-shaped sarcophagus, a gilt-bronze crown, a four-animal bronze mirror, cylindrical beads, and armor. These place the construction of the tumulus to the late 5th century, during the middle of the Kofun period. According to legend, this tumulus is the grave of Furuhime, the mother of the semi-legendary Emperor Keitai.

== See also ==
- List of Historic Sites of Japan (Fukui)
