= Katsuragi clan =

Katsuragi clan 葛城氏
- Parent house: Imperial House of Japan
- Founder: Katsuragi no Sotsuhiko
- Founding year: 4th century

The Katsuragi clan (葛城氏, Katsuragi-uji) was a Japanese aristocratic kin group (uji) that flourished during the Kofun period.

== History ==
The Katsuragi clan was founded by Katsuragi no Sotsuhiko (葛城 襲津彦), a great-grandson of the legendary Emperor Kōgen. During the 5th century the clan was the most prominent power in the court and intermarried with the imperial family. After the Katsuragi declined in the late 5th century, the Ōtomo clan temporarily took its place. When Emperor Buretsu died with no apparent heir, it was Ōtomo no Kanamura who recommended Emperor Keitai, a very distant imperial relative who resided in Koshi Province, as the new monarch. However, Kanamura resigned due to the failure of his diplomatic policies, and the court was eventually controlled by the Mononobe and Soga clans at the beginning of the Asuka period.

== Family Tree ==
- Emperor Kōgen (孝元天皇, 273BC–158BC)
  - Hikofutsuoshinomakoto-no-mikoto (彦太忍信命, ?–?)
    - Yanushioshiotakeogokoro-no-mikoto (屋主忍男武雄心命, ?–?)
      - Takenouchi no Sukune (武内宿禰, ?–?)
        - Katsuragi no Sotsuhiko (葛城襲津彦, ?–?)
          - Katsuragi no Tamada no Sukune (葛城玉田宿禰, ?–416)
            - Katsuragi no Tsubura no Ōomi (葛城円大臣)
              - Katsuragi no Karahime (葛城韓媛), wife of Emperor Yūryaku
            - Katsuragi no Kehime (葛城毛媛), wife of Kibi no Tasa (吉備田狭)
          - Iwa-no-hime-no-mikoto (磐之媛命), empress of Emperor Nintoku
          - Katsuragi no Ashida no Sukune (葛城葦田宿禰)
            - Katsuragi no Ari no Omi (葛城蟻臣)
              - Hae-hime (荑媛), wife of Ichinobe-no-Oshiwa-no-miko, crown prince of Emperor Richū
            - Kuro-hime (黒媛), empress of Emperor Richū
          - Katsuragi no Koshimo no Sukune (葛城腰裾宿禰)
          - Katsuragi no Ikuha no Toda no Sukune (的戸田宿禰)
          - Kumamichi no Tarine (熊道足禰)
          - name unknown
            - name unknown
              - Unakami no Sukune (菟上足尼)

== See also ==
- Kofun period
- Soga clan
- Nakatomi clan
- Mononobe clan
