= Matsura Sayohime =

Legendary heroine in Japanese mythology

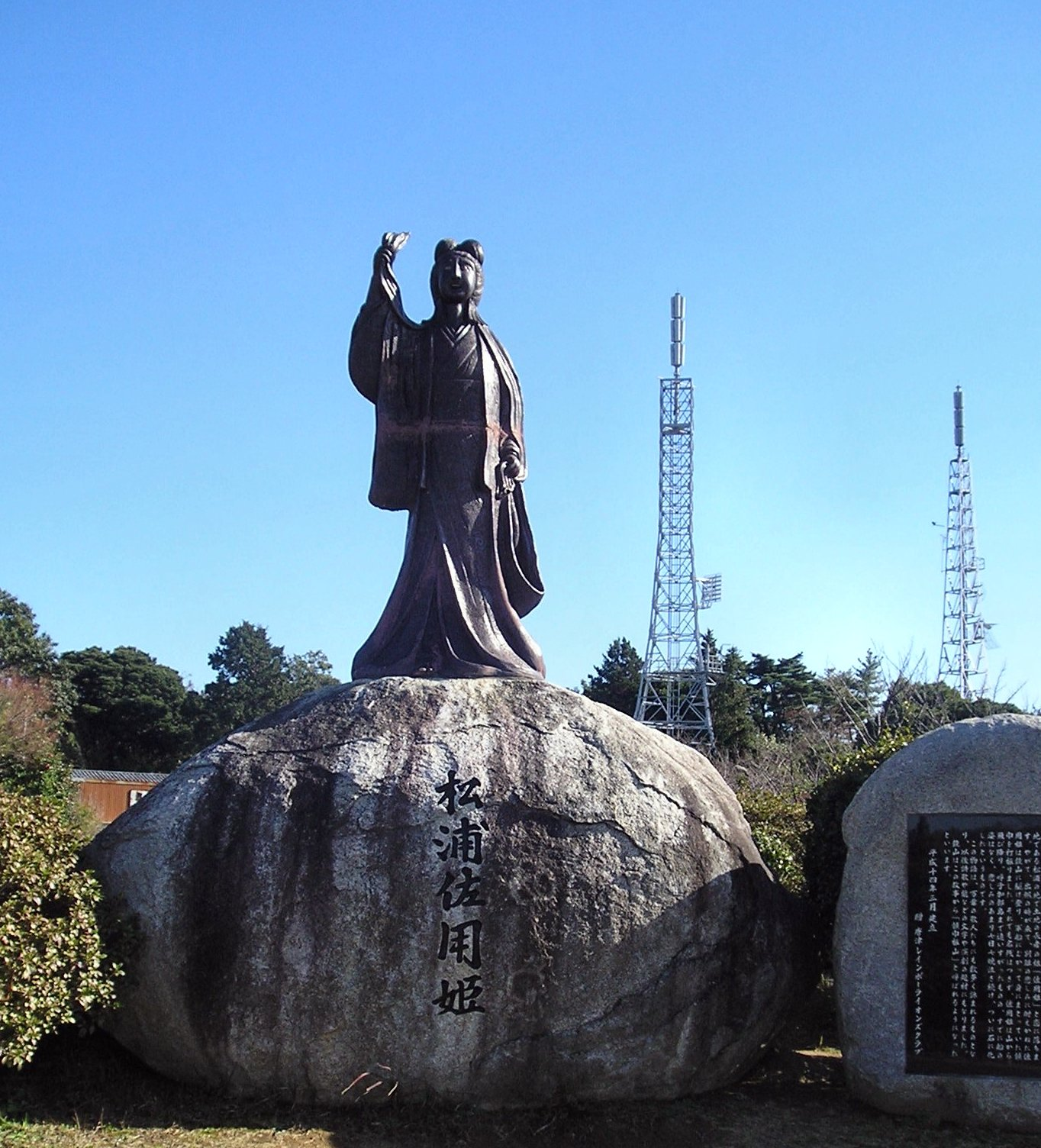
Bronze statue of Sayohime, near the summit of Kagamiyama

Matsura Sayohime or Matsura no Sayohime (松浦佐用姫; "Lady Sayo of Matsura") ('Lady Sayo of Matsura' (Note: Also 'Lady Matsura')) or Matsuura Sayohime (Note: Although the reading is not always clear, some late (Edo Period) primary sources appear to style her "Matsuura", and in the paper by Yanagita (1971) (Yanagita (1942) [1927]) her name is read "Matsuura Sayohime" translated 'Princess Matsuura' (English citation by Okuyama.) was a legendary heroine in Japanese mythology, the wife of the historical Ōtomo no Satehiko. She is referred to as Lady Otohi or Otohihime in an alternate ancient source.

The core legend was that she climbed atop a hill and so piteously waved her scarf (hire) at her husband's departing warship that the location afterwards was remembered as Hire-furi-no-mine or "Scarf-Waving Peak", now known as Mount Kagami in the confines of the present-day city of Karatsu, Saga. The locale fell within the former Matsura-gun, referred to as the "Matsuura region" in modern parlance.

However, the variant legend added that she was afterwards visited by her husband's look-alike and though she discovered the imposter to be a snake, she had gone missing and was eventually found dead. Later otogizōshi (fairy tale) versions of Sayohime, which were also readapted as sekkyō-bushi, i.e., Buddhist "sermon ballad" pieces under the title Matsura chōja, contained an alteration of this plot where the heroine, in an act of filial piety, selling herself to be sacrificed to a serpent deity. Her life is ultimately spared in the fairy tale version.

The legend also recalled that she dropped a precious mirror which was a gift from her husband, and later it came to be believed that she had committed suicide by throwing herself into the river while clutching the mirror. This was then dramatized for the noh theatre in the early 15th century.

The motif of Otohihime/Sayohime waving her scarf from the mountaintop has been illustrated in picture books and woodblock prints.

== Old legends ==
The legends of Matsura Sayohime (aka Otohihime) waving her scarf (hire, a piece of long cloth worn as part of the attire) at the warship carrying her husband are preserved in two ancient pieces of writing, written down some two hundred years after the supposed event took place in the 6th century.

=== Manyoshu version ===
Matsura Sayohime, according to the oldest account related in the poem collection Man'yōshū (8th century), was the wife of Ōtomo no Satehiko (or Sadehiko). In order to bid farewell to her husband, who was on a ship bound for Korea for a military campaign, she climbed atop a certain mountain peak. So deep was her sorrow: she seemed "gut-wrenchedly" chagrined and darkened-hearted as if her "soul had vanished". (Note: The verbatim original text reads that she "disappointedly cleft her liver and despondently erased her soul悵然に肝を断ち、黯然に魂を銷す". Since this cannot be taken literally, the paraphrase in modern language (Inaoka) was consulted.) Finally, she managed to remove her own scarf and wave it, drawing others around her inevitably to tears.

==== Date ====
Ōtomo no Satehiko was known historically to have been dispatched on two military expeditions to Korea, and the setting of the legend concerns his first trip which occurred in the year 537; though it is the other Fudoki version of the legend described below which supplies the detail which leads to narrowing down this date. (Note: Satehiko's embarked on his military assignments to Korea in the years 537 and 562, and the first trip was to aid the Japanese-aligned Mimana (Nihon shoki). Note that "Mimana" is mentioned in the Hizen fudoki version of the legend.)

==== Location ====
The Matsura region, Sayohime's alluded place of origin, spans the current-day Nagasaki and Saga Prefectures. However, the specific mountaintop that had been dubbed Hirefurinomine (領巾麾嶺; "Scarf-Waving Peak"), as attested in the Man'yōshū, has been identified as the summit of Mount Kagami, on the eastern edge of the city of Karatsu, Saga. (Note: Japanese sources state the mountain overlooks Karatsu Bay (Karatsu wan), whereas Cranston says there is a view to "Matsura Bay". It is not entirely clear whether he meant Matsura-gata (松浦潟) on the current map (a "lagoon" which is part of Karatsu Bay), or the old name Matsura-wan (松浦湾) which is somewhat ambiguous.)

=== Fudoki version (as Otohi) ===
In the alternate version of the old legend preserved in the Hizen fudoki (8th century), the Lady Otohi (or Otohihime)of Shinuhara or Shinohara (篠原) (Note: The reading of the first character "篠" is commonly read "shino" in the modern day, but its pronunciation is given as shinu (志弩) in the ancient text.) village appears as the name of the famed farewell-bidding wife of Ōtomo no Satehiko.

"Otohi" may indeed be the woman's proper name, (Note: Kamochi Masazumi's Man'yōshū kogi (万葉集古義) (c. 1827), vol. 1, Lower Heaven (下天). And modern scholar Yūkichi Takeda's position is similar.) however, it may also be a descriptor, with the word otohi having some meaning that is an extension of the oto ("youthful, innocent") element, or possibly meaning "those of younger age". (Note: The word otohi as a common noun find usage in several kuni-bome or land-praising songs, and some scholars explain it to be a land-praising word.) The Lady Otohi is also referred to as otohime ("younger [sister] lady") in the poem inserted in the Fudoki account. (Note: The English translator Cranston asserts that the similarity between Otohi and otohime is merely fortuitous.)

This version recounts that the lady dropped a mirror given by her husband at a ford, or river crossing, and thenceforth the place was named Kagami-no-watari (鏡の渡り; "Mirror Crossing").

This version proceeds to tell the aftermath since the day the woman parts with Satehiko (waving her scarf at the Peak): she received visits from a look-alike of her husband for five nights in a row. Resolving to discover this man's true identity, she tied a "hemp" thread to the hem of his clothing and tracked him, thereby learning his true form: a snake residing at the marsh on the Scarf-Waving Peak. She was subsequently reported missing, and a search led to her skeletonized remains in the marsh.

A tale presenting this thread/yarn motif has been called the clew-of-yarn type (苧環型説話, odamaki-gata setsuwa) by Japanese scholars, and in the so-called Miwa-san setsuwa (三輪山説話; "Mt. Miwa Story"), Ikutamayori-hime (Lady Ikutamayori) employs the same trick to discover the true form of the snake god Ōmononushi. (Note: The name "Mt. Miwa Story" is the name scholars use for this particular myth (Nagano; for discussion in English cf. Kelsey). But this title is ambiguous, because there is also a different tale involving another wife (Yamato Todohimomosohime) of the Mt. Miwa snake deity, which Cranston compares to the Matsura-hime legend. This wife was so shocked by the god's serpent form she took her own life in a brutal manner using a chopstick. But the latter seems to be distinguished by calling it the Hashi-haka denshō/densetsu (箸墓伝承/伝説; "legend of Hashihaka"), i.e. Hashihaka='The Grave of the Chopstick[s]'.)

=== Suicidal drowning ===
Fujiwara no Norikane wrote a commentary on waka poetry entitled Waka dōmōshō (和歌童蒙抄) (c. 1145) which probably due to a misreading of the Fudoki, states that the lady, grasping the mirror given to her, sunk into the waters of the Kuri River (later called Kagami River, now Matsuura River). (Note: Norikane also misread or miscopied the lady's name as "The Fourth Lady-child (noble daughter) (第四姫子)".)

=== Petrification version ===
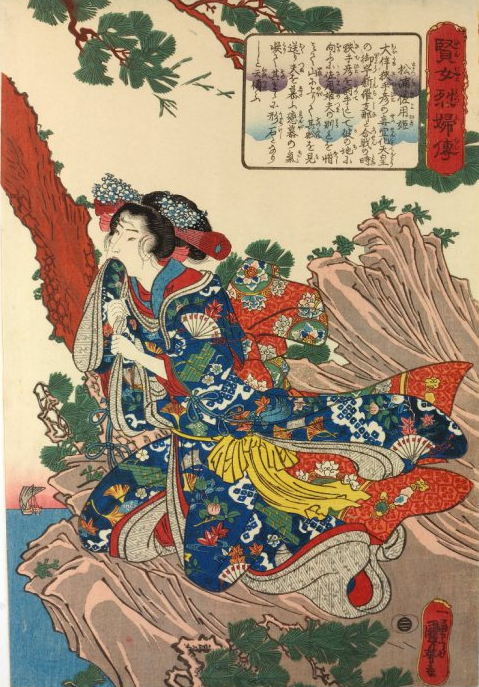
Matsura Sayo-hime. Caption refers to the petrification (Note: "..the vital force (ki) of her love, in its exact original shape, transformed into stone (恋慕の気凝りて、そのままに形(かたち)石となり)".) —by Utagawa Kuniyoshi. Series: Kenjo reppuden or "Stories of Wise and Strong Women".

According to one version of this legend, she prayed with such fervour that she was transformed into stone. This petrification lore of Sayohime appears to be of later development, with its earliest attestation identified as renga poet Bontōan's Sodeshita shū (c. Ōei era, late 14th to early 15th century). This lore of Sayohime's petrification is thought to have developed from a misunderstanding: a misreading of Jikkinshō (13th century), which ponders on the Sayohime legend and makes reference to the petrification motif taken from an old Chinese work called the Youminglu. Sayohime's petrification is also mentioned in Nihon meijo monogatari (1670).

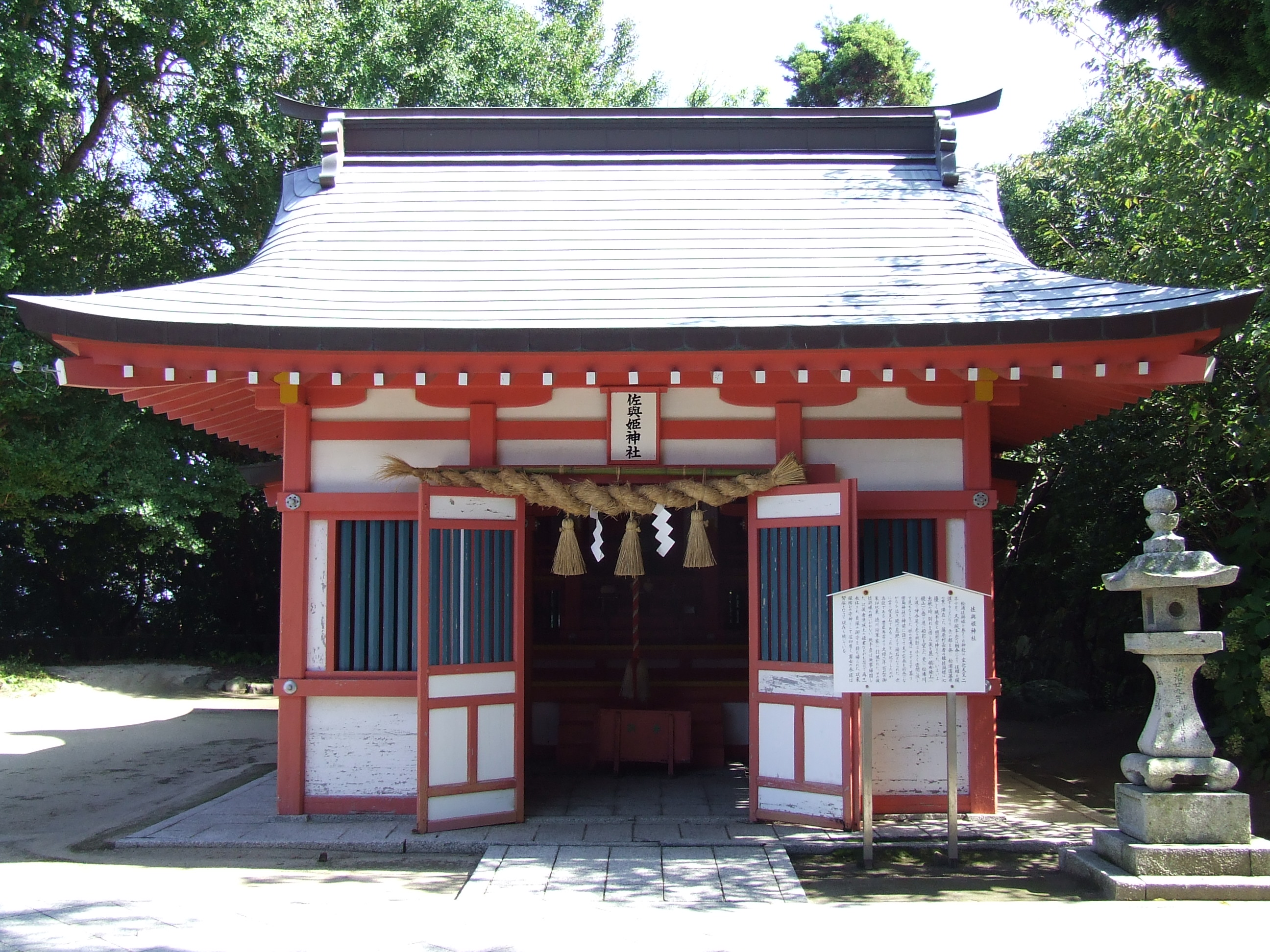
Sayohime Shrine

Her supposed petrified remains, an example of a bōfuseki (望夫石; "rock that contemplates the husband"), is housed as the shintai ("body of the kami") at the Sayohime Shrine, an undershrine of Tashima Shrine on Kabe Island. The claim regarding her petrification on this island is given in a late account of the origin of this undershrine, preserved in the 19th century document called the Matsura komonjo (松浦古文書) (written during the Bunka era). It states that the lady did not stop at the Scarf-Waving Peak bidding farewell, but she continued to a spot (Note: At the place she saw the island, she called out Satehiko's name, hence the spot was named Yobu na no ura (呼名の浦; lit. the 'name-calling inlet-shore'), which later became the town of Yobuko.) from whose vantage point she beheld an island nearby. She then hopped on a fishing boat to that island, called the Himekami-jima (姫神島) island (present-day Kabe Island) where she climbed a "bit elevated spot" and there, out of sorrow, she turned intorock. Commentators identify this elevatation as the Tendō-dake (天童岳) or Dentō-dake (伝登岳).

== Literary adaptations ==
During the early Muromachi Period. The post-medieval narratives of Matsura Sayohime (まつらさよひめ) exists in several variant texts of various forms, e. g., hand-copied manuscripts and illustrated books of the Nara ehon type, sermons, scripts for the jōruri puppet theater, and printed books.

=== Noh play ===
Matsura no Kagami ('The Mirror of Matsura'), also referred to as Matsuura Sayohime [sic.] is also the title of a noh play about the character, whose authorship is ascribed to Zeami. There has survived a holograph copy in Zeami's own hand entitled Matsura no Noh, dated 10th month of 1427/Ōei 24, which closely matches the script text of Matsura no Kagami except for minor differences.

The noh play, adopts the embellished legend where Sayohime drown herself in the sea while clutching the mirror, instead of just losing it. The suicidal drowning had been claimed in literature predating the noh play, such as the aforementioned 12th century Waka dōmōshō and Priest Yua's Shirin saiyōshō (詞林采葉抄; "Commentary of Leaves from a Forest of Words", 1366).

=== Monogatari versions ===
There are some 7 texts of the fairy tale or monogatari/otogizōshi version of Sayohime. The two full, or "expanded versions" (広本, kōhon) are the unillustrated "Akagi-bunko" library text entitled Sayohime no sōshi dating to the Keichō era (late 16th or early 17th century) and the illustrated book (Nara ehon) Sayohome in the possession of Kyoto University.

The remaining monogatari texts belong to the "abridged version" (略本, ryakubon) group, and bear alternate titles such as Tsubosaka monogatari (壺坂物語) (Note: Preserved as an emaki or illustrated scroll.) or Chikubushima no honji (ちくふしまのほんし; "The Chikubushima Deity in Her Original Form" (Note: An illustrated printed book is thus titled.)). The latter title (~ honji, the "original" Buddhist deity) is a reference to the tale purporting to reveal the origins of the principal goddess Benzaiten worshipped at Chikubushima Shrine in Ōmi Province, i.e., on an island in Lake Biwa.

==== Plot summary ====
The Sayohime no sōshi (A text) and the Sayohime (K text) have their opening setting relocated to Tsubosaka in Yamato Province (present-day Nara Prefecture), (Note: The original legend is set in Matsuura in Kyushu, which is far south. In these monogatari versions, the girl's place of origin is Yamato Province (present-day Nara Prefecture), in central Japan. She later sells herself to a man residing up north in Mutsu.) where a wealthy man named Matsura Chōja (松浦長者; A) or Lord Kyōgoku (京極殿; K) and his wife prayed to the Bodhisattva Kannon of Hase-dera until they were finally blessed with the birth of a daughter, Sayohime. But the rich man died penniless, and Sayohime could not afford to sponsor a memorial service for him except by selling herself. Her buyer was a man named Konka no Tayū (こんかの大夫; A) (or "Gonga no Tayū"), (Note: It is not actually clear whether "Konka" or "Gonga" or "Gonka" is the correct reading.) who unbeknownst to Sayohime intended to sacrifice her to the snake deity of his village in place of his own daughter. When presented to the snake, Sayohime read from the Lotus sutra, enabling the deity to achieve enlightenment and shed its monstrous form. The deity then returned Sayohime to the care of her mother.

=== Buddhist perspective ===
The Kyoto text has been translated into English by R. Keller Kimbrough in Eight Buddhist Tales (2013). There is actually a sekkyō-bushi (Buddhist "sermon ballad") version known as Matsura chōja (まつら長じや; "The Millionaire of Matsura", 1661) (Note: Kimbrough mostly describes the text as a sekkyō-shōhon or "true text" of the sekkyō aka sekkyō bushi, but these various terms are explained in his glossary. Some researchers describe this title as a sermon puppet play (sekkyō jōruri).) (Note: The sermon text dated to Kanbun 1 or 1661 is styled Matsura chōja (まつら長じや), while the text dated to c. Hōei 1 (c. 1704) is styled Matsura chōja (まつら長者). Kimbrough calls these the 1661 and circa 1704 Matsura Chōja texts.) which bears close correspondence to the Kyoto text of Sayohime, and thought to derive from it.

=== Self-sacrifice ===
The illustrations and text from the Frankfurt emaki manuscript has been analyzed and translated into German by Katja Triplett, with self-sacrifice and human sacrifice being the central themes. The heroine in an act of self-sacrifice "sells oneself" (身売り, miuri) into slavery, into the hands of a human trafficker in order to achieve a deed of filial piety. Needless to say, the common understanding (usual fate) of a miuri woman is that she is selling herself into prostitution, not slavery. But in the Sayohime saga we have divine intervention, and the Kasuga Myōjin deity of Nara disguised as an octagenerian priest intervenes so that Sayohime is discovered and bought by a seeker of a substitute virgin sacrifice (Gonga Tayū), rather than a brothel. Although the story is told as if Gonga from Michinoku up north is the one obtaining sympathy and help from his clan deity (ujigami) based in Nara, the readers realize that the deity is actually responding to the pleas of the girl Sayohime from Nara.

=== Puppet plays ===
The tales were also adapted to oku jōruri, a regional type of jōruri puppet plays. (Note: Under such titles as Chikubushima no honji (竹生島之本地) or Yakushinyorai honji Matsura Sayohime tanjōki (薬師如来本地松浦佐夜姫誕生記) .)

=== Gesaku ===
The petrification legend was adapted by Takizawa Bakin (d. 1848) into a burlesque novel (gesaku) under the title Matsura Sayohime sekkonroku (松浦佐用媛石魂録; "The Great Stone Spirit of Matsura")
