= Kofun period =

Period of Japanese history from 258/300 to 538/710 AD

- Ethnic groups during Yamato Kingship rule
- Religion: Shinto, Buddhism
- Language: Japonic and Classical Chinese
- Geographical range: Yamato Kingship, Japanese archipelago
- Period: Yamato period
- Dates: c. 3rd Century–538 AD
- Type site: Kofun
- Major sites: Imashirozuka Kofun, Mozu Tombs
- Preceded by: Yamatai (Yayoi period)
- Followed by: Asuka period

The Kofun period (古墳時代, Kofun jidai) is an era in the history of Japan from about 300 to 538 AD, the date of the introduction of Buddhism in Japan, following the Yayoi period. The Kofun period and the subsequent Asuka period are sometimes collectively referred to as the Yamato period. This period is the earliest era of recorded history in Japan, but studies rely heavily on archaeology because the chronology of historical sources is often distorted. Kofun is Japanese for the type of tumuli dating from this era.

It was a period of cultural import. Continuing from the Yayoi period, the Kofun period is characterized by influence from China and Korea; archaeologists consider it a shared culture across the southern Korean peninsula, Kyushu and Honshu. On the other hand, wealthy zempō-kōen fun (keyhole kofun) during this period were approximately 5000 from the middle of the 3rd century in the Yayoi period to the 7th century in the Asuka period in the Japanese archipelago, and many of them were massive.

In comparison, in the southern Korean peninsula, there were only 13 from the 5th century to the 6th century, and the tombs were small. Wall decorations and Japanese-style armour characteristic of kofun were excavated from 5th-century burial mounds in the southern Korean peninsula. This indicates that Japan and the southern Korean peninsula influenced one another.

According to the Nihon Shoki (720), Buddhism and the Chinese characters were introduced near the end of the period from Baekje. The Kofun period recorded Japan's earliest political centralization, when the Yamato Kingship rose to power in southwestern Japan and helped control trade routes across the region.

== Kofun tombs ==
Keyhole-shaped kofun drawn in 3DCG (Nakatsuyama Kofun in Fujiidera, Osaka, 5th century)

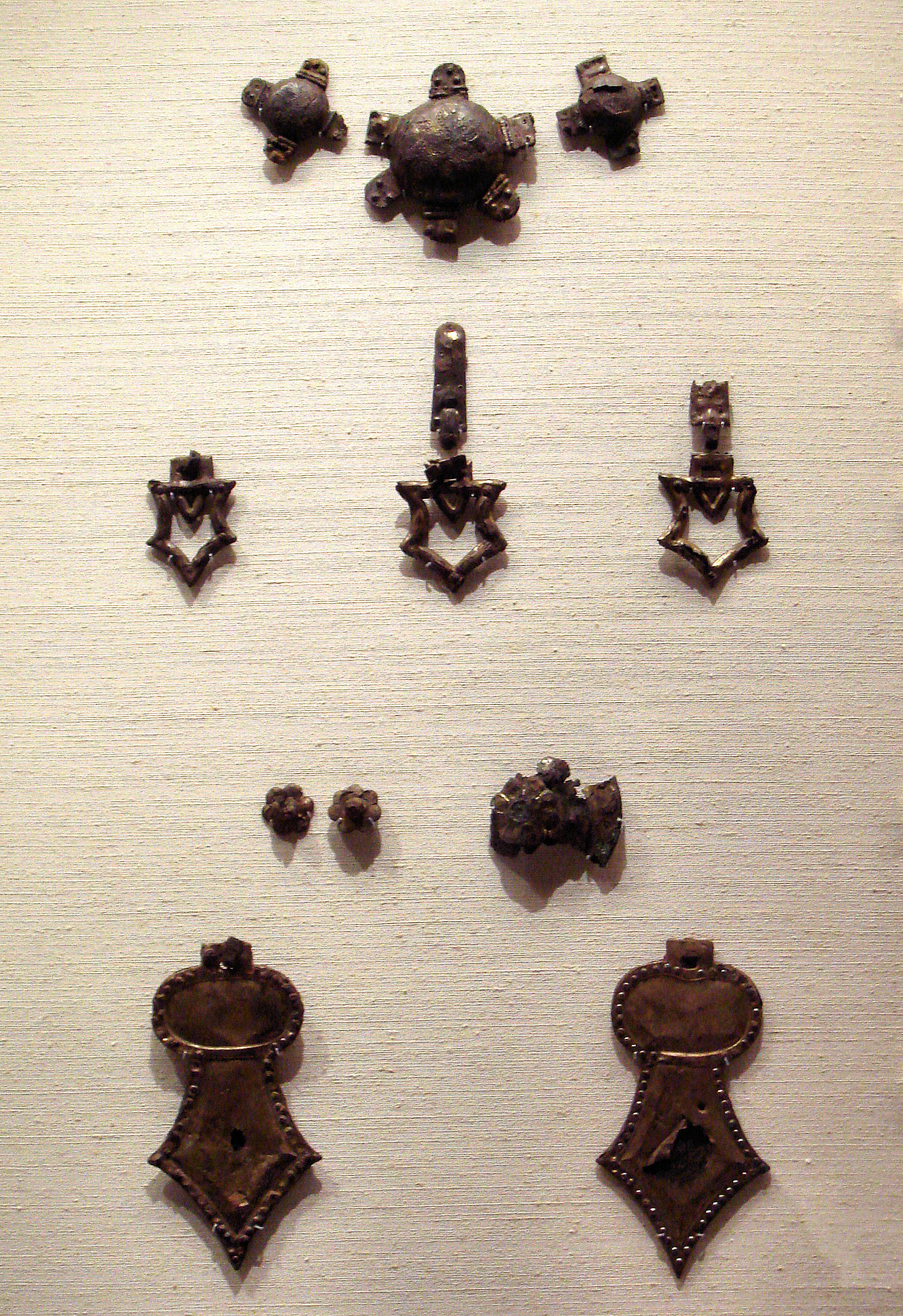
Kofun-period horse ornaments (British Museum)

Kofun (古墳, ancient tumuli) are tumuli built for the ruling class from the 3rd to the 7th centuries in Japan, and the Kofun period takes its name from these distinctive earthen mounds. Kofun contained large stone burial chambers, and some are surrounded by moats.

Kofun have four basic shapes: round and square are the most common, followed by hotategaikei kofun 'scallop-shell kofun' and zempō-kōen fun 'keyhole kofun.' The keyhole tomb is a distinct style found only in Japan, with a square front and a round back. Kofun range in size from several meters to over 400 meters long, and haniwa (unglazed pottery figures) were often lined by the hundreds on the top of a kofun's circumference.

=== Development ===
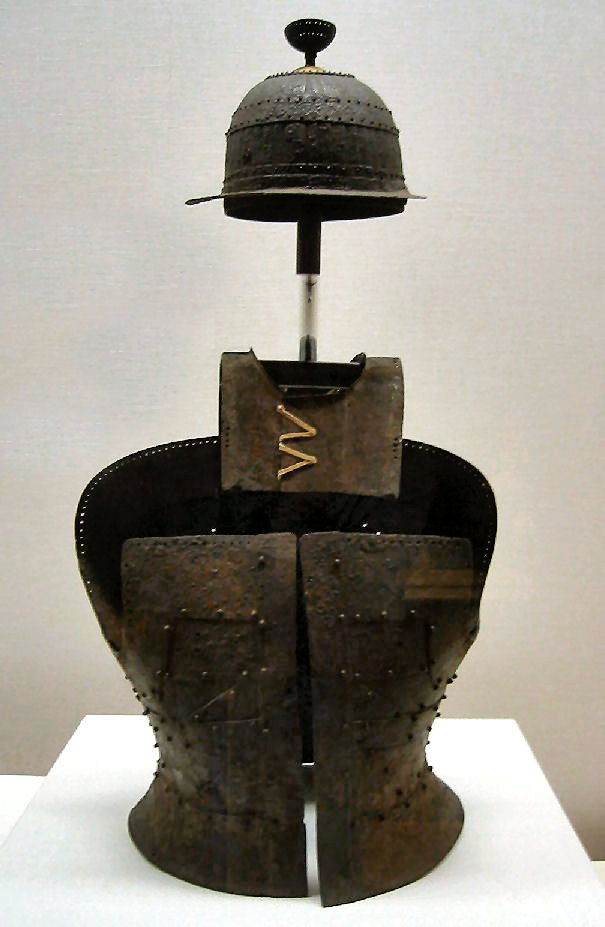
Iron tankō armour and helmet, with gilt bronze decoration, 5th century CE (Tokyo National Museum)

The oldest Japanese kofun is reportedly Hokenoyama Kofun in Sakurai, Nara, which dates to the late 3rd century. In the Makimuku district of Sakurai, later keyhole kofuns like Hashihaka Kofun, Shibuya Mukaiyama Kofun) were built during the early 4th century. The keyhole kofun spread from Yamato Province to Kawachi Province, with giant kofun, such as Daisenryō Kofun, and then throughout the country during the 5th century. Keyhole kofun disappeared later in the 6th century, probably due to the drastic reformation of the Yamato court; the Nihon Shoki records the introduction of Buddhism at this time. The last two great kofun are the 190-metre-long (620 ft) Imashirozuka Kofun in Õsaka, currently believed by scholars to be the tomb of Keitai, and the 135-metre-long (443 ft) Iwayayama Kofun in Fukuoka, recorded in the Fudoki of Chikugo as the tomb of Tsukushi no kuni no Miyatsuko Iwai, the political archrival of Keitai.

Kofun burial mounds on the island of Tanegashima and two ancient Shinto shrines on Yakushima suggest that these islands were the southern boundary of the Yamato Kingship; it extended north to Tainai in the present-day Niigata Prefecture, where excavated mounds have been associated with a person closely linked to the Yamato kingdom.

== Yamato court ==
The Yamato Kingship is usually believed to have begun c. 250, and it is generally agreed that its rulers were associated with keyhole kofun culture and hegemony in Yamato until the 4th century. Autonomy of local powers remained throughout the period, particularly in Kibi (the present-day Okayama Prefecture), Izumo (current Shimane Prefecture), Koshi (current Fukui and Niigata Prefecture), Kenu (northern Kantō), Chikushi (northern Kyushu), and Hi (central Kyushu). During the 6th century, the Yamato clans began to dominate the southern half of Japan. According to the Book of Song, Yamato's relations with China likely started in the late 4th century.

The Yamato polity, which emerged by the late 5th century, was distinguished by powerful clans (豪族, gōzoku). Each clan was headed by a patriarch (氏上, Uji no kami), who performed sacred rituals to the clan's kami (objects of worship) to ensure its long-term welfare. Clan members were the aristocracy, and the royal line, which controlled the Yamato court, was at its zenith. Clan leaders were awarded kabane, inherited titles denoting rank and political standing, which replaced family names.

The Kofun period is sometimes called the Yamato period by Western scholars, as this local chieftainship later became the imperial dynasty at the end of the period. However, the Yamato clan ruled just one polity among others during the Kofun era. Japanese archaeologists emphasize that other regional chieftainships, such as the Kingdom of Kibi, were in close contention for dominance in the first half of the Kofun period; Kibi's Tsukuriyama Kofun is Japan's fourth-largest.

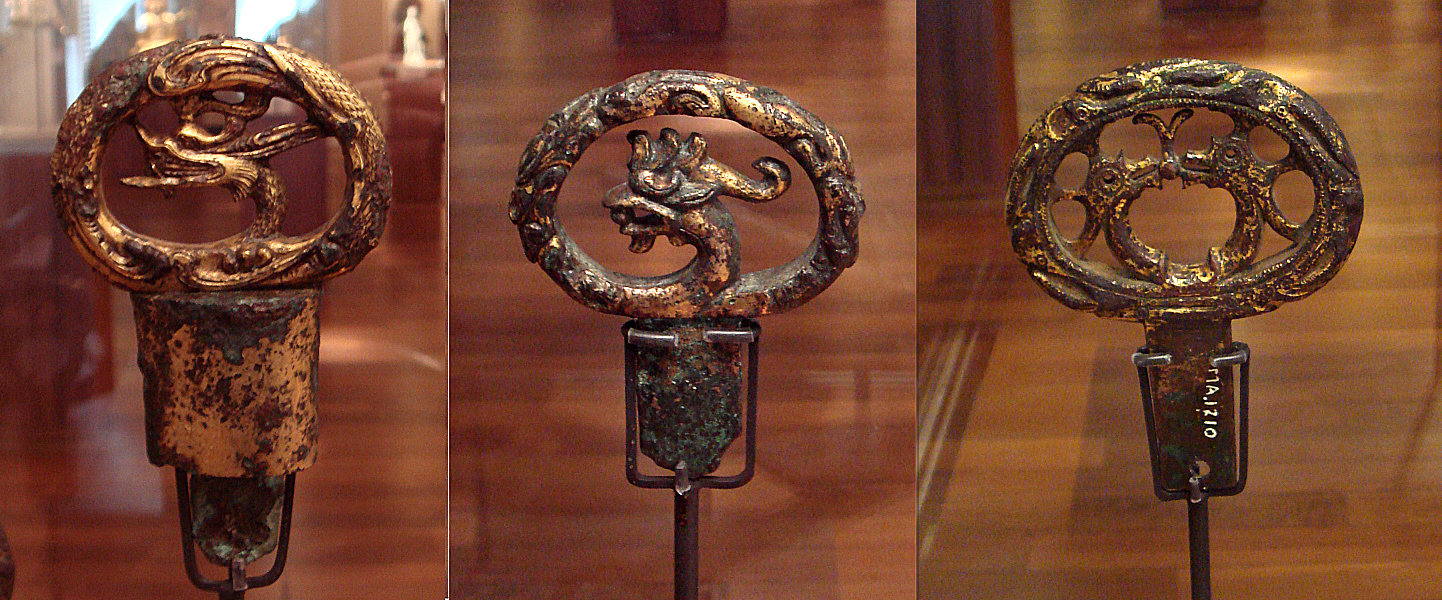
Gilded sword hilts, late Kofun period, 6th century

The Yamato Kingship exercised power over clans in Kyushu and Honshu, bestowing titles (some hereditary) on clan chieftains. The Yamato name became synonymous with Japan as the Yamato rulers suppressed other clans and acquired agricultural land. Based on Chinese models, including the adoption of the Chinese written language, they began to develop a central administration and an imperial court attended by subordinate clan chieftains with no permanent capital. Powerful clans were the Soga, Katsuragi, Heguri and Koze clans in the Yamato and Bizen Provinces and the Kibi clans in the Izumo Province. The Ōtomo and Mononobe clans were military leaders, and the Nakatomi and Inbe clans handled rituals. The Soga clan provided the government's chief minister, the Ōtomo and Mononobe clans provided secondary ministers, and provincial leaders were called kuni no miyatsuko. Craftsmen were organized into guilds.

=== Territorial expansion ===
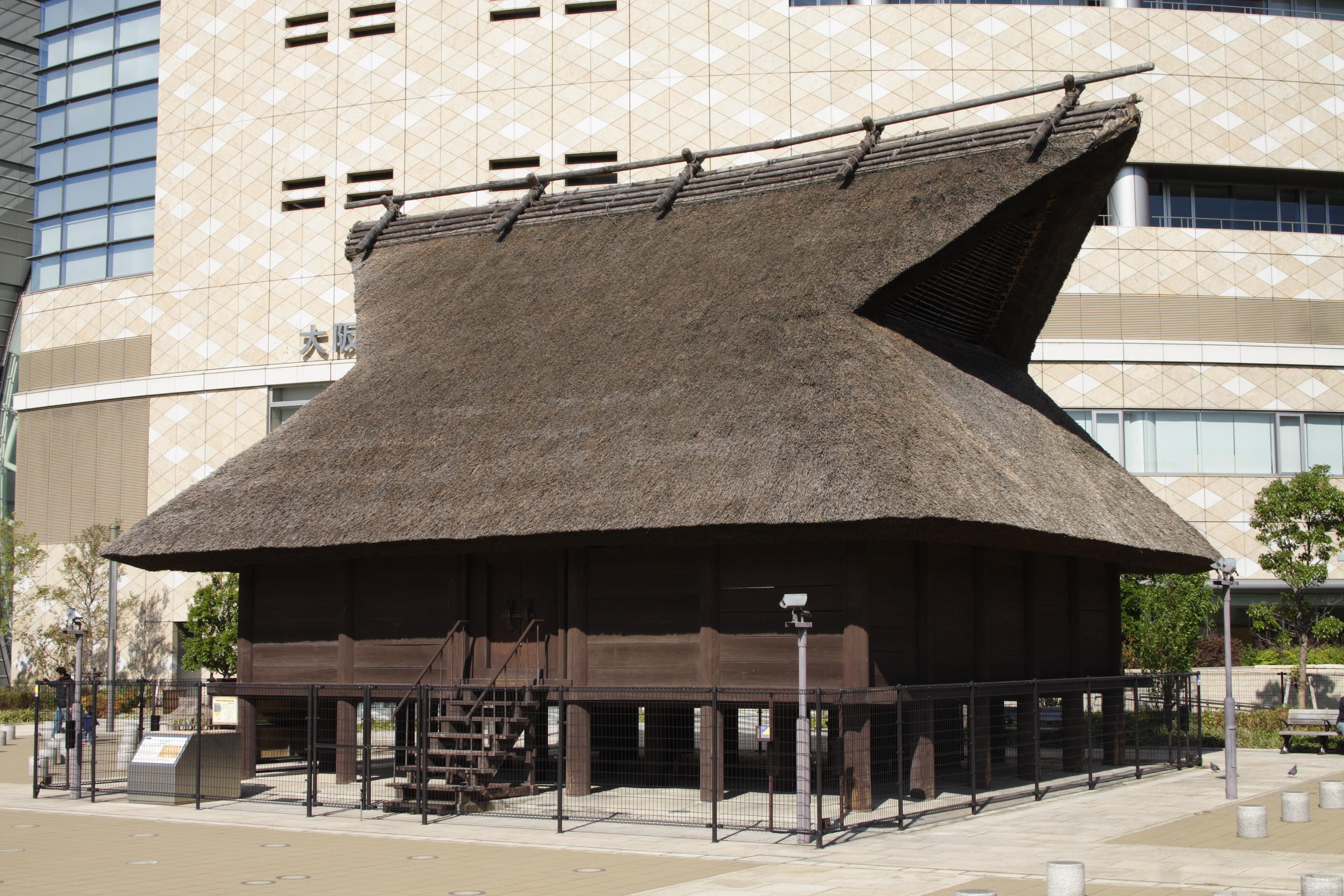
Reconstructed Kofun-era warehouse

In addition to archaeological findings indicating the Kingdom of Kibi as a significant rival, the legend of the 4th-century culture hero Yamato Takeru alludes to the borders of the Yamato and battlegrounds in the region; a frontier was near the later Izumo Province (eastern present-day Shimane Prefecture). The frontier in Kyushu was apparently located north of present-day Kumamoto Prefecture. According to the legend, there was an eastern land in Honshu "whose people disobeyed the imperial court" and against whom Yamato Takeru was sent to fight. It is unclear if the rival country was near the Yamato nucleus or further away. Kai Province is mentioned as a location where Yamato Takeru travelled on his military expedition.

The period's northern frontier was described in Kojiki in the legend of the Shido shogun (四道将軍, Shōguns to four ways) expedition. One of four shōguns, Prince Ōhiko, set out northward to Koshi, and his son, Take Nunakawawake, left for the eastern states. The father moved east from northern Koshi, and the son moved north; they met at Aizu, in what is now western Fukushima Prefecture. Although the legend is probably not factual, Aizu is near southern Tōhoku, the northern extent of late-4th-century keyhole kofun culture.

=== Ōkimi ===
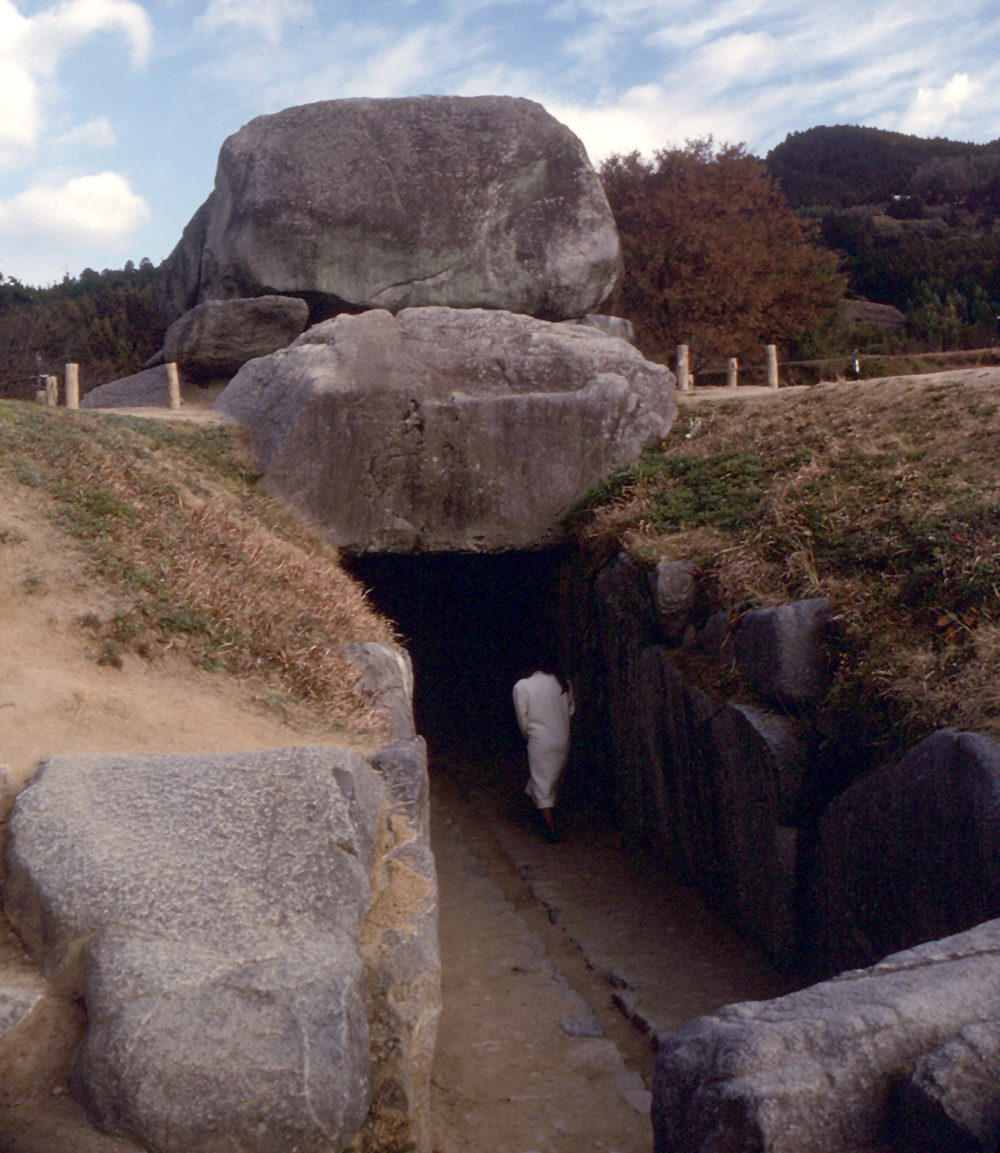
Ishibutai Kofun, a late kofun in Nara Prefecture

During the Kofun period, an aristocratic society with militaristic rulers developed. The period was a critical stage in Japan's evolution into a cohesive, recognized state. The society was most developed in the Kinai region and the eastern Setouchi region. Japan's rulers petitioned the Chinese court for confirmation of royal titles.

While the rulers' title was officially "King", they called themselves Ōkimi (大王, Great Lord)) during this period. Inscriptions on two swords (the Inariyama Sword and the Eta Funayama Sword) read Amenoshita Shiroshimesu (治天下; "ruling Heaven and Earth") and Ōkimi, indicating that the rulers invoked the Mandate of Heaven. The title Amenoshita Shiroshimesu Ōkimi was used until the 7th century, when it was replaced by Tennō.

=== Clans ===
Many of the clans and local chieftains that composed the Yamato polity claimed descent from the imperial family or the kami. Archaeological evidence for the clans is found on the Inariyama Sword, on which the bearer recorded the names of his ancestors to claim descent from Ōbiko, recorded in the Nihon Shoki as a son of Emperor Kōgen). Several clans claimed origin in China or the Korean peninsula.

During the 5th century, the Katsuragi clan (葛城氏, descended from the legendary grandson of Emperor Kōgen) was the most prominent power in the court and intermarried with the imperial family. After the clan declined, late in the century, it was replaced by the Ōtomo clan. When Emperor Buretsu died with no apparent heir, Ōtomo no Kanamura recommended Emperor Keitai (a distant imperial relative in Koshi Province) as the new monarch. Kanamura resigned due to the failure of his diplomatic policies, and the court was controlled by the Mononobe and Soga clans at the beginning of the Asuka period.

== Society ==
=== Toraijin ===
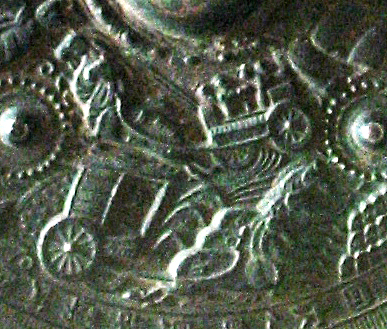
Detail of chariots on a Chinese bronze mirror sent to Japan during the Kofun period. From the Eta-Funayama Tumulus, Kumamoto (Tokyo National Museum)

Toraijin refers to people who immigrated to Japan from abroad via the Ryukyu Islands or the Korean peninsula. They introduced numerous, significant aspects of Chinese culture to Japan such as Chinese writing system and Buddhism from India. Valuing their knowledge and culture, the Yamato government gave preferential treatment to toraijin. According to the Shinsen Shōjiroku (815), 317 of 1,182 clans in the Kinai region of Honshu were considered to have foreign ancestry. Through currently disputed by modern historians, 163 were of Chinese origin (written as "Kan"), 104 from Baekje ("Paekche" in the older romanization), 41 from Goguryeo, 6 from Silla, and 3 from the Gaya confederacy. They are believed to have immigrated to Japan between 356 and 645.

=== Influential immigrants ===
Some of the many immigrants that had significant influence in Kofun period Japan included Wani, Yuzuki no Kimi and Achi no Omi, the founders of Kawachinofumi clan/Kawachinoaya clan, Hata clan and Yamato no Aya clan, respectively. Despite being ethnically similar, many immigrants from Baekje and Silla had arrived in Japan during Emperor Ōjin's reign carrying separate identities and foreign deities such as the kami Inari.

Other immigrants who settled in Japan beginning in the 4th century were the progenitors of Japanese clans. According to Kojiki and Nihon Shoki, the oldest record of a Silla immigrant is Amenohiboko: a legendary prince of Silla who settled in Japan at the era of Emperor Suinin, possibly during the 3rd or 4th centuries.

Baekje and Silla sent their princes as hostages to the Yamato court in exchange for military support. King Muryeong of Baekje was born in Kyushu (筑紫) of Japan as the child of a hostage in 462, and left a son in Japan who was an ancestor of the minor-noble Yamato no Fubito (和史, "Scribes of Yamato") clan. According to the Shoku Nihongi (続日本紀), Yamato no Fubito's relative (Takano no Niigasa) was a 10th-generation descendant of King Muryeong of Baekje who was chosen as a concubine for Emperor Kōnin and was the mother of Emperor Kanmu. In 2001, Emperor Akihito confirmed his ancient royal Korean heritage through Emperor Kanmu.

== Culture ==
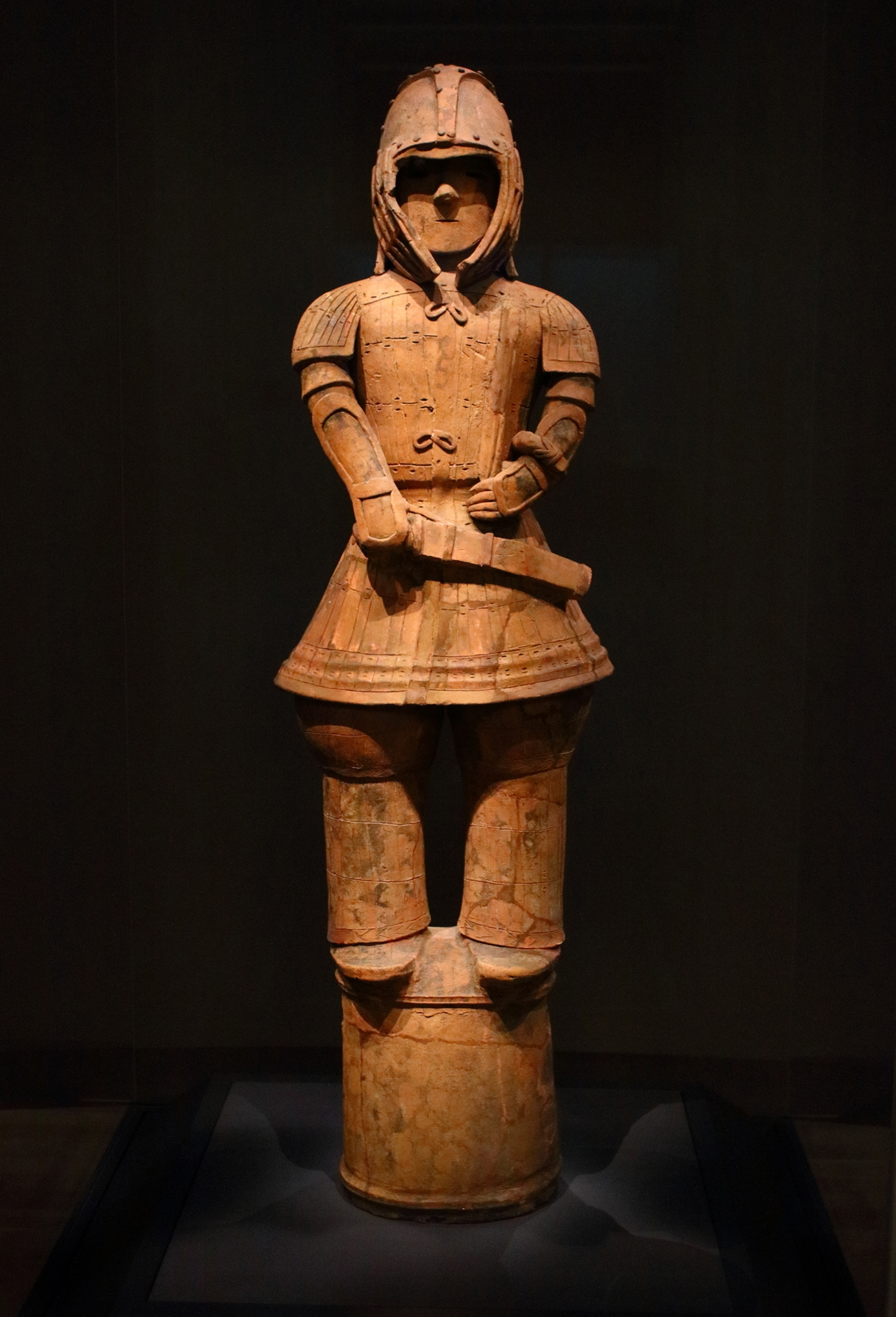
Haniwa warrior in keiko armor (NT)

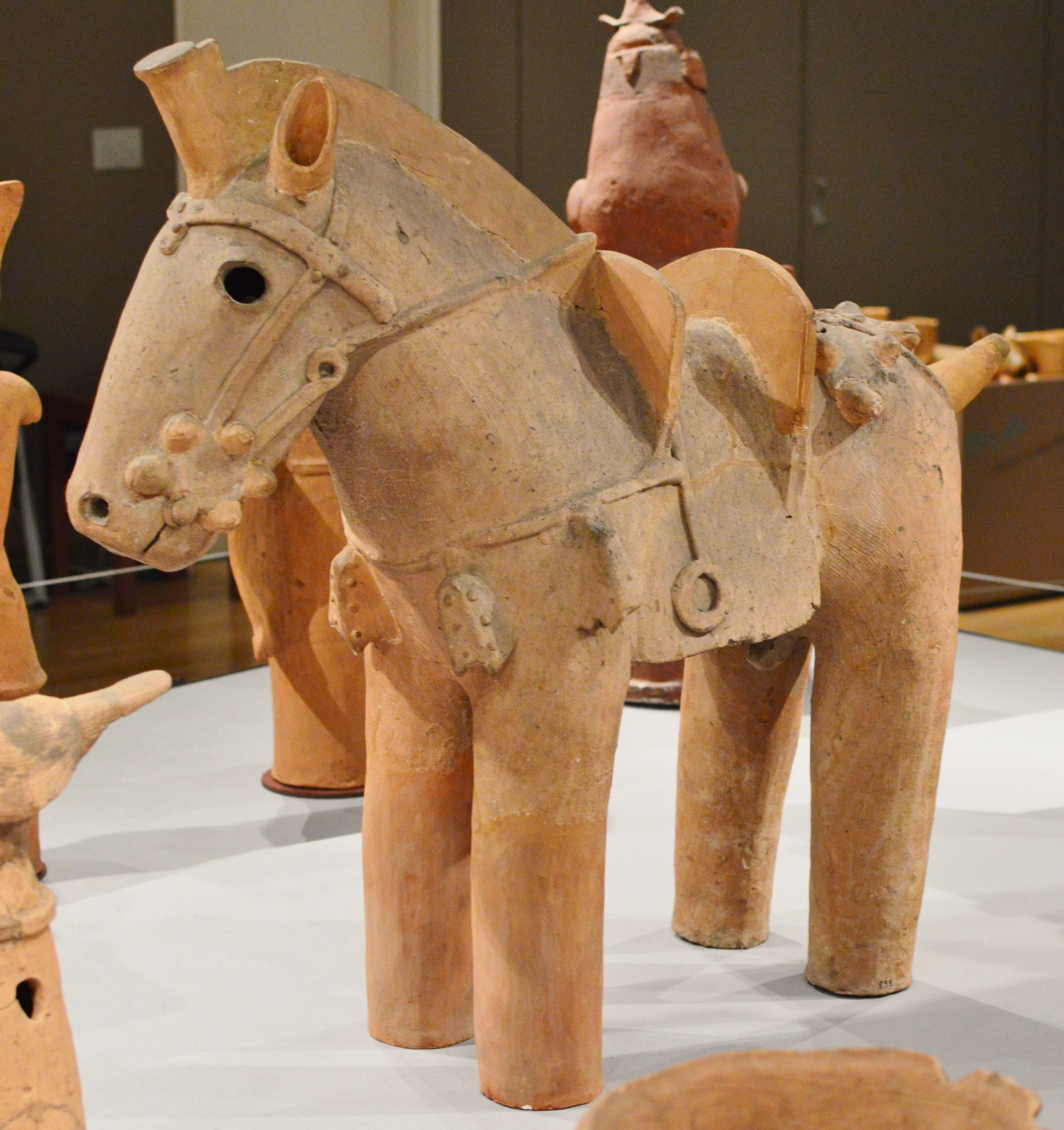
Haniwa horse from Kamichūjō (ICP)

=== Language ===
Chinese, Japanese, and Koreans wrote historical accounts primarily in Chinese characters, making original pronunciation difficult to trace. Although writing was largely unknown to the indigenous Japanese of the period, the literary skills of foreigners seem to have been increasingly appreciated by the Japanese elite. The Inariyama Sword, tentatively dated to 471 or 531, contains a Chinese character inscription in a style used in China at the time.

=== Haniwa ===
The cavalry wore armour, carried swords and other weapons, and used advanced military methods similar to those of Northeast Asia. Evidence of the advances is seen in haniwa (埴輪; "clay ring"), clay offerings placed in a ring on and around the tomb mounds of the ruling elite. The most important of these haniwa were found in southern Honshu (especially the Kinai region around Nara Prefecture) and northern Kyushu. Haniwa grave offerings were sculpted as horses, chickens, birds, fans, fish, houses, weapons, shields, sunshades, pillows, and male and female humans. Another funerary piece, the magatama (勾玉; "curved jewel"), became symbolic of imperial power.

=== Introduction of material culture ===
Much of the material culture of the Kofun period demonstrates that Japan was in close political and economic contact with continental Asia (especially with the southern dynasties of China) via the Korean peninsula; bronze mirrors cast from the same mould have been found on both sides of the Tsushima Strait. Irrigation, sericulture, and weaving were brought to Japan by immigrants, who are mentioned in ancient Japanese histories; the Hata clan introduced sericulture and certain types of weaving.

== Asuka period ==
The introduction of Buddhism in 538 marked the transition from the Kofun to the Asuka period, which coincided with the reunification of China under the Sui dynasty later in the century. Japan became deeply influenced by Chinese culture, adding a cultural context to the religious distinction between the periods.

== Relations with other East Asian kingdoms ==
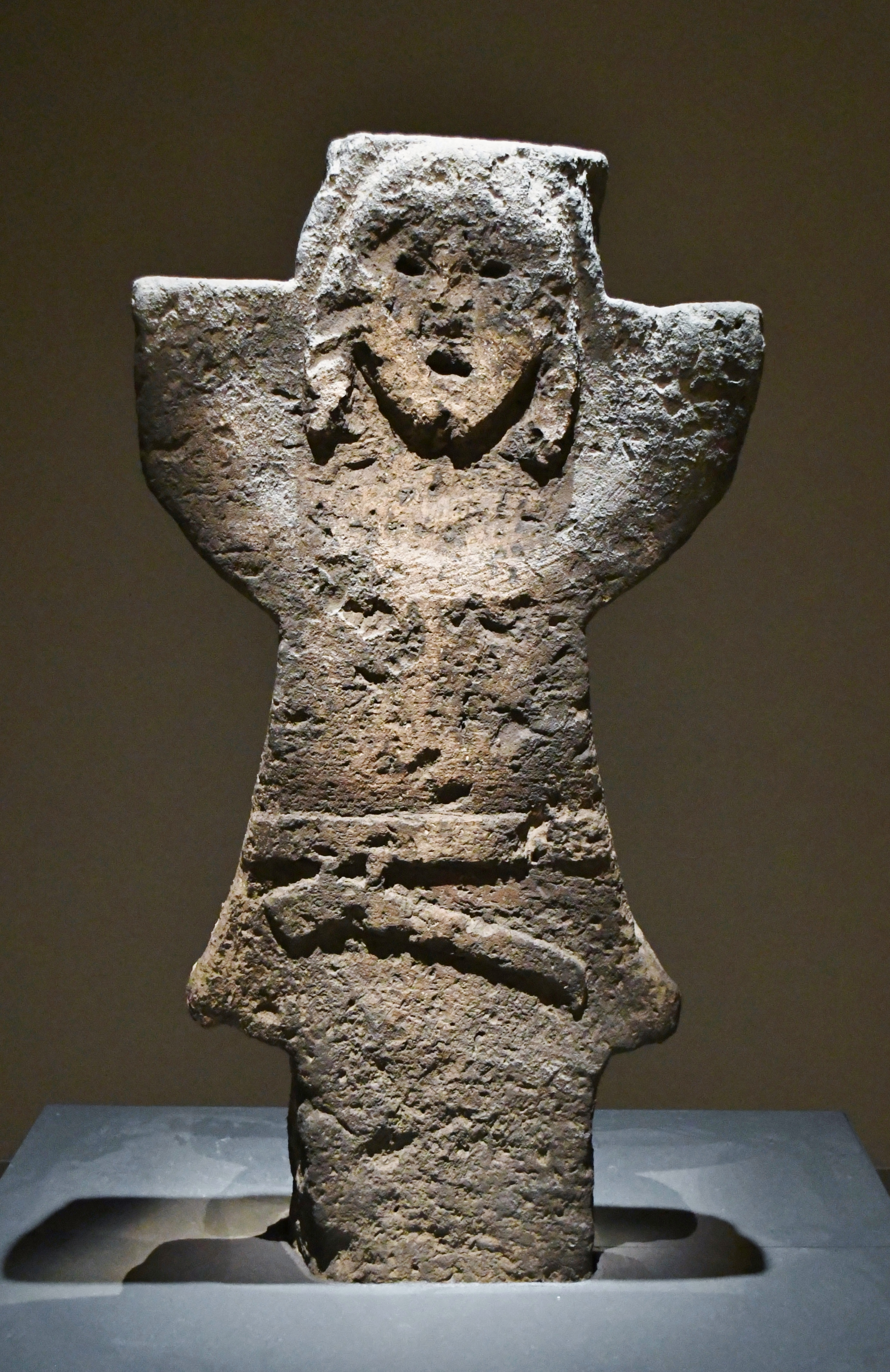
Sekijin sekiba were likely inspired by the spirit paths of China.

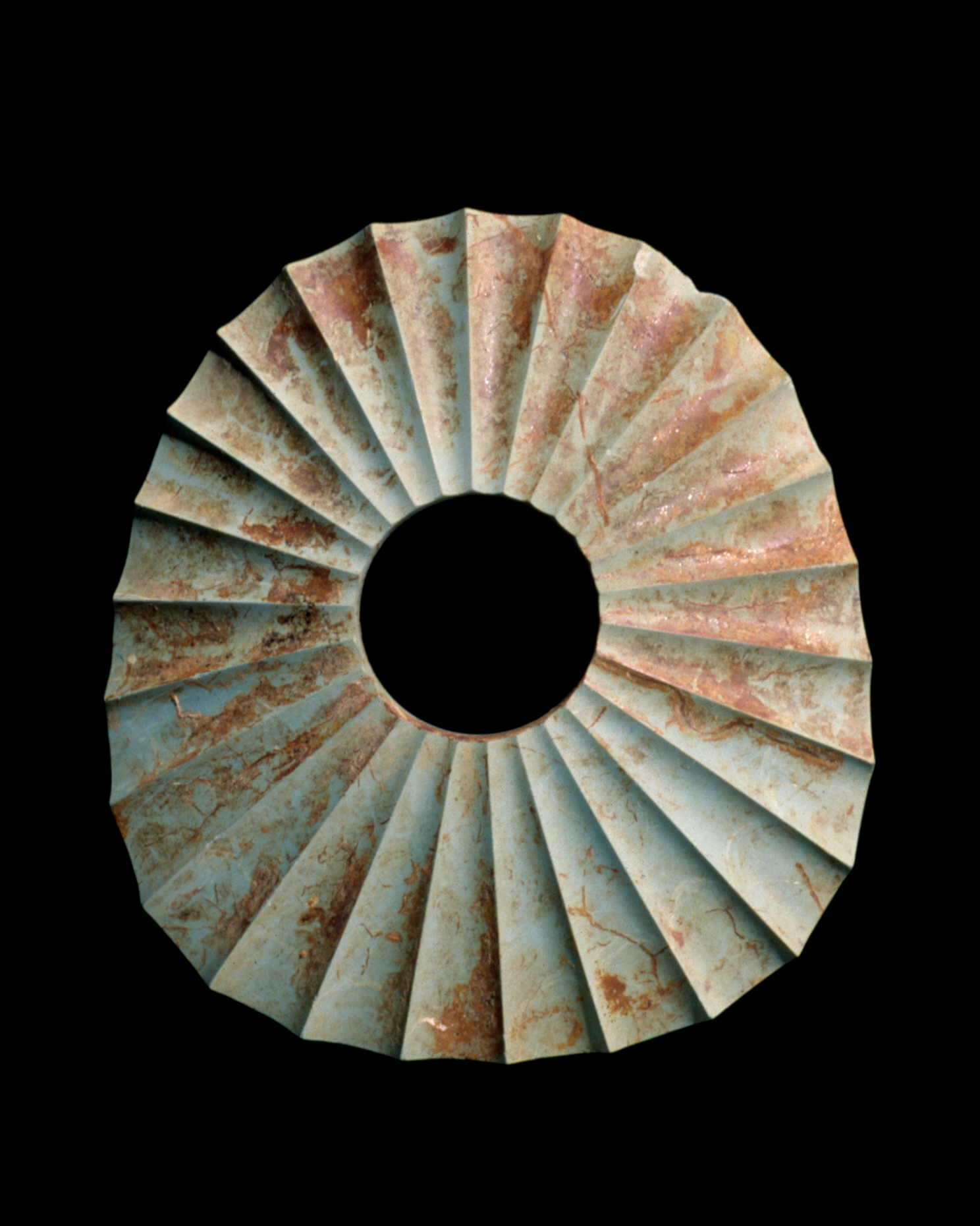
The development and eventual disappearance of sharin-seki has been linked to continental influence.

=== Chinese records ===
According to the Book of Sui, Silla and Baekje greatly valued relations with the Kofun period Wa and the Korean kingdoms made diplomatic efforts to maintain their good standing with the Japanese. The Book of Song reported that a Chinese emperor appointed the five kings of Wa in 451 to supervise military affairs of Wa, Silla, Imna, Gara, Jinhan and Mahan.

=== Japanese records ===
According to the Nihon Shoki, Silla was conquered by the Japanese Empress-consort Jingū in the third century. However, due to lack of evidence, this story is considered to be mythological in nature. It reported that the prince of Silla came to Japan to serve the emperor of Japan, and lived in Tajima Province. Known as Amenohiboko, his descendants are the aforementioned Empress Jingū, and Tajimamori the god of sweets. According to the Kojiki and Nihon Shoki, Geunchogo of Baekje presented stallions, broodmares and trainers to the Japanese emperor during Emperor Ōjin's reign.

According to the Kojiki and Nihon Shoki, Baekje had also sent a scholar by the name of Wani during the reign of Emperor Ōjin. He is said to be the pioneer of the introduction of the Chinese writing system to Japan.

=== Korean records ===
The Samguk sagi reported that Baekje and Silla sent their princes as hostages to the Yamato court in exchange for military support to continue their military campaigns; King Asin of Baekje sent his son (Jeonji) in 397, and King Silseong of Silla sent his son Misaheun in 402. It is said that Hogong, an individual from Japan, helped to found Silla.

== Genetics ==
Some researches propose that there was a separate group that entered Japan during the Kofun period. According to proponents of this theory, this group possessed high amounts of East Asian genes and were related to the ancient Yellow River farmers which was different from the previous migrants. This is known as the Tripartite ancestry theory.

However, others state that the theory is relatively weak as previous migrants also showed markers that were similar to the alleged "Kofun migrants" and are skeptical to the claims made by the advocates. Nonetheless, some differences are detected in other studies, with the Kofun population showing less genetic affinities to coastal East Eurasian and Jōmon lineages than the Yayoi population for instance.

== Results of the Japan-South Korea Joint Historical Research ==
Under an agreement reached at the 2001 Japan-South Korea summit, Japanese and South Korean historians conducted joint historical research in two phases, including the relationship between Japan and the Korean peninsula during the Kofun period. The point at issue was the "Mimana Nihon-fu" (任那日本府) which was said to be the governing institution Japan established in Korea at that time. After the controversy, Japanese and South Korean historians agreed that there were Japanese in the south of Korea and that the term "Mimana Nihon-fu" was not used at the time and should not be used as it was misleading. However, they could not agree on the position of the Japanese people in Korea at that time. The Japanese side claimed that the institutions established in Korea by the Japanese people were not under the control of Koreans, but were operated independently by the Japanese people and conducted diplomatic negotiations with the Gaya confederacy. On the other hand, the South Korean side claimed that the agency was the diplomatic office of Gaya, which employed the Japanese as bureaucrats of Gaya. The collaboration ended in 2010 with the publication of a final report describing the above. The full text of the minutes concerning the joint research is disclosed by the Japanese side.

== Gallery ==
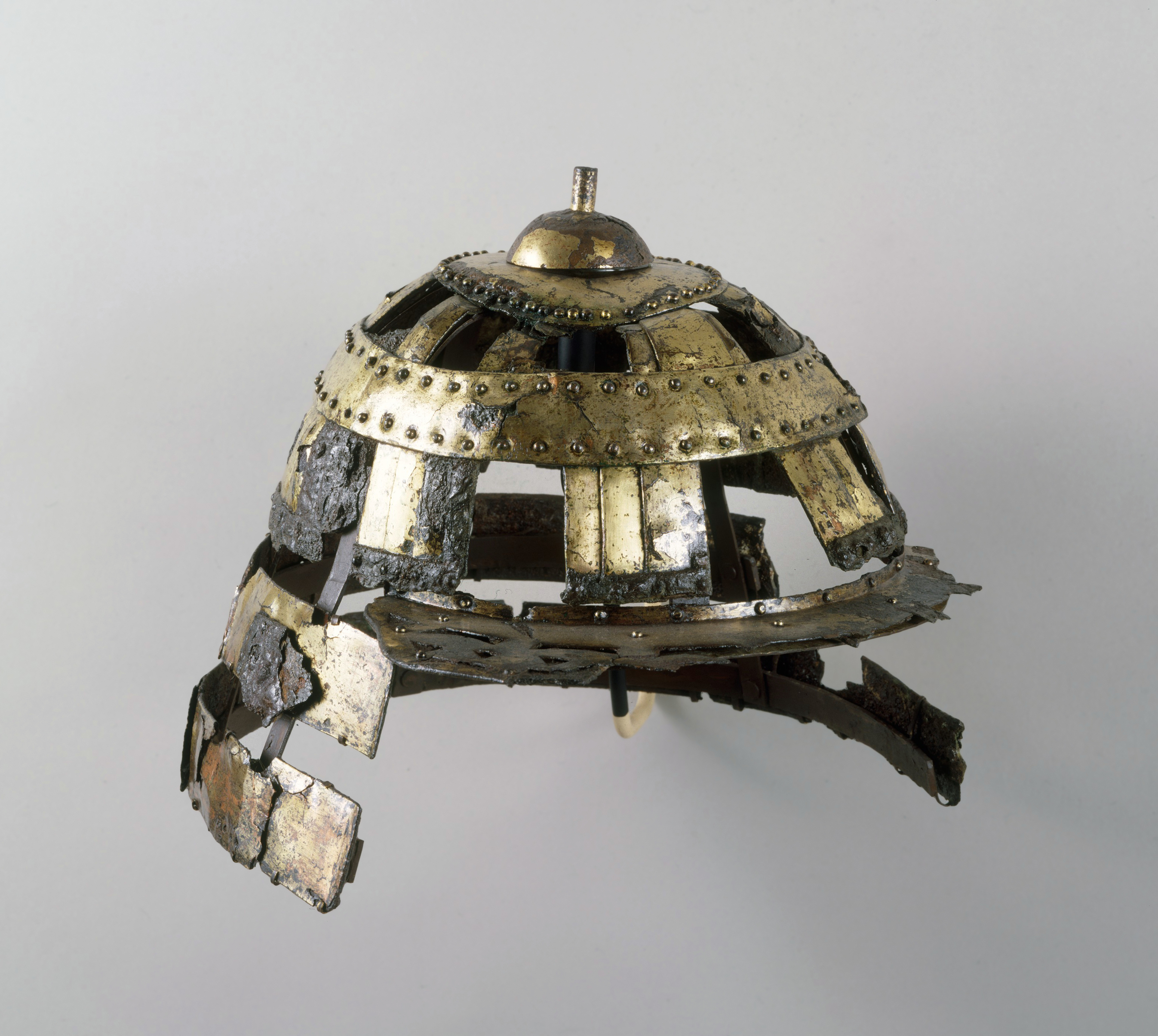
Kofun helmet, iron and gilt copper

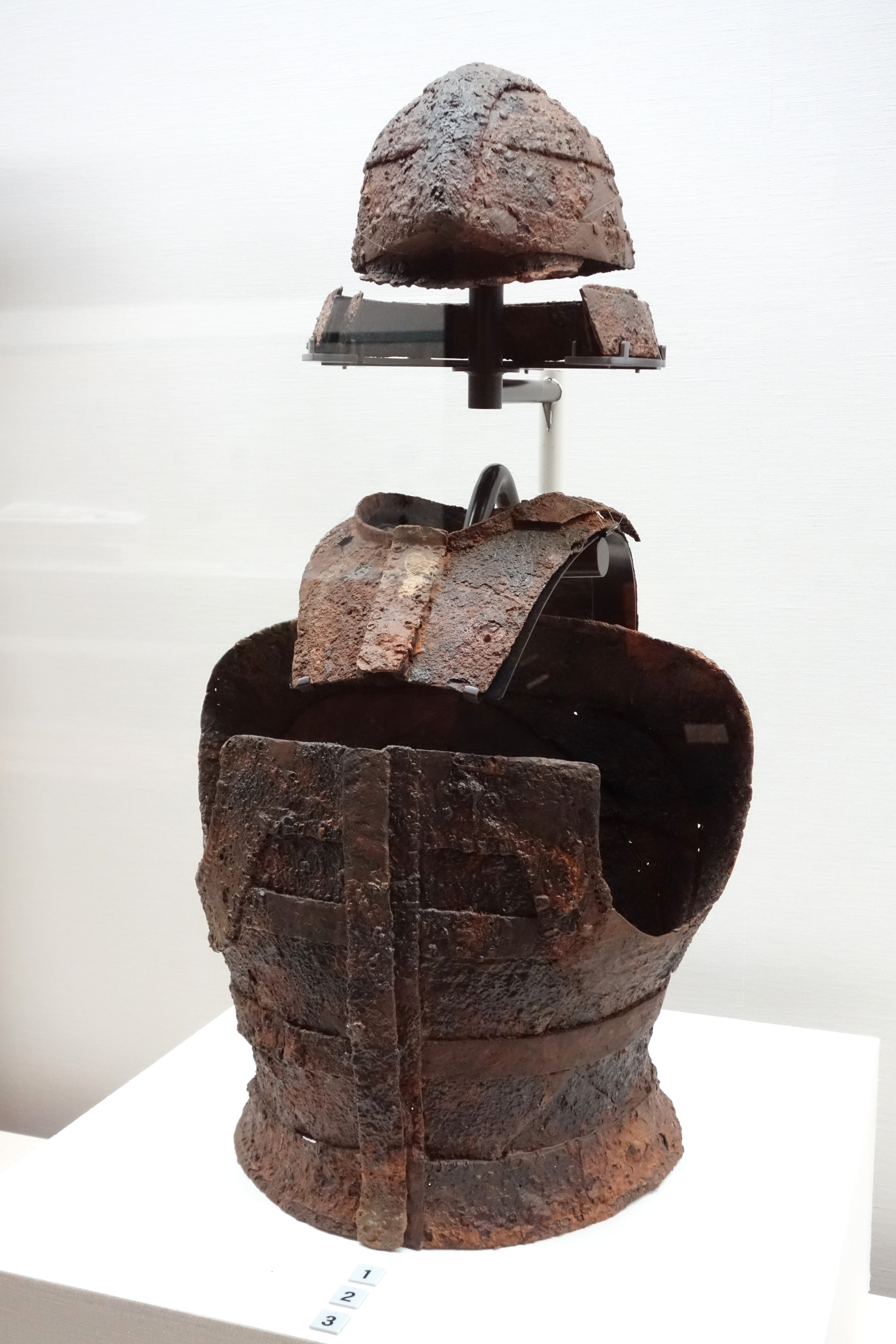
Kofun Tankō (short armor)

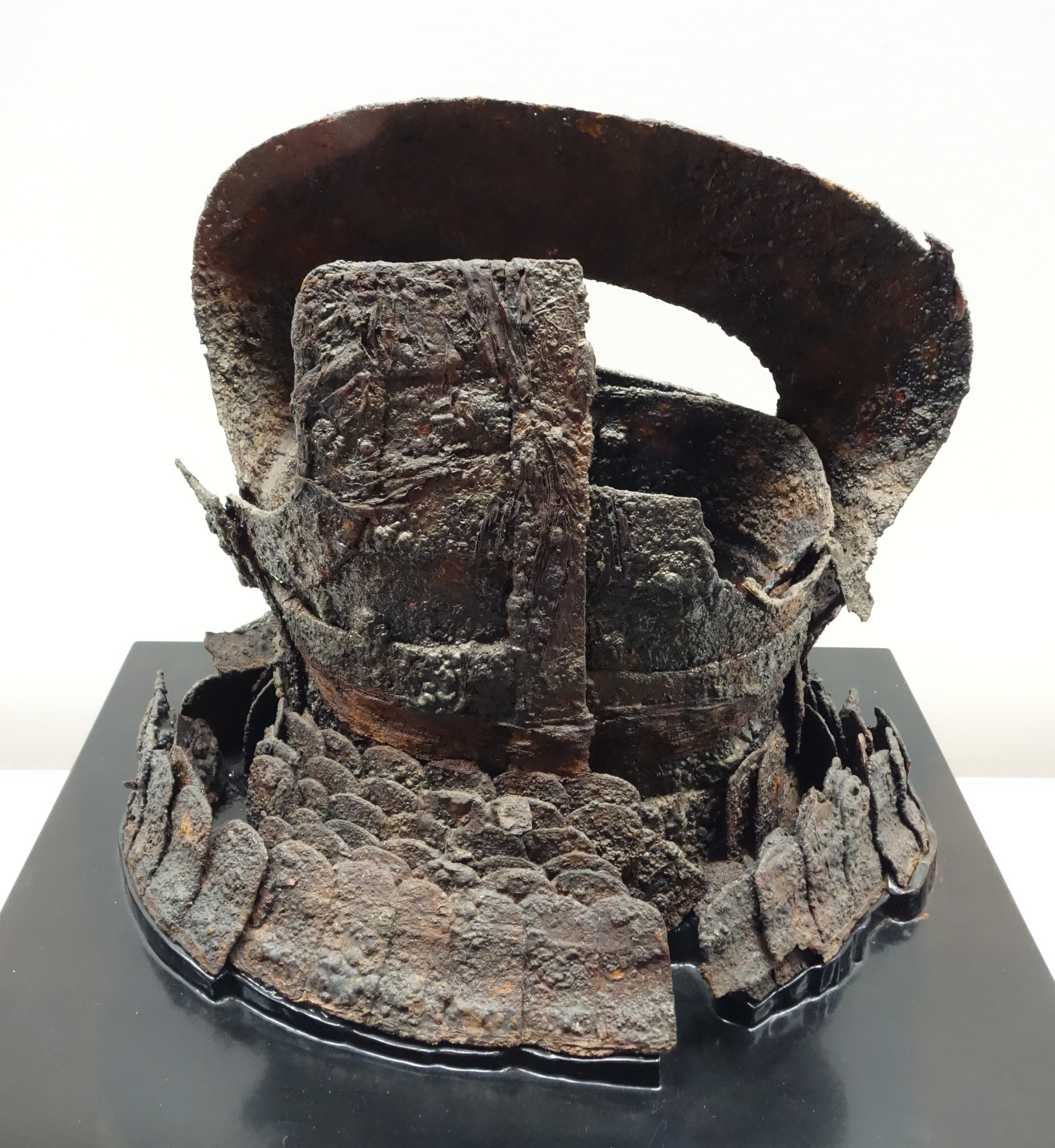
Kofun Keikō (cuirass)

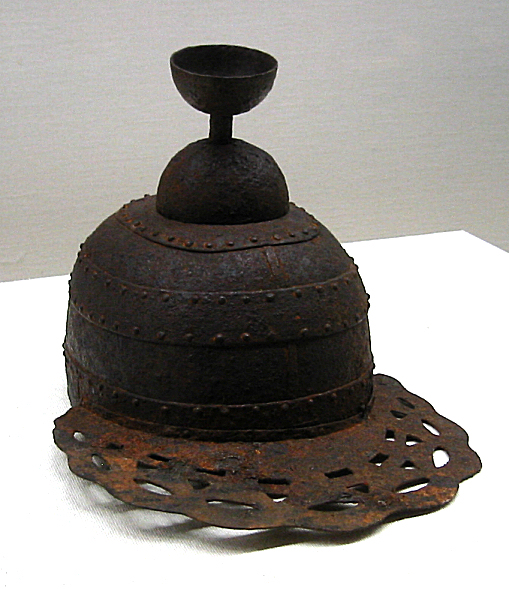
Helmet

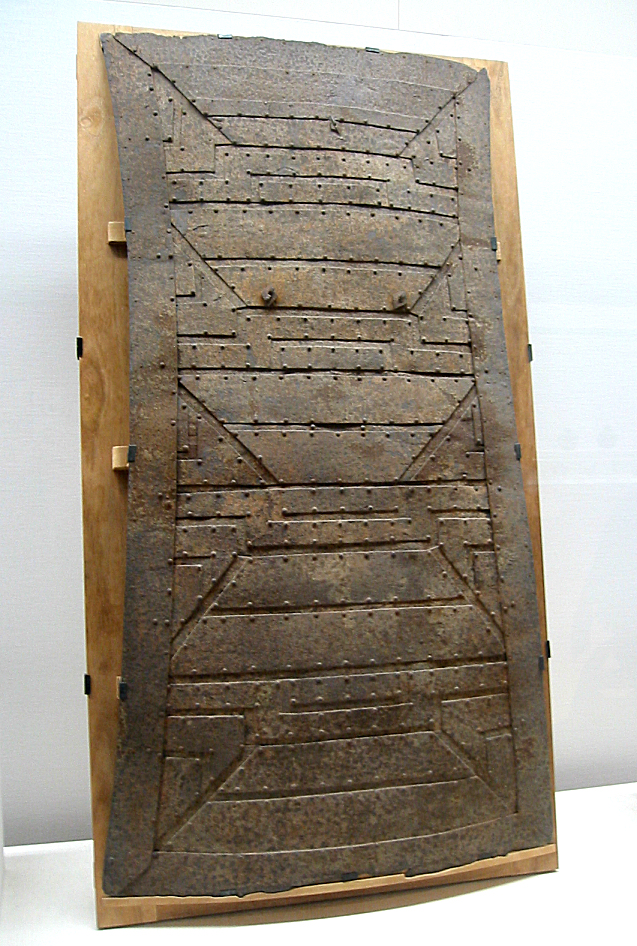
Shield

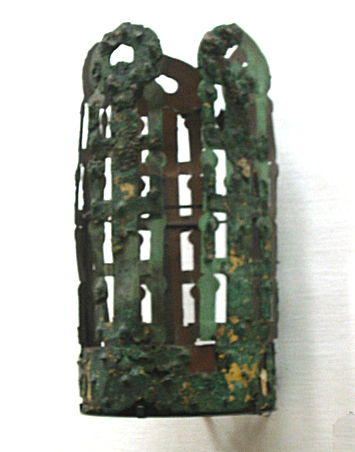
Crown

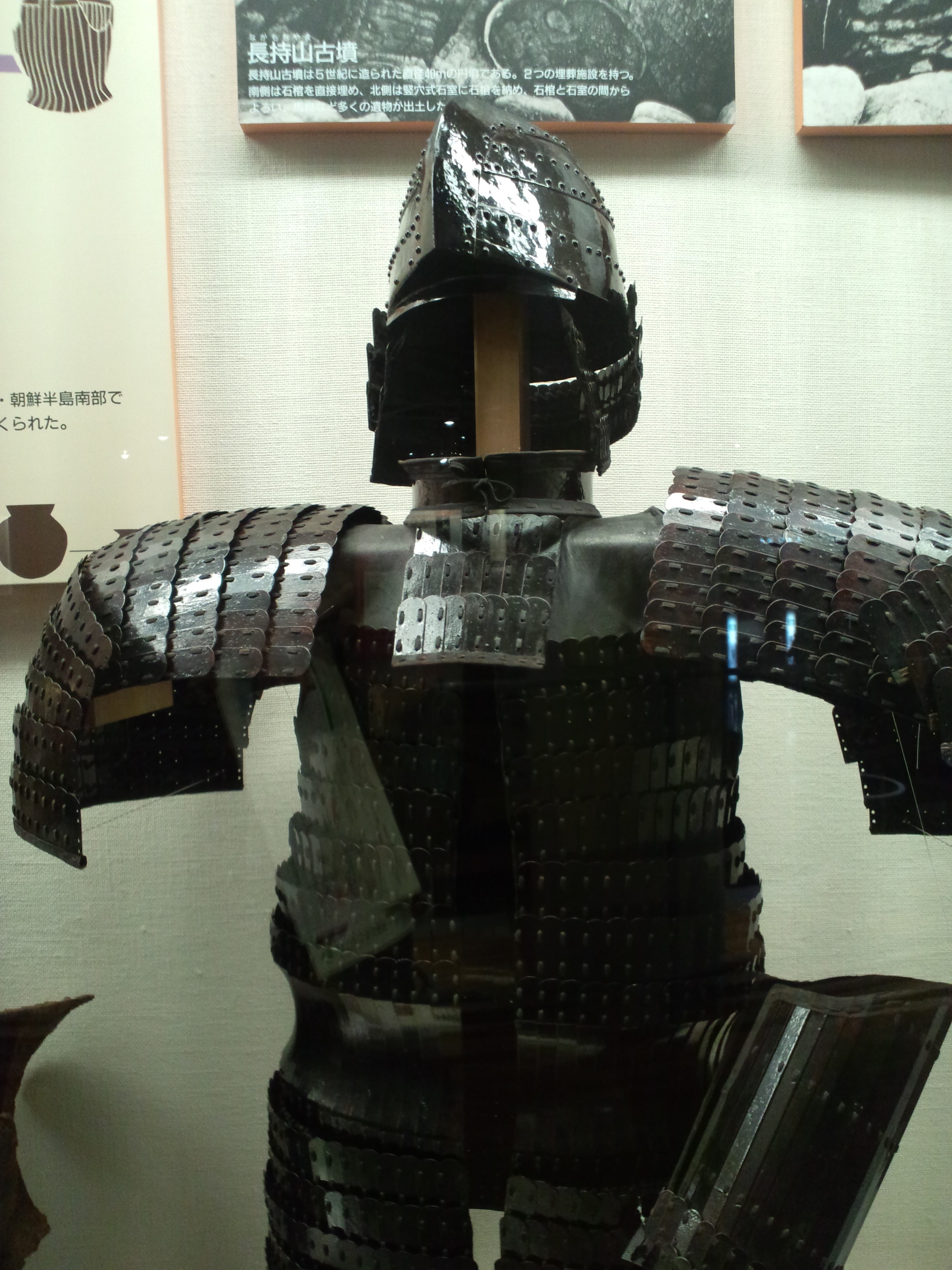
Restored Kofun period lamellar armour

== See also ==
- Japanese clans
- Kuni no miyatsuko
- Kumaso
- Kofun
- Kofun system
- Zenpokoenfun

== Sources ==
- Bogucki, Peter (1999). The Origins of Human Society. Blackwell Publishing. ISBN 1-57718-112-3.
- Farris, William Wayne (1998). Sacred Texts and Buried Treasures: Issues in the Historical Archaeology of Ancient Japan. University of Hawaiʻi Press. ISBN 0-8248-1966-7.
- Imamura, Keiji (1996). Prehistoric Japan: New Perspectives on Insular East Asia. University of Hawaii Press. ISBN 0-8248-1852-0.
- Kōzō, Yamamura; John Whitney Hall (1997). The Cambridge history of Japan. Cambridge University Press. ISBN 0-521-22354-7.
- Kurano, Kenji; Yūkichi Takeda (1958). Nihon Koten Bungaku Taikei 1: Kojiki, Norito. Iwanami Shoten. ISBN 4-00-060001-X.
- Saeki, Arikiyo (1981). Shinsen Shōjiroku no Kenkyū (Honbun hen) (in Japanese). Yoshikawa Kōbunkan. ISBN 4-642-02109-4.
- Sakamoto, Tarō; Ienaga Saburō; Inoue Mitsusada; Ōno Susumu (1967). Nihon Koten Bungaku Taikei 67: Nihon Shoki. Vol. 1. Iwanami Shoten. ISBN 4-00-060067-2.
- Seeley, Christopher (2000). A history of writing in Japan. University of Hawaiʻi Press. ISBN 0-8248-2217-X.
- Stearns, Peter N.; William Leonard Langer (2001). The Encyclopedia of World History. Houghton Mifflin Harcourt. ISBN 0-395-65237-5.
- Yamaguchi, Yoshinori; Kōnoshi Takamitsu (1997). Shinpen Nihon Koten Bungaku Zenshū 1: Kojiki. Shōgakukan. ISBN 4-09-658001-5.
- Yoshida, Takashi (1997). Nihon no tanjō (in Japanese). Iwanami Shoten. ISBN 4-00-430510-1.
- Japan

Preceded by Yayoi period	History of Japan	Succeeded by Asuka period
