= Koshibito =

Ethnic Group

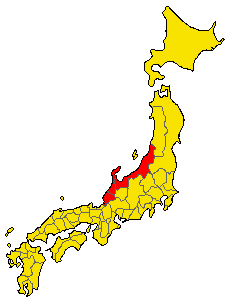
The possible area were the Koshibito tribes lived

The Koshibito (in Japanese, variously: 高志人, 古志人 or 越人, all pronounced identically) were a people of ancient Japan, believed to have lived on the southern portion of the shore of the Sea of Japan in the ancient province of Koshi during the Jōmon period.
