= Haniwa horse from Kamichūjō =

Haniwa in Tokyo National Museum

- 上中条出土埴輪馬
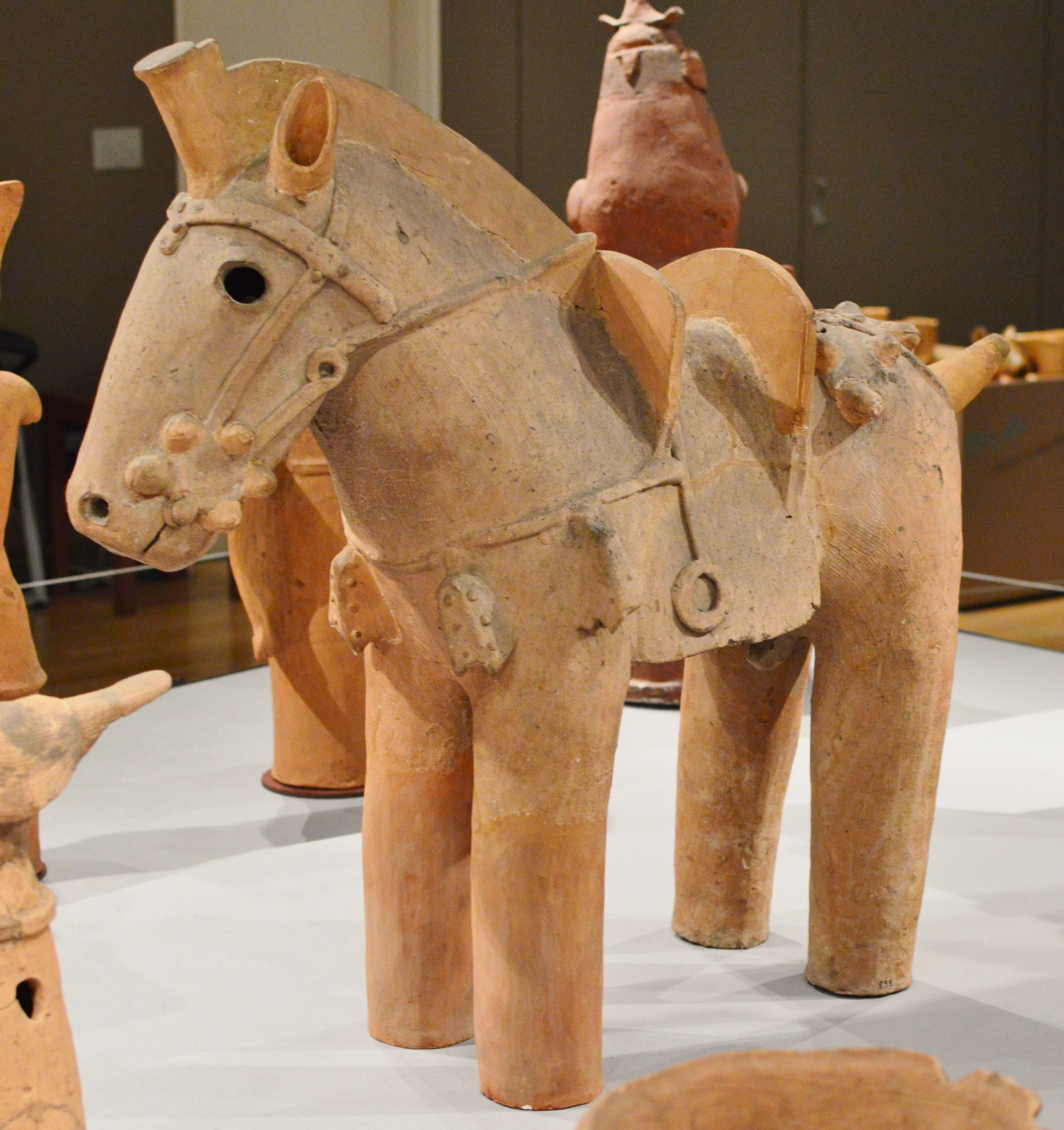
- Material: Clay (unglazed terracotta)
- Size: 87.5 by 101.5 by 36.5 centimetres (34.4 in × 40.0 in × 14.4 in)
- Created: 6th century
- Period/culture: Kofun period
- Discovered: Kamichūjō, Kumagaya, Saitama Prefecture, Japan
- Present location: Tokyo National Museum
- Registration: J-838

The haniwa horse (Japanese: 埴輪馬) from Kamichūjō (上中条) is a horse-shaped haniwa from the area of that name in Kumagaya, Saitama Prefecture, Japan. Now at Tokyo National Museum, it is of particular significance for its detailed rendering of contemporary horse tack and has been designated an Important Cultural Property.

== Context ==
Although horses feature in early Japanese mythology (namely Susanoo's rampage), horse riding as a practice appears to have been introduced to Japan from the Asian mainland in the Kofun period and to have become widespread only in the fifth century. Initially, horse tack (馬具) were also imported, with evidence for domestic production from the sixth century. With the development and spread of equestrian culture in the latter half of the fifth century and into the sixth, horse-shaped haniwa were similarly produced in volume, especially in the Kantō region. According to the University of Michigan Museum of Anthropological Archaeology, "the high value placed on horses during the Tumulus period is reflected in the elaborate trappings of this haniwa".

== Overview ==
The haniwa was most likely excavated from Chūjō Kofun Cluster in what is now the city of Kumagaya; the so-called Haniwa Warrior in Tankō Armour is understood to have been recovered from the same group of kofun. Both haniwa were designated Important Cultural Properties in 1958 and are now held at Tokyo National Museum under the ownership of the National Institutes for Cultural Heritage. Both have been dated to the first half of the sixth century, with the Chūjō Kofun Cluster thought to have been in use around the middle of the century.

Made from clay, this haniwa horse stands to a total height of 87.5 centimetres (34.4 in), measures 101.5 centimetres (40.0 in) nose to tail, and has a width or depth of some 36.5 centimetres (14.4 in). Thanks to its cylindrical legs, some 37.2 centimetres (14.6 in) long, it stands firmly and stably upon the ground. In general it is well-preserved, although the front legs, ears, mane, tail, and saddle have all seen some restoration work. Well-groomed, the mane has been brushed up into a decorative fastener at the front and the tail's hair has also been tied up. The genitalia allow its identification as a male.

== Tack ==
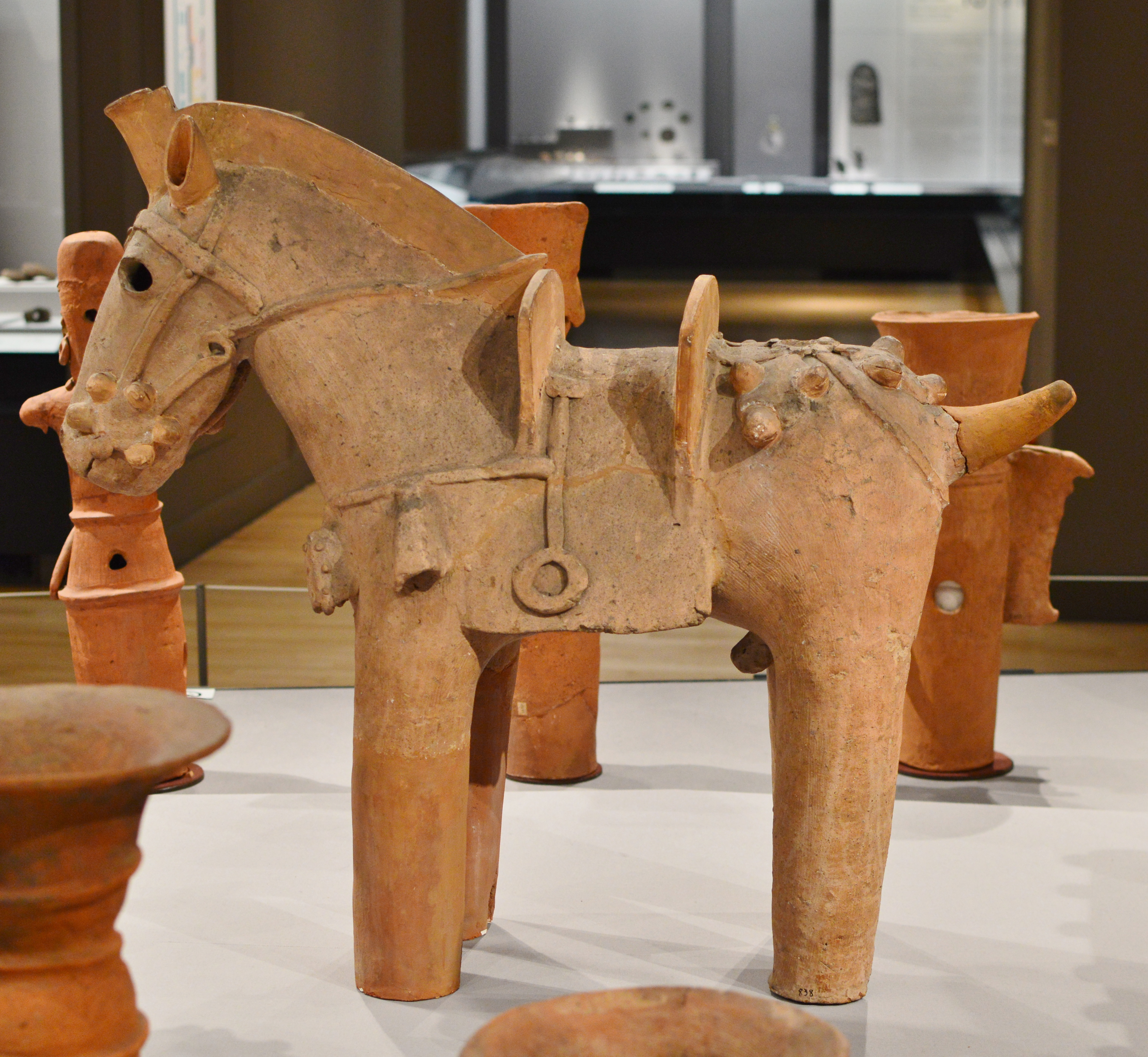
Side view of the horse

The haniwa's tack, from nose to tail, comprise the headgear, in the form of a bridle with decorative metal fittings where the straps cross—incorporating the headpiece or bit. In this case, the bit is part of a cheekpiece that contains six small bells of the type known as rei (鈴), and reins. It has a set of four horse bells, slung from the breast-strap. The saddle tree or kurabone (鞍橋) and saddle flaps or aori (障泥) cover and protect the horse's flanks. The flanks are surmounted by ring stirrups or wa-abumi (輪鐙). To the rear, the crupper or shirigai (尻繫) has pendant plum leaf-shaped decorations with triple bells attached in three directions.

According to the National Institutes for Cultural Heritage, horses so equipped would have made a "striking visual and aural impression", while symbolizing the "prestige and authority of their powerful owners".

== Gallery ==
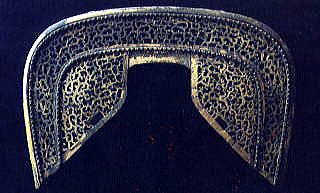
Saddle (NT) from Konda Maruyama Kofun, Furuichi Kofun Cluster, Osaka Prefecture (Konda Hachiman-gū)

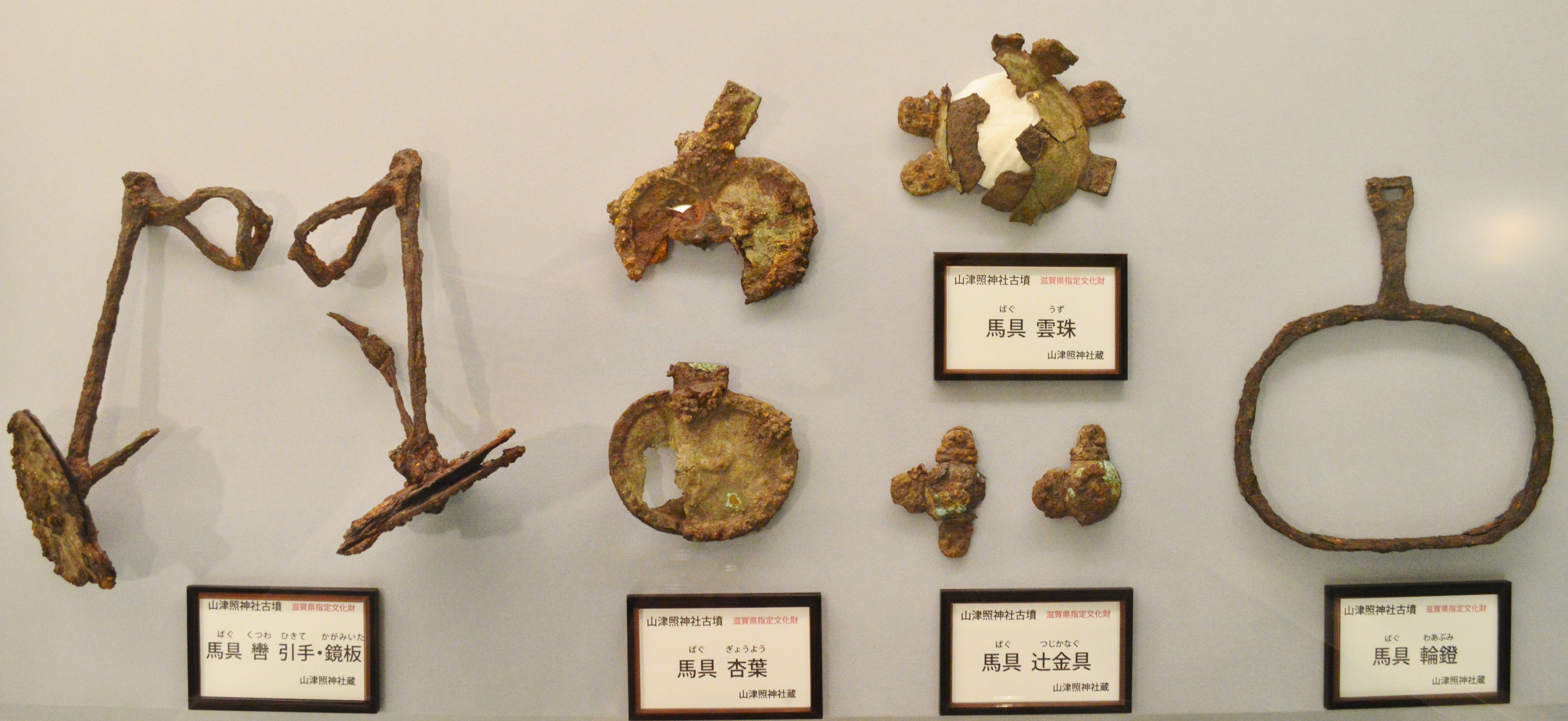
Kutsuwa bit and kagami-ita cheekpieces, gyōyō and uzu decorations, and wa-abumi ring stirrup, from Yamatsuteru Jinja Kofun, Shiga Prefecture (Shiga Prefectural Azuchi Castle Archaeological Museum)

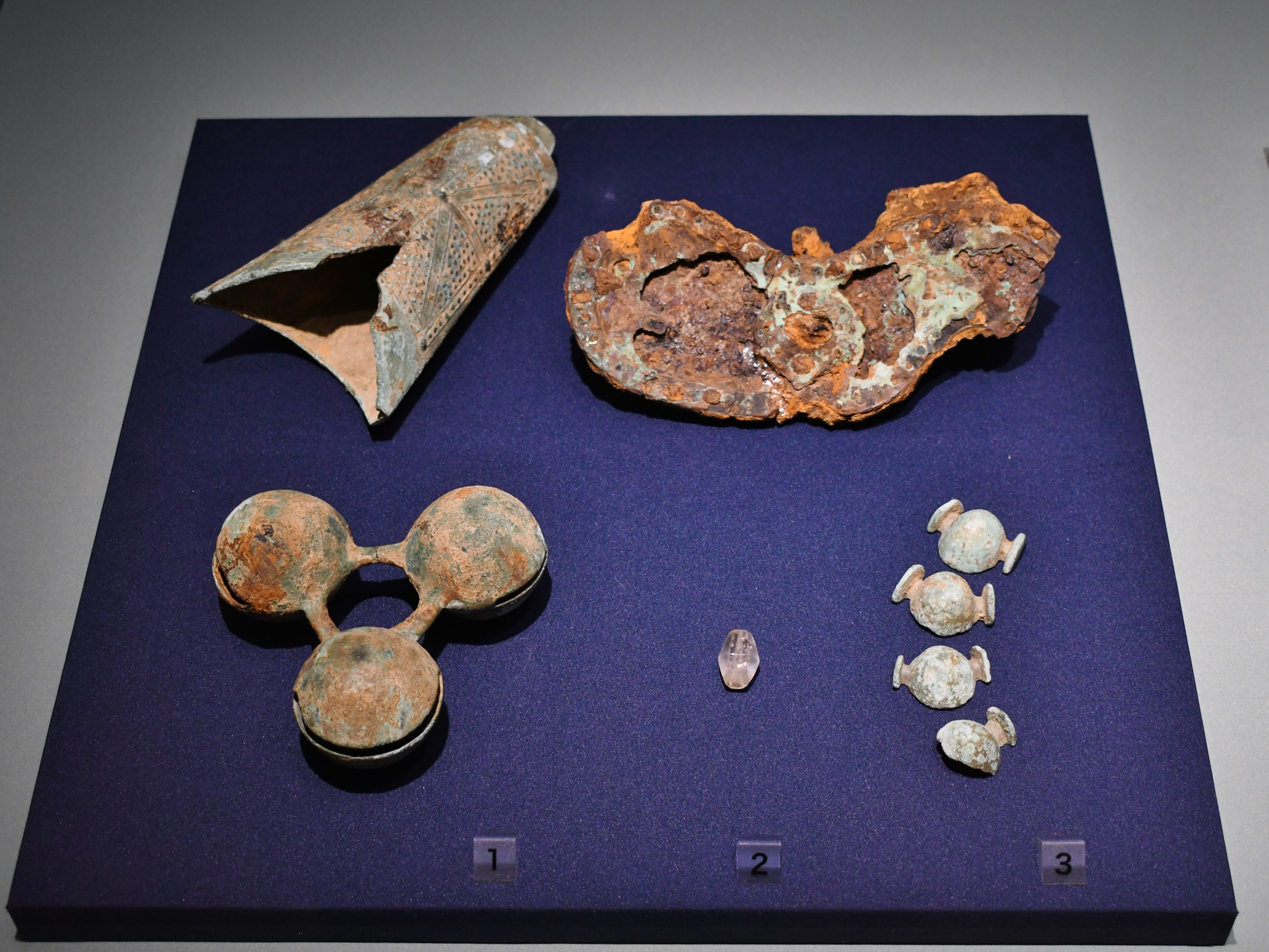
Triple rei and bataku horse bells from Menguro Kofun, Shimane Prefecture (Shimane Museum of Ancient Izumo)

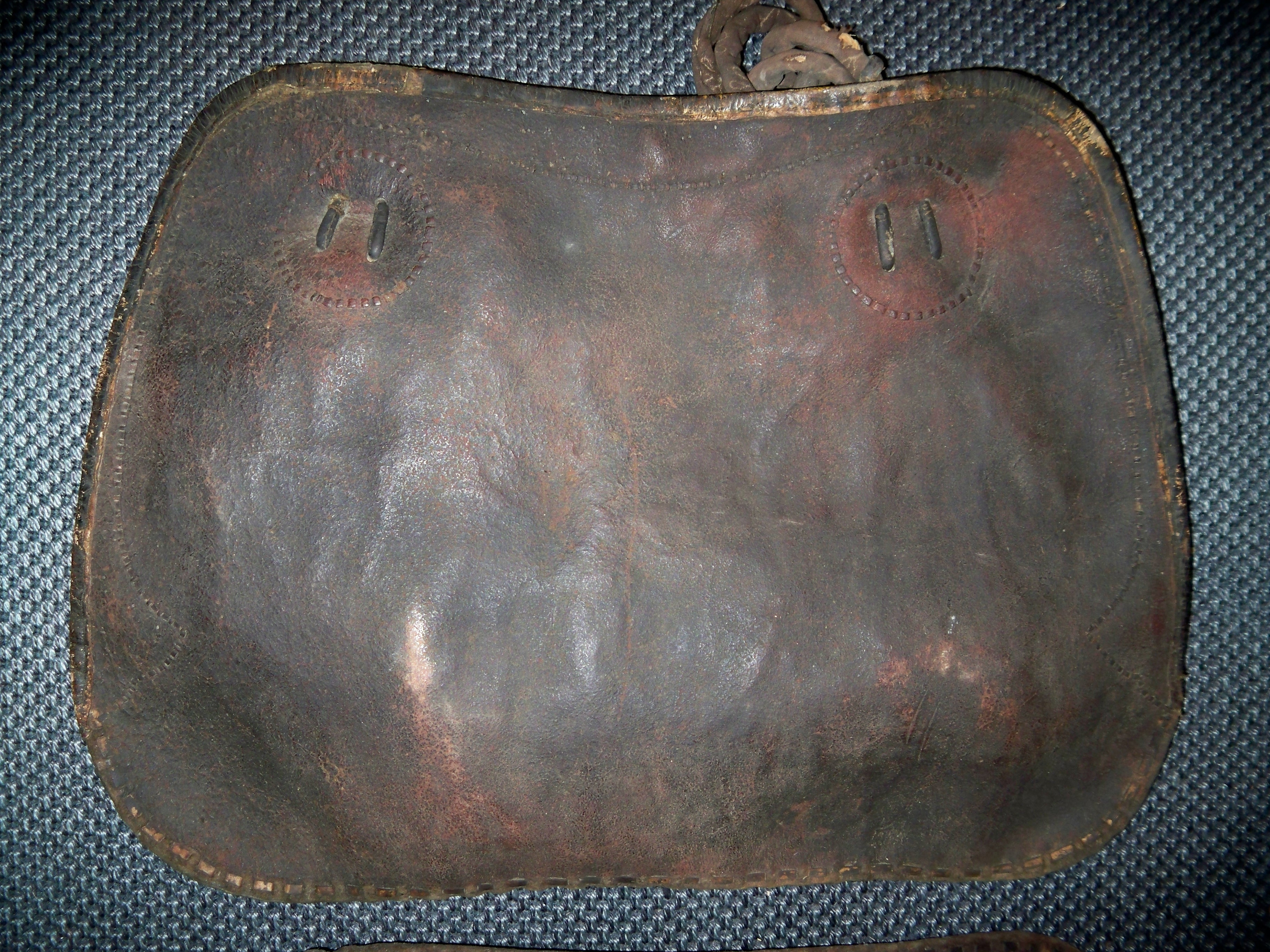
Later aori (saddle flap)

== See also ==
- Horserider Theory
- Sekijin sekiba
