= Ōtomo no Kanamura =

Japanese warrior-statesman of late Kofun period

Ōtomo no Kanamura 大伴 金村
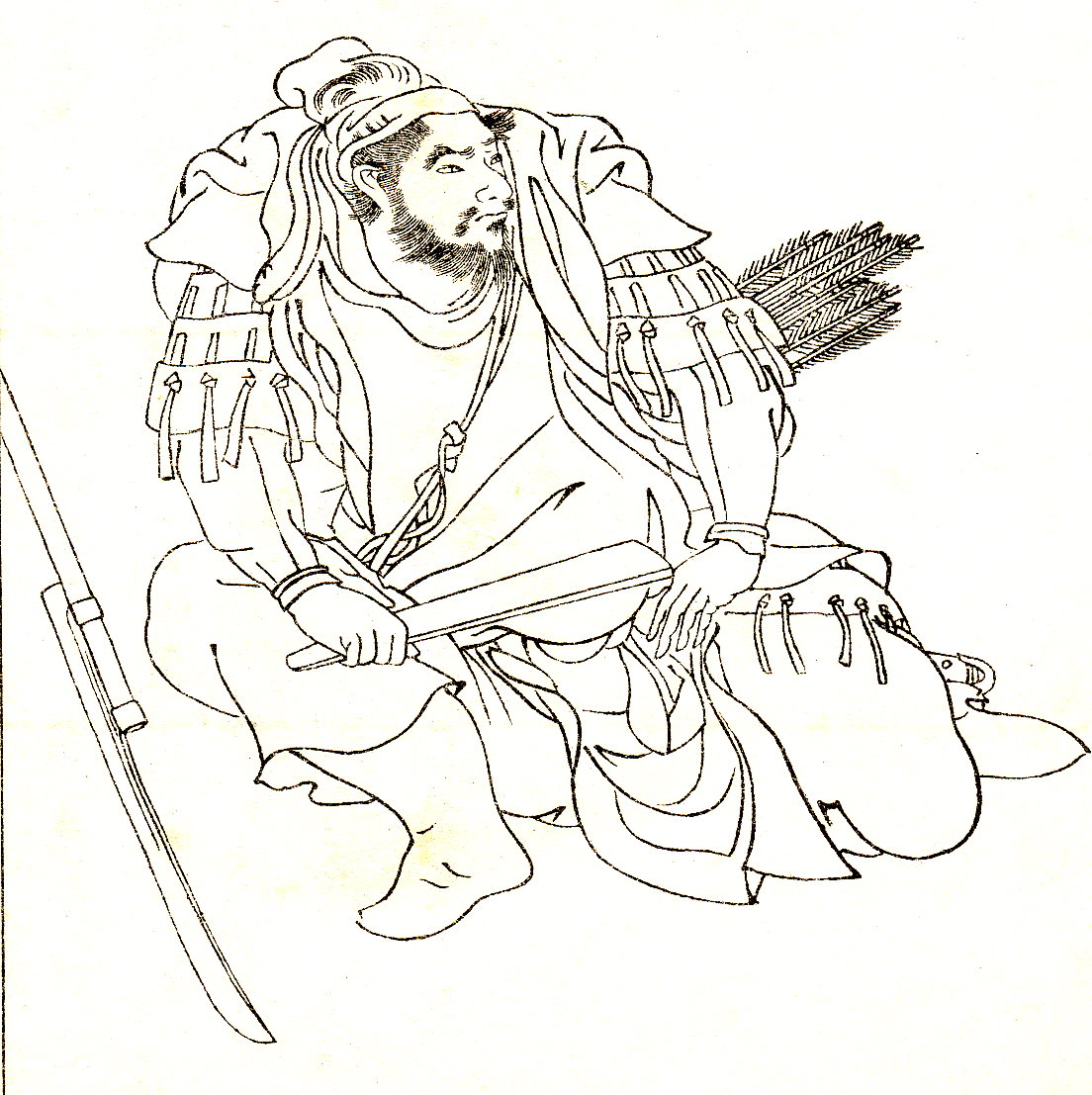
- Ōtomo no Kanamura, by Kikuchi Yōsai
- Lord(s): Emperor Ninken (until 498); Emperor Buretsu (499–507); Emperor Keitai (507–531); Emperor Ankan (531–536); Emperor Senka (536–539); Emperor Kinmei (after 539)
- Issue: 6, including Ōtomo no Satehiko
Era dates
- Kofun period
- Clan: Ōtomo

Ōtomo no Kanamura (大伴金村) was a Japanese warrior and statesman during the late Kofun period. Most of what is known of his life comes from the Kojiki and the Nihon Shoki. His clan, the Ōtomo, had been highly influential at court since the time of his grandfather Ōtomo no Muroya.

According to these sources, Kanamura was instrumental in putting down the uprising of Heguri no Matori (平群馬鳥) and in raising Emperor Buretsu to the throne. Buretsu, in gratitude, raised Kanamura to the position of Ōmuraji (a high-ranking ministerial position). He also oversaw the succession of Emperor Keitai, instead of the claimant Prince Yamatohiko, and selected Keitai's empress himself. Kanamura embraced an aggressive policy towards the kingdom of Silla (part of modern-day Korea), and advocated sending forces there; his own son Ōtomo no Satehiko led two expeditions against the Korean kingdoms. This policy eventually led to his downfall, when in 540 the Emperor Kinmei, under advice from the minister Mononobe no Okoshi, decided to refrain from direct military action against Silla. The Emperor also removed Kanamura from his position as Ōmuraji as a result.
