= Ōtomo clan (ancient) =

Japanese clan of the Yamato period

Ōtomo 大伴氏
- Members: Ōtomo no Kanamura; Ōtomo no Tabito; Ōtomo no Yakamochi; Ōtomo no Sakanoue no Iratsume; Ōtomo no Otomaro; Tomo no Yoshio

The Ōtomo clan (大伴氏, Ōtomo uji) was a Japanese aristocratic kin group (uji) of the Yamato period. The Ōtomo were known for their military strength and (along with other militarily valuable clans like the Heguri and Mononobe) supplanted the formerly dominant Katsuragi clan as the most powerful clan at the Yamato court during the fifth century.

The Ōtomo clan lost imperial favor in 540 when Emperor Kinmei sided against the advice of Ōtomo no Kanamura that a military expedition be sent against the Korean kingdom of Silla, and stripped Kanamura of the title of ōmuraji. The Ōtomo clan likely also lost Kinmei's favor because they had led the clans supporting the succession of Emperor Ankan and Emperor Senka to Emperor Keitai, while the clans supporting Kinmei's claim were led by the Soga clan. Soga clan leader Soga no Iname would become the most influential minister at Kinmei's court following Kanamura's removal in 540.
