= Koshi Province (Japan) =

Former province of Japan

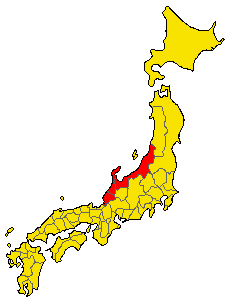
Koshi Province in map of Japan

Koshi Province (越国, Koshi no Kuni) was an ancient province or region of Japan in what is now the Hokuriku region. The region as a whole was sometimes referred to as Esshū (越州).

Koshi appears as one of the original provinces in the Nihon Shoki. In 598 AD, the residents of Koshi presented a white deer to Empress Suiko as tribute.

At the end of the 7th century, Koshi was divided into three separate provinces: Echizen, Etchū, and Echigo (as noted in the Taihō Code). The names of these provinces mean 'Inner-Koshi' (Echizen), 'Middle-Koshi' (Etchu), and 'Outer-Koshi' (Echigo), respectively, indicating their relative positions with respect to the capital region (Kinki) at the time the Ritsuryō system was enacted. Later, parts of Echizen were separated off into Noto and Kaga provinces.

== See also ==
- Koshibito
- Hokurikudō
- Hokuriku subregion
