= Tamanooya Jinja =

Shinto shrine in Hōfu, Yamaguchi Prefecture, Japan

Tamanooya Jinja 玉祖神社
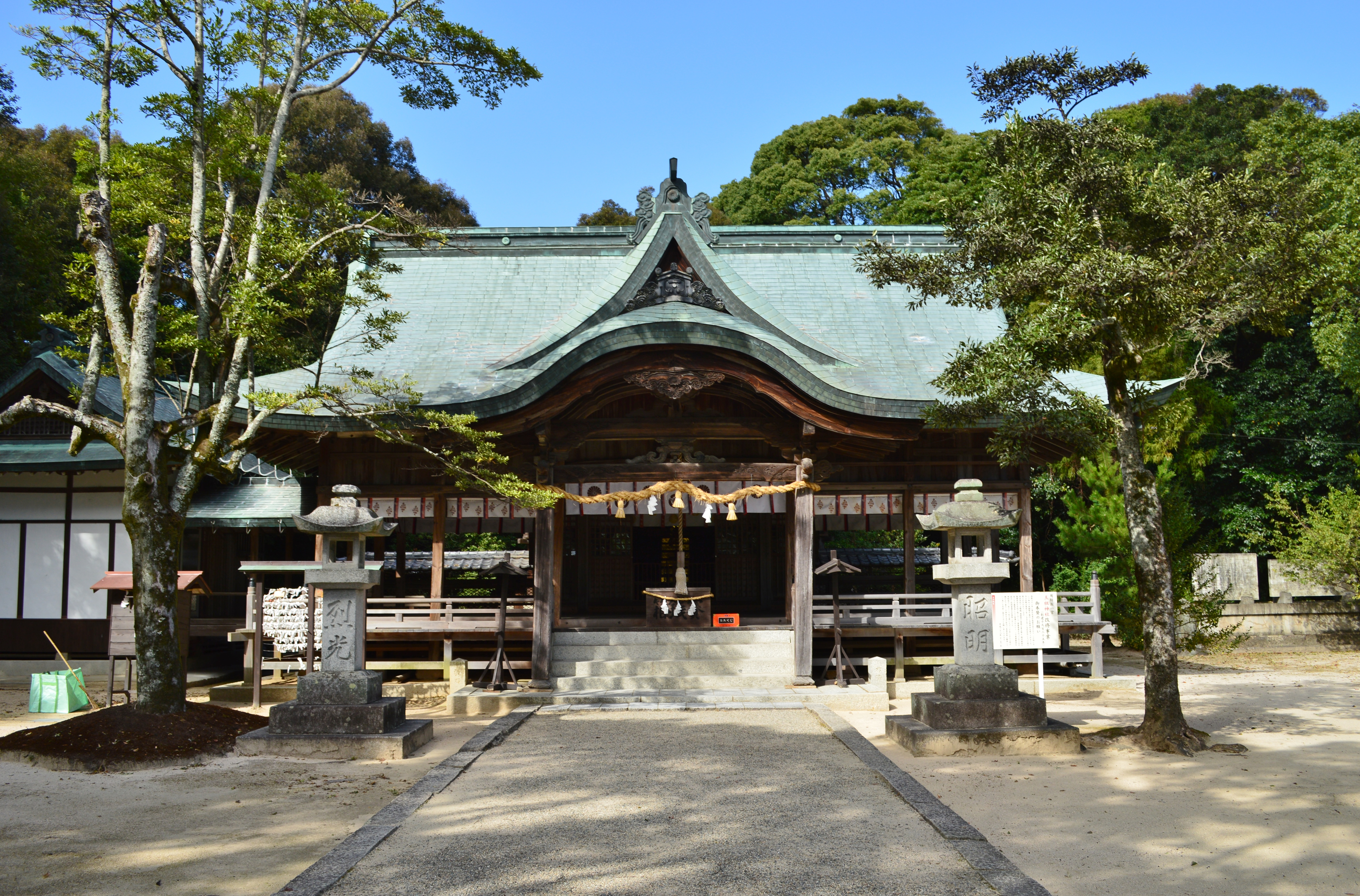
- Haiden of Tamanooya Jinja Shrine

- Location within Yamaguchi Prefecture Location within Japan

Religion
- Affiliation: Shinto
- Deity: Tamanooya-no-Mikoto; Ishikori-dome no Mikoto
- Festivals: Saturday & Sunday nearest September 25

Location
- Location: 1690 Ōaza Ōsaki, Hōfu-shi, Yamaguchi-ken 747-0065
- Interactive map of Tamanooya Jinja 玉祖神社
- Coordinates: 34°3′27.75″N 131°32′1.15″E

Architecture
- Established: unknown

Tamanooya Jinja (玉祖神社) is a Shinto shrine in the Ōsaki neighborhood of the city of Hōfu in Yamaguchi Prefecture, Japan. It is the ichinomiya of former Suō Province. The main festival of the shrine is held annually on the Saturday & Sunday nearest September 25.

== Enshrined kami ==
The kami enshrined at Tamanooya Jinja are:

- Ishikori-dome no Mikoto (石凝姥命), the goddess of mirrors and stonecutters, and creator of the Yata no Kagami.
- Tamanooya-no-Mikoto (玉祖命), the son of Ninigi and the creator of the Yasakani no Magatama.

== History ==
The origins of Tamanooya Jinja are unknown. Although there is no documentary evidence, it is believed that it began as the family shrine for a clan of Kofun period craftsmen who made magatama and tubular beads, who regarded Tamanooya-no-Mikoto as their ancestor. In the Nihon Shoki, when the legendary Emperor Keikō led an expedition to conquer the Kumaso, he was created by a clan headed by Princess Kamikashi, who offered him sacred treasures, and he prayed at the Tamanooya Jinja for victory. The shrine is mentioned in the "Nihon Sandai Jitsuroku" and Engishiki records from the early Heian period, and was regarded as the ichinomiya of the province from this time.

During the Kamakura period, the monk Chōgen who visited the Saba River basin to procure materials for the reconstruction of reconstruction of Tōdai-ji and from March 1186 the province donated substantial portion of its revenues to the project. When the reconstruction was completed in 1195, Chōgen rebuilt the Tamanooya Jinja as a gesture of thanksgiving, and the shrine has preserved the List of Treasures of the Suō Province Ichinomiya Reconstruction (周防国一宮造替神殿宝物等目録, Suō koku ichinomiya Zōtai shinden takaramono-tō mokuroku) written by Chōgen listing the work accomplished. This document is noteworthy as the most credible example of Chōgen's handwriting and is a National Important Cultural Property.

During the Meiji period era of State Shinto, the shrine was rated as an Imperial shrine, 2nd rank (国幣中社, kokuhei-chūsha) under the Modern system of ranked Shinto Shrines

The shrine is located a 45-minute walk from Hōfu Station on the JR West Sanyō Main Line.

== Gallery ==
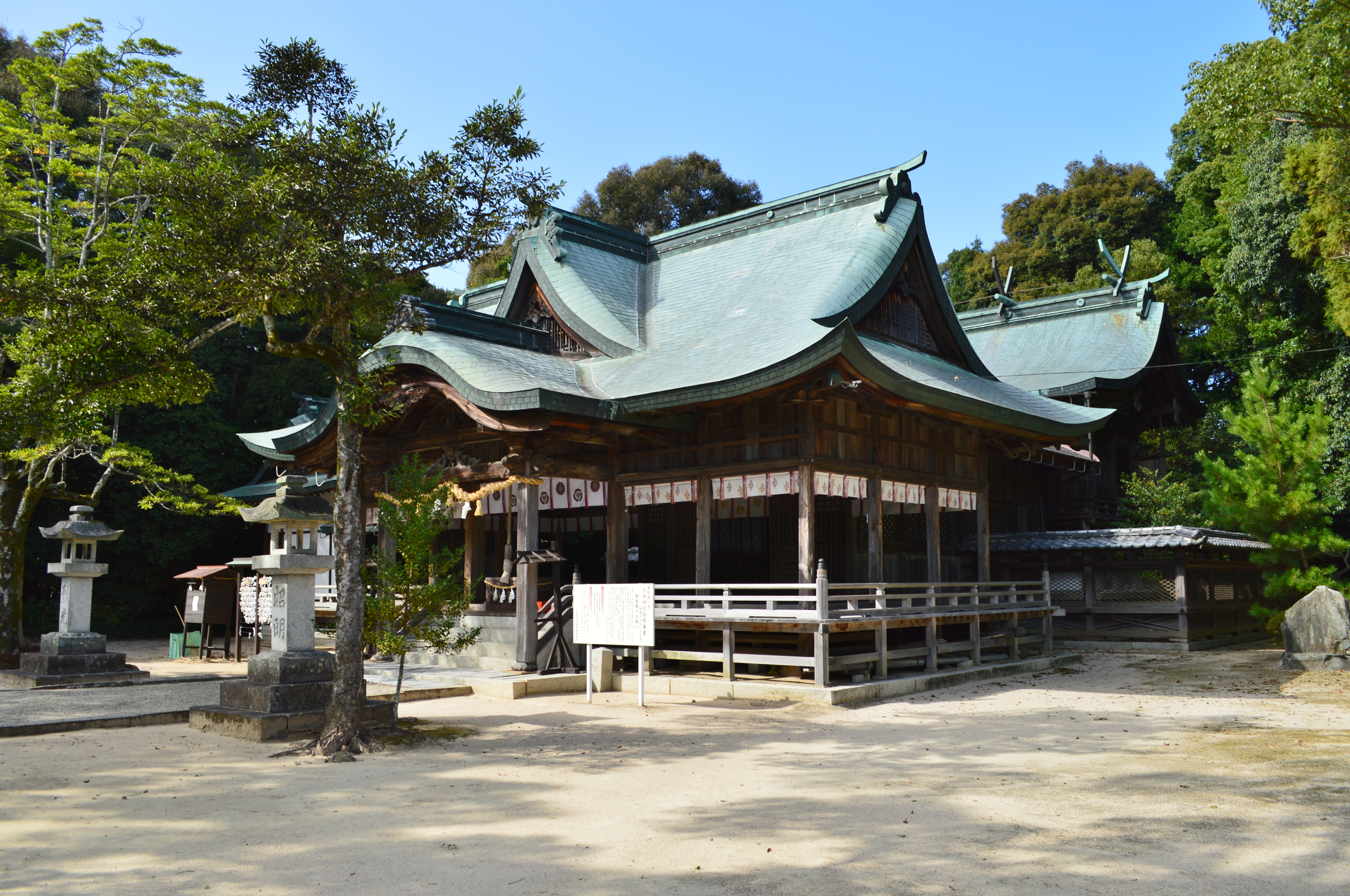
Shaden

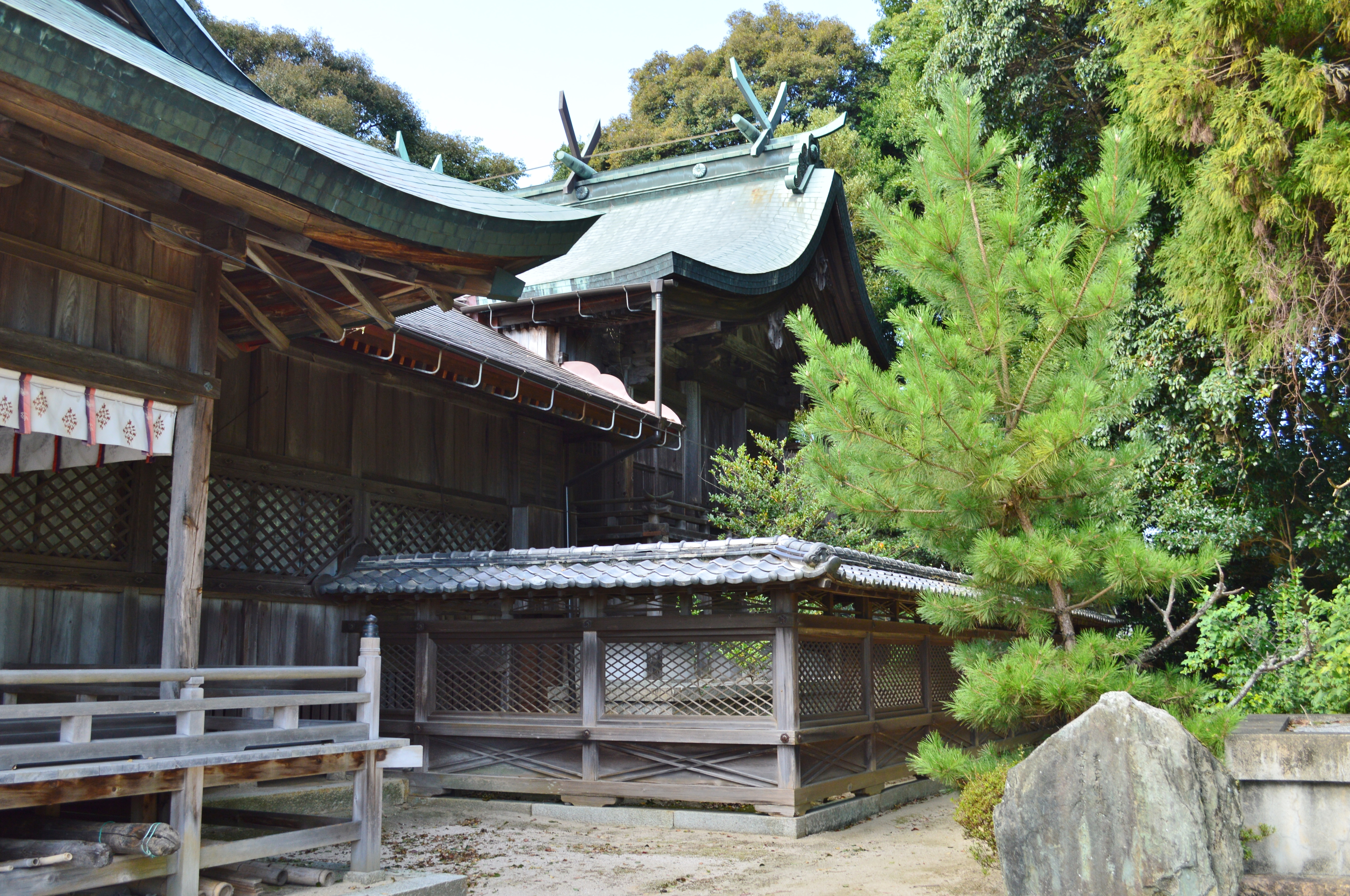
Honden

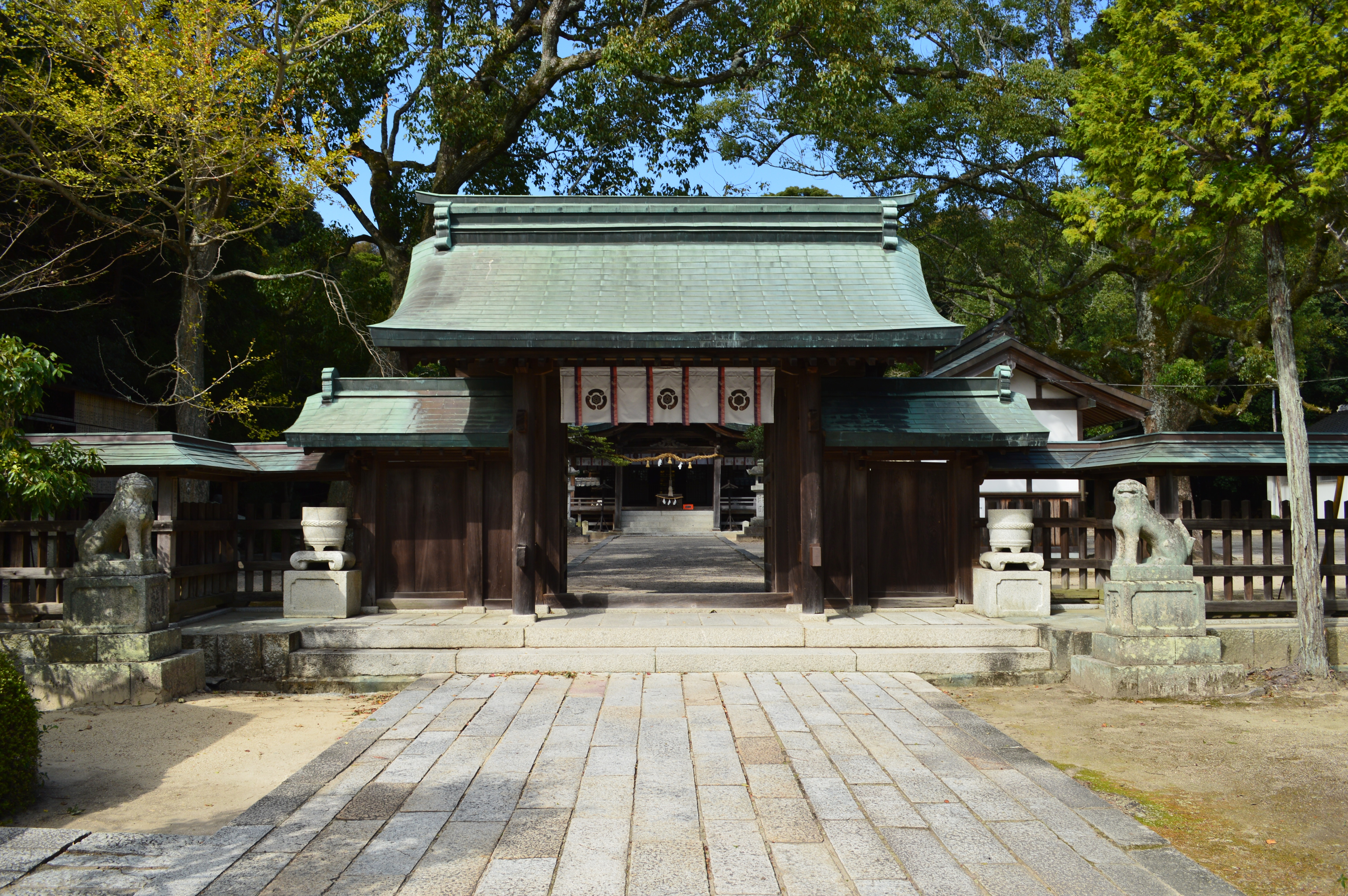
Gate

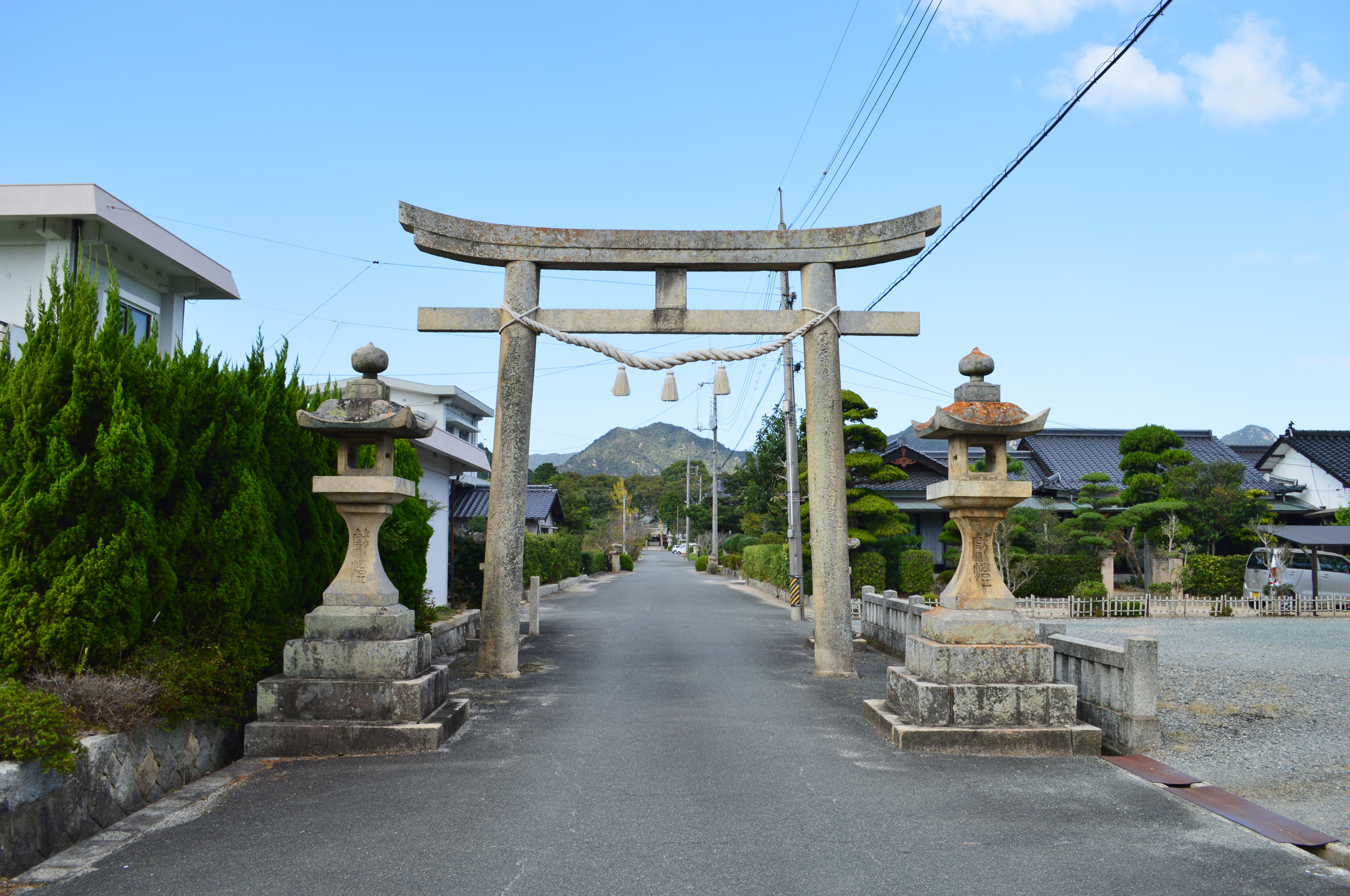
Ichi-no-Torii

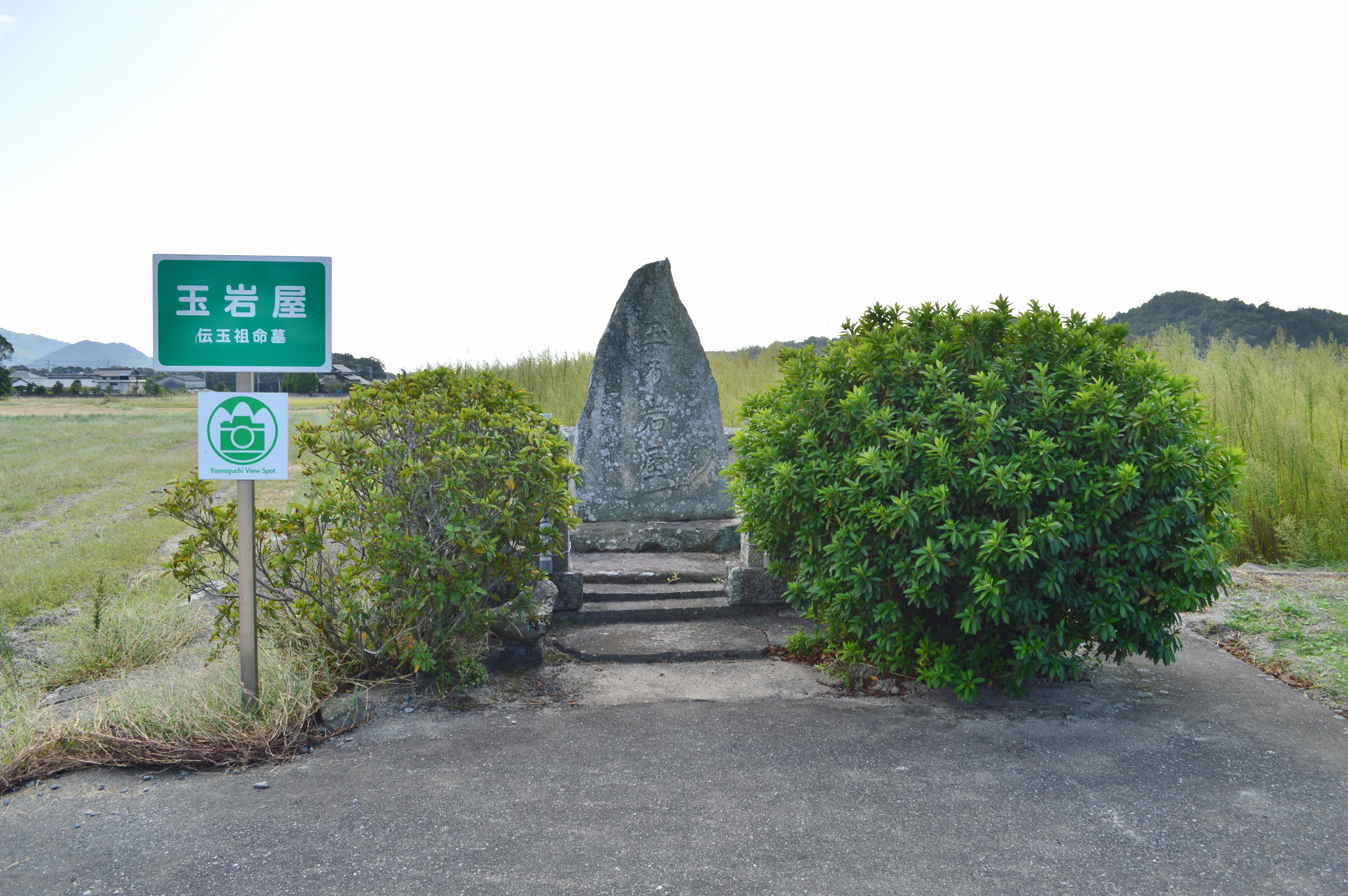
Tama-no-iwaya

== Cultural Properties ==
=== National Important Cultural Properties ===
- List of treasures of the reconstructed Suō Ichinomiya (周防国一宮造替神殿宝物等目録), Kamakura period (1195)

=== National Intangible Folk Cultural Properties ===
- Fortune-teller Sumo at Tamanooya Jinja (玉祖神社の占手相撲), This event takes place on the night before the annual festival at Tamanooya Jinja, and is also known as Night Sumo or Fortune Telling Ceremony. It is performed by the hereditary Miyatsukicho (head priest) and the event organizer on the approach to the shrine between the shrine gate and the second torii gate. Two event organizers, naked but wearing only loincloths, face each other and perform a set number of designated actions.

== See also ==
- Ichinomiya
- List of Shinto shrines
