= Totoribe no Yorozu =

Japanese warrior of the Asuka period

- 捕鳥部 万
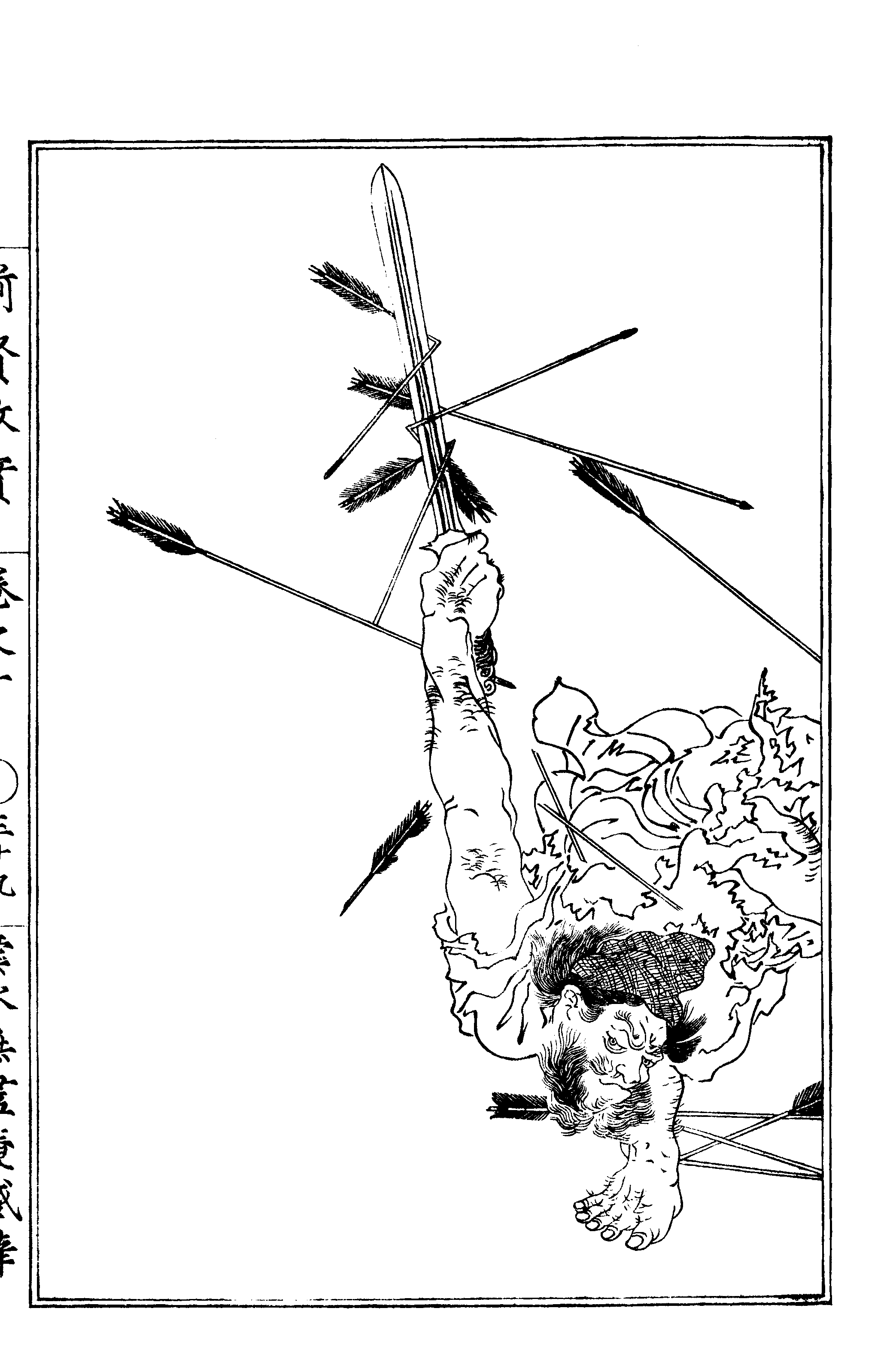
- Totoribe no Yorozu wielding a tsurugi, depicted by Kikuchi Yōsai

Personal details
- Born: Unknown Kawachi Province, Japan
- Died: July, 587 Izumi Province, Japan

Totoribe no Yorozu (捕鳥部 万; died 587) was a Japanese warrior of the Asuka period. He was a retainer of Mononobe no Moriya.

== Biography ==
The Totoribe were a shinabe clan of bird-hunters. Yorozu was likely a member of the Kawachi branch of the Totoribe clan.

During the Soga–Mononobe conflict, Yorozu was among the Shinto loyalists who fought against the pro-Buddhist faction led by Soga no Umako. When he learned that his lord Moriya had been defeated by Umako's forces, Yorozu escaped into the mountains near Arimakamura in Izumi Province.

The Nihon Shoki describes the scene that played out once Yorozu was cornered in a bamboo grove by Imperial Guard (衛士) forces in league with Umako. Yorozu used a system of ropes to rattle bamboo in order to confuse his pursuers as to his location within the grove, and killed a number of men with his bow and arrow. Surrounded, he said:

"Though I have demonstrated nothing but valor as a shield for His Majesty, I have, without adequate explanation, been forced into a desperate situation such as this. If any man will tell me whether I am to be imprisoned or killed, let him step forward."

Yorozu was then struck in the knee with an arrow, but he pulled it out and continued to defend himself, killing about 30 more. After his sword was broken and bowstring snapped, he threw away his weapons and stabbed himself in the neck with a dagger.
