= Tamanooya-no-Mikoto =

Shinto god of magatama

- God of Magatama
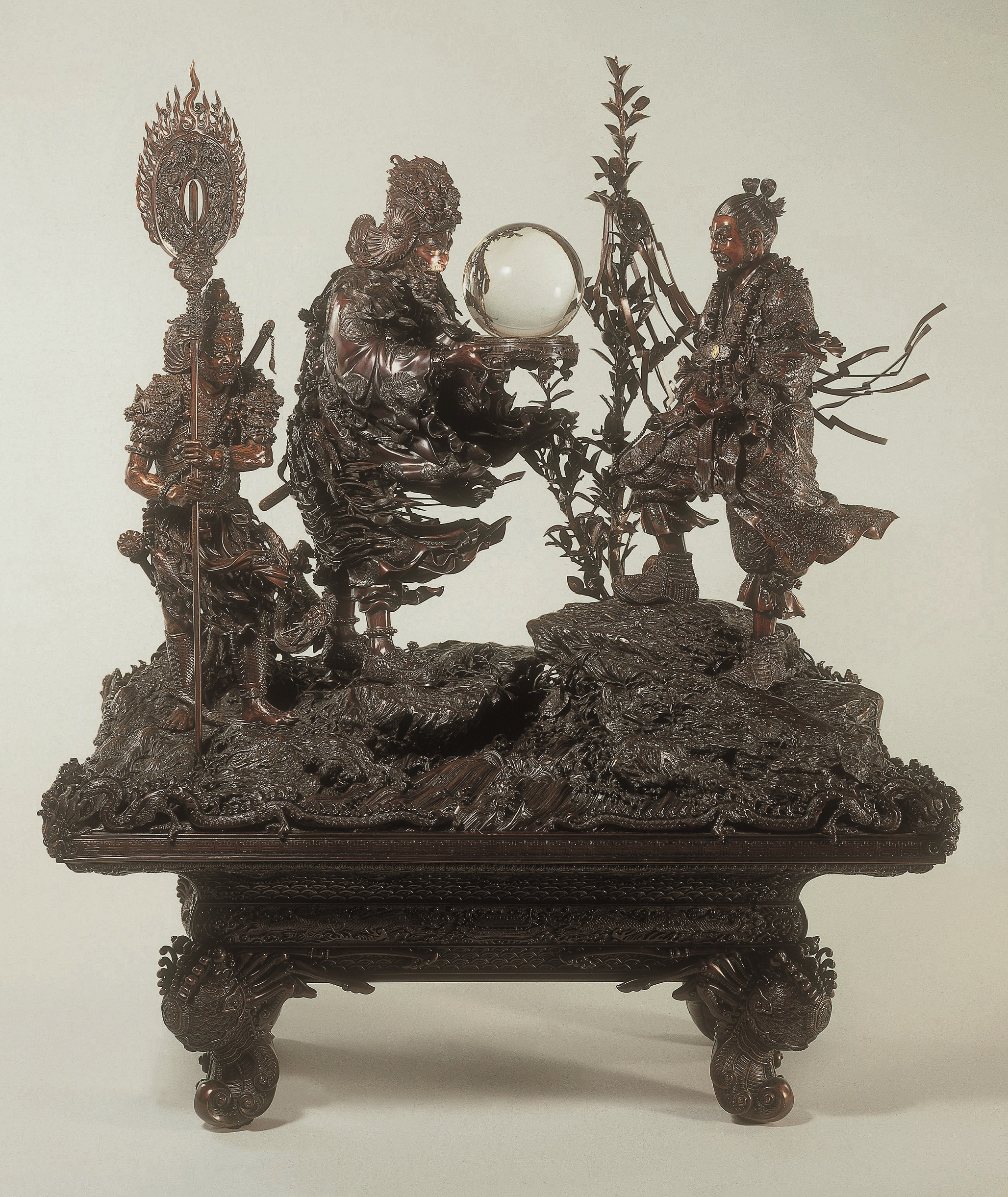

Genealogy
- Parents: Ninigi (father); Konohanasakuya-hime (mother)
- Siblings: Hoderi; Hosuseri; Hoori; Hikohohodemi

Tamanooya-no-Mikoto (玉祖命), also known as Tamanoya, is a kami from Japanese mythology.

== Mythology ==
Tamanooya is believed to be the creator of Yasakani no Magatama, one of the three imperial regalia of Japan - commonly referred to as the “Jewel” (along with the sword and the mirror).

He was one of the principle gods involved in the plan to lure Amaterasu from the cave that she hid herself in. The jewel was hung outside to lure her outside.

Tama-no-iwaya is believed to be the grave for the kami, and he is venerated at Tamanooya-jinja in Yamaguchi but is not venerated at any kampeisha.

== Family ==
The Nihon Shoki states that he was the son of Ninigi, while the Shinsen Shōjiroku says he was the grandson of Takamimusubi. He is also viewed as the ancestral kami of the Shinabe clan.

== Names ==
A list of names he goes by:

- Amenoakarutama
- Ama no akarutama
- Haakaru tama
- Kushiakarutama no kami
- Tama no oya
- Tamanoya no mikoto
- Toyotama
