= Soga–Mononobe conflict =

Japanese conflict (552 AD–587 AD)

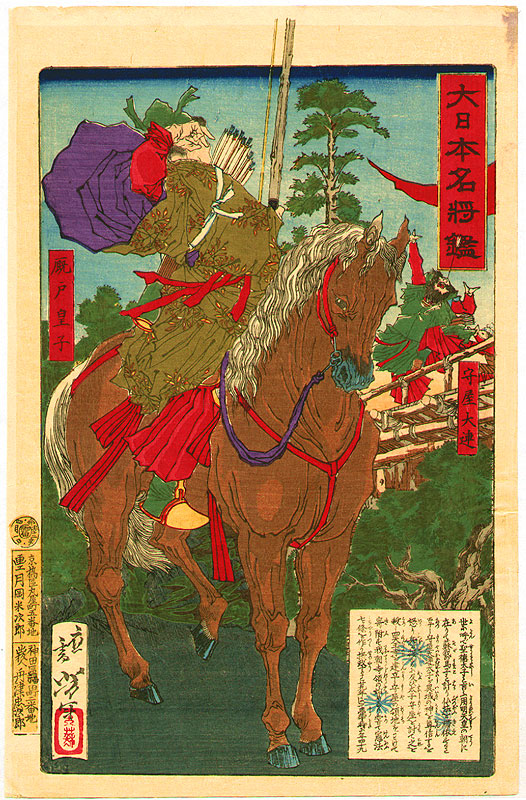
- Ukiyo-e by Yoshitoshi depicting Prince Shōtoku slaying Mononobe no Moriya for heresy against Buddhism
| Date | 552 AD – 587 AD |
| Location | Japan |
| Result | Soga victory |

Belligerents
| Soga clan Ōtomo clan | Mononobe clan Nakatomi clan |

Commanders and leaders
| Soga no Iname; Soga no Umako; Prince Shōtoku | Mononobe no Okoshi; Mononobe no Moriya †; Totoribe no Yorozu † |

Strength
| Greater numbers than the Mononobe | Unknown |

The Soga–Mononobe conflict, was a political and military dispute that took place in Japan during the Asuka period between the pro-Shinto Mononobe clan, led by Mononobe no Okoshi and Mononobe no Moriya, and the pro-Buddhist Soga clan, led by Soga no Iname and his son Soga no Umako, which would eventually emerge victorious. The military component of the conflict which broke out in the year 587 is known in Japanese as the Teibi no ran (丁未の乱; lit. "Conflict of Teibi or Teibi Rebellion/War").

== Background ==
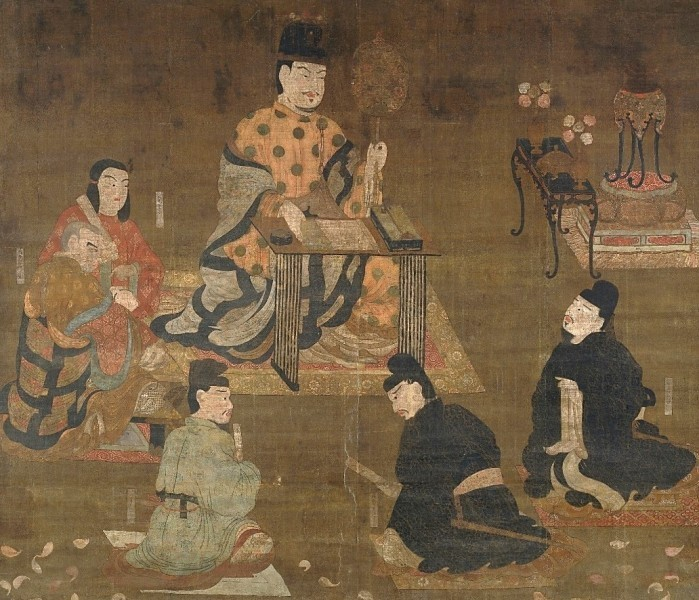
Prince Shotoku lecturing court nobles (including Ono no Imoko and Soga no Umako) on the Shoman Sūtra, 13th century depiction

The Soga clan had risen to prominence under Emperor Kinmei, with Soga no Iname becoming the first Soga to hold the title (kabane) of ōomi at the imperial court. Iname married two of his daughters to Kinmei, but died before the selection of Kinmei's non-Soga son Emperor Bidatsu as the imperial successor. Bidatsu's first empress was not a member of the Soga clan, but his second empress (the future Empress Suiko) was. Bidatsu's death led to a succession dispute among supporters of Prince Oshisako (the son of Bidatsu by his first wife), Prince Takeda (son of Bidatsu by his second wife), and Bidatsu's half-brother Prince Ōe (son of Kinmei by Soga no Kitashihime). Prince Oshisako had apparently been named crown prince by Emperor Bidatsu and had the support of the Mononobe clan, while the Soga clan under Soga no Umako supported the claim of Prince Ōe. The succession struggle turned violent after Ōomi Soga no Umako and Ōmuraji Motonobe no Moriya exchanged insults at the temporary interment ceremony for Emperor Bidatsu. The Soga clan was victorious and Prince Ōe was enthroned as Emperor Yomei.

Soga no Umako continued to serve as ōomi under Emperor Yomei, and Yomei's wife was another member of the Soga clan who gave birth to four sons, including Prince Shōtoku. The Soga–Mononobe conflict resurfaced during the succession crisis following Yomei's death, with the Soga once again victorious at the Battle of Mount Shigi, solidifying the clan's influential position at the imperial court.

== Battle at Mount Shigi ==
Takeshi Umehara notes that some ancient and medieval accounts say that the decisive battle took place in July of 587 near Mount Shigi.^{[A]}

Between July 1 and 2 the Soga are said to have been defeated in a series of engagements with the Mononobe, who, according to the Nihon Shoki, employed a type of fortification called an inaki, a palisade constructed from bundles of rice plants.

The Soga gradually retreated westward and by July 3 the demoralized Soga troops had finally concentrated in the area between Mount Shigi and Mount Ikoma. Legend has it that at this point Prince Shōtoku of the Soga cut down a sacred nurude tree, fashioned it into an image of the Four Heavenly Kings of Buddhism, and placed it on his forehead. Shōtoku and Soga no Umako then both openly vowed to build a temple to the Four Heavenly Kings should they be victorious in the battle, which reenergized their men prior to the final confrontation. In this final battle the turning point came when a Soga archer, named by the Nihon Shoki as one Tomi no Obito Ichii, fired the arrow which killed Mononobe clan leader Mononobe no Moriya, after which his forces were quickly routed.

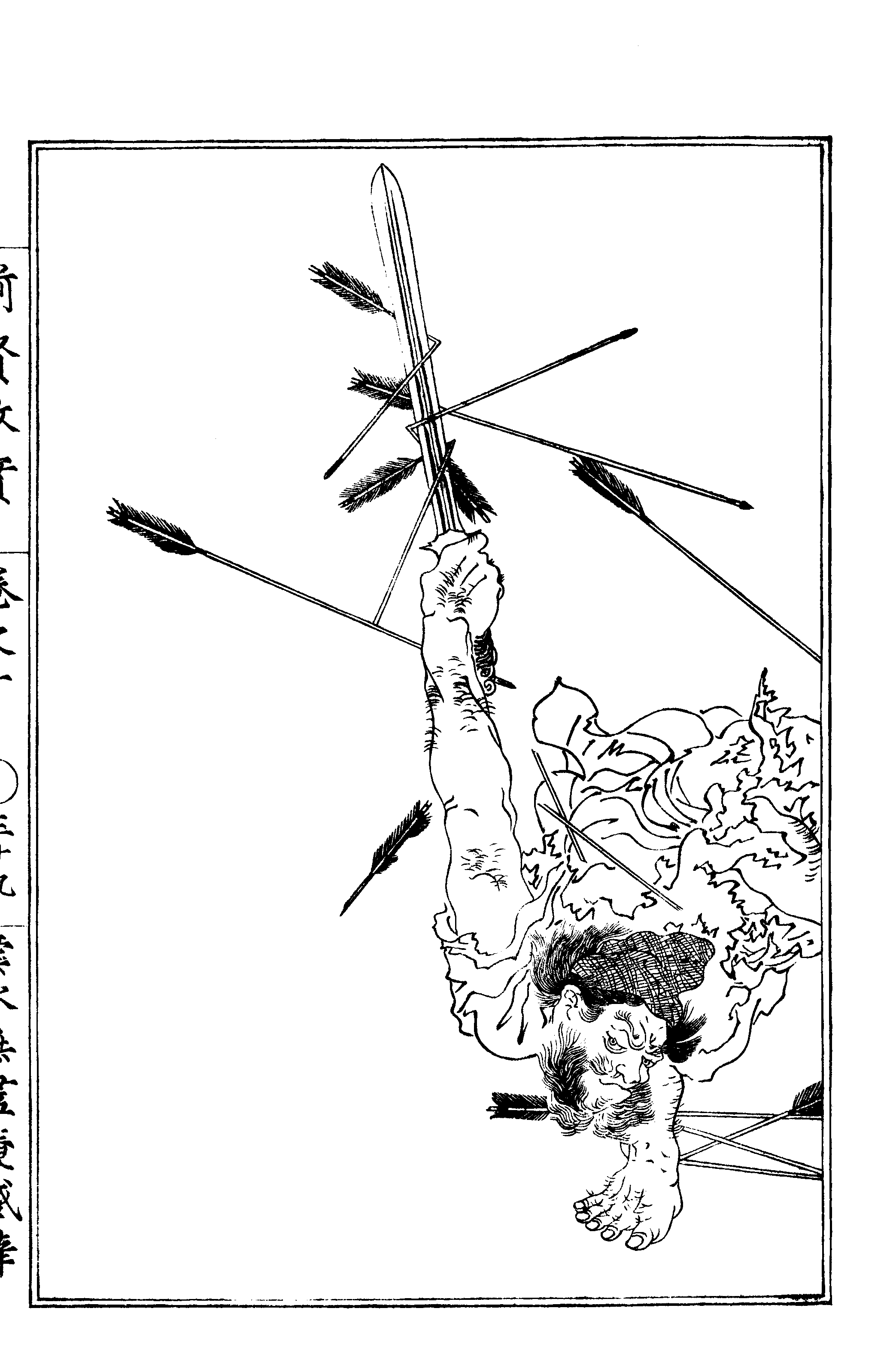
Totoribe no Yorozu wielding a Tsurugi (double-edged sword)

The main line of the Mononobe family, the most powerful opponent of Buddhism, was, together with its retainers including Totoribe no Yorozu, killed in the battle. The survivors were dispersed, and some adopted a different name.

Shōtoku has traditionally been credited with the founding of two temples which he is said to have had constructed following the battle: Shitennoji and Shigisan Temple.

== Notes ==
^{A} The name of Mount Shigi where the battle took place has been written as both Shigisan and Shigisen and for this reason the battle has been referred to as the Battle of Shigisan or Battle of Shigisen.
