= Kalanay Cave =

Cave and archaeological site in Masbate, Philippines

- Location in Philippines
- 12°28′03″N 123°15′26″E
- Location: island of Masbate
- Region: Philippines

The Kalanay Cave is a small cave located on the island of Masbate in the central Philippines. The cave is located specifically at the northwest coast of the island within the municipality of Aroroy. The artifacts recovered from the site were similar to those found to the Sa Huynh culture of Southern Vietnam. The site is part of the "Sa Huynh-Kalanay Interaction Sphere" which was an Iron Age maritime trading network associated with the Austronesian peoples of the Philippines, Vietnam, Taiwan, as well as most of northeastern Borneo and Southern Thailand. The type of pottery found in the site were dated 400 BC to AD 1500. The "Sa Huynh-Kalanay Interaction Sphere" is characterized by a remarkable continuity in trade goods, including decorated pottery and double-headed pendants and earrings known as lingling-o.

== Background ==
Examination of some pottery from the Carl E. Guthe Collection developed the idea of the Kalanay pottery complex. The cave was first excavated in 1951 and considerable disturbances were noted pre-excavation. In 1935, there was an earthquake which led to portions of the cave's roof to fall down and pottery scattered around the cave. Excavation of the site was finished in 1953.

== Kalanay pottery assemblage ==
The pottery excavated from the site was divided into varieties, Kalanay and Bagupantao pottery. The pottery also showed great variations in size, shape and decoration. Some of which are plain, while some are incised with tools. Common decoration patterns found around the neck of the pottery are curvilinear scrolls, rectangular meanders, triangles, etc. The paste used for the Kalanay pottery was of typical blackish gray color while Bagupantao pottery was of red-brown and was much finer than in Kalanay. Though after microscopic inspection, their paste are fundamentally the same. Most of the jars were probably for storage or cooking and some were used as ritual bowls.

There are several interpretations for the relationship of Kalanay and Bagupantao pottery:

(1) two distinct pottery traditions were brought together within one pottery-making community.
(2) two pottery groups were made by the same potters but for different functions, which could explain the difference in quality and decorations.
(3) they were made by the same potters for two different classes.

== Other findings ==
Other artifacts found in the cave were stone, shell, glass and metal artifacts. Two out of the seven stone artifacts were polished. The glass artifact is a portion of a blue glass bead. Iron and bronze artifacts were found in the site. The iron artifacts excavated were probably used as weapons.

There were also skeletal remains found in the site but due to their fragmentary condition, not much information was obtained.

== See also ==
- Austronesian peoples
- Lingling-o
