= Sa Huỳnh culture =

Former culture in central and southern Vietnam

- Geographical range: South Vietnam
- Period: Iron Age
- Dates: c. 1000 BC – c. 200
- Preceded by: Đông Sơn culture
- Followed by: Funan

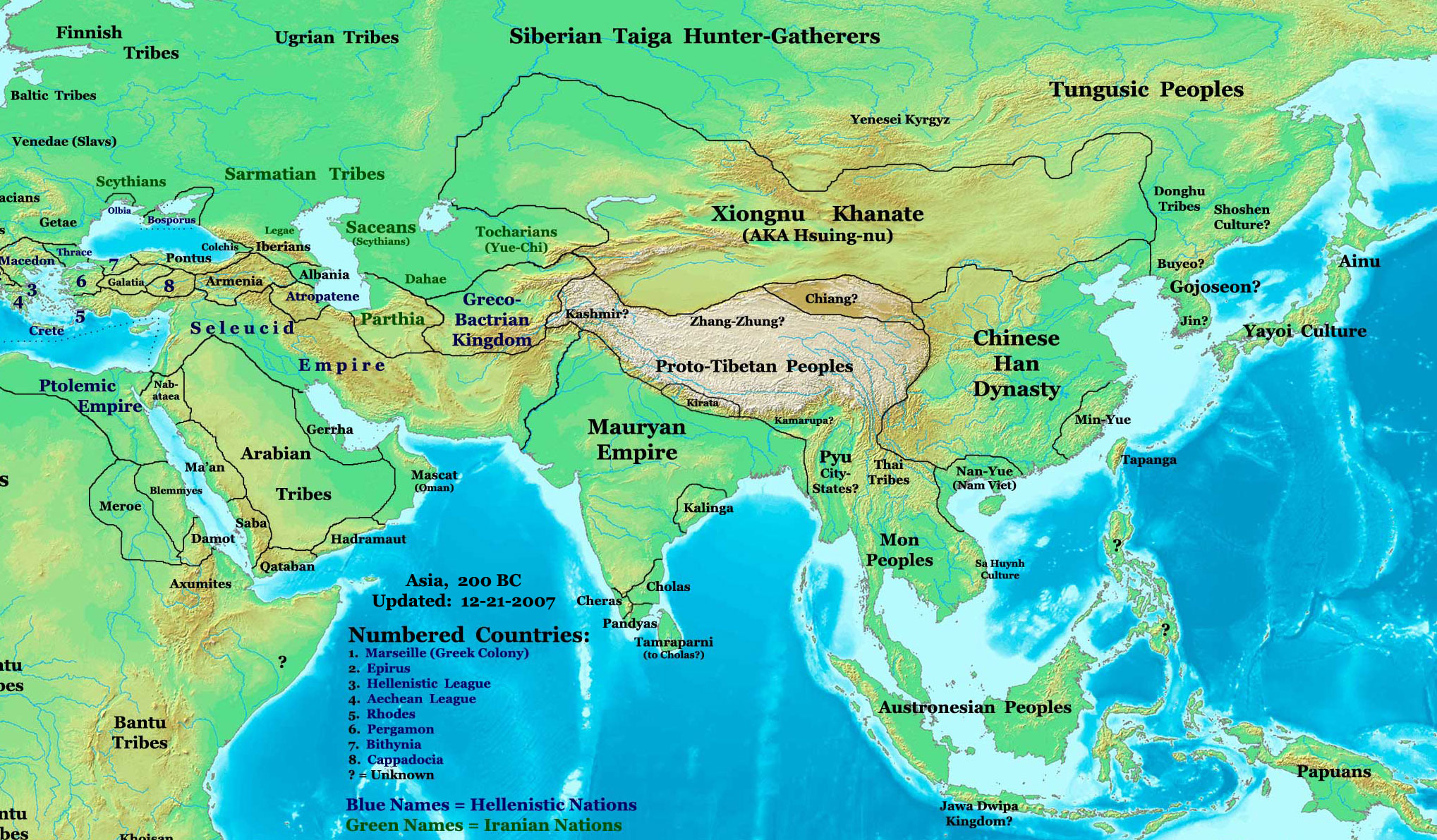
Asia in 200 BC, showing Sa Huynh and their neighbors

The Sa Huỳnh culture (Note: Pronounced sar-HWING. Frequently misspelled as Sa Huyun culture) was a culture in what is now central and southern Vietnam that flourished between 1000 BC and 200 AD. Archaeological sites from the culture have been discovered from the Mekong Delta to Quảng Bình province in central Vietnam. The Sa Huynh people were most likely the predecessors of the Cham people, an Austronesian-speaking people and the founders of the kingdom of Champa.

== Description ==
The site at Sa Huỳnh was discovered in 1909. Sa Huỳnh sites were rich in locally worked iron artefacts, typified by axes, swords, spearheads, knives and sickles. In contrast, bronze artifacts were dominant in the Đông Sơn culture sites found in northern Vietnam and elsewhere in mainland Southeast Asia.

The Sa Huỳnh culture cremated adults and buried them in jars covered with lids, a practice unique to the culture. Ritually broken offerings usually accompanied the jar burials. The culture is also typified by its unique ear ornaments featuring two-headed animals, believed by some to depict saola. The ornaments were commonly made from jade (nephrite), but also made from glass. Bead ornaments were also commonly found in Sa Huynh burials, most commonly made from glass.

== Trade network ==
The Sa Huỳnh culture showed evidence of an extensive trade network that existed between 500 BC to AD 1500, known as the Sa Huynh-Kalanay Interaction Sphere (named after the Sa Huỳnh culture and the Kalanay Cave of Masbate, Philippines). It was mainly between Sa Huỳnh and the Philippines, but also extended into archaeological sites in Taiwan, Southern Thailand, and northeastern Borneo. It is characterized by shared red-slipped pottery traditions, as well as double-headed and penannular ornaments known as lingling-o made from materials like green jade (sourced from Taiwan), green mica (from Mindoro), black nephrite (from Hà Tĩnh) and clay (from Vietnam and the Northern Philippines). Sa Huynh also produced beads made from glass, carnelian, agate, olivine, zircon, gold and garnet; most of whom use materials that are also imported. Han dynasty-style bronze mirrors were also found in Sa Huynh sites.

== Timeline of Iron age ==
Dates are approximate, consult particular article for details
Prehistoric (or Proto-historic) Iron Age Historic Iron Age

== Artifacts ==
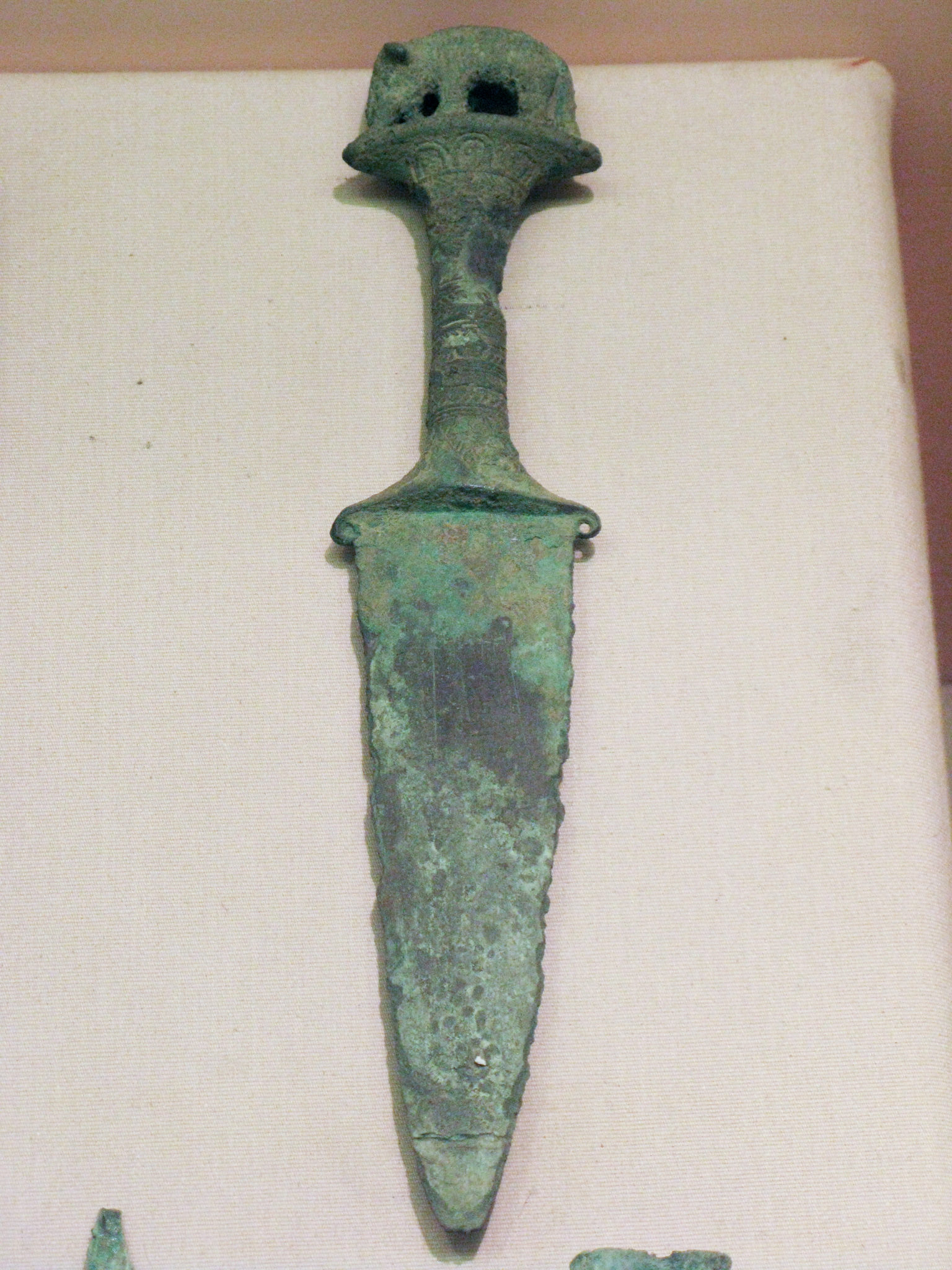
Bronze dagger

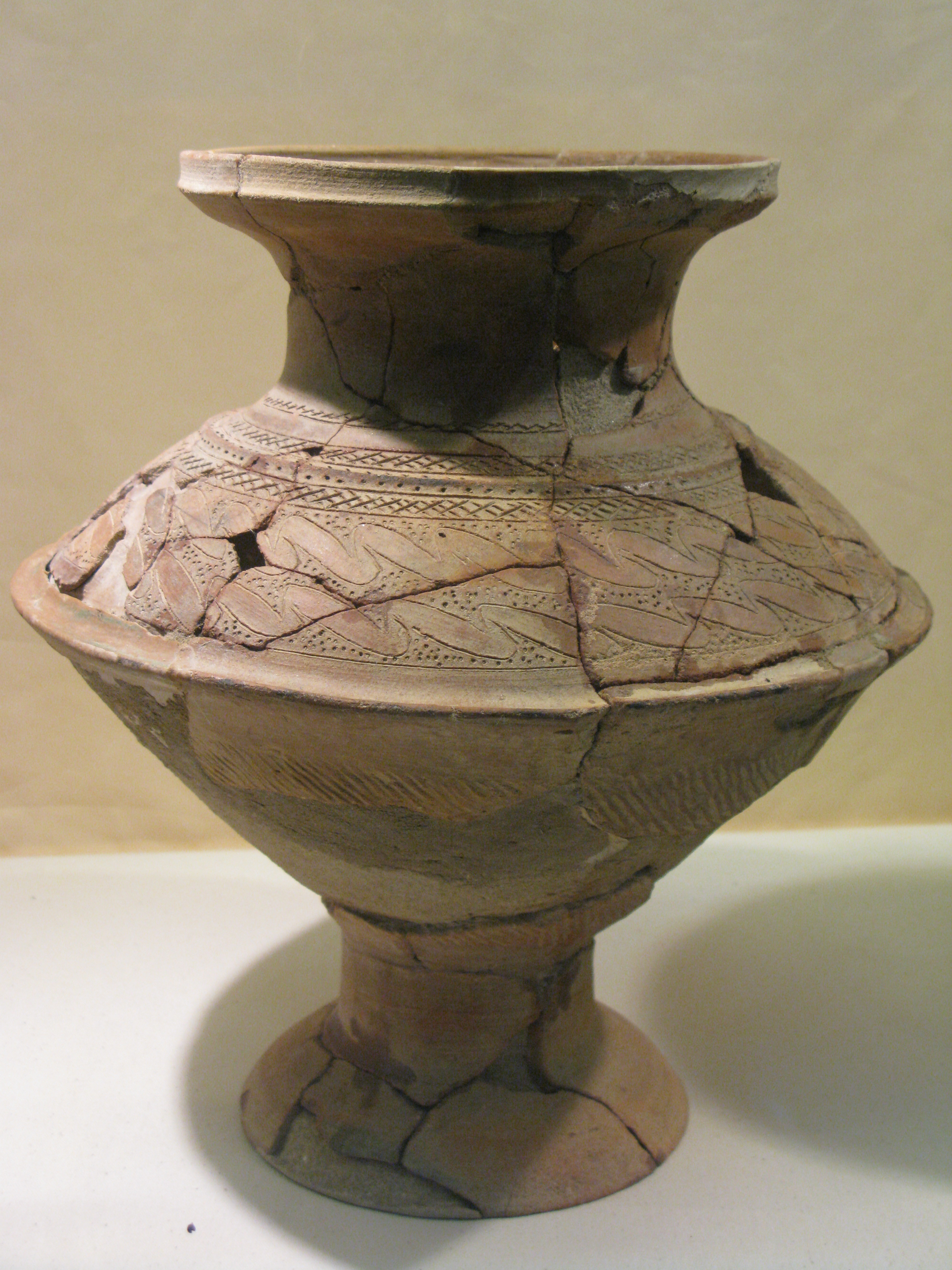
Pottery vase

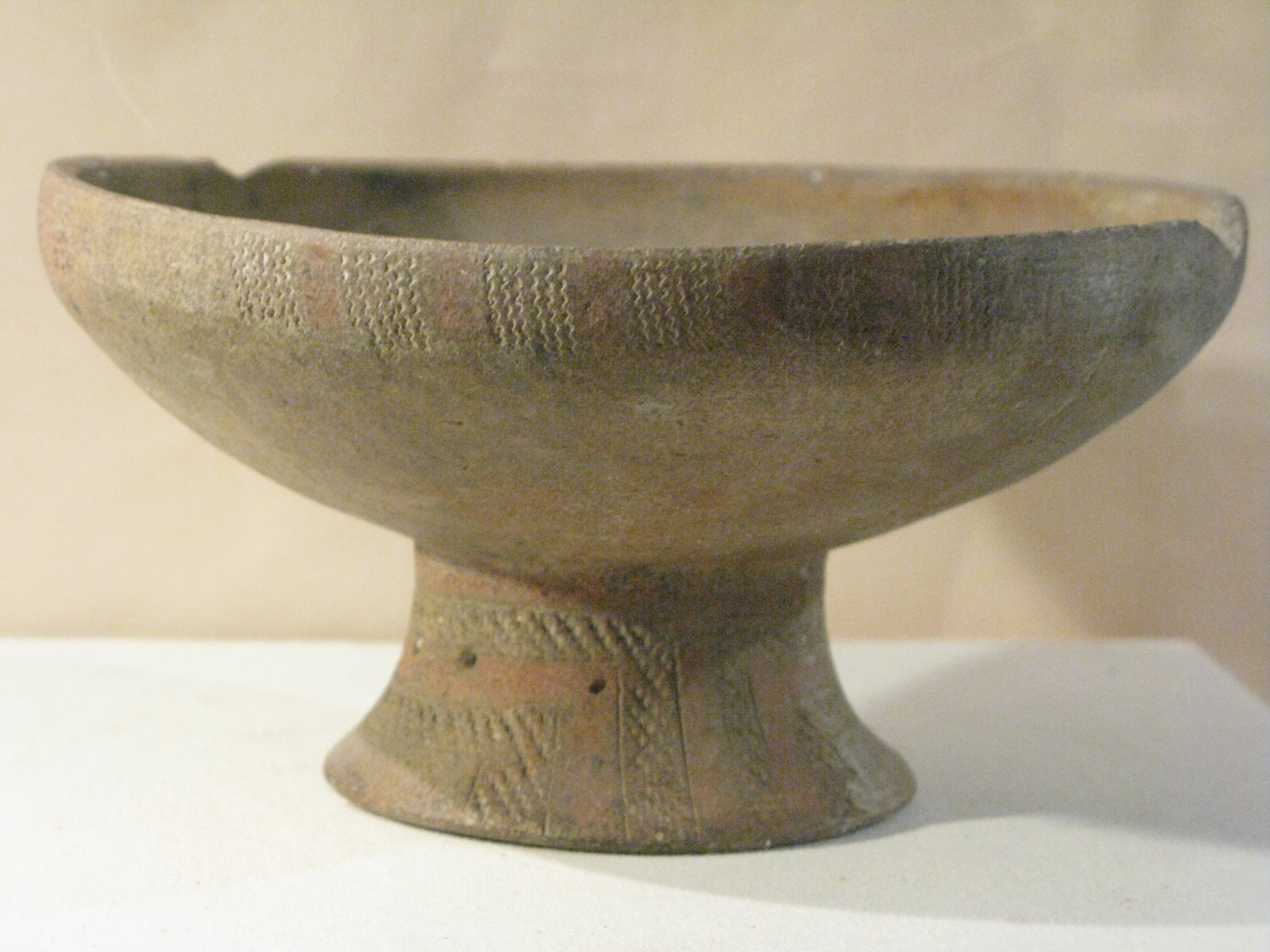
Pottery fruit tray

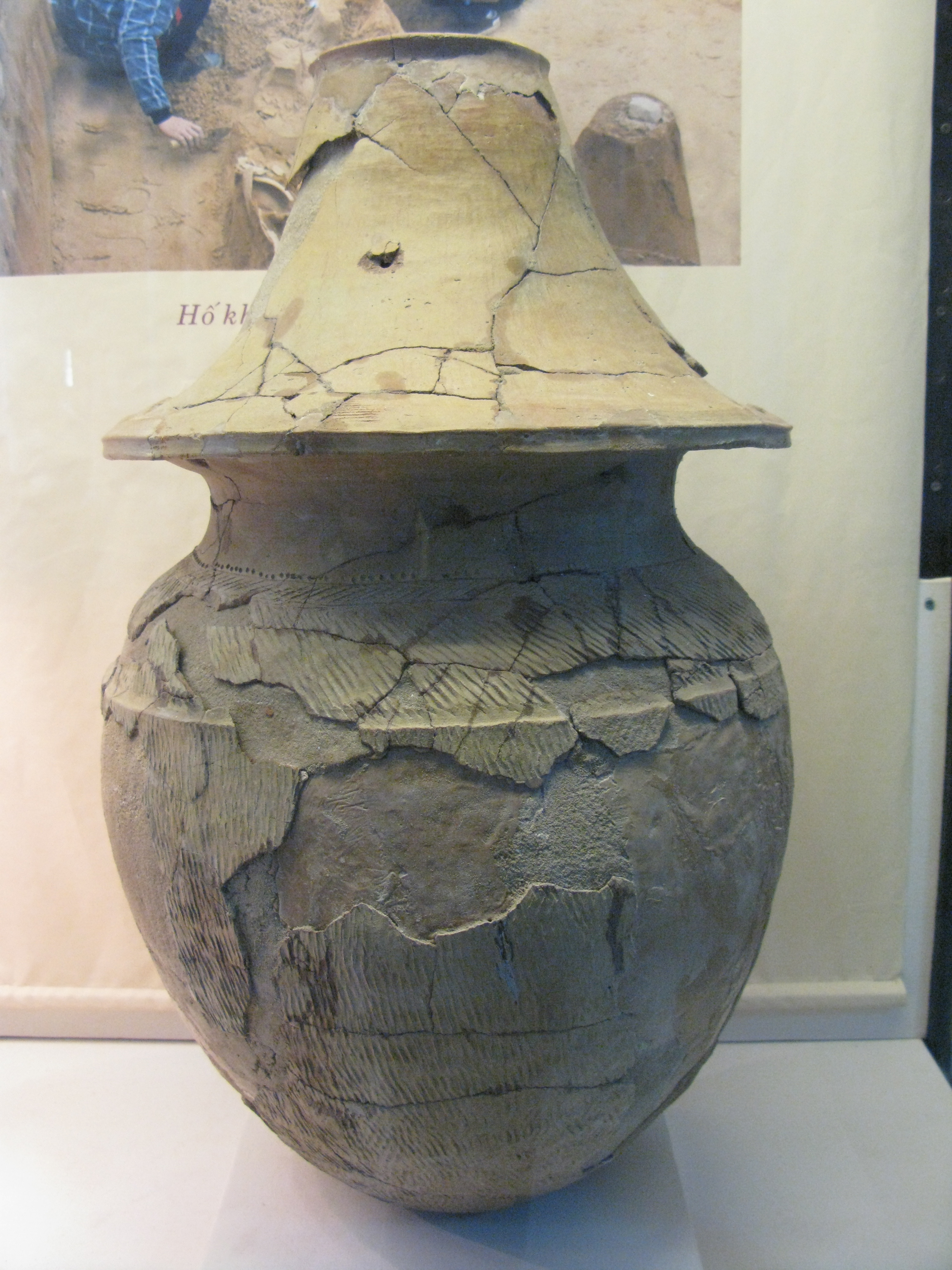
Pottery burial jar

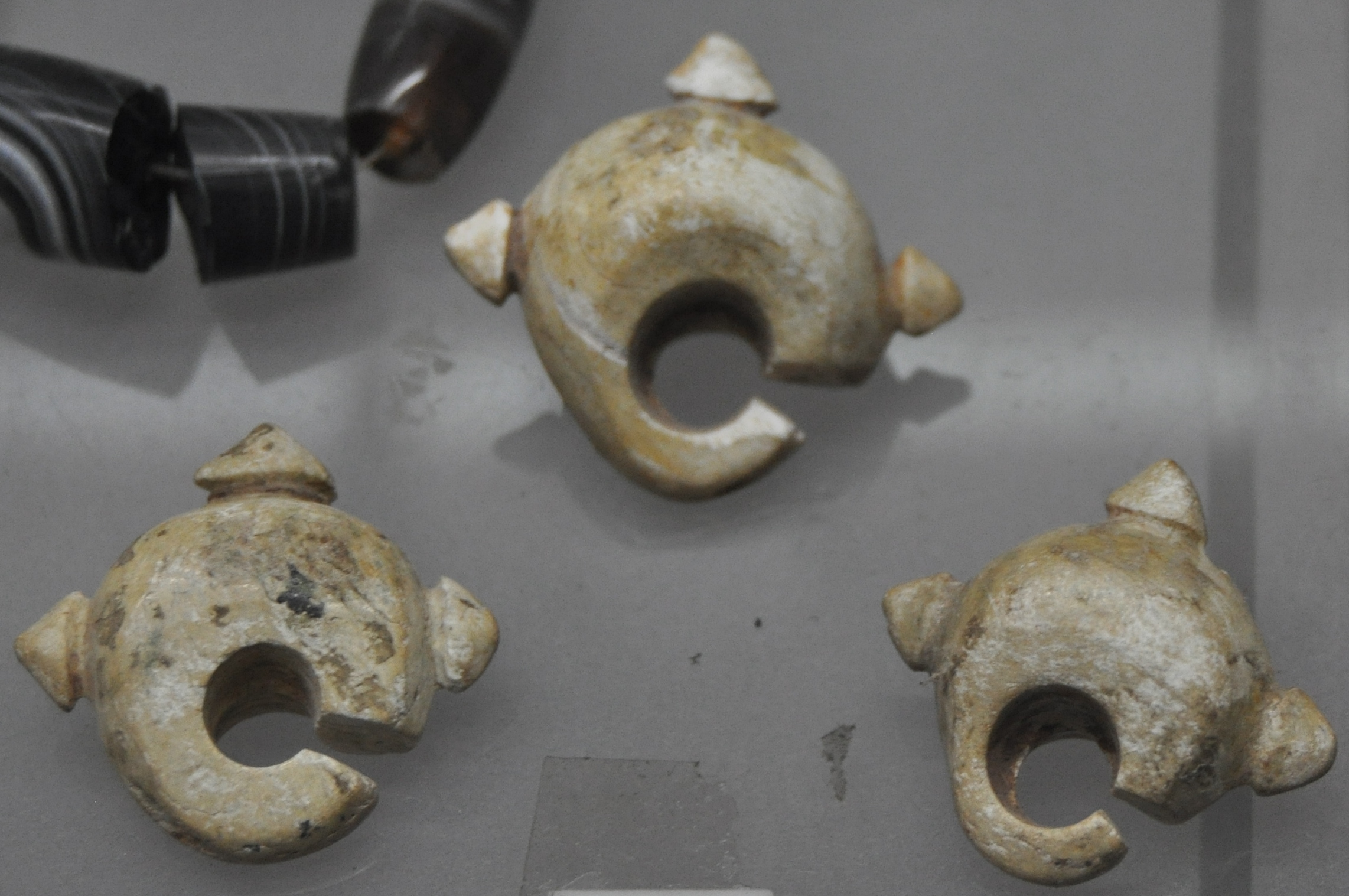
Jade penannular lingling-o

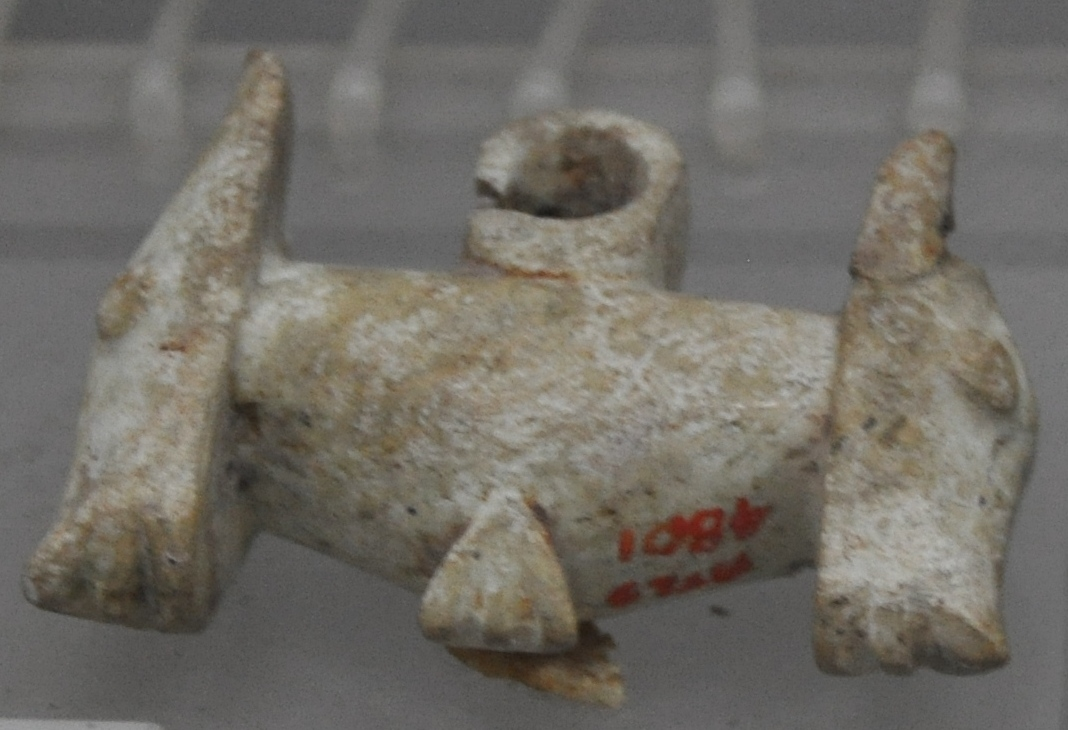
Jade double-headed lingling-o

== See also ==
- Austronesian peoples
- Plain of Jars
- Cát Tiên sanctuary
- Óc Eo
- Champa
- Buni culture
- Tabon Caves
