= Lingling-o =

Prehistoric Austronesian ornament

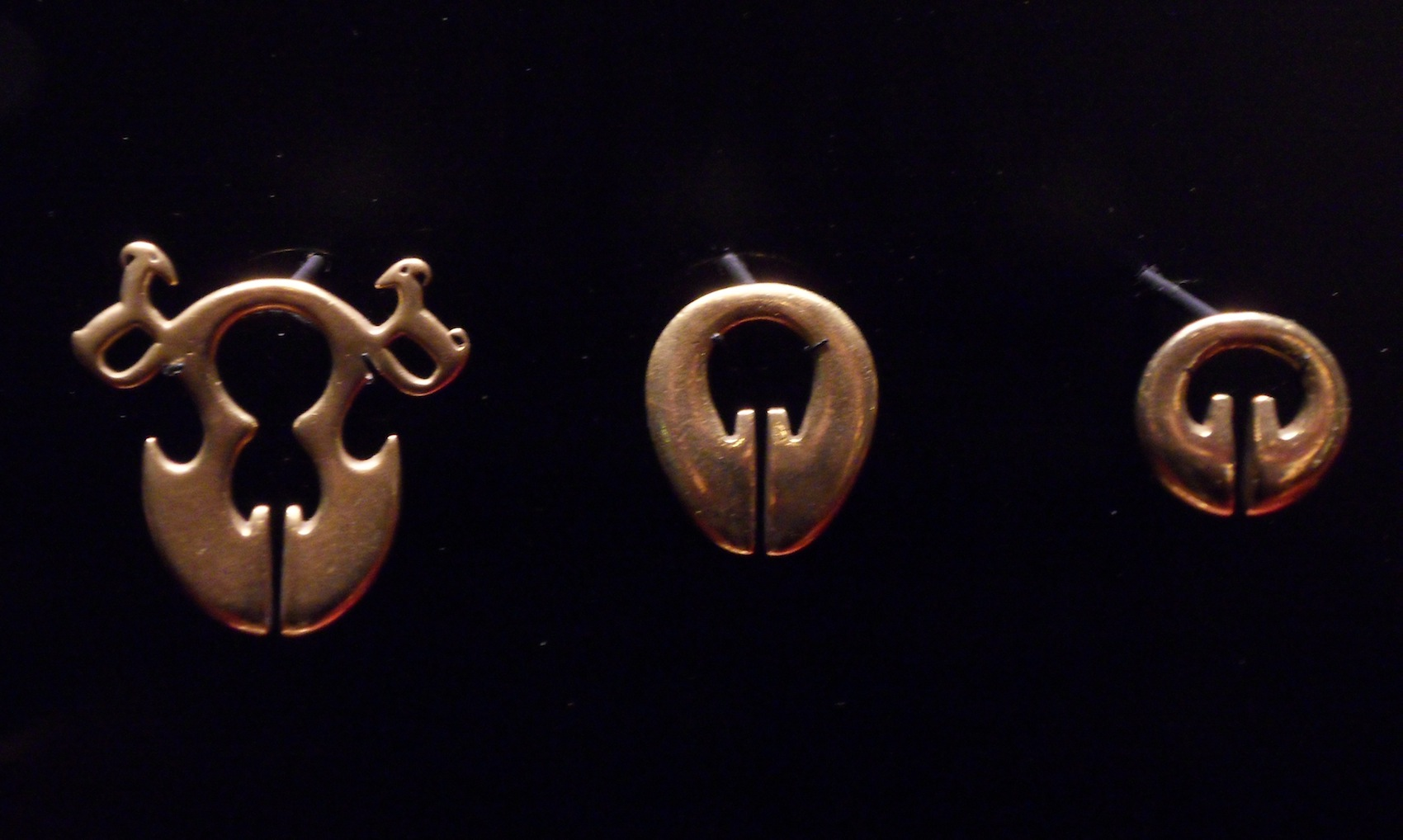
Three designs of metal lingling-o from the Philippines, now housed at the Musée du quai Branly in Paris, France

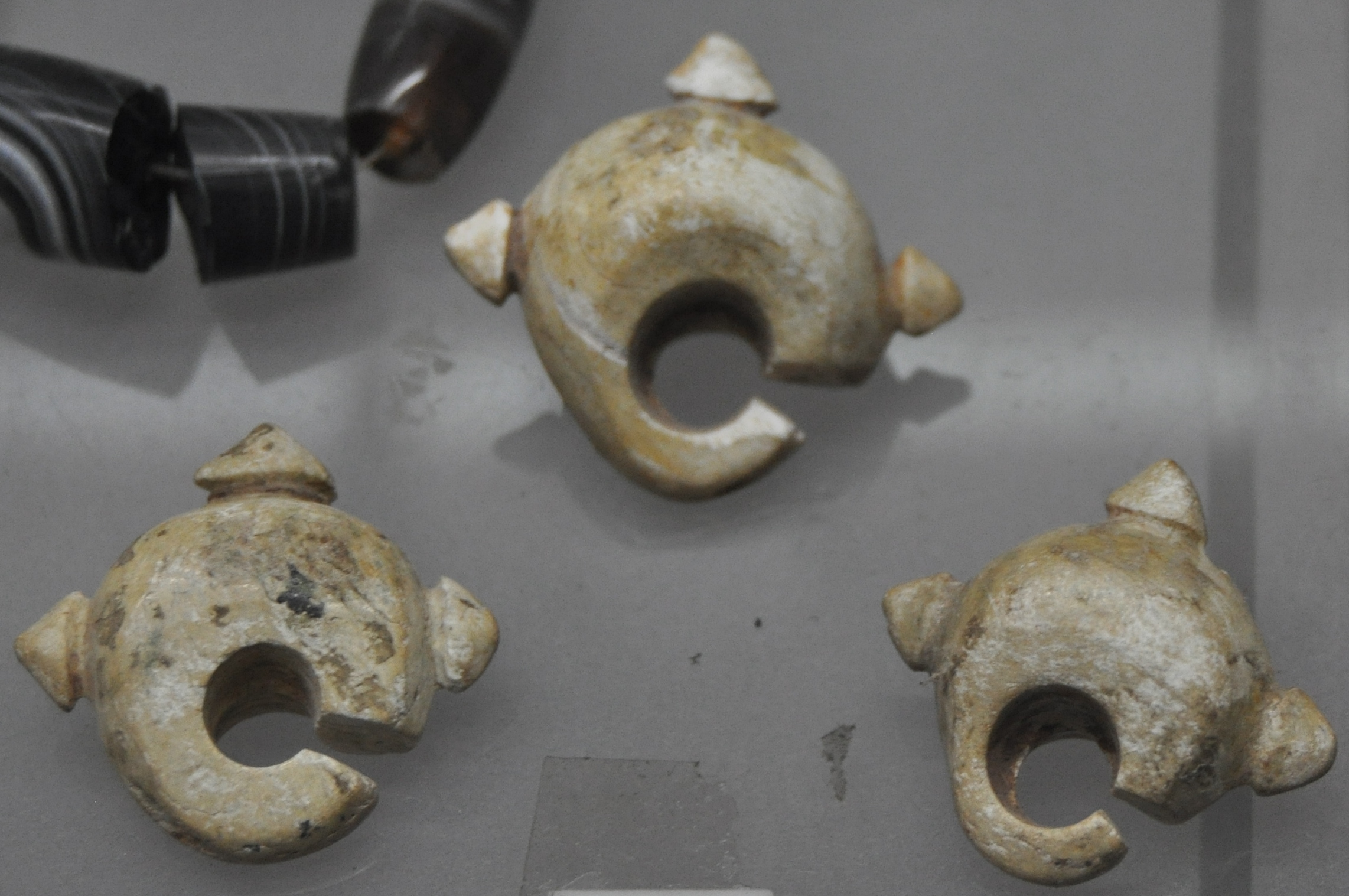
Jade lingling-o from Vietnam

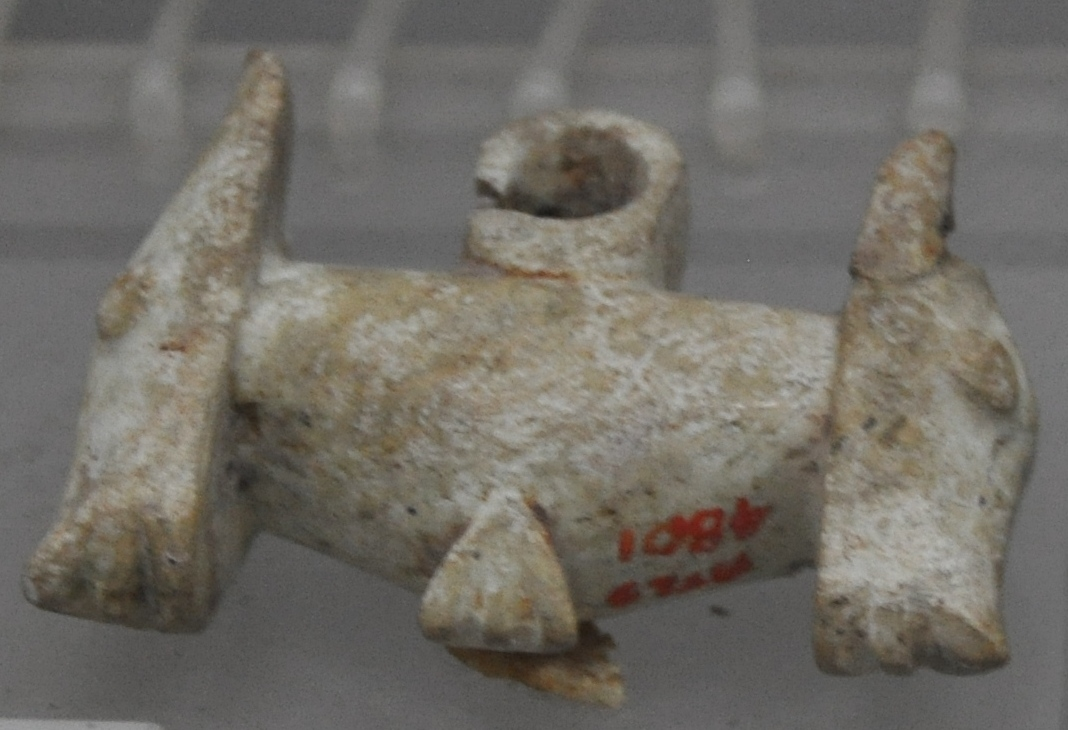
Jade lingling-o from Vietnam with the double-headed animal motif

Lingling-o or ling-ling-o are a type of penannular or double-headed pendant or amulet that have been associated with various Late Neolithic to late Iron Age Austronesian cultures. Most lingling-o were made in jade workshops in the Philippines, and to a lesser extent in the Sa Huỳnh culture of Vietnam, although the raw jade was mostly sourced from Taiwan.

The earliest surviving examples of lingling-o, dating back to around 500 BC, were made out of nephrite jade, but many later examples were also made of shell, gold, copper, and wood; the different materials suggest differences in the wearer's social standing. The term lingling-o was first popularized by H. Otley Beyer, who adapted it from the Southern Ifugao name for such ornaments; it has since also come to be used as a blanket term for various metal age Austronesian ornaments found in the Philippines, Taiwan, and Vietnam.

Although the earliest known lingling-o dates from 500 BC, the art of jade carving and its trade in the region is much older. In 2000 BC, the Maritime Jade Road was established by the animist indigenous peoples of the Philippines and Taiwan. This expansive trade network included other commodities as well, and later expanded to include Vietnam, Malaysia, Brunei, Singapore, Thailand, Indonesia, and Cambodia. The maritime jade road is one of the most extensive sea-based trade networks of a single geological material in the prehistoric world. It was in existence for at least 3,000 years, where its peak production was from 2000 BCE to 500 CE, older than the Silk Road in mainland Eurasia. It began to wane during its final centuries from 500 CE until 1000 CE. The entire period of the network was a golden age for the diverse animist societies of the region.

== Batanes workshop site ==
Earlier historians have posited that the earliest lingling-o artifacts found in the Philippines were created outside of the archipelago, but an expedition to the northern Philippine province of Batanes, led by archeologist Peter Bellwood in the early 2000s, led to the discovery of a lingling-o workshop, complete with construction tools and fragments. This find provides evidence of indigenous Philippine manufacturers as early as 2,500 years ago. Lingling-o manufacturing survived until around AD 1000 in the Philippines.

== See also ==
- Ifugao people
- Hongshan culture
- Sa Huynh-Kalanay Interaction Sphere
- Magatama: similar pendants from ancient Japan
- Gogok: similar pendants from the ancient Korean Peninsula
- Zhūlóng: zoomorphic stone artifacts produced in Neolithic China with a similar c- or comma-like shape
- Hei-tiki: similar Maori pendants
- H. Otley Beyer
- Peter Bellwood
