= Magatama =

Japanese curved beads

Magatama dating from Jōmon period to 8th century

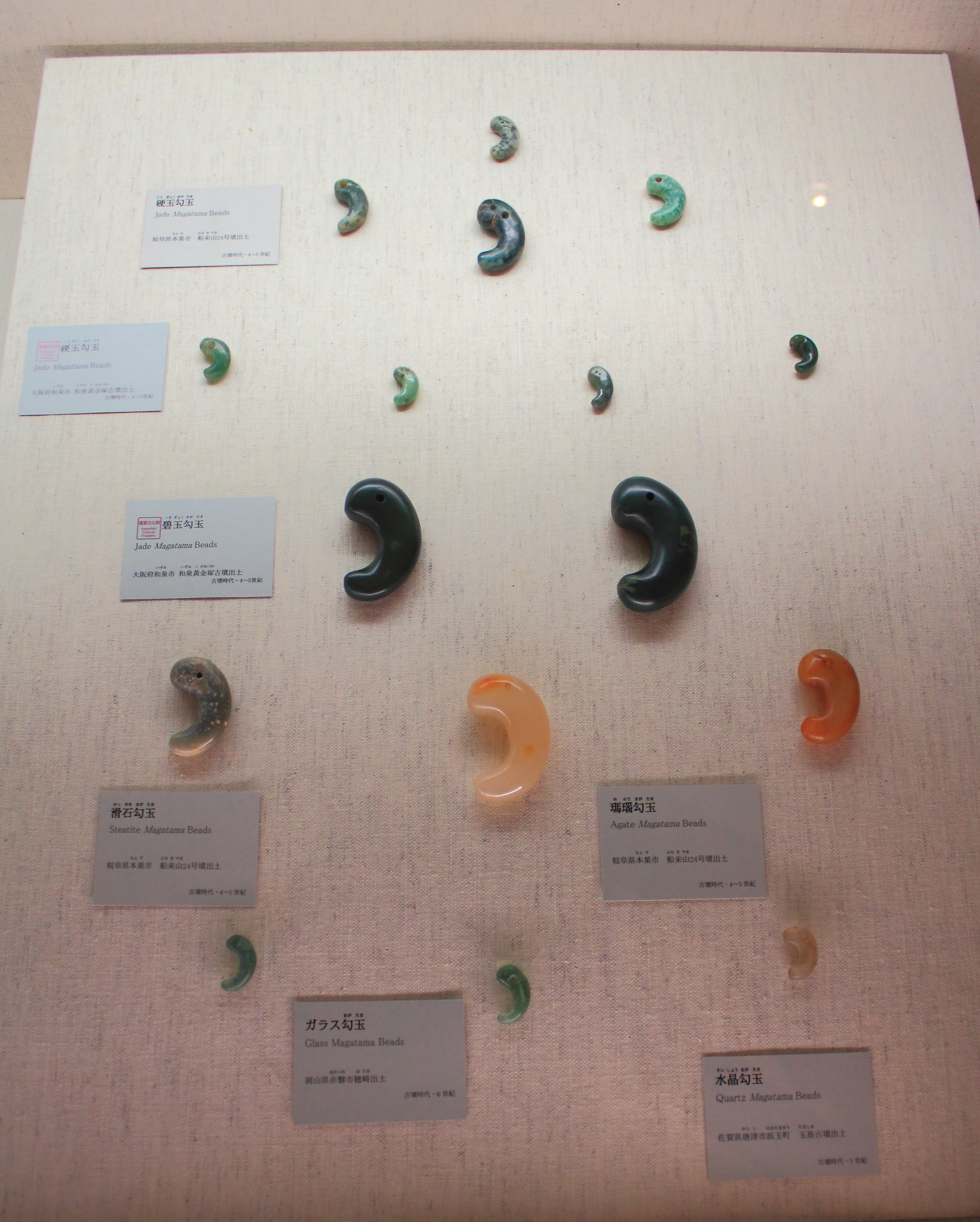
Magatama from Kofun period (Tokyo National Museum)

Magatama (勾玉; less often 曲玉) are curved, comma-shaped beads that appeared in prehistoric Japan from the Final Jōmon period through the Kofun period, approximately 1000 BCE to the 6th century CE. The beads, also described as jewels, were made of stone and earthen materials in the early period, but by the end of the Kofun period were being carved almost exclusively from jade. Magatama originally served as decorative jewelry, but, by the end of the Kofun period, had come increasingly to be regarded as ceremonial and religious objects.

== Jōmon period ==
Magatama first appeared in Japan in the Final Jōmon period (1000–300 BCE), and in this period were made from relatively simple, naturally occurring materials, including clay, talc, slate, quartz, gneiss, jadeite, nephrite, and serpentinite. Magatama from the Jōmon period were irregularly shaped, lacked continuity in form from region to region, and have been called "Stone Age magatama" for this reason. Magatama are thought to be an imitation of the teeth of large animals, pierced with a hole, which are found in earlier Jōmon remains. These resemble magatama, but more recent scholarship indicates that these early Jōmon may have simply had a decorative function, and have no relationship to magatama. Magatama in the Jōmon period appear to have moved from the purely decorative to having a status and ceremonial function by the end of the period. A "middle Jōmon exchange network" may have existed, whereby magatama were produced in regions where materials for their manufacture were readily plentiful. Jade and talc examples produced in bead-making villages located in present-day Itoigawa, Niigata, have been found at a large number of sites along the northern coast, in the central mountains, and in Kantō region.

=== Archaeological sites (Jōmon) ===
Examples of magatama from the Jōmon period have been discovered in large numbers at the Kamegaoka site in Tsugaru, Aomori Prefecture. The Kamegaoka remains are among the largest known Jōmon settlement in Japan, and the magatama, among other decorative objects found, may be an indicator of the high social status of the settlement.

Other sites associated with the Kamegaoka settlement have yielded magatama, including the Ōboriya shell mound, in the northwest corner of Ōfunato Bay, which yielded a huge number of beads, as well as the Korekawa site, near Hachinohe, Aomori Prefecture. Remains from the Korekawa site can be seen at the Korekawa Archaeological Museum in Hachinohe. Stone and clay magatama and magatama-like beads have also been discovered at the Amataki site, Ninohe, Iwate Prefecture, Osagata site, Ibaraki Prefecture, and the Kou site, Fujiidera, Osaka Prefecture. Numerous magatama at the Ōishi site, Bungo-ōno, Ōita Prefecture, Kyushu, show signs of being used for ceremonial, rather than decorative, purposes.

The Sannai-Maruyama Site, excavated 1992 in Aomori, Aomori Prefecture, yielded three large jade beads measuring 5.5 by 6.5 centimetres (2.2 in × 2.6 in).

== Yayoi period ==
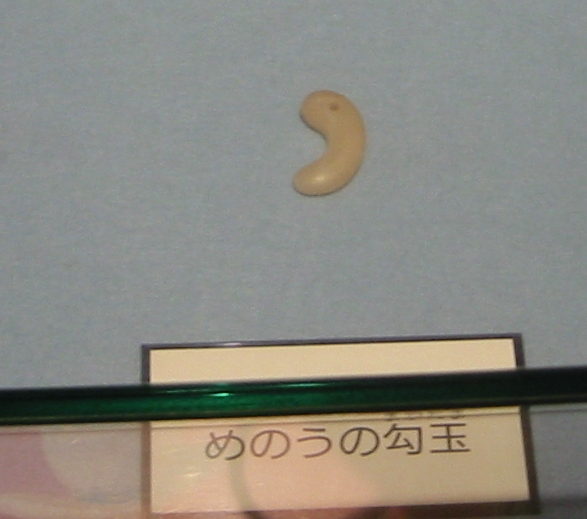
Agate magatama, Kobe Archaeology Center (神戸市埋蔵文化財センター, Kōbeshi Maizō Bunkazai Sentā)

Magatama in the Yayoi period (300 BCE – 300 CE) are notably different from Jōmon-period magatama. The jewels moved from a primitive, non-standard form towards more polished and uniform form in this period. The technology to cut large gemstones and polish jewels notably advanced in the Yayoi period. Refined materials such as jadeite, serpentinite, and glass replaced the less sophisticated materials of the Jōmon period. Yayoi period magatama are noted for their reverse C-shaped form, which by the end of the period had become an almost squared shape. From the Yayoi period onwards, magatama uniformly feature a bored hole that allowed the jewels to be held on a string.

The Yayoi period is marked by specific geographic centers specializing in magatama and the widespread trade of magatama. The period is marked by the formation of power centers that came to be individual states. The development of weapons increased in this period to protect increasingly developed rice fields and fishing rights. Trade greatly increased in this period, as did the specialization of production of certain items, including magatama. Magatama producing areas exchanged their product with other products, specifically rice, leading to the widespread distribution of magatama across Japan. Magatama were commonly used to create necklaces and bracelets worn on the wrists or ankles. The necklace was typically constructed of jadeite magatama separated by cylindrical bored-holed pieces of jasper. Small beads of dark-blue glass are also not uncommon on the necklace. The bracelet typically also used shells from the coastal areas of Shikoku and the Inland Sea, wood, and bronze. In this period the use of the mirror, sword, and jewels as status symbols for village, and later regional leaders of all kinds, emerged in the Yayoi period, and point to the origin of the mirror, sword, and magatama as the Imperial Regalia of Japan.

The Records of the Three Kingdoms, the earliest historical document with a reference to Japan, describes the Wa people, an ancient country of Yamatai, and its queen, Himiko. The Record indicates that when Himiko died, her relative Iyo, a girl of 13, was made queen and sent a delegation of twenty officials under Yazuku, an imperial general, to offer tribute to the Northern Wei court. "The delegation visited the capital and offered to the court five thousand white gems and two pieces of carved jade, as well as twenty pieces of brocade with variegated designs." The carved jade in the Record likely describes a tribute of two jade magatama.

=== Archaeological sites (Yayoi) ===
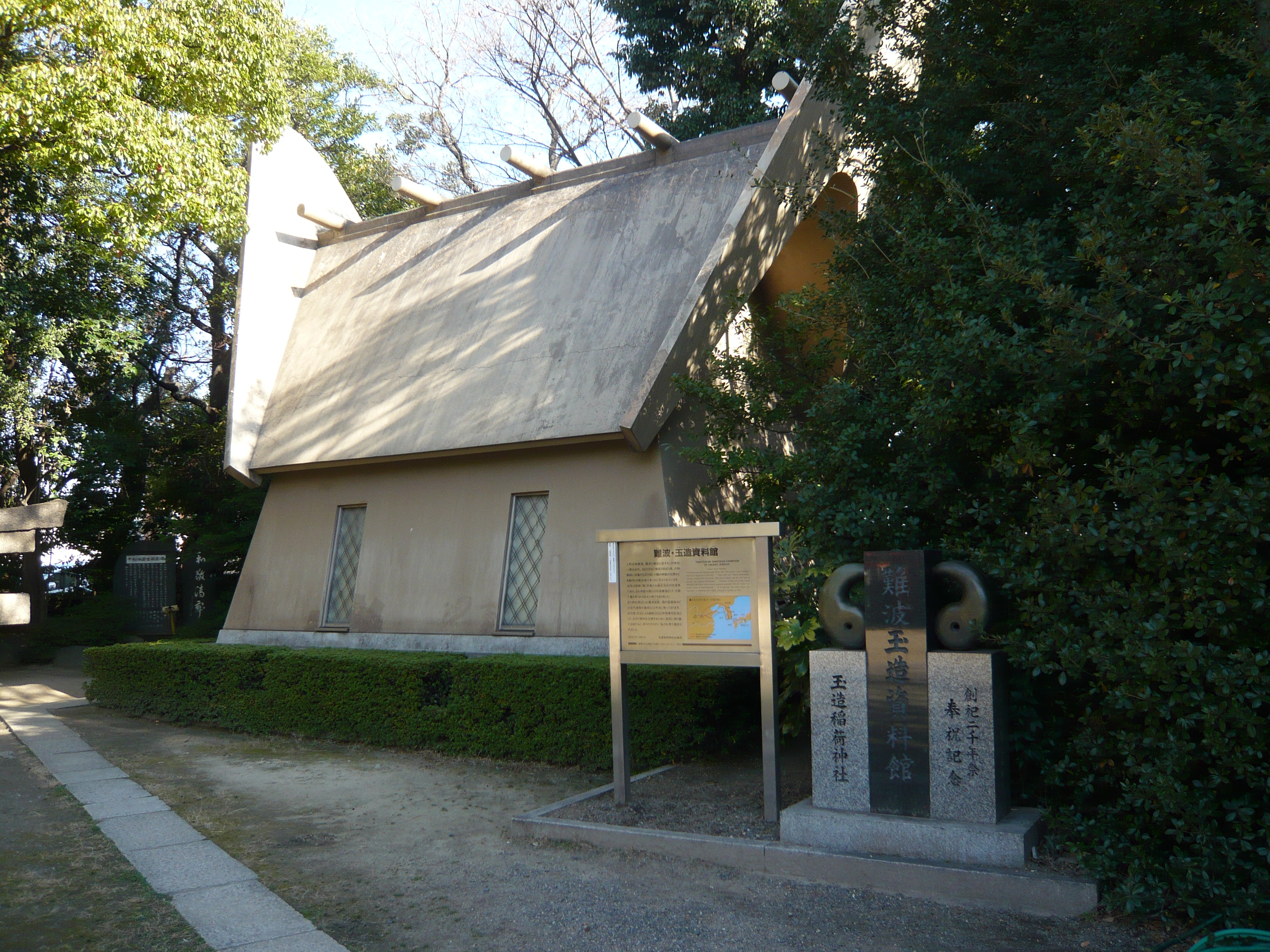
Museum housing artifacts of magatama production, Tamatsukuri Inari Shrine, Osaka

The large-scale Yayoi period remains at the Yoshinogari site, Yoshinogari and Kanzaki in Saga Prefecture revealed examples of lead glass magatama typical of the Yayoi period. In 2003, the excavation of a large Yayoi period settlement in Tawaramoto, Nara, also revealed two large jade magatama, one 4.64 centimetres (1.83 in), the second 3.63 centimetres (1.43 in) in length. The larger Tawaramoto magatama is the 10th-largest example found to date in Japan. Both jade magatama from the site are of unusually high-quality brilliant green jade.

One known center of Yayoi magatama production was in the area of the Tamatsukuri Inari Shrine in Osaka. Tamatsukuri literally means "jewel making", and a guild, the Tamatsukuri-be, was active from the Yayoi period. An existing jewel at the shrine is said to have great spiritual power. Magatama appear on all sorts of implements of the present-day temple, including amulets, roof tiles, and lanterns. The inari female fox at the gate of a subshrine of Tamatsukuri Inari Shrine wears a necklace of magatama. The shrine has an exhibit on the history and production of magatama.

== Kofun period ==
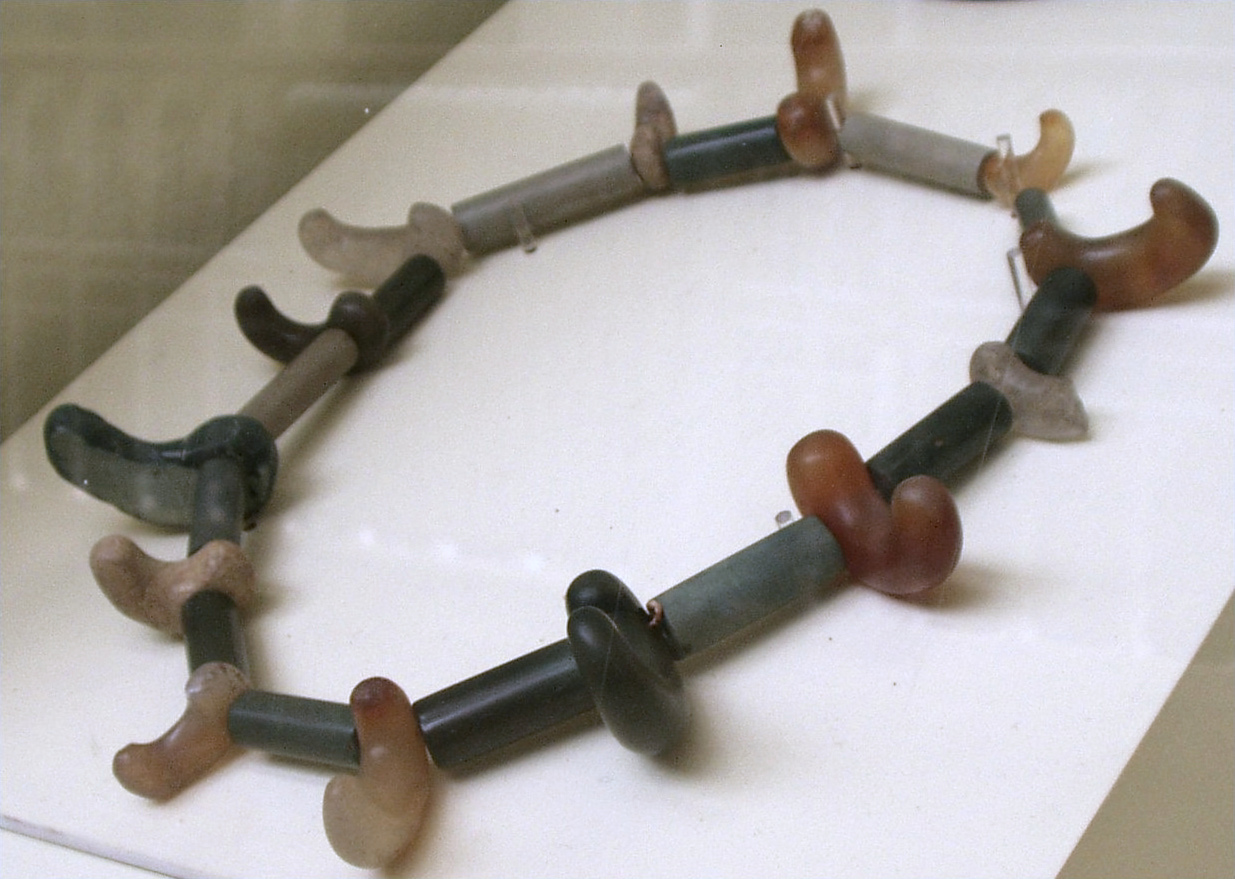
Necklace of jade magatama from a Japanese burial

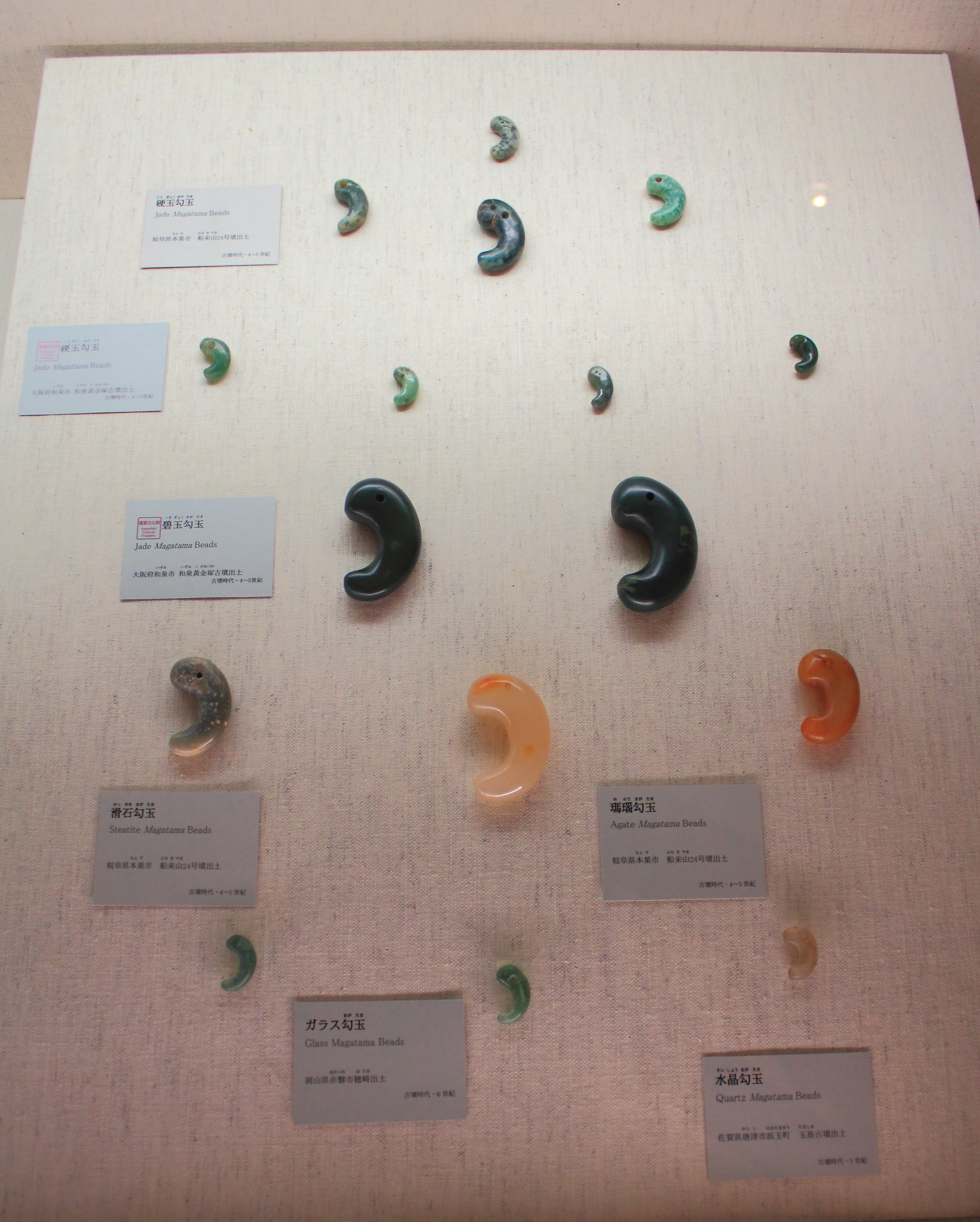
Magatama from the Kofun period

Magatama became very common in the Kofun period (250–536 CE), and by the end of the period almost all kofun tumuli contained magatama. In the early Kofun period, magatama were made from jadeite as in earlier periods, but by the middle of the period were made from jasper, and by the end of the period, almost exclusively of agate and jade. Magatama capped by silver or gold also appear towards the end of the period. Large magatama made of talc, imitations of smaller ones made of more precious materials, were used as grave goods. Magatama are found in kofun tumuli across Japan from the period. Their use went from merely decorative to sacred and ceremonial grave goods. Chōjigashira magatama (丁字頭勾玉) are magatama with inscriptions that look like flowers of the clove tree and feature a hole allowing them to be attached to a cord. These first appear in the Kofun period. Also in the Kofun period, magatama appear on necklaces, with several magatama set between bored cylinders. Archeological remains show evidence of ankle bracelets of similar design, but these are less common. Clay haniwa funerary objects of the Kofun period commonly depict people wearing the necklaces and ankle bracelets.

=== Archaeological sites (Kofun) ===
Examples of stone magatama from the Kofun period are especially numerous. An excavation of the Kamegaoka Kofun, Kishiwada, Osaka, revealed a local who had been buried with a jade, jasper, and alabaster magatama necklace, as well as magatama placed near the feet. A bronze mirror imported from China accompanying the burial was dated to 239 CE. The kofun is a Designated Historical Spot of the city of Kishiwada. Ceremonial offerings from a burial from the Kisami-Araida area of Shimoda, Shizuoka also revealed clay reproductions of magatama used as effigies. The excavation of the Ubusuna Kofun in Kyōtango, Kyoto yielded two fully intact magatama necklaces of jade and agate, with segments between 1.7 and 5.1 centimetres (0.67 and 2.01 in) in length.

The large Muro Miyayama Kofun of Katsuragi, Nara, on the Yamato Plain, 238 millimetres (9.4 in) in length, was plundered long before its excavation, but revealed 600 talc ceremonial magatama among other funerary objects, which also included 10 bronze Han Chinese mirrors. The Hiraide remains of Shiojiri, Nagano, one of the three largest prehistoric sites in Japan, and far from any regional power center, includes typical Kofun period remains, but also objects associated with modern Shinto ceremonial practice. Nevertheless, kofun in Hiraide reveal both plain and elaborate magatama among other funerary objects.

The Sakurai Kofun in Sakurai, Nara, excavated in 1949, represents a kofun from the final phase of the Kofun period, and is possibly from a ruler associated with the imperial family. The kofun is 25 metres (82 ft) high and shows evidence of being surrounded by a moat. Among the very large number of funerary objects were high-quality weapons, including swords, 10 mirrors, and a necklace of jadeite magatama, agate cylinders, and glass beads used to make a magatama-style necklace.

== Origin of magatama forms ==
Archaeologists and historians are unable yet to explain what the origins of magatama forms are, or whether these forms can be traced back to one convergent source. A number of explanations have been suggested, including:

- They may be fashioned after animal fangs/teeth
- They may be modeled after the shape of fetuses
- They may be symbolic of the shape of the soul
- They may be modeled after the shape of the moon
- That there is meaning and connotation attached to the shape of the magatama itself (i.e. meaning comes from the form itself, and not that magatama has been patterned after anything else)

== In Japanese mythology ==
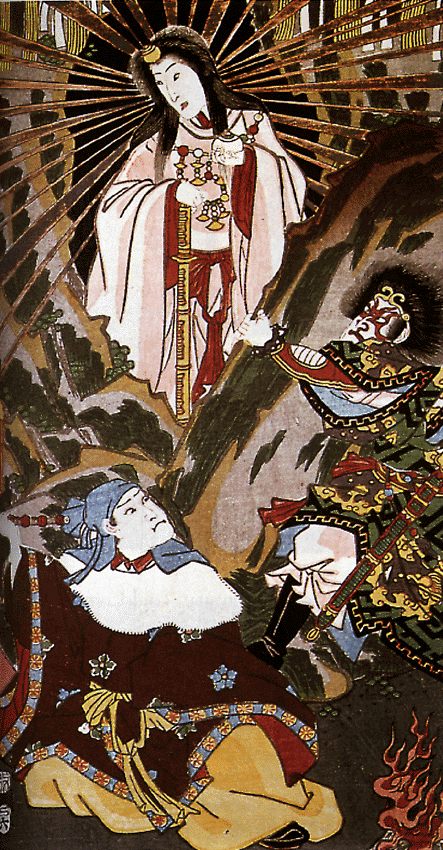
Artist's rendition of Amaterasu emerging from the cave holding a magatama necklace in her left hand, and a sword in her right

The Kojiki and Nihon Shoki, completed in the 8th century, have numerous references to magatama. They appear in the first chapter of the Nihon Shoki, which largely describes the mythology of Japan. Susanoo, god of the sea and storms, received five hundred magatama from Tamanoya no mikoto, or Ame-no-Futodama-no-mikoto, the jewel-making deity. Susanoo went to heaven and presented them to his sister, the sun goddess Amaterasu, who bit off successive parts of the magatama, and blew them away to create other deities. Tamanoya no mikoto remains the god of magatama, glasses, and cameras. In the legend Amaterasu later shuts herself in a cave. Ama-no-Koyane-no-mikoto hung magatama, among other objects, on a five hundred-branch sakaki tree, to successfully lure Amaterasu from the cave. In the year 58, in the reign of the Emperor Suinin, the Nihon Shoki records that a dog killed and disemboweled a mujina (badger), and a magatama was discovered in its stomach. This magatama was presented to Suinin, who enshrined it at Isonokami Shrine, where it is said to presently reside. A similar practice is described again in the Nihon Shoki during the reign of the Emperor Chūai. Chūai made an inspection trip to the Tsukushi, or Kyūshū, and was presented with an enormous sakaki tree hung with magatama as well as other sacred objects.

=== Yasakani no Magatama ===
A noted magatama is the Yasakani no Magatama (八尺瓊勾玉; also 八尺瓊曲玉 and 八坂瓊曲玉), one of the three Imperial Regalia of Japan. Swords, mirrors, and jewels were common objects of status for regional rulers in Japan as early as the Yayoi period, and were further widespread in the Kofun period, as shown by their ubiquitous presence in kofun tumuli. The Yasakani no Magatama is stored at the Kashiko-dokoro (賢所), the central shrine of the Three Palace Sanctuaries at the Tokyo Imperial Palace, and is used in the enthronement ceremony of the Emperor of Japan.According to the 14th-century historical work Jinnō Shōtōki by Kitabatake Chikafusa, the three regalia each embody a specific virtue: the sword Kusanagi (also called Ame-no-Murakumo-no-Tsurugi) represents valor, the Yasakani no Magatama represents wisdom, and the mirror Yata no Kagami represents benevolence.

Daniel Clarence Holtom stated in 1928 in Japanese enthronement ceremonies; with an account of the imperial regalia that the Yasakani no Magatama is the only one of the three regalia that is used in its original form for ceremonies, preferring the use of replicas for the sword and mirror due to its delicate fragility. Replicas of the sword and mirror were made as early as the 9th century, and the originals were entrusted to other shrines.

== Usage in Ryūkyūan religion ==
D. C. Holtom stated that noro priestesses (Okinawan: nūru) of the Ryukyu Kingdom wore magatama necklaces early in the 20th century for ceremonial purposes, but provides no other details.

== In popular culture ==
In The Legend of Zelda: Skyward Sword and The Legend of Zelda: Tears of the Kingdom, the Amber Relics, Dusk Relics, and Secret Stones are all based on the magatama.

In the Ace Attorney series, a magatama is frequently cited as the source of an ability that lets its wearer determine people's true intentions.

In Gamera: Guardian of the Universe and its sequels, magatama are used to psychically connect Gamera to human characters.

In Unconnected Marketeers, the 18th installment of Touhou Project, the character Misumaru Tamatsukuri is able to craft magatama. Aunn Komano, introduced in the 16th installment, Hidden Star in Four Seasons, has her ears designed in the shape of magatama. Keiki Haniyasushin from the 17th installment, Wily Beast and Weakest Creature wears a magatama necklace.

In Blue Eye Samurai, the main character Mizu wore a blue magatama on her katana.

In Miraculous: Tales of Ladybug & Cat Noir, the Kwagatama charms named after the magatama serve as a symbol of a bond between the kwami and their holder.

In Shin Megami Tensei III: Nocturne, magatamas appear in the form of parasitic, insect-like creatures that grant their human hosts special, demonic powers.

In Ghostwire: Tokyo, magatamas are made of jade and are used for upgrading Akito's abilities. They can be obtained through side missions (37), and street stalls (three).

In Ōkami and its spiritual successor Ōkamiden, one of the weapon options (rosaries) are based on Amaterasu's magatama.

In The Irregular at Magic High School, magatama are a class of magical Relics with the ability to store magic sequences.

In Blue Seed, magatama are used as vessels to contain mitama which bestow power to those implanted with them. The series' plot is based on the Izumo cycle from Japanese mythology.

In Sailor Moon, Sailor Uranus' Space Sword, Sailor Neptune's Deep Aqua Mirror, and Sailor Pluto's Garnet Orb are based on each item.

In the Japanese card game “Yu-Gi-Oh!”, “Hu-Li the Jewel Mikanko” is based on the “Yasakani no Magatama” - one of the “Three Imperial Regalia of Japan”.

In the anime and manga Toilet-Bound Hanako Kun the protagonist, Nene Yashiro, wears Magatama in her hair.

In the manga Red Eyes Sword, Magatama manifestation is the trump card of Susanoo.

In the video game Lucid Blocks, the player's XP bar is in the shape of a magatama.

In Monster Hunter Rise, the Wirebug's general shape and color were inspired by a magatama.

== See also ==
- Gogok – a similarly shaped jewel found in the Korean Peninsula.
- Lingling-o – similarly shaped jade, wood, or metal pendants from various ancient Austronesian cultures.
- Mamuta – an enemy from the Pikmin series of games aesthetically based on magatama.
- Nyoihōju (如意宝珠) – a wish-fulfilling jewel within both Hindu and Buddhist traditions, said by some to be the equivalent of the philosopher's stone in Western alchemy. Be that as it may, it is only one of several Mani Jewel images found in Buddhist scripture.
- Pig dragon or zhūlóng – zoomorphic stone artifacts produced in Neolithic China with a similar c- or comma-like shape.
