= Pig dragon =

Type of artifact from ancient China

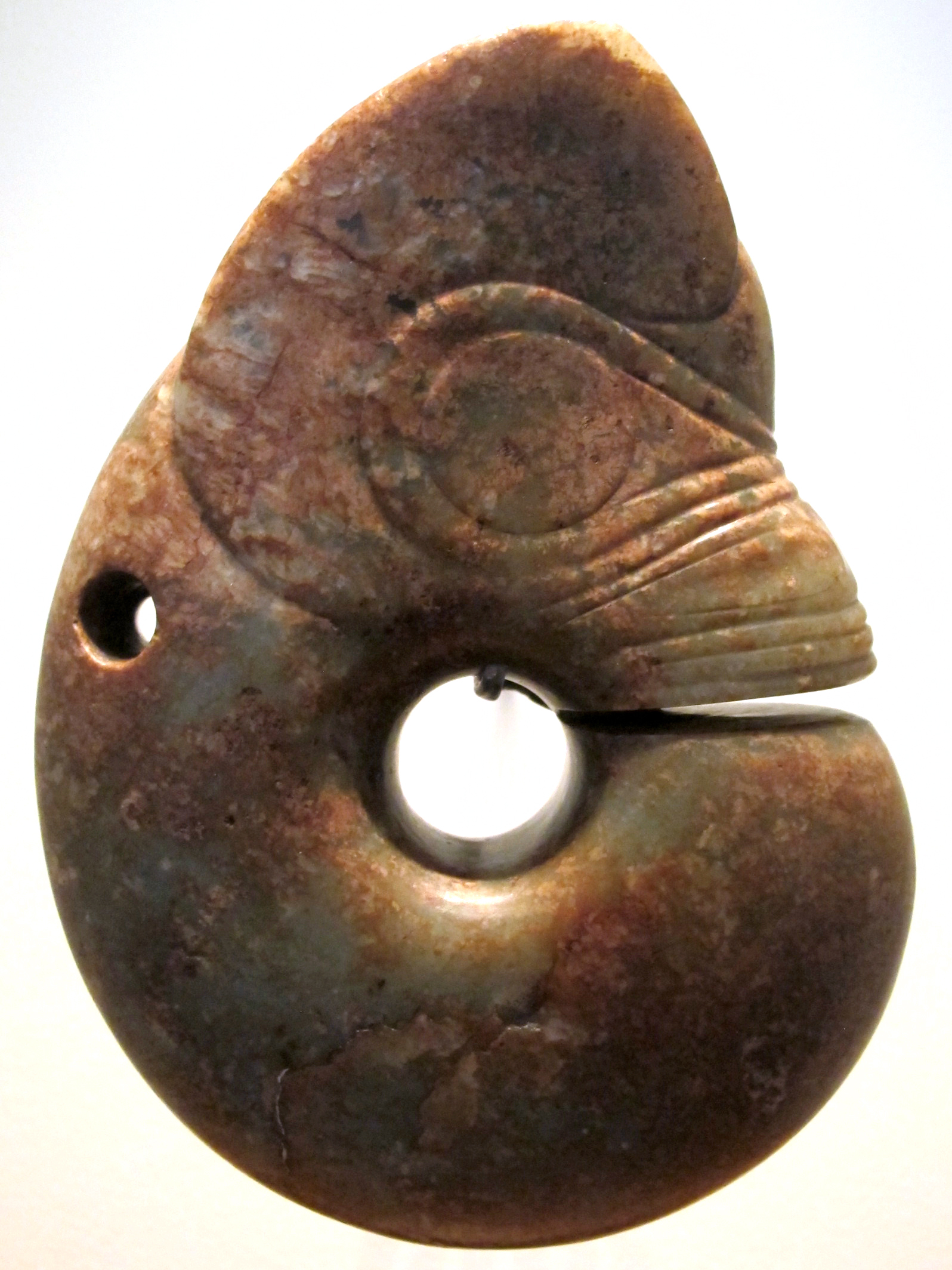
Jade artifact in the form of a pig dragon in the Paris National Museum of Asian Arts

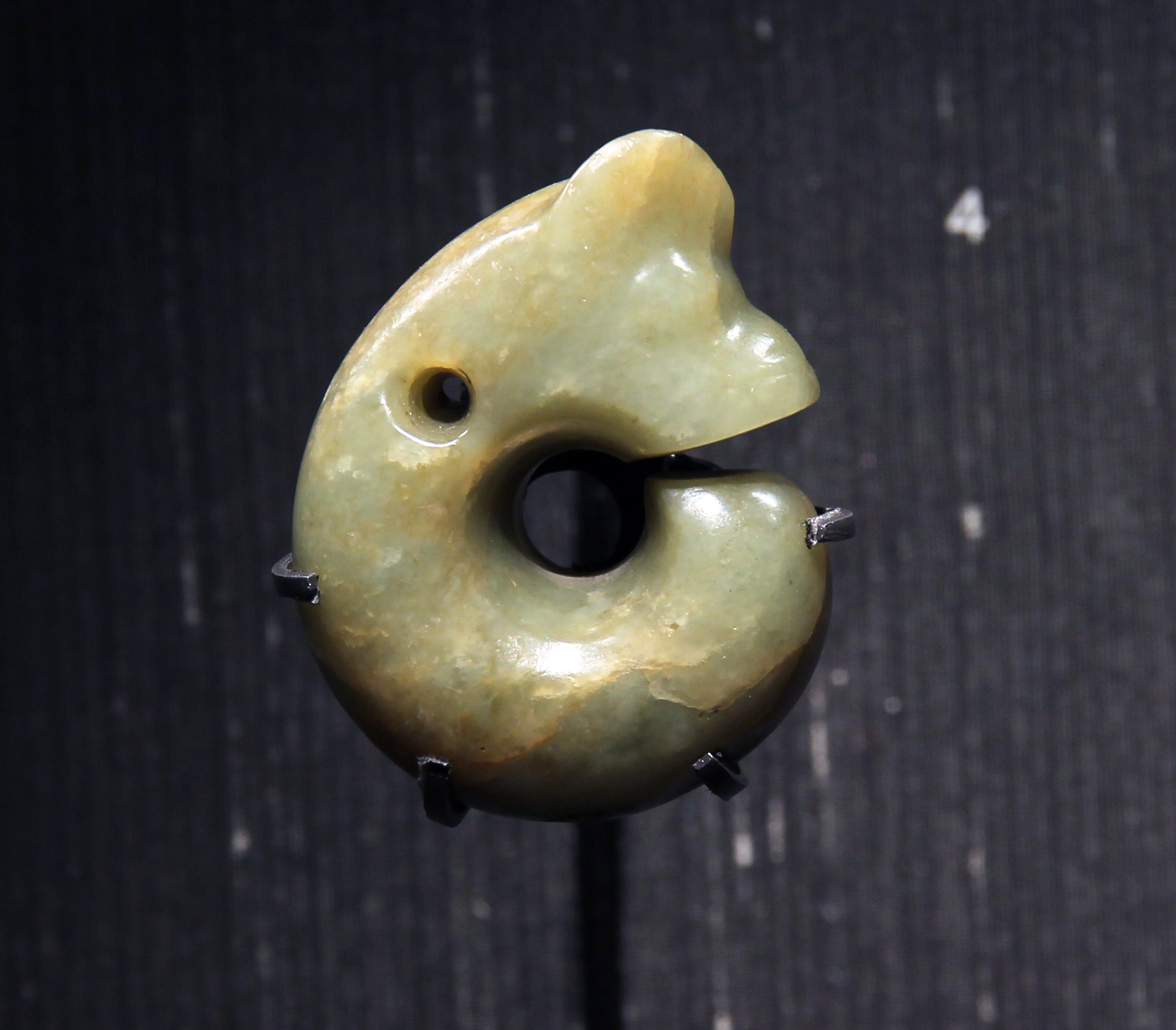
Hongshan culture pig dragon jade artifact in the British Museum

A pig dragon or zhūlóng (simplified Chinese: 玉猪龙; traditional Chinese: 玉豬龍) is a type of jade artifact from the Hongshan culture of Neolithic China. Pig dragons are zoomorphic forms with a pig-like head and elongated limbless body coiled around to the head and described as "suggestively fetal". Early pig dragons are thick and stubby, and later examples have more graceful, snakelike bodies.

Pig dragons were produced by the Hongshan culture (4700 to 2900 BC). Along with the same culture's jade eagles (玉鷹), they often featured as grave goods. Pig bones have been found interred alongside humans at Hongshan burial sites, suggesting that the animal had some ritual significance.

The more abstract shape of jades represents ceremonial or symbolic interpretations of the pig dragon, rather than being literal representations.

There is some speculation that the pig dragon is the first representation of the Chinese dragon. The character for "dragon" in the earliest Chinese writing has a similar coiled form, as do later jade dragon amulets from the Shang period.

== See also ==
- Bi (jade)
- Chinese jade
- Cong (jade)
- Gogok
- Lingling-o
- Magatama
