= Shinabe clans =

Shinabe (品部) were a caste in the Yamato kingship. It is a type of Bemin clan which is dedicated to a specific occupation rather than only farming. They paid tribute to and served the Yamato government during the pre-Taika period in Japan. They lived in various places and were placed under the jurisdiction of Tomomo-zukuri (Tomomo-no-miyazuko). They were sometimes called by the name of their tribute or occupation, and sometimes by the name of the banzo in charge of them. When the banzo was powerful, they were considered to be private citizens. Under the decree system, they were liberated and most of them became civilians.

According to legend, they descended from Tamanooya-no-Mikoto.

== History ==
In the pre-Taika period, they were led by powerful clans such as the Banzo, and provided various goods and labor to the Imperial Court (Yamato Kingdom). It is also said that many of the groups of engineers who came to Japan after the latter half of the 5th century belonged to the Shinabe clan. After the Taika Reform, some of them were abolished, but the rest were reorganized and attached to government officials, who were obliged to produce luxury goods for the court and industrial products requiring special technology as part of tribute. In the staff ordinances within the Taihō ordinances, the affiliated government offices, the name of the product department, and the legal number of units were each defined as follows.

- Library - paper door (50)
- Gagaku-ryo - Gagaku (49), Kioto (8), Nara-fueki (9)
- Zouheiji - Zoukou - Zoukoudo...Tsume-kou (18), Tatehou (36), Bunbaku (16)
- Drum-blowers - drum-blowing doors (large angle blowers) (218)
- Chusenji - Funado (Funamorido) (100)
- Main falconer - falconer's door (falconry door) (17)
- Okura-sho - Komainoto...Oshikaido Komainoto (5), Takeshido Komainoto (7), Murakami Komainoto (30), Miyagun Komainoto (14), Dai Komainome (6), Koromoome (21), Asuka Kutsumi (12), Kuretokosaku (2), Futaumi (11), Okasami (33), Suddenly Saku (72)
- Lacquer Master - Lacquer Department...Lacquer (15), Claywork (10), Leatherwork (4)
- Weaving: Nishiki Twill Weaving (110), Kofuku Department (7), Kawauchi Kunihiro Silk Weavers, etc. (350), Scarlet Dyeing (70), Indigo Dyeing (33)
- Ōzenshoku - Zoukido...Ukai (37), Ejin (87), Amibiki (150), Mishou (20)
- Otsukuryo-Otsukurido (25)
- Otakiryo-Yakudo (75), Nyudo (50)
- Zōzakeji-Sakeido (185)
- Sonokoji - Sonoto (300)
- Earthworks - mud (51)
- Shusuiji - Hido (Mito) (114)

As for their status, they were considered to be good citizens like ordinary citizens (peasants), but their status was slightly inferior to that of ordinary citizens. However, they were less subordinate to the government, and were registered in the family register of their place of residence on the same basis as ordinary citizens, so there was almost no discrimination in treatment between them and ordinary citizens. In addition to the regular members who inherited their duties and status, there were also temporary members who were incorporated from the general public. In other cases, one person per household either worked in shifts for a certain period of time, or was temporarily assigned by the government to perform labor or pay a certain amount of tribute. In exchange, they were exempted from some or all of their household duties and were also excluded from military service.。

In the Nara period, in Yōrō 5 (721), the chief hawks were abolished, and in Tenpyō-hōji 3 (759), all hinto except for highly skilled "sekkyo-sōdensha" were, in principle, abolished and incorporated into the public domain. In 759, in principle, Shinto houses other than those for highly skilled "sekkyo-soden" were abolished and incorporated into public houses (treated as ordinary citizens). In the Heian period, only the Kofukishi of the Hyogo Dormitory were included in the Enkishiki. This is thought to have been due to a complicated combination of factors: the fact that the old tribal system itself was incompatible with the Ritsuryo system; the fact that the decline of the Ritsuryo system made it difficult to maintain the tribal system; and the fact that the improvement of socioeconomic standards made it possible to procure and hire services from the private sector (in this case, the private sector included those procured from the former tribal merchants and traders). In this case, the private sector included the commercial and industrial sectors of the former Shinbu.

In academic circles, it is sometimes referred to as Shinabe Zakkosei together with the similar organization of Zakkosei, but Zakkosei were engaged in military-related technical labor and had their own family registers that were different from the general family registers, and the legal status difference between them and the public was stronger than that of Shinabe. The legal status difference between them and the public is said to be stronger than that of the Shinabe.

== Clans ==
=== Fuhito clan ===
The Fuhitobe (史部), were a caste in Japan during the Kofun period. They were a Shinabe clan who were engaged in duties related to writing at the Yamato Imperial Court. Most of them were thought to be descended from Toraijin or people who came to Japan from the continent or peninsula. Unlike the general nobles, they were given the family name "Fuhito" (史).

The duties of the Fuhitobe included taking charge of records and documents during the period before the Taika era (618-867).

In the Chinese context, the term "Shibu" of the same Kanji (史部) is also used to refer to one of the four divisions of literature, known as the Shi division, which includes historical books and geography.

== Bibliography ==
- Kikuo Arai, "Shinabe" ("Encyclopedia of Japanese History 3" (Heibonsha, 1993) ISBN 978-4-582-13103-1)
- Masaaki Ueda, "Shinabe, Zodo" (Encyclopedia of Social Sciences 14 (Kajima Institute Press, 1974) ISBN 978-4-306-09165-8)
- Jinno Seiichi (1997-02-01). Genealogy of the View of Low and Highborn. History and Culture Library (in Japanese). Vol. 8. Tokyo, Bunkyo-ku: Yoshikawa Kōbunkan. ISBN 4-642-05408-1.
- Kimio Kumagai, "Pinabe" and "Pinabe and Zodo System" in Dictionary of National History 7 (Yoshikawa Kōbunkan, 1986) ISBN 978-4-642-00507-4
