= D. C. Holtom =

American ethnologist

- Born: Daniel Clarence Holtom; July 7, 1884
- Died: August 17, 1962 (aged 78)
- Occupation: Ethnologist

Academic background
- Education: University of Chicago

Academic work
- Main interests: Shinto

Daniel Clarence Holtom (July 7, 1884 – August 17, 1962) was an American ethnologist and specialist on Japan.

== Education ==
Holtom gained an AB from Kalamazoo College in 1907, a BD from Newton Theological Seminary and a PhD in History from the University of Chicago. He was also awarded honorary degrees from Kalamazoo and Brown University.

== Career ==
Holtom was sent to Japan by the American Baptist Foreign Mission Society and was Professor of Modern Languages at Tokyo Gakuin during 1914–1915. He was then Professor of Church History at Japan Baptist Theological Seminary from 1915 to 1925, Professor of History at Kanto Gakuin from 1926 to 1936 and Dean of Theology at Aoyama Gakuin from 1936 until 1940.

He was in Japan when Emperor Hirohito was enthroned and wrote a history of Japanese coronations titled The Japanese Enthronement Ceremonies (1928).

== Reception ==
The Professor of Shinto at Tokyo Imperial University, Katō Genchi (加藤玄智), praised The Japanese Enthronement Ceremonies as "a fine piece of work with the right man in the right place...[it] makes good use of the expositions of our historians and thereby avoids falling into conjecture; at the same time out of his own original study he advances new interpretations". Robert S. Ellwood in 1969 said Holtom's study of Shinto (The National Faith of Japan) "is undoubtedly still the best general study, but its prewar provenance leaves it now rather dated, and there is not enough depth of material on rite and symbol to satisfy a history of religions approach".

Douglas G. Haring stated that Holtom was:

...the foremost American student of Shinto...[his] meticulous studies of Japanese folk religion belong among the classics of anthropological research. No other foreigner—and few Japanese—achieved his command of the indigenous literature plus untiring field observation...The fact that he was invited to deliver a course of lectures on Shinto history at Kokugakuin (National Academy) in Tokyo, where Shinto priests were trained, speaks for itself. Japanese religious leaders admired his scholarship and trusted his integrity.

== Works ==
- The Japanese Enthronement Ceremonies (1928)
- The National Faith of Japan : A Study in Modern Shinto (London: Kegan Paul, Trench, Trubner, 1938)
- Modern Japan and Shinto Nationalism (1943; rev. ed. 1947)
