= Hiregasaki Station =

Railway station in Nagareyama, Chiba Prefecture, Japan

Hiregasaki Station 鰭ヶ崎駅
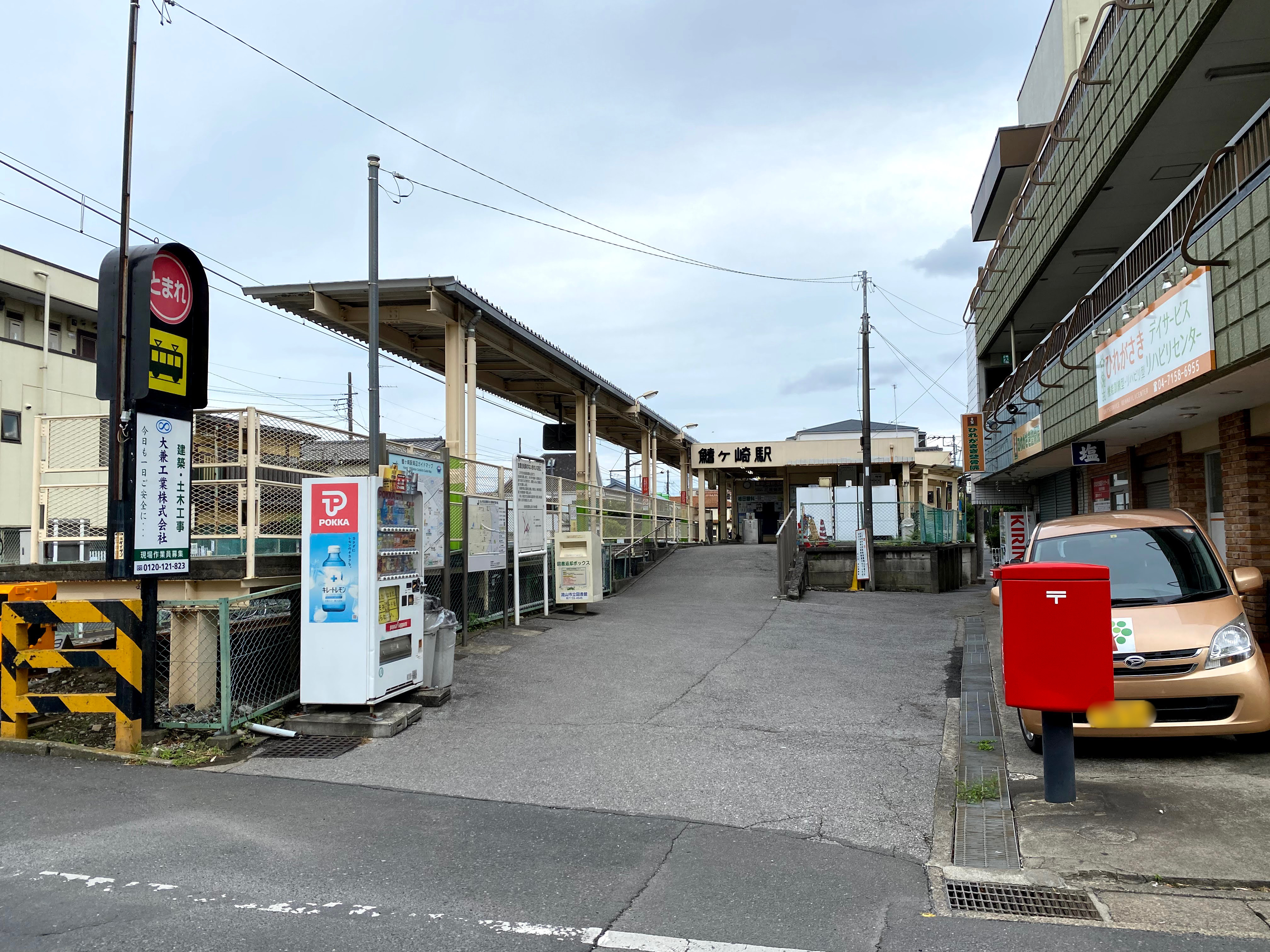
- Hiregasaki Station, June 2021

General information
- Location: Hiregasaki, Nagareyama-shi, Chiba-ken 270-0161; Japan
- Coordinates: 35.8411°N 139.9108°E
- Operator: Ryūtetsu
- Line: ■ Nagareyama Line
- Distance: 3.6 km from Mabashi
- Platforms: 1 side platform

Other information
- Status: Staffed
- Station code: RN4
- Website: Official website

History
- Opened: March 14, 1916

Passengers
- FY2019: 1153 daily

Services
Preceding station	Ryutetsu	Following station
Kogane-Jōshi towards Mabashi	Nagareyama Line	Heiwadai towards Nagareyama
Location
- Location within Chiba Prefecture Location within Japan

Hiregasaki Station (鰭ヶ崎駅, Hiregasaki-eki) is a passenger railway station located in the city of Nagareyama, Chiba Prefecture, Japan operated by the private railway operator Ryūtetsu. It is numbered station RN4.

== Lines ==
Hiregasaki Station is served by the Nagareyama Line, and is located 3.6 km from the official starting point of the line at Mabashi Station.

== Station layout ==
The station consists of one side platform serving a single bi-directional track. The station in staffed.

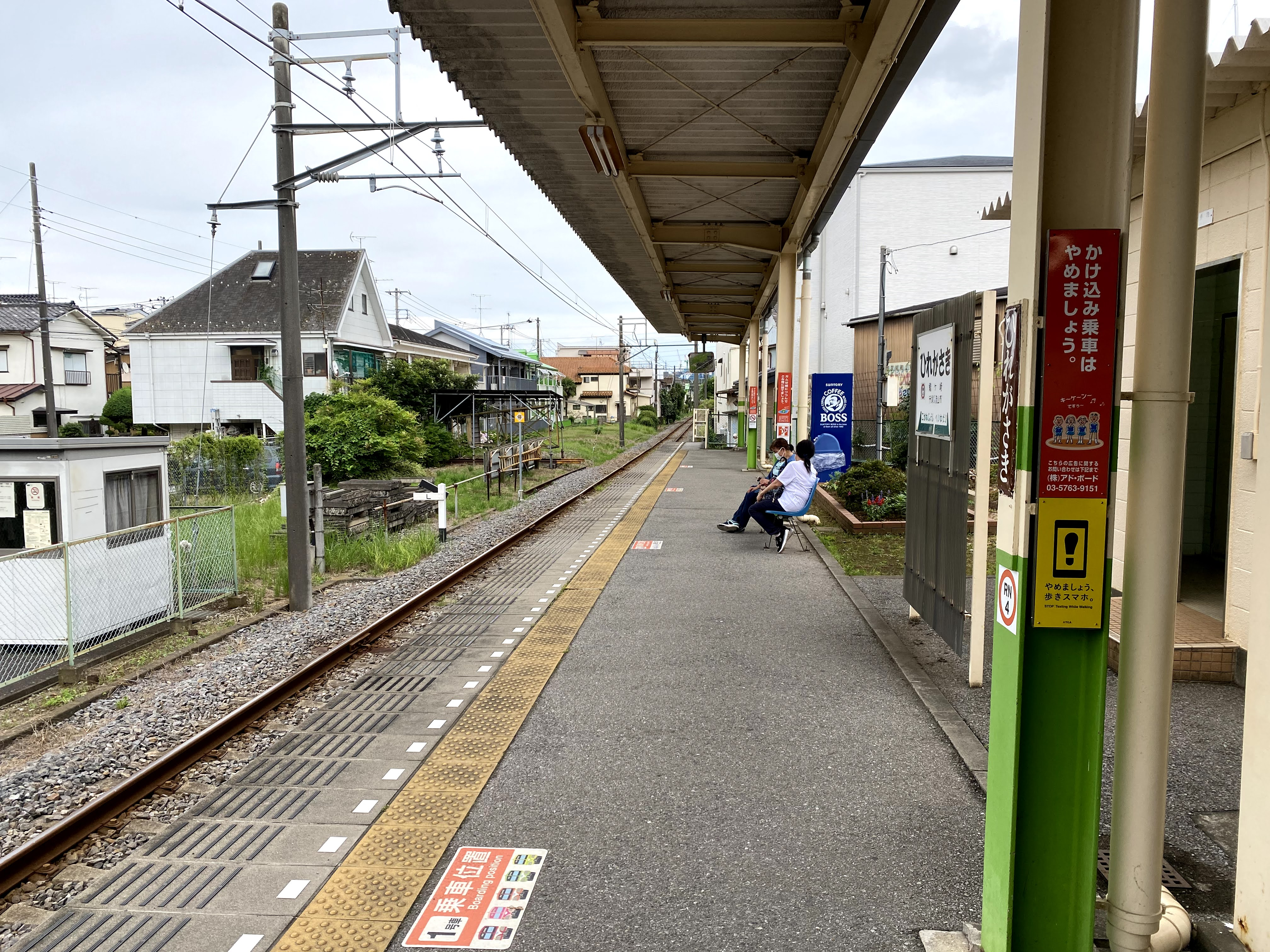
Platform view for Mabashi

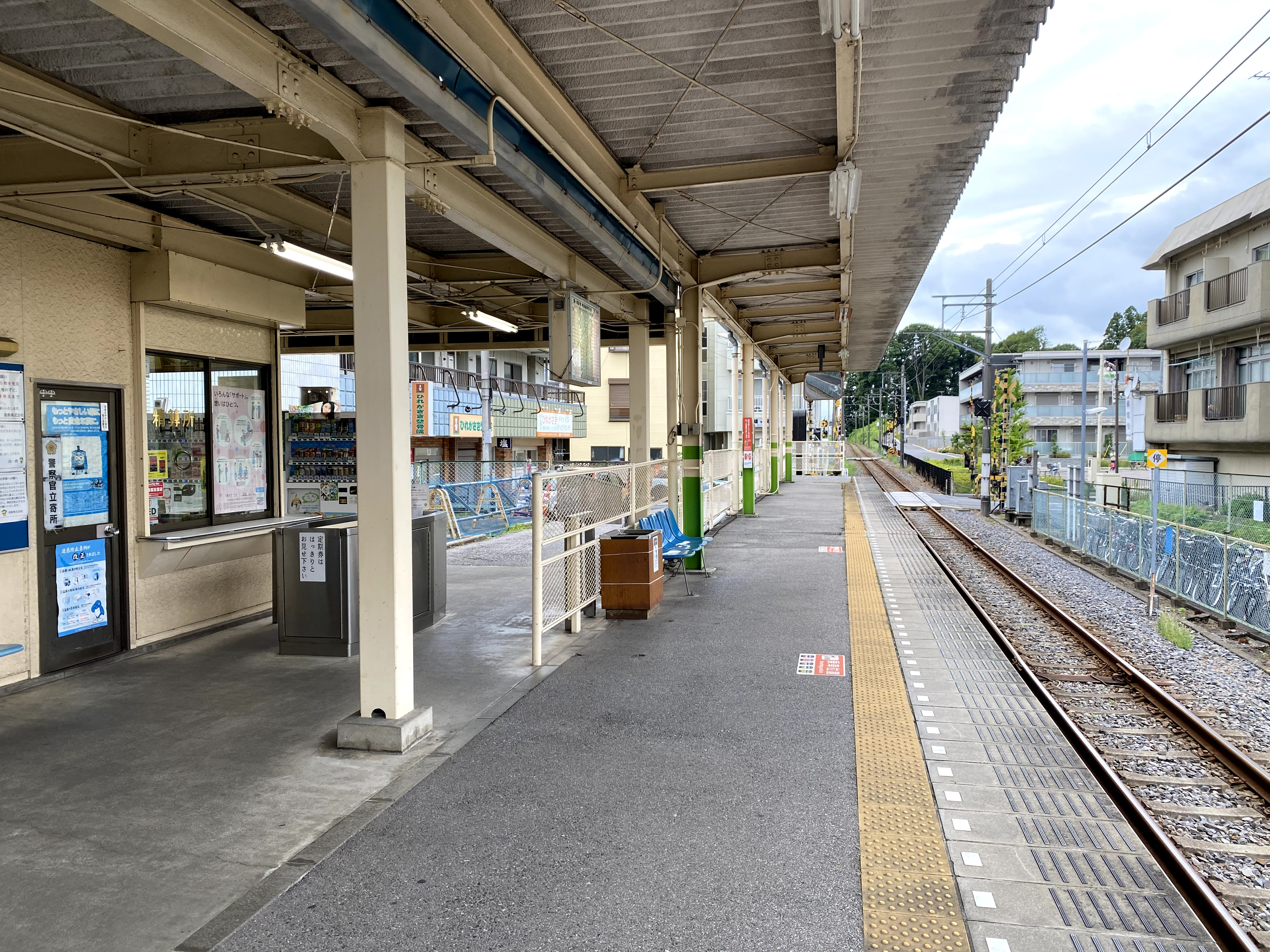
Platform view for Nagareyama

== History ==
Hiregasaki Station was opened on March 14, 1916.

== Passenger statistics ==
In fiscal 2018, the station was used by an average of 1150 passengers daily.

== Surrounding area ==
- Minami-Nagareyama Station
- Toyo Gakuen University

== See also ==
- List of railway stations in Japan
