= Kogane-Jōshi Station =

Railway station in Matsudo, Chiba Prefecture, Japan

Kogane-Jōshi Station 小金城趾駅
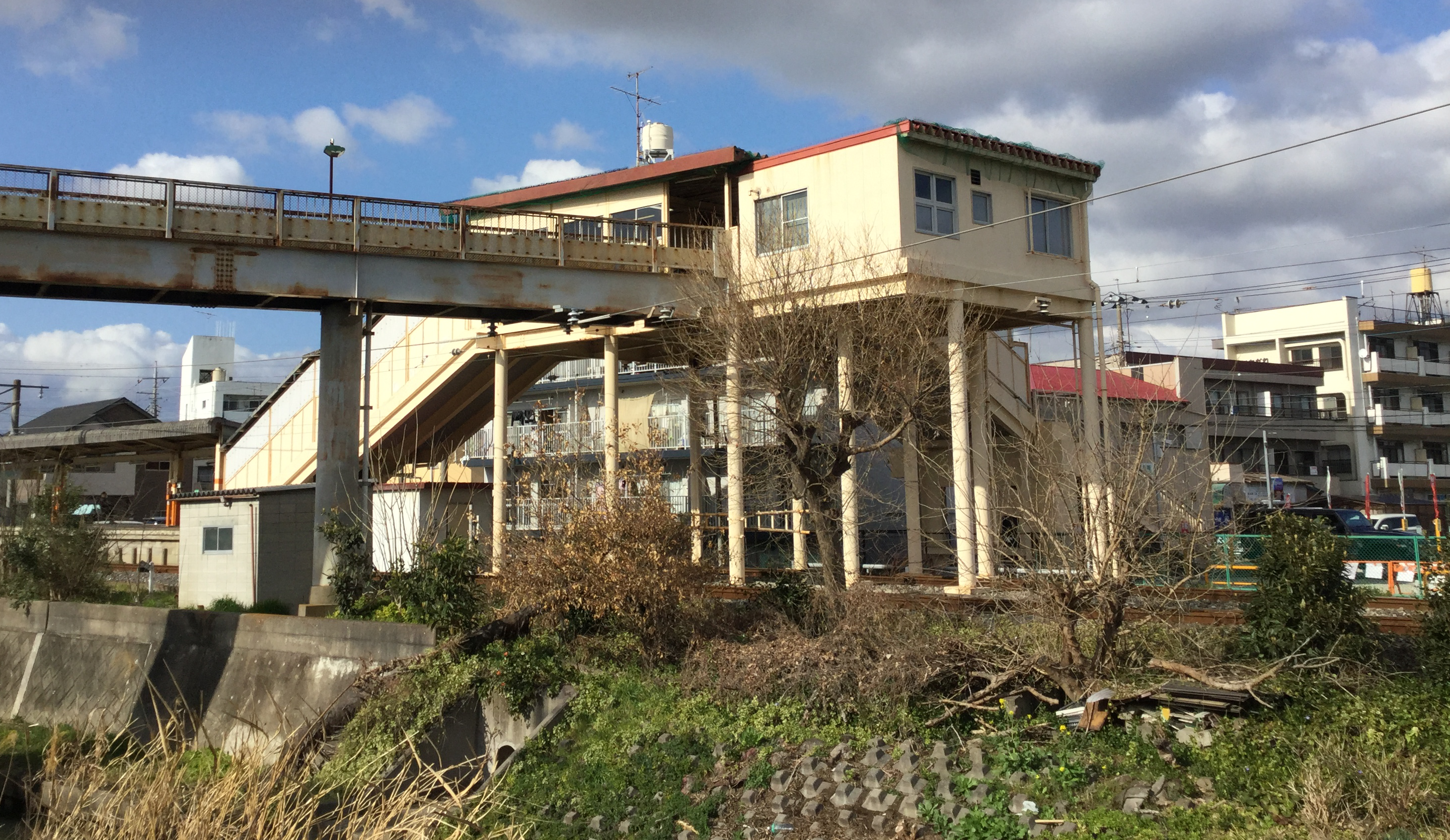
- Kogane-Jōshi Station in March 2020

General information
- Location: 4-Koganedaira, Matsudo-shi, Chiba-ken 270-0006; Japan
- Coordinates: 35.8357°N 139.9174°E
- Operator: Ryūtetsu
- Line: ■ Nagareyama Line
- Distance: 2.8 km from Mabashi
- Platforms: 1 island platform

Other information
- Station code: RN3
- Website: Official website

History
- Opened: December 24, 1953

Passengers
- FY2018: 1629 daily

Services
Preceding station	Ryutetsu	Following station
Kōya towards Mabashi	Nagareyama Line	Hiregasaki towards Nagareyama
Location
- Location within Chiba Prefecture Location within Japan

Kogane-Jōshi Station (小金城趾駅, Kogane-Jōshi-eki) is a passenger railway station located in the city of Matsudo, Chiba Prefecture, Japan operated by the private railway operator Ryūtetsu. It is numbered station RN3.

== Lines ==
Kogane-Jōshi Station is served by the Nagareyama Line, and is located 2.8 km from the official starting point of the line at Mabashi Station.

== Station layout ==
The station consists of one island platform connected to the station building by a footbridge.

=== Nagareyama Line ===
1	■ Nagareyama Line	for Mabashi
2	■ Nagareyama Line	for Nagareyama

== History ==
Kogane-Jōshi Station was opened on December 24, 1953.

== Passenger statistics ==
In fiscal 2018, the station was used by an average of 1629 passengers daily.

== Surrounding area ==
- Chiba Aiyukai Memorial Hospital
- Chiba Prefectural Kogane High School
- Matsudo City Kogane Junior High School

== See also ==
- List of railway stations in Japan
