= Kōya Station (Chiba) =

Railway station in Matsudo, Chiba Prefecture, Japan

Kōya Station 幸谷駅
- Kōya Station

General information
- Location: 1-Chome Shinmatsudo, Matsudo-shi, Chiba-ken 270-0034; Japan
- Coordinates: 35.8266°N 139.9199°E
- Operator: Ryūtetsu
- Line: ■ Nagareyama Line
- Distance: 1.7 km from Mabashi
- Platforms: 1 side platform

Other information
- Station code: RN2
- Website: Official website

History
- Opened: February 3, 1961

Passengers
- FY2018: 4590 daily

Services
Preceding station	Ryutetsu	Following station
Mabashi Terminus	Nagareyama Line	Kogane-Jōshi towards Nagareyama
Location
- Location within Chiba Prefecture Location within Japan

Kōya Station (幸谷駅, Kōya-eki) is a passenger railway station located in the city of Matsudo, Chiba Prefecture, Japan operated by the private railway operator Ryūtetsu. It is numbered station RN2.

== Lines ==
Kōya Station is served by the Nagareyama Line, and is located 1.7 km from the official starting point of the line at Mabashi Station.

== Station layout ==
The station consists of one side platform serving single bi-directional track.

== History ==
Kōya Station was opened on February 3, 1961

== Passenger statistics ==
In fiscal 2018, the station was used by an average of 4590 passengers daily.

== Surrounding area ==
- Shin-Matsudo Station
- Matsudo City Hall Shinmatsudo Branch
- Shinmatsudo Central General Hospital

== See also ==
- List of railway stations in Japan
