= Kita-Matsudo Station =

Railway station in Matsudo, Chiba Prefecture, Japan

JL23 Kita-Matsudo Station 北松戸駅
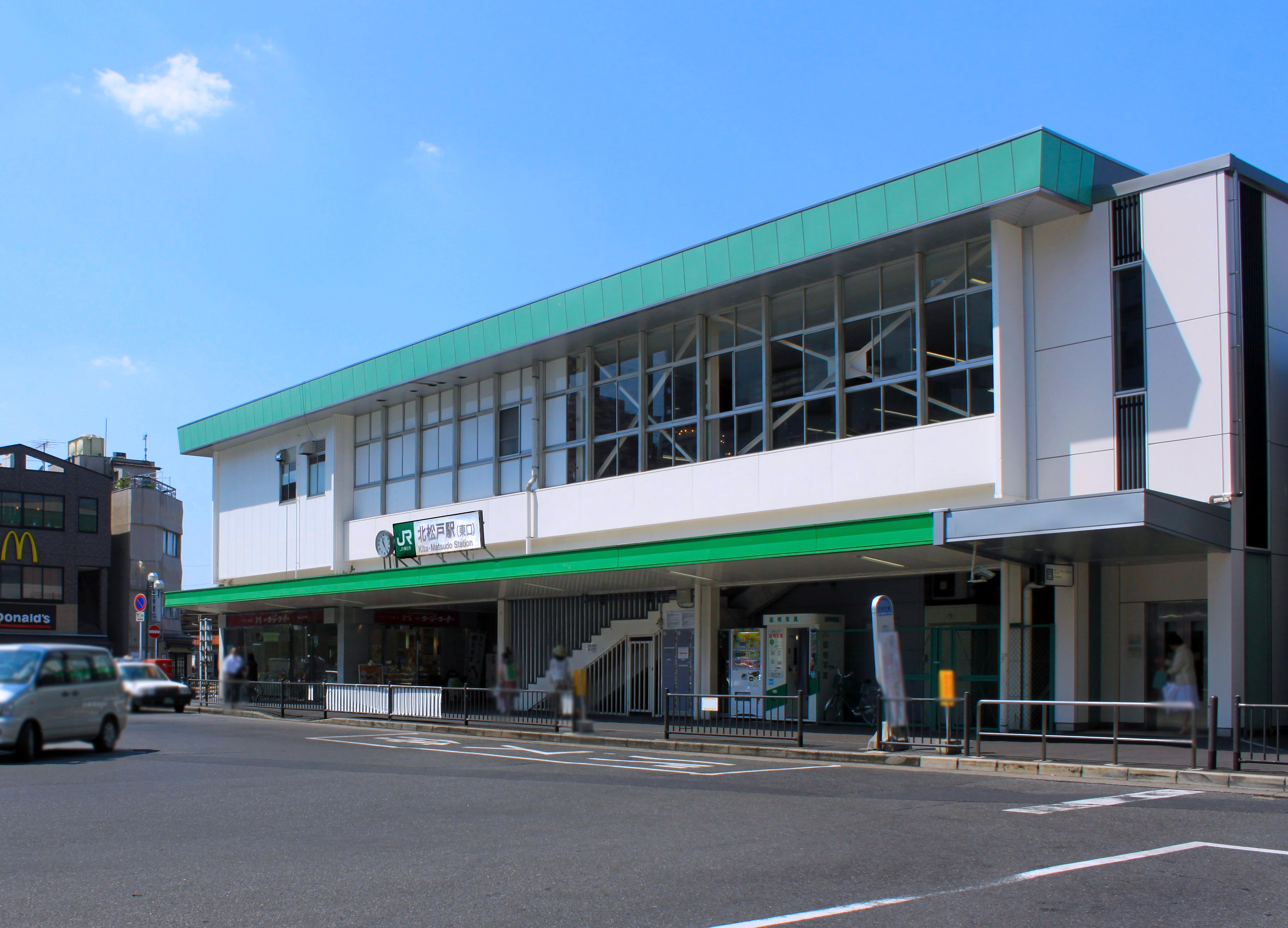
- Kita-Matsudo Station, September 2010

General information
- Location: 905 Kamihongō, Matsudo-shi, Chiba-ken 271-0064; Japan
- Coordinates: 35.8004°N 139.9113°E
- Operator: JR East
- Line: Jōban Line (Local)
- Distance: 17.8 km from Nippori
- Platforms: 1 island platform

Other information
- Status: Staffed
- Station code: JL23
- Website: www.jreast.co.jp/estation/station/info.aspx?StationCd=588

History
- Opened: May 1, 1952
- Former names: Matsudo Keibajōmae (until 1958)

Passengers
- FY2019: 21,606 daily

Services
Preceding station	JR East	Following station
Matsudo JL22 towards Ayase	Jōban Line (Local) Local-Kankō	Mabashi JL24 towards Toride
Location
- Location within Chiba Prefecture Location within Japan

Kita-Matsudo Station (北松戸駅, Kita-Matsudo-eki) is a passenger railway station in the city of Matsudo, Chiba, Japan, operated by East Japan Railway Company (JR East).

== Lines ==
Kita-Matsudo Station is served by the Jōban Line from Ueno in Tokyo and is 17.8 km from the terminus of the line at Nippori Station in Tokyo.. Only all-stations "Local" services stop here.

== Station layout ==
The station consists of a single island platform serving two tracks, connected by a footbridge. The station is staffed.

=== Platforms ===
1	Jōban Line (Local)	for Shim-Matsudo, Kashiwa, and Toride
2	Jōban Line (Local)	for Matsudo, Ayase; Tokyo Metro Chiyoda Line for Kita-senju, Nishi-nippori and Yoyogi-uehara

== History ==
Kita-Matsudo Station was opened on May 1, 1952 as Matsudo Keibajōmae Station (松戸競輪場前, Matsudo Keibajōmae-eki), a temporary station on the Japanese National Railways (JNR). The station was used only on race days for the adjacent Matsudo Racetracks. It was elevated to a permanent station on December 25, 1958. The station was absorbed into the JR East network upon the privatization of JNR on April 1, 1987.

== Passenger statistics ==
In fiscal 2019, the station was used by an average of 21,606 passengers daily.

== Surrounding area ==
- Matsudo Race Tracks
- Senshu University Matsudo Junior High School / High School / Kindergarten

== See also ==
- List of railway stations in Japan
