= Mabashi =

Mabashi (馬橋) may refer to:

- Mabashi Station, a train station in Matsudo, Chiba
- Mabashi (Bleach), a character in the Bleach anime series
