= Heiwadai Station =

Heiwadai Station is the name of two train stations in Japan:

- Heiwadai Station (Chiba)
- Heiwadai Station (Tokyo)
