= Matsudo =

Matsudo 松戸市
- City
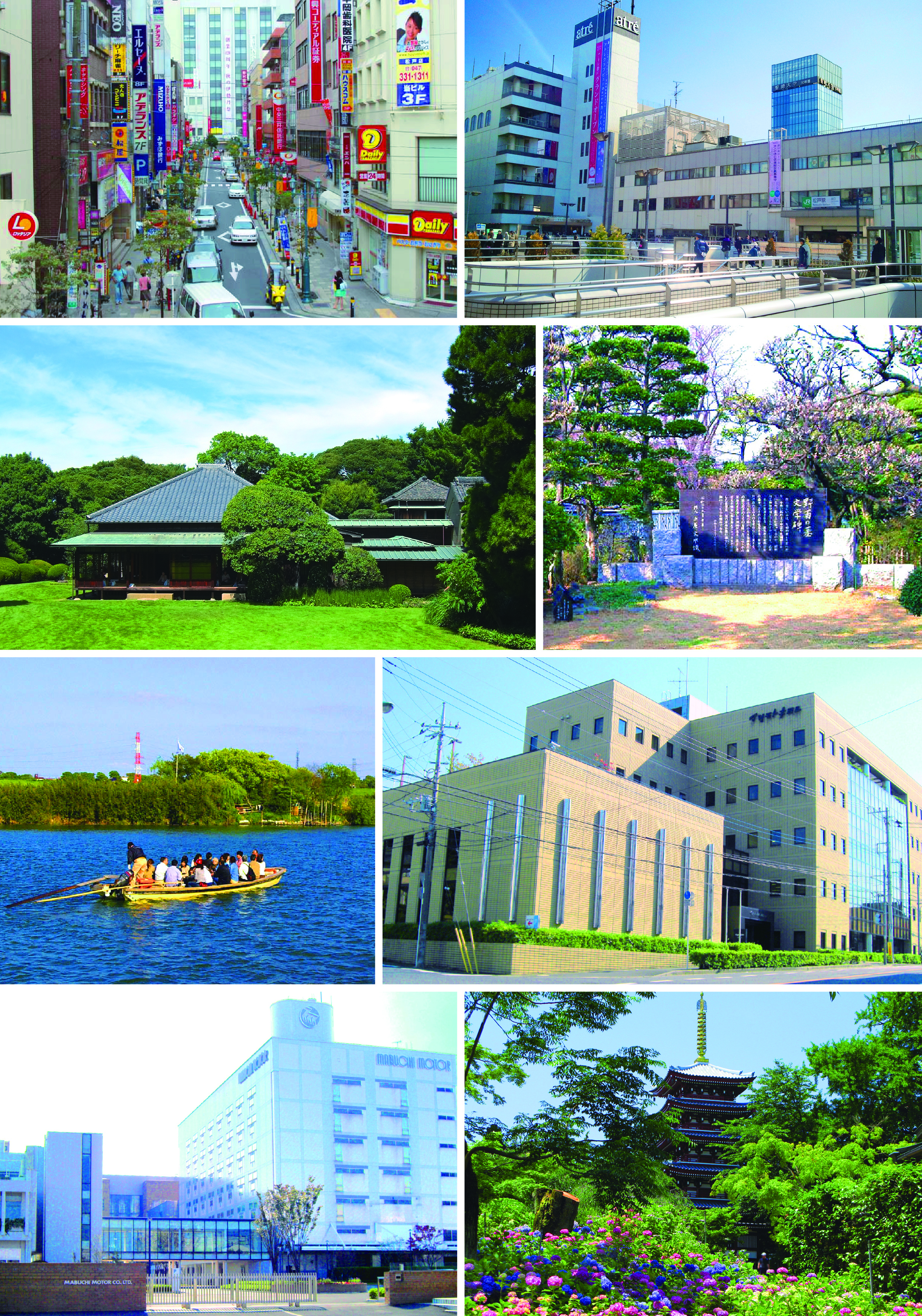
Isetan Street	Matsudo Station
Tojo-tei Tokugawa residence	Grave of Nogiku
Yakiri Ferry	Matsumotokiyoshi head office
Mabuchi Motor head office	Hondo-ji
- Flag Seal

- Location of Matsudo in Chiba Prefecture

- Coordinates: 35°47′15.5″N 139°54′11.4″E
- Country: Japan
- Region: Kantō
- Prefecture: Chiba
- Town Settled: April 1, 1889
- City Settled: April 1, 1943

Government
  - Mayor: Takamasa Matsudo (since June 2025)

Area
  - Total: 61.38 km^{2} (23.70 sq mi)

Population (November 30, 2020)
  - Total: 498,575
  - Density: 8,123/km^{2} (21,040/sq mi)
- Time zone: UTC+9 (Japan Standard Time)
- -Tree: Castanopsis, eucalyptus, sakura, Pyrus pyrifolia
- Flower: Azalea, hydrangea and Asteroideae
- Bird: Ural owl, barn swallow and white heron
- Phone number: 047-366-1111
- Address: 387-5, Nemoto, Matsudo-shi, Chiba-ken 271-8588
- Website: Official website

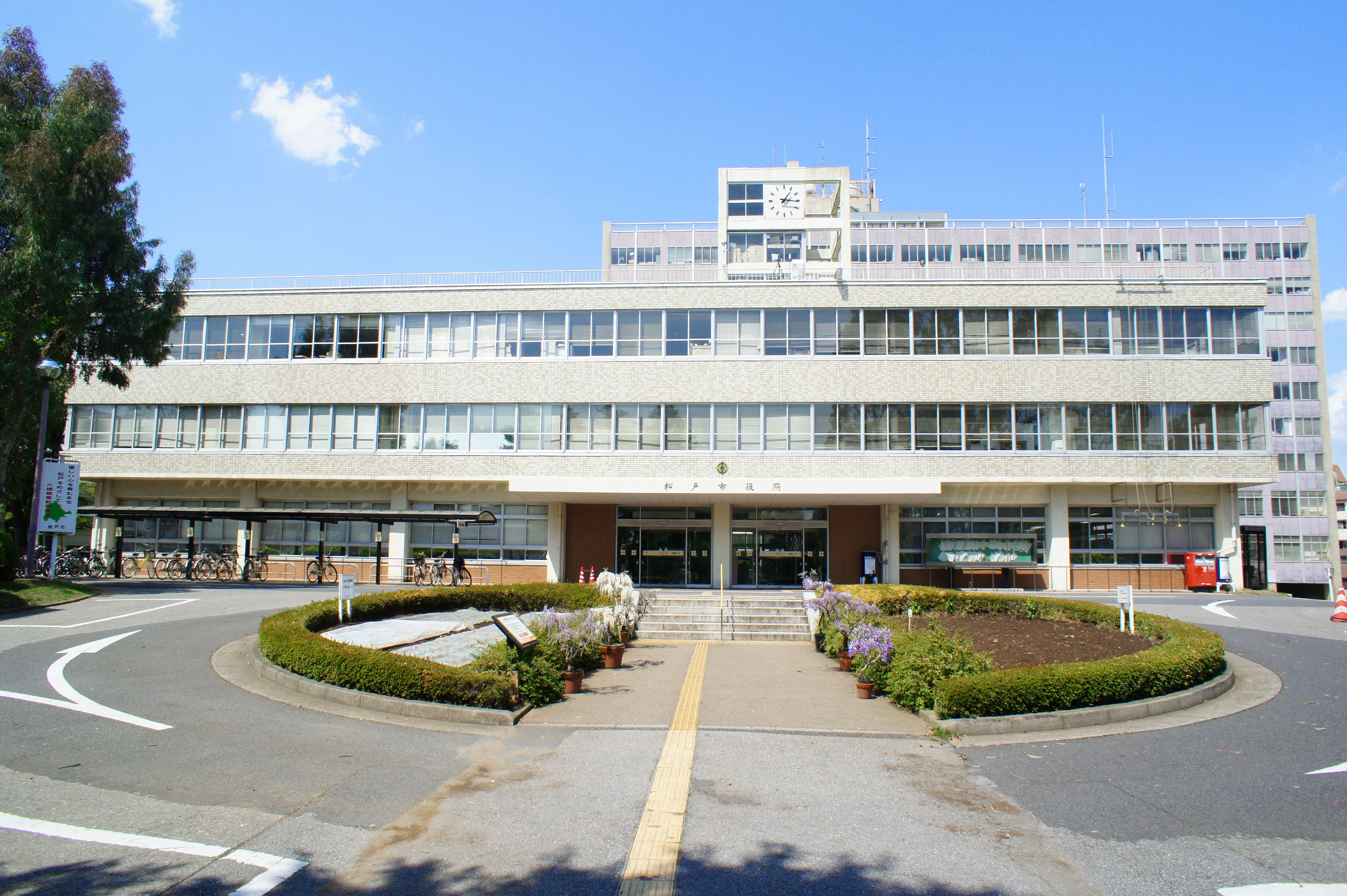
Matsudo City Hall

Matsudo (松戸市, Matsudo-shi) is a city in Chiba Prefecture, Japan. As of 1 October 2024, the city had an estimated population of 499,533 in 242,918 households and a population density of 8,138 persons per km^{2}. The total area of the city is 61.38 square kilometres (23.70 sq mi).

== Geography ==
Matsudo is located in the far northwestern corner of Chiba Prefecture, about 20 to 30 kilometers from the prefectural capital of Chiba and 10 to 20 kilometers from downtown Tokyo. The western border of the city is the Edo River, which flows from north to south, and most of the city lies on an alluvial plain with an elevation of around four meters above sea level, with the eastern end rising to 20 to 30 meters on the Shimōsa Plateau. The city has approximate dimensions of 11.4 kilometers from east to west and 11.6 kilometers from north to south.

=== Neighboring municipalities ===
Chiba Prefecture

- Ichikawa
- Kamagaya
- Kashiwa
- Nagareyama

Saitama Prefecture

- Misato

Tokyo

- Edogawa
- Katsushika

=== Climate ===
Matsudo has a humid subtropical climate (Köppen Cfa) characterized by warm summers and cool winters with light to no snowfall. The average annual temperature in Matsudo is 15.0 °C. The average annual rainfall is 1399 mm with October as the wettest month. The temperatures are highest on average in August, at around 26.4 °C, and lowest in January, at around 3.7 °C.

== Demographics ==
Per Japanese census data, the population of Matsudo increased very rapidly in the 1960s and 1970s and has continued to grow at a slower pace since.

Historical population
Year	Pop.	±%
1950	59,670	—
1960	86,372	+44.7%
1970	253,591	+193.6%
1980	400,863	+58.1%
1990	456,210	+13.8%
2000	464,841	+1.9%
2010	484,457	+4.2%
2020	498,232	+2.8%

== History ==
The area around Matsudo has been inhabited since prehistoric times, with stone tools dating to approximately 35,000–32,000 years ago. Archaeologists have found remains from the Jōmon period, as well as burial tumuli from the Kofun period. During the Edo period, the area was tenryō controlled directly by the Tokugawa shogunate, and contained a number of horse ranches providing war horses for the Shōgun's armies. It also developed as a post station on the Mito Kaidō connecting Edo with Mito, and supplied vegetables and the produce to Edo via its waterways. Matsudo Shrine has a close connection with Tokugawa Mitsukuni and the Matsudo Tojo was the residence of Tokugawa Akitake, the last daimyō of Mito Domain after the Meiji restoration.

Matsudo Town was created in Higashikatsushika District Chiba Prefecture with the establishment of the modern municipalities system on April 1, 1889. Matsudo attained city status on October 1, 1943.

On September 1, 1954, the neighboring town of Kashiwa merged with neighboring Kogane Town and Tsuchi and Tanaka villages to form the new city of Tokatsu (東葛市, Tokatsu-shi). However, many politicians in Kogane Town were vehemently opposed to the merger, and forced its dissolution on October 15, 1954 with most of former Kogane Town merging with Matsudo instead. Beginning in the 1960s, the rapid economic growth in Japan (and the Tokyo area in particular) led to a construction boom in Matsudo and the development of the area as a major suburb of Tokyo. Matsudo is now the fourth-largest city in Chiba Prefecture and a major bedroom community in the Greater Tokyo Area.

== Government ==
Matsudo has a mayor-council form of government with a directly elected mayor and a unicameral city council of 44 members. Matsudo contributes seven members to the Chiba Prefectural Assembly. In terms of national politics, the city is divided between the Chiba 6th district and the Chiba 7th district of the lower house of the Diet of Japan.

== Economy ==
Matsudo is a regional commercial center and a bedroom community for nearby Chiba and Tokyo, with some 37% of the population commuting to Tokyo. Although located in Chiba Prefecture, the city has relatively poor transportation connections to Chiba City. The city has a mixed industrial base. The small electric motor manufacturer, Mabuchi Motor is headquartered in Matsudo.

== Education ==
=== Universities ===
- Chiba University, Matsudo Campus
- Nihon University, Matsudo Dental Campus
- Ryutsu Keizai University, Matsudo Campus
- Seitoku University
- Seitoku University Junior College

=== Primary and secondary education ===
Matsudo has 45 public elementary schools and 20 public junior high schools operated by the city government, and eight public high schools operated by the Chiba Prefectural Board of Education. The prefecture also operates three special education schools for the handicapped. The city also has one private elementary school, two private middle schools and two private high schools.

== Sport ==
- Velodrome: Matsudo Velodrome

== Transportation ==
=== Railway ===
JR East – Jōban Line

- Matsudo - Kita-Matsudo - Mabashi - Shim-Matsudo - Kita-Kogane

JR East – Chiyoda subway Line

- Abiko/Toride - Matsudo - YoyogiUehara

Keisei Electric Railway - Keisei Matsudo Line

- Matsudo - Kamihongō - Matsudo-Shinden - Minoridai - Yabashira - Tokiwadaira - Gokō - Motoyama

Hokusō Railway - Hokuso Line

- Yagiri - Akiyama - Higashi-Matsudo - Matsuhidai

Keisei Electric Railway - Keisei Narita Airport Line

- Higashi-Matsudo

Tobu Railway – Tobu Urban Park Line

- Mutsumi

Ryūtetsu – Nagareyama Line

- Mabashi - Kōya - Kogane-Jōshi - Hiregasaki

=== Highway ===
- Tokyo Gaikan Expressway
- National Route 6
- National Route 209
- National Route 464

== Local attractions ==
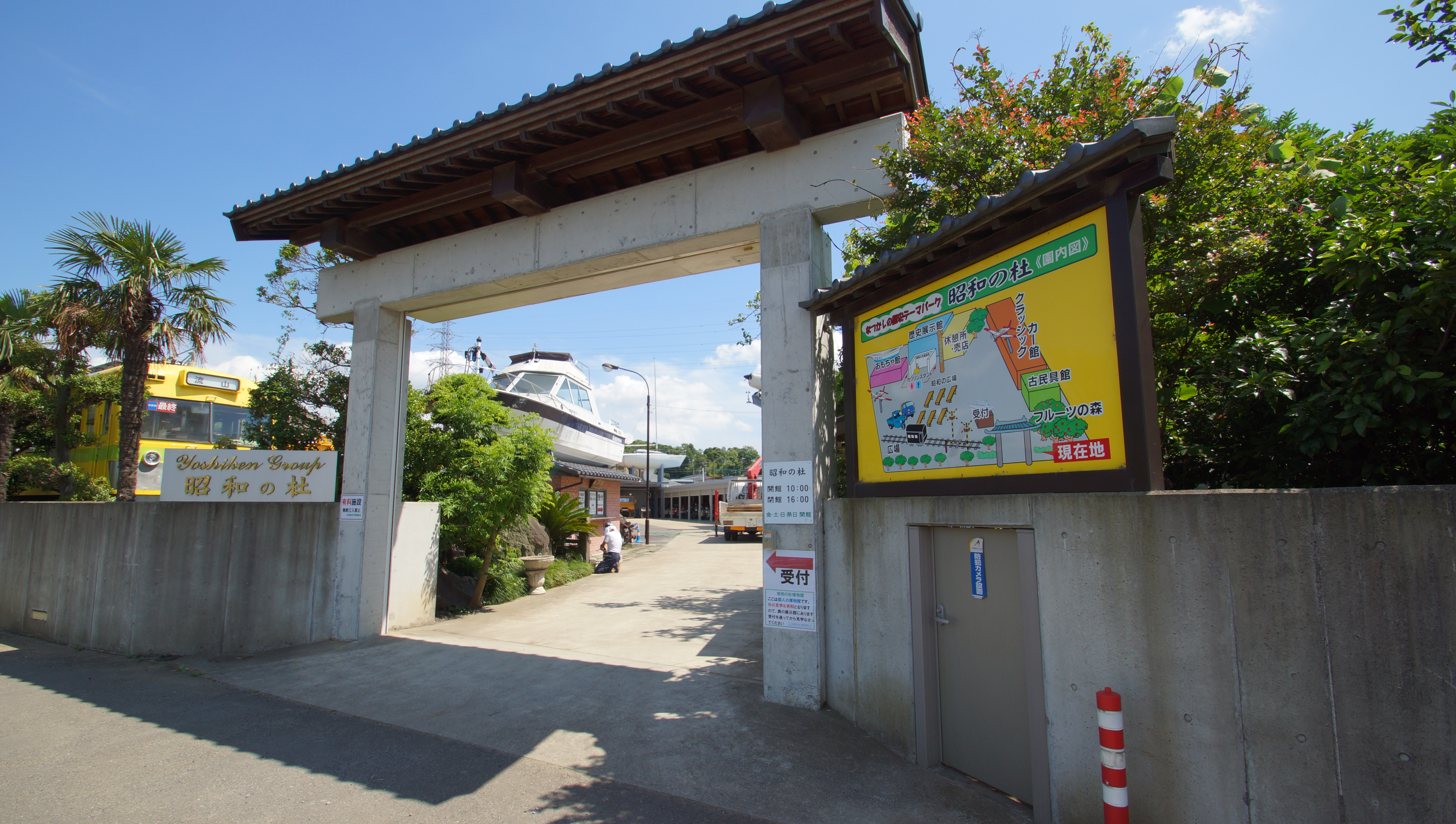
Showa no Mori Museum entrance in June 2016

- Manman-ji – Buddhist temple
- Showa no Mori Museum

== Sister cities ==
- Box Hill, Victoria, Australia, since May 12, 1971. When Box Hill amalgamated with Nunawading in December 1994, the relationship was re-affirmed with the new City of Whitehorse. A small, multi-story department store attached to Matsudo train station bears the name "Box Hill".
- Kurayoshi, Tottori, Japan

== Notable people from Matsudo ==
- Sadao Abe, actor, musician
- Sayaka Akimoto, singer, actress, former AKB48 member
- Gen, actor
- Shūichi Higurashi, manga illustrator
- Hiroshi Kamiya, voice actor
- Akiyuki Kido, figure skater
- Takeshi Kimura, businessman and racing driver
- Yasunori Matsumoto, voice actor
- Haruko Obokata, stem-cell biologist
- Yuki Ohashi, professional soccer player
- Masato Sasaki, professional soccer player
- Matsunobori Shigeo, sumo wrestler
- Yuji Unozawa, professional soccer player
- Yutaka Wada, professional baseball player
- Hideaki Wakui, professional baseball player
- Hiromichi Watanabe, Politician (Minister for Reconstruction)
- Naoko Yamazaki, astronaut
- Tsutomu Yamazaki, actor
- Rachid Muratake, track and field athlete
