= Seitoku University Junior College =

Private junior college in Chiba Prefecture, Japan

Coordinates: 35°47′0.71″N 139°54′17.92″E

- 聖徳大学短期大学部
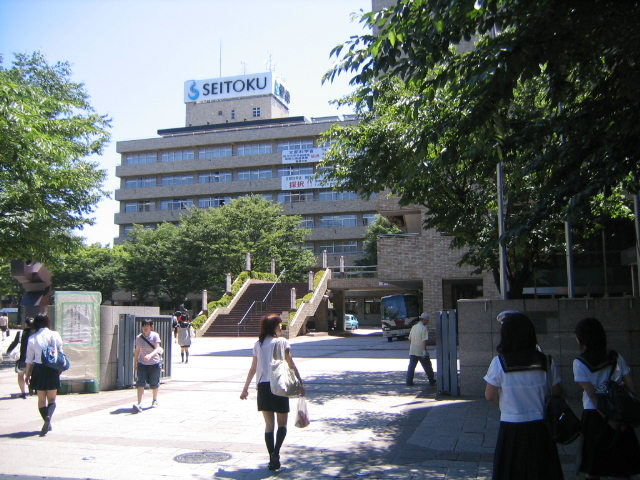
- Type: Private
- Established: 1965
- Location: Matsudo, Chiba, Japan
- Website: www.seitoku.jp/univ/tandai/index.shtml

Seitoku University Junior College (聖徳大学短期大学部, Seitoku Daigaku Tanki Daigakubu) is a private junior college in Matsudo, Chiba, Japan. It was established in 1933 as a specialized school, and became a junior college in 1965. In 1972, a distance education course was set up. It has been attached to Seitoku University since 1990.

The college was named in honour of Shōtoku, a medieval regent. His name's first syllable, shō has an alternative reading sei (the Kan’on reading), which was used for naming this school.

== Departments ==
- Department of childcare studies

== See also ==
- List of junior colleges in Japan
