= Nagareyama Line =

Railway line in Chiba Prefecture, Japan

Nagareyama Line 流山線
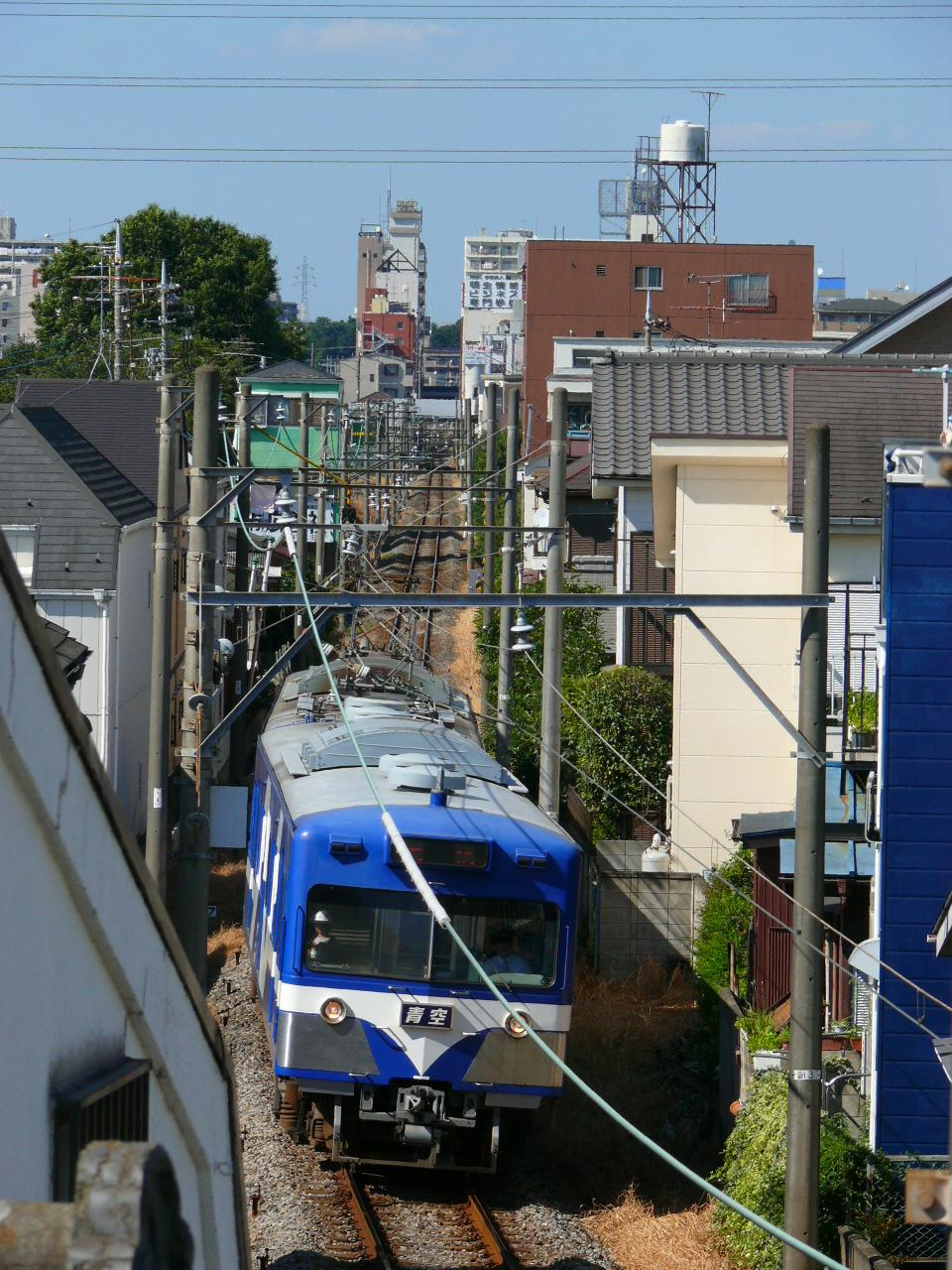
- Ryūtetsu Nagareyama 2000 series EMU Aozora near Mabashi

Overview
- Owner: Ryūtetsu
- Locale: Chiba Prefecture
- Termini: Mabashi; Nagareyama
- Stations: 6

Service
- Type: Heavy rail
- Depot: Nagareyama

History
- Opened: 1916; 110 years ago

Technical
- Line length: 5.7 km (3.5 mi)
- Track gauge: 1,067 mm (3 ft 6 in)
- Electrification: Overhead line, 1,500 V DC

The Nagareyama Line (Japanese: 流山線, Hepburn: Nagareyama-sen) is a commuter rail line in Chiba Prefecture, Japan, operated by Ryutetsu (流鉄株式会社, Ryūtetsu kabushiki-kaisha) between Mabashi Station in Matsudo and Nagareyama Station in Nagareyama. The line and the operator company was called the Sōbu Nagareyama Line (総武流山線, Sōbu Nagareyama-sen) and Sōbu Nagareyama Electric Railway (総武流山電鉄, Sōbu Nagareyama Dentetsu) respectively until the renaming on August 1, 2008. The present line name was the most popular short name of the line. It was also called Ryūden (流電).

This is the only line Ryūtetsu operates, making the company unique for being an independent railway operator with just a single 5.7 km line and no major subsidiary businesses (unlike Yamaman, or The Oriental Land Company and their Disney Resort Line). The short line functions as a link between the centre of the city of Nagareyama and the East Japan Railway Company (JR East) Jōban Line. However, after the opening of the Tsukuba Express on August 24, 2005, ridership fell sharply. Suica and PASMO contactless smart cards cannot be used, and Ryūtetsu reportedly has no plans to introduce the system on the line.

== Basic data ==
- Double-tracking: None
- Railway signalling: Automatic Train Stop
- Passing loop: Kogane-Jōshi Station

== Rolling stock ==
Outside and inside a Ryūtetsu Nagareyama line train, 2012

=== Current ===
- 5000 series (former Seibu New 101 series) 2-car EMU x five trainsets

=== Future ===
On July 9, 2025, Ryutetsu announced that they had purchased four 211-6000 series 2-car trainsets from JR Central. The trains will be refurbished before entering service to replace the current 5000 series trains.

== Stations ==
All stations are in Chiba Prefecture.

No.	Name	Distance in km (mi)		Transfers	Location
No.	Name	Between stations	Total	Transfers	Location
RN1	Mabashi 馬橋	—N/a	0.0 (0)	Jōban Line (Local) (JL24)	Matsudo
RN2	Kōya 幸谷	1.7 (1.1)	1.7 (1.1)	Jōban Line (Local) (Shin-Matsudo: JL24); Musashino Line (Shin-Matsudo: JM15)	Matsudo
RN3	Kogane-Jōshi 小金城趾	1.1 (0.68)	2.8 (1.7)		Matsudo
RN4	Hiregasaki 鰭ヶ崎	0.8 (0.50)	3.6 (2.2)		Nagareyama
RN5	Heiwadai 平和台	1.5 (0.93)	5.1 (3.2)		Nagareyama
RN6	Nagareyama 流山	0.6 (0.37)	5.7 (3.5)		Nagareyama

== History ==
The company was incorporated on November 7, 1913 as Nagareyama Light Railway (流山軽便鉄道, Nagareyama Keiben Tetsudō) and opened a 762 mm (2 ft 6 in) gauge railway on March 14, 1916. The company renamed Nagareyama Railway (流山鉄道, Nagareyama Tetsudō) in November 1922 and rebuilt the railway track to 1,067 mm (3 ft 6 in) gauge in 1924.

The company name was again changed to Nagareyama Electric Railway (Nagareyama Denki Tetsudō) in 1949, to Nagareyama Electric Railway (Nagareyama Dentetsu) in 1967, to Sōbu Nagareyama Electric Railway in 1971 and to Ryūtetsu in 2008.
