= Manman-ji =

Buddhist temple in Chiba Prefecture, Japan

Manman-ji 万満寺
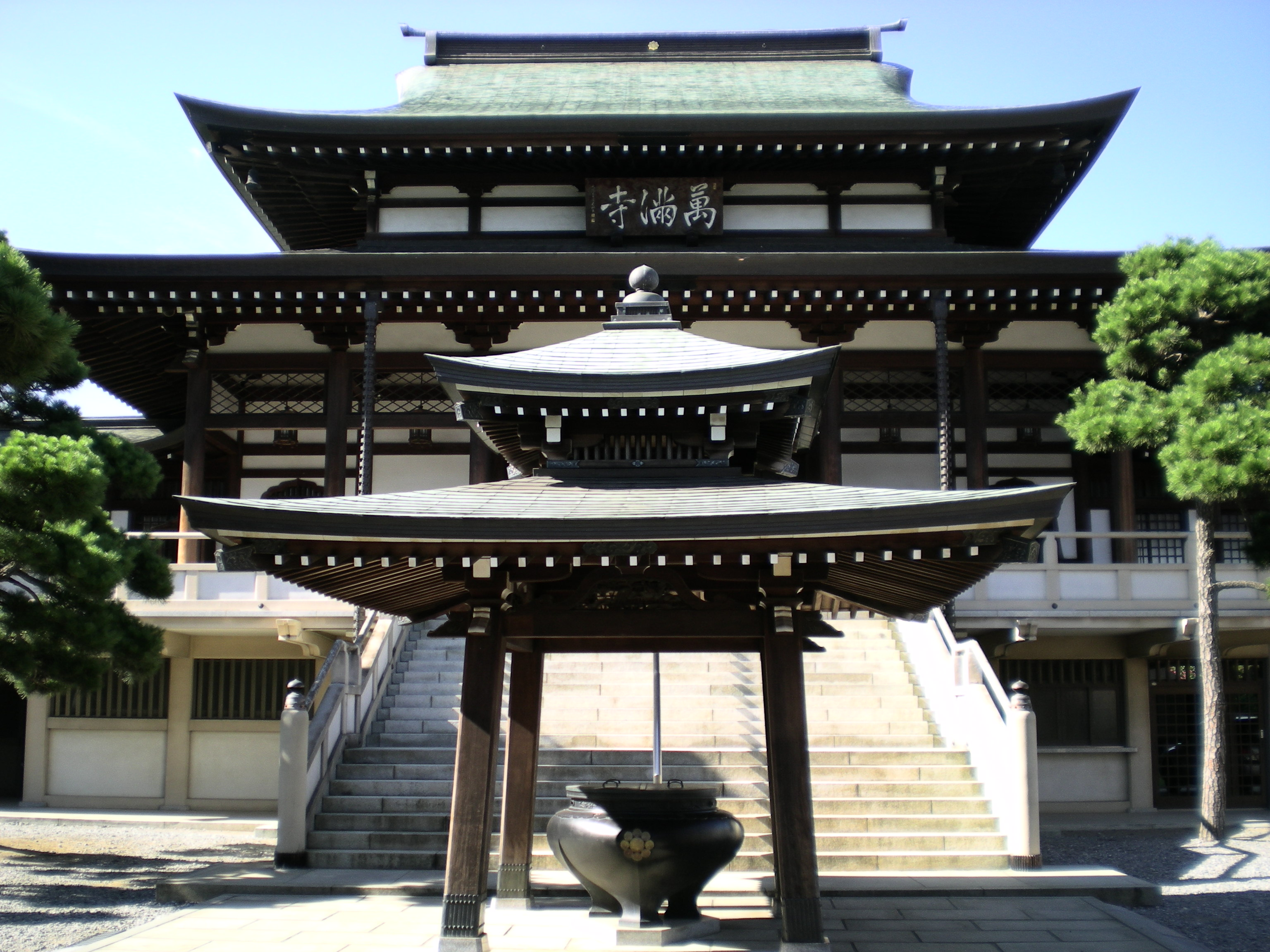
- Hondō

Religion
- Affiliation: Buddhist
- Deity: Amida Nyōrai
- Rite: Rinzai Zen Daitoku-ji Sect

Location
- Location: 2547 Mabashi, Matsudo, Chiba Prefecture
- Country: Japan
- Interactive map of Manman-ji 万満寺
- Coordinates: 35°48′N 139°55′E

Architecture
- Founder: Chiba Yoritane, Ninshō
- Completed: 1256

Manman-ji (万満寺) is a Buddhist temple belonging to the Rinzai school of Japanese Zen, located in the city of Matsudo in Chiba Prefecture, Japan. Its main image is a statue of Amida Nyōrai.

== History ==
The temple was built by Chiba Yoritane in 1256, originally as a Shingon Buddhist temple named Dainichi-ji, with the assistance of the famed prelate Ninshō, and was located in what is now Inage-ku, Chiba.

In the Muromachi period, it was converted to the Rinzai school by Chiba Mitsutane (1360–1426) and was renamed Manman-ji, taking one kanji from the name of the Kamakura kubō, Ashikaga Ujimitsu.

Between 1532 and 1555 Takagi Tanetatsu, a regional leader, invited the priest Kinho from Daitoku-ji in Kyoto to the region. Over the next several years the area gained many adherents to the Rinzai school, and Manman-ji was related to its present location in 1537. Most of the temple was destroyed by a fire in 1908, and the Hondō was only reconstructed in 1987.

Manman-ji preserved a pair of Kamakura period statues of the Nio guardians, which are designated an Important Cultural Property (Japan)

== Gallery ==
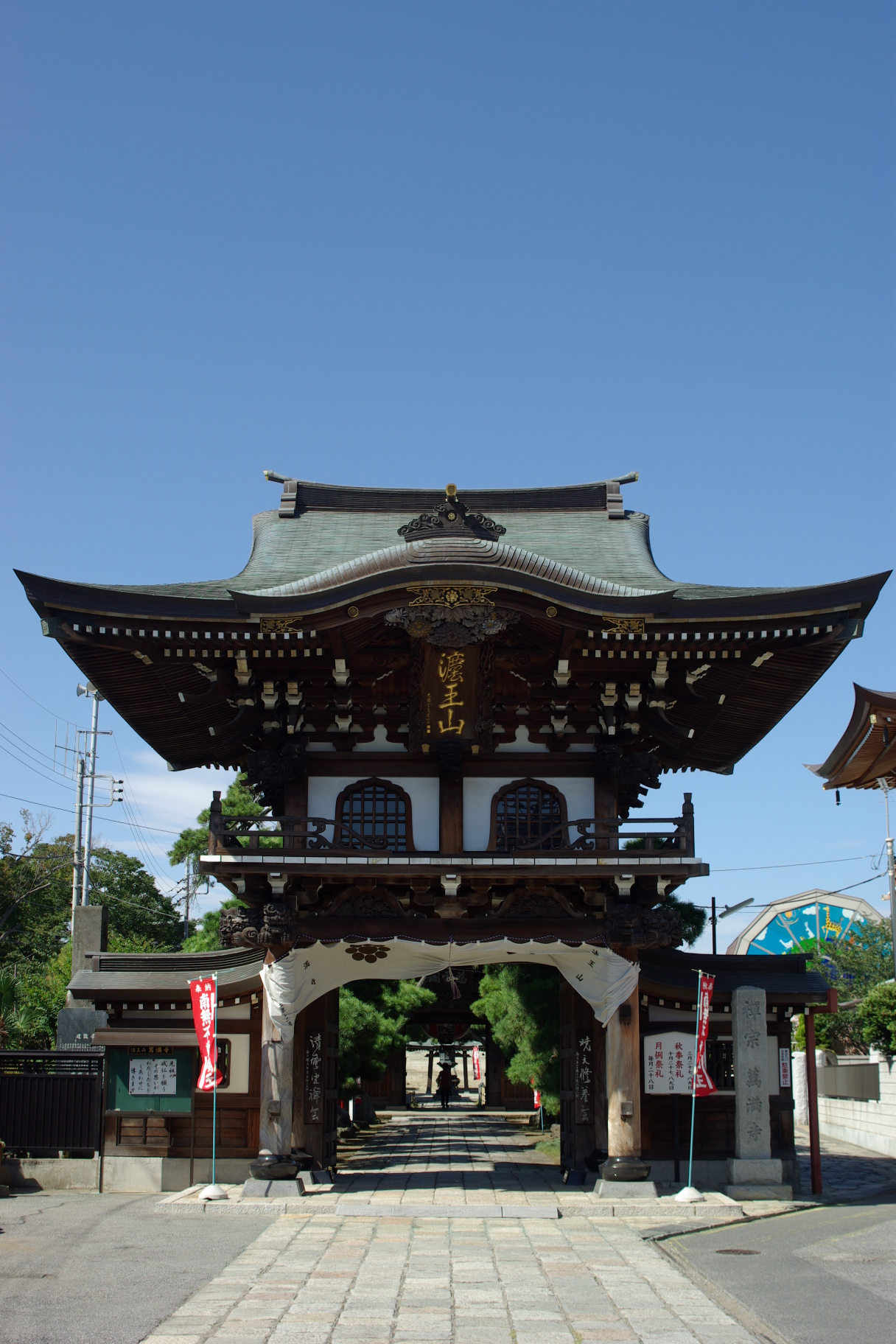
Sanmon

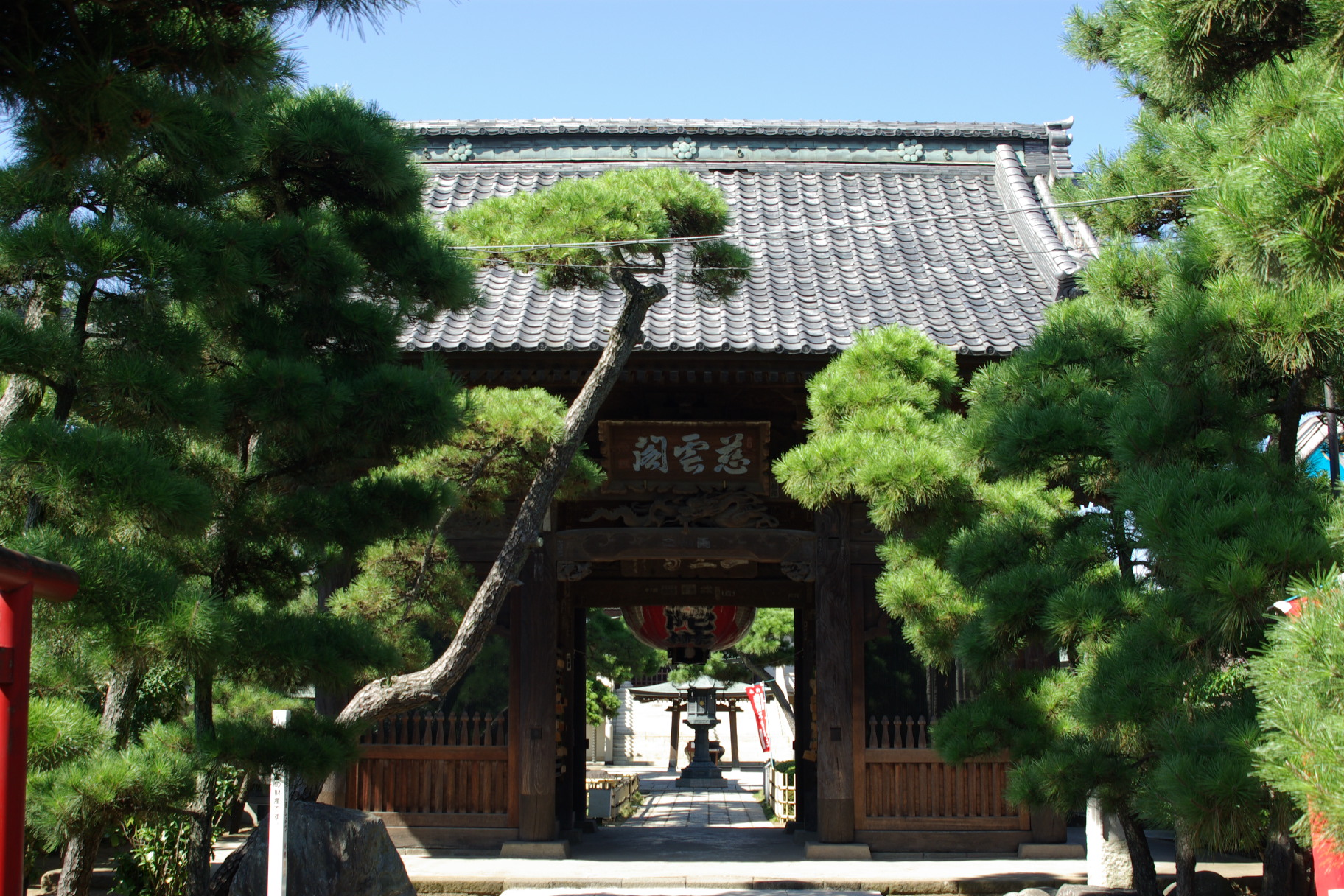
Niōmon

=== Sources ===
- Chibaken No Rekishi Sanpo (千葉県の歴史散歩: "Walking Chiba Prefecture's History"), Yamakawa Shuppansha, 1994.
