= Edo River =

River in the Kanto Plain, Japan

Coordinates: 35°40′14″N 139°57′02″E

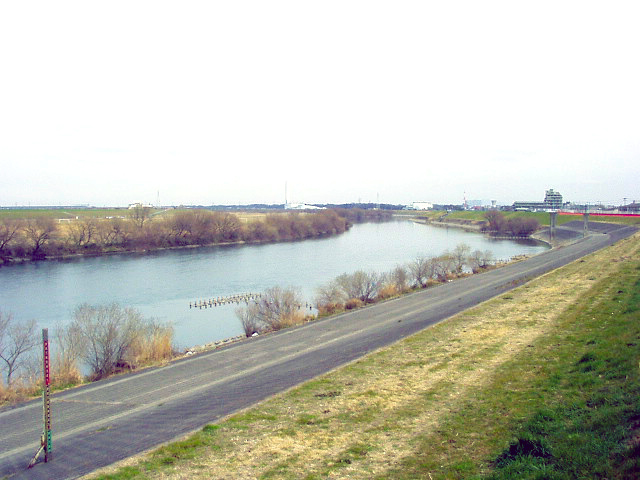
- Edo River in Nagareyama, Chiba Prefecture, Japan

- Location within Japan
- Native name: 江戸川 (Japanese)

Location
- Country: Japan
- Prefectures: Ibaraki, Chiba, Saitama, Tokyo

Physical characteristics
- Source
  - location: Tone River
  - elevation: 8.6 m (28 ft)
- Mouth
  - location: Tokyo Bay at Ichikawa, Chiba Prefecture
- Length: 59.5 km (37.0 mi)
- Basin size: 200 km^{2} (77 sq mi)
- Discharge
  - average: 109.96 m^{3}/s (3,883 cu ft/s)

The Edo River (江戸川, Edo-gawa; Japanese pronunciation: [è̞.dó̞.ɡä́.β̞ä́, -ŋä́-]) is a river in the Kantō region of Japan. It splits from the Tone River at the northernmost tip of Noda City in the Sekiyado district, crosses through Nagareyama and Matsudo, and empties into Tokyo Bay at Ichikawa, Chiba Prefecture. The Edo forms the borders between Tokyo, Chiba, and Saitama prefectures. The Edo River is 59.5 kilometres (37.0 mi) long.

The course of the Edo River was originally the lower course of the Tone River. The Tone was diverted in 1654 by the Tokugawa shogunate to protect the city of Edo from flooding. The Edo was used to connect the north and east of the Kantō region to the capital at Edo, specifically to transport large amounts of cargo from Chōshi and other cities on the Pacific Ocean coast inland to the capital. Before the industrialization of the Tokyo region the river was also used to cultivate lotus roots.

Inland transportation ended in the early 20th century due to the development of an extensive rail cargo network in the Kantō region, but the Edo River remains an important source of water for industrial production as well as drainage for the densely populated areas of metropolitan Tokyo. Tokyo Disneyland is located on landfill adjacent to a diverted branch of the Edo River known as the Kyū Edo River (Old Edo River) which empties into Tokyo Bay between Urayasu, Chiba and the Minamikasai district of Edogawa, Tokyo.

The Edo river has distance markers at every 250 metres (820 ft) that mark the distance from the river mouth that meets with the Tokyo Bay.
