= Minami-Nagareyama Station =

Railway station in Nagareyama, Chiba Prefecture, Japan

Minami-Nagareyama Station 南流山駅
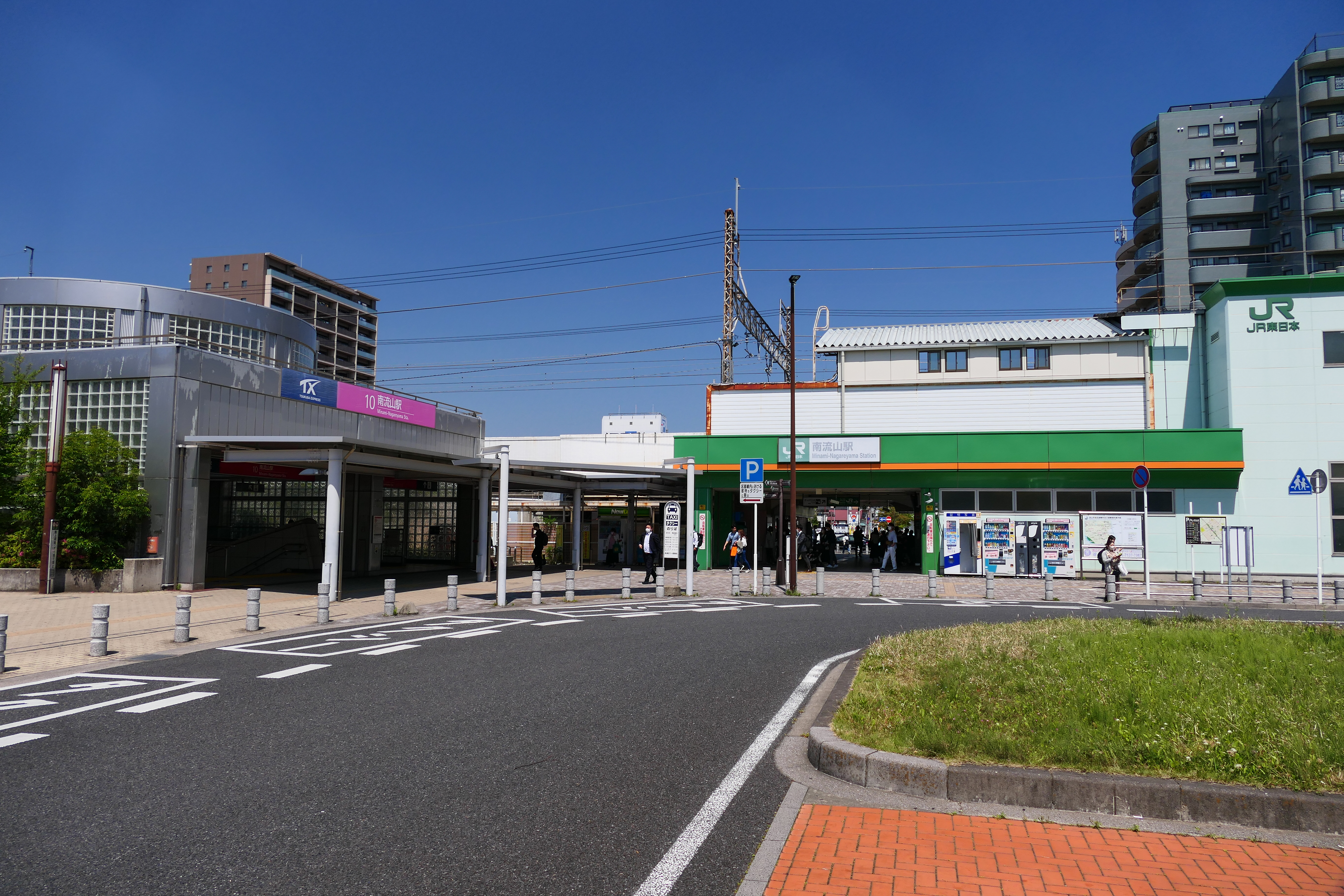
- South Exit, May 2023

General information
- Location: Minami-Nagareyama, Nagareyama-shi, Chiba-ken 270-0163; Japan
- Operator: JR East; Metropolitan Intercity Railway Company
- Line: Musashino Line: Tsukuba Express
- Connections: Bus stop
Location
- Location within Chiba Prefecture Location within Japan

Minami-Nagareyama Station (南流山駅, Minami-Nagareyama-eki) is an interchange passenger railway station in the city of Nagareyama, Chiba, Japan, operated by both East Japan Railway Company (JR East) and the third-sector railway operating company Metropolitan Intercity Railway Company. The station is number 10 on the Tsukuba Express line.

== Lines ==
Minami-Nagareyama Station is served by the orbital Musashino Line, which runs between Fuchūhommachi and Tokyo, and by the Tsukuba Express line, which runs from Akihabara in Tokyo and Tsukuba in Ibaraki Prefecture. It is located 55.4 kilometers (34.4 mi) from Fuchūhommachi Station on the Musashino Line, and 22.1 kilometers (13.7 mi) from Akihabara Station on the Tsukuba Express.

== Station layout ==
=== JR East ===
JM16 Minami-Nagareyama Station 南流山駅
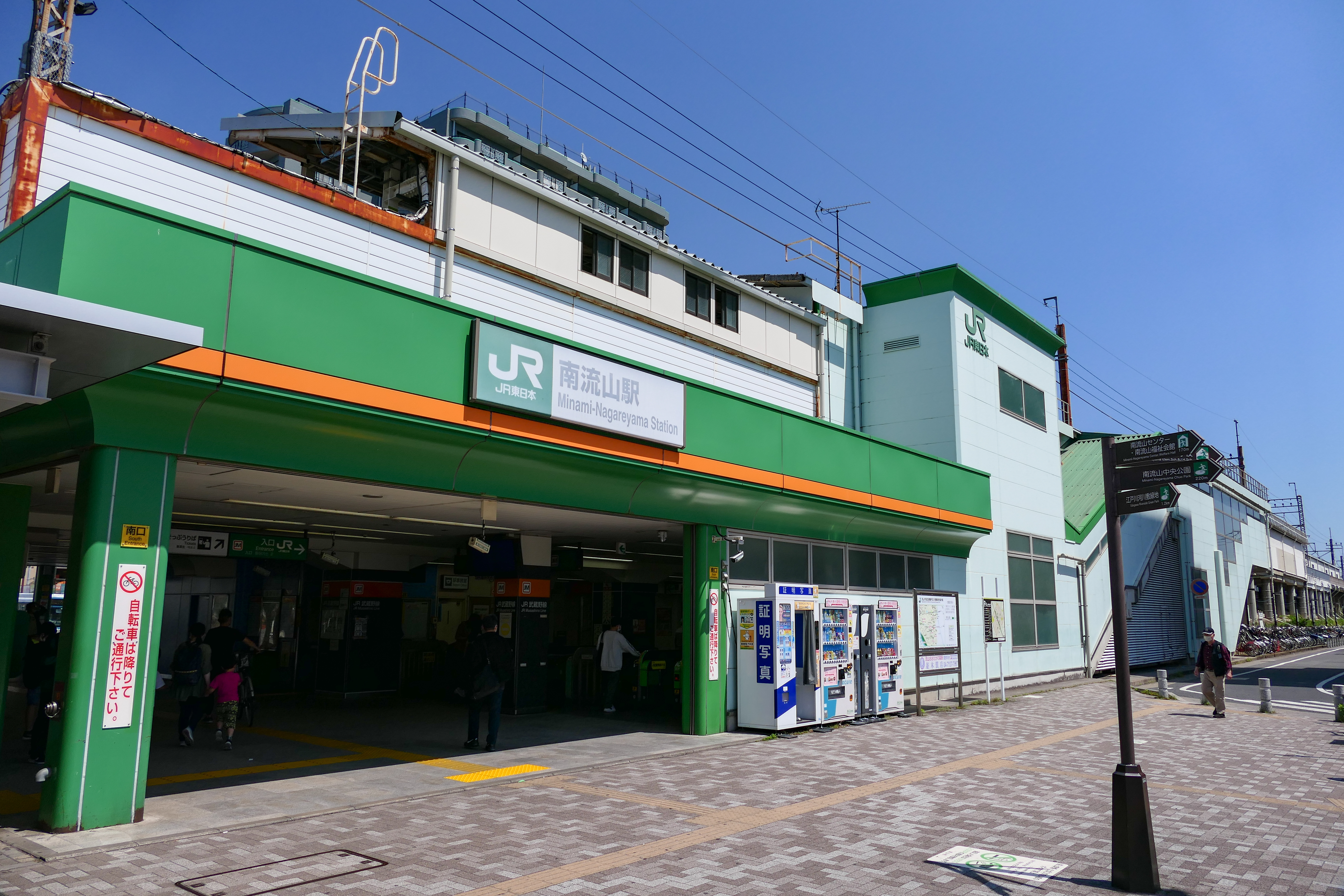
- JR East station building (south exit), May 2023

General information
- Location: 1–25 Minami-Nagareyama, Nagareyama-shi, Chiba-ken 270-0163; Japan
- Coordinates: 35°50′17.84″N 139°54′12.66″E
- Operator: JR East
- Line: Musashino Line
- Platforms: 2 (2 side platforms)

Other information
- Status: Staffed

History
- Opened: 1 April 1973

Passengers
- FY2020: 27,395 daily

Services
Preceding station	JR East	Following station
Misato JM17 towards Ōmiya	Shimōsa	Shim-Matsudo JM15 towards Kaihimmakuhari
Misato JM17 towards Fuchūhommachi	Musashino Line	Shim-Matsudo JM15 towards Kaihimmakuhari or Tokyo
Location

The JR East station consists of two elevated opposed side platforms serving two tracks, with a bi-directional centre track used for freight services. The station building is located underneath the platforms.

==== Platforms ====
1	Musashino Line	for Minami-Koshigaya, Musashi-Urawa, and Fuchūhommachi
2	Musashino Line	for Nishi-Funabashi, Tokyo, and Kaihimmakuhari

=== Tsukuba Express ===
Minami-Nagareyama Station 南流山駅
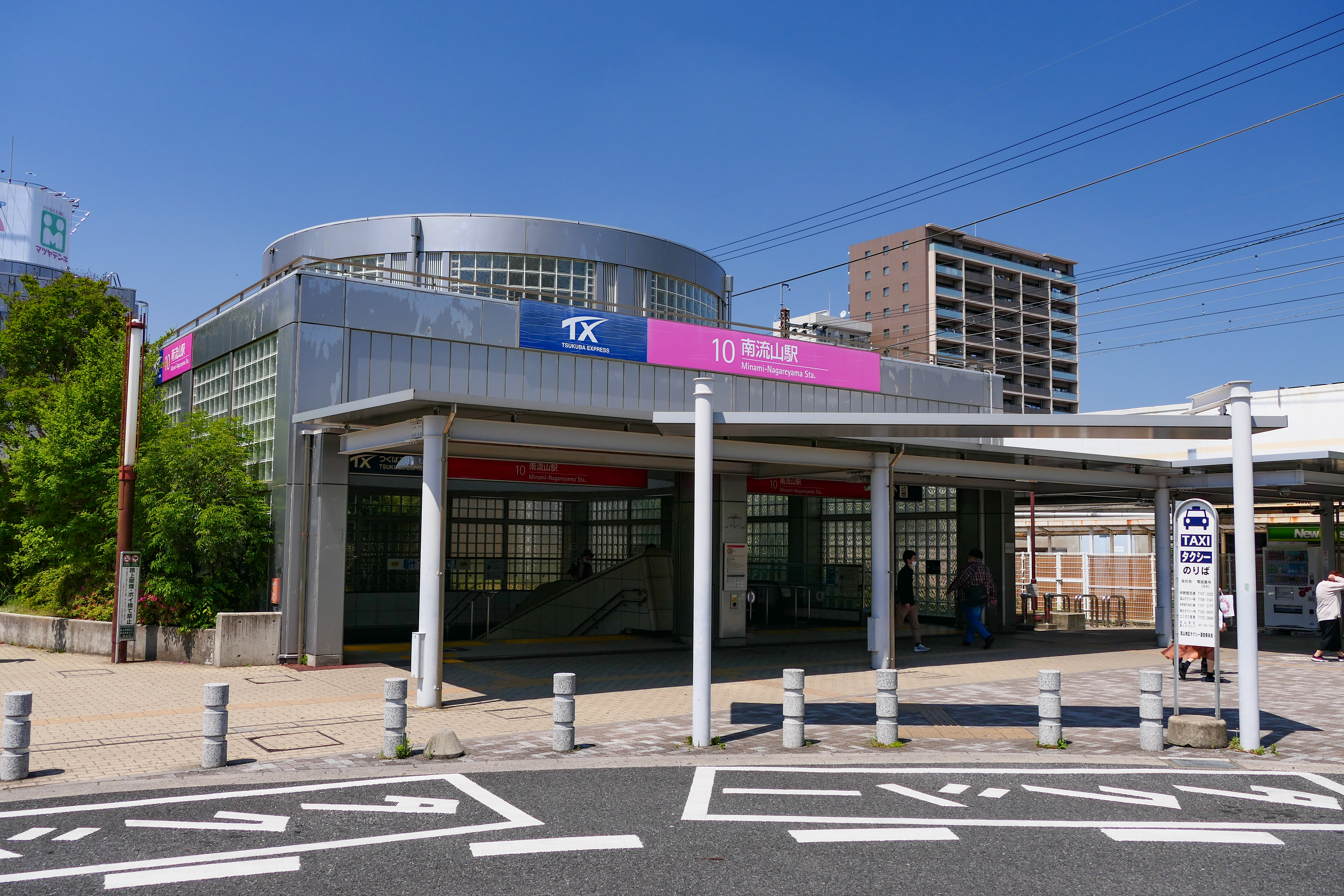
- Tsukuba Express Line Station building (A1 exit), May 2023

General information
- Location: 2–1 Minami-Nagareyama, Nagareyama-shi, Chiba-ken 270-0163; Japan
- System: Tsukuba Express station (underground)
- Operator: Metropolitan Intercity Railway Company
- Line: Tsukuba Express
- Platforms: 2 (1 island platform)

Construction
- Structure type: Underground

Other information
- Status: Staffed
- Station code: TX10

History
- Opened: 24 August 2005

Passengers
- FY2020: 27,754 daily

Services
Preceding station	Tsukuba Express	Following station
Yashio (TX08) towards Akihabara	Tsukuba Express Rapid	Nagareyama-Ōtakanomori (TX12) towards Tsukuba
Yashio (TX08) towards Akihabara	Tsukuba Express Commuter-Rapid	Nagareyama-Ōtakanomori (TX12) towards Tsukuba
Misato-chūō (TX09) towards Akihabara	Tsukuba Express Semi-Rapid	Nagareyama-Ōtakanomori (TX12) towards Tsukuba
Misato-chūō (TX09) towards Akihabara	Tsukuba Express Local	Nagareyama-centralpark (TX11) towards Tsukuba
Location

The Tsukuba Express station consists of an underground island platform serving two tracks. The platforms were approximately 125 m (410 ft) long when built, to accommodate 6-car trains.

==== Platforms ====
1	■ Tsukuba Express	for Nagareyama-Ōtakanomori, Moriya, and Tsukuba
2	■ Tsukuba Express	for Misato-chūō, Kita-Senju, and Akihabara

Track diagram showing connections between Musashino Line and Joban Line east of Minami-Nagareyama Station

== History ==
Minami-Nagareyama Station opened on 1 April 1973.

The Tsukuba Express station opened on 24 August 2005, coinciding with the opening of the line.

The Tsukuba Express platforms were lengthened by 40 m (131 ft) in either direction on 23 September 2012 to allow the train stopping positions to be offset, thus reducing platform crowding during peak periods.

== Passenger statistics ==
In fiscal 2019, the JR East portion of the station was used by an average of 35,517 passengers daily (boarding passengers only). The Tsukuba Express portion of the station was used by 37,560 passengers during the same period.

== Surrounding area ==
- Toyo Gakuen University Nagareyama Campus
- Nagareyama Post Office

== See also ==
- List of railway stations in Japan
