= Heiwadai Station (Chiba) =

Railway station in Nagareyama, Chiba Prefecture, Japan

Heiwadai Station 平和台駅
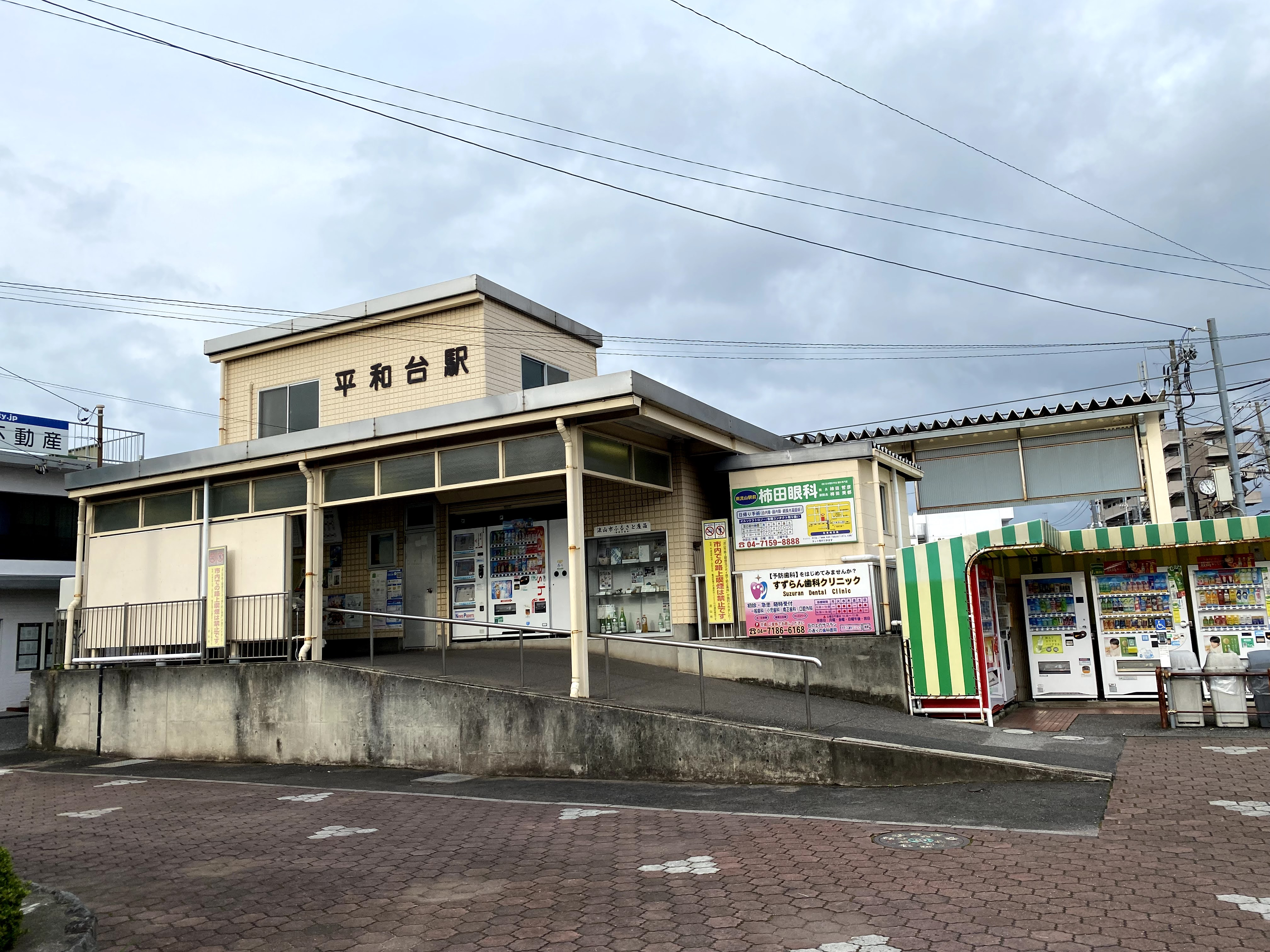
- Heiwadai Station, July 2021

General information
- Location: 4-483 Hiregasaki, Nagareyama-shi, Chiba-ken 270-0161; Japan
- Coordinates: 35.8508°N 139.9011°E
- Operator: Ryūtetsu
- Line: ■ Nagareyama Line
- Distance: 5.1 km from Mabashi
- Platforms: 1 side platform

Other information
- Status: Staffed
- Station code: RN5
- Website: Official website

History
- Opened: April 1, 1933
- Former names: Akagi Station (to 1965), Akagidai Station (to 1974)

Passengers
- FY2019: 2638 daily

Services
Preceding station	Ryutetsu	Following station
Hiregasaki towards Mabashi	Nagareyama Line	Nagareyama Terminus
Location
- Location within Chiba Prefecture Location within Japan

Heiwadai Station (平和台駅, Heiwadai-eki) is a passenger railway station located in the city of Nagareyama, Chiba Prefecture, Japan operated by the private railway operator Ryūtetsu. It is numbered station RN5.

== Lines ==
Heiwadai Station is served by the Nagareyama Line, and is located 5.1 km from the official starting point of the line at Mabashi Station.

== Station layout ==
The station consists of one side platform serving a single bi-directional track.

== History ==
Heiwadai Station was opened on April 1, 1933 as Akagi Station (赤城駅). It was renamed to Akagidai Station (赤城台駅) on June 26, 1965, and renamed again to its present name on October 1, 1974.

== Passenger statistics ==
In fiscal 2018, the station was used by an average of 2629 passengers daily.

== Surrounding area ==
- Chiba Prefectural Nagareyama Minami High School
- Nagareyama Elementary School

== See also ==
- List of railway stations in Japan
