= Nagareyama =

Nagareyama 流山市
- City
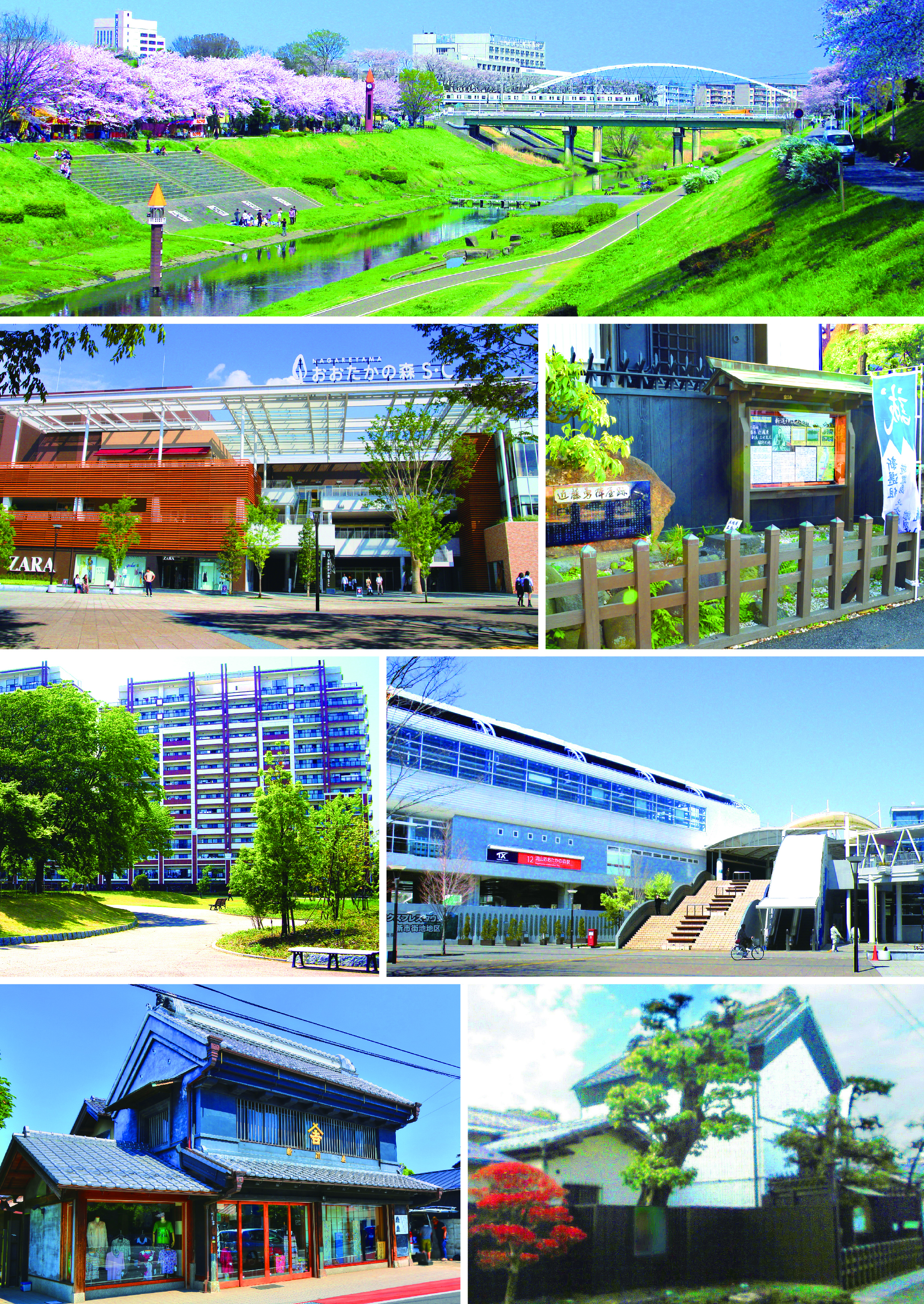
Tone Canal
Nagareyama-ōtakanomori SC	Kondō Isami jin'ya
Nagareyama-ōtakanomori park exit	Nagareyama-ōtakanomori Station
Kuremono Shinkawaya store	Akimoto family kura
- Flag Seal

- Location of Nagareyama in Chiba Prefecture

- Coordinates: 35°51′22.7″N 139°54′10.3″E
- Country: Japan
- Region: Kantō
- Prefecture: Chiba

Government
  - Mayor: Yoshiharu Izaki (Ind; since May 2003)

Area
  - Total: 35.28 km^{2} (13.62 sq mi)

Population (February 1, 2024)
  - Total: 211,620
  - Density: 5,998/km^{2} (15,540/sq mi)
- Time zone: UTC+9 (Japan Standard Time)
- -Tree: Japanese Box
- Flower: Rhododendron
- Phone number: 04-7158-1111
- Address: 1-1-1, Heiwadai, Nagareyama-shi, Chiba-ken 270-0192
- Website: Official website

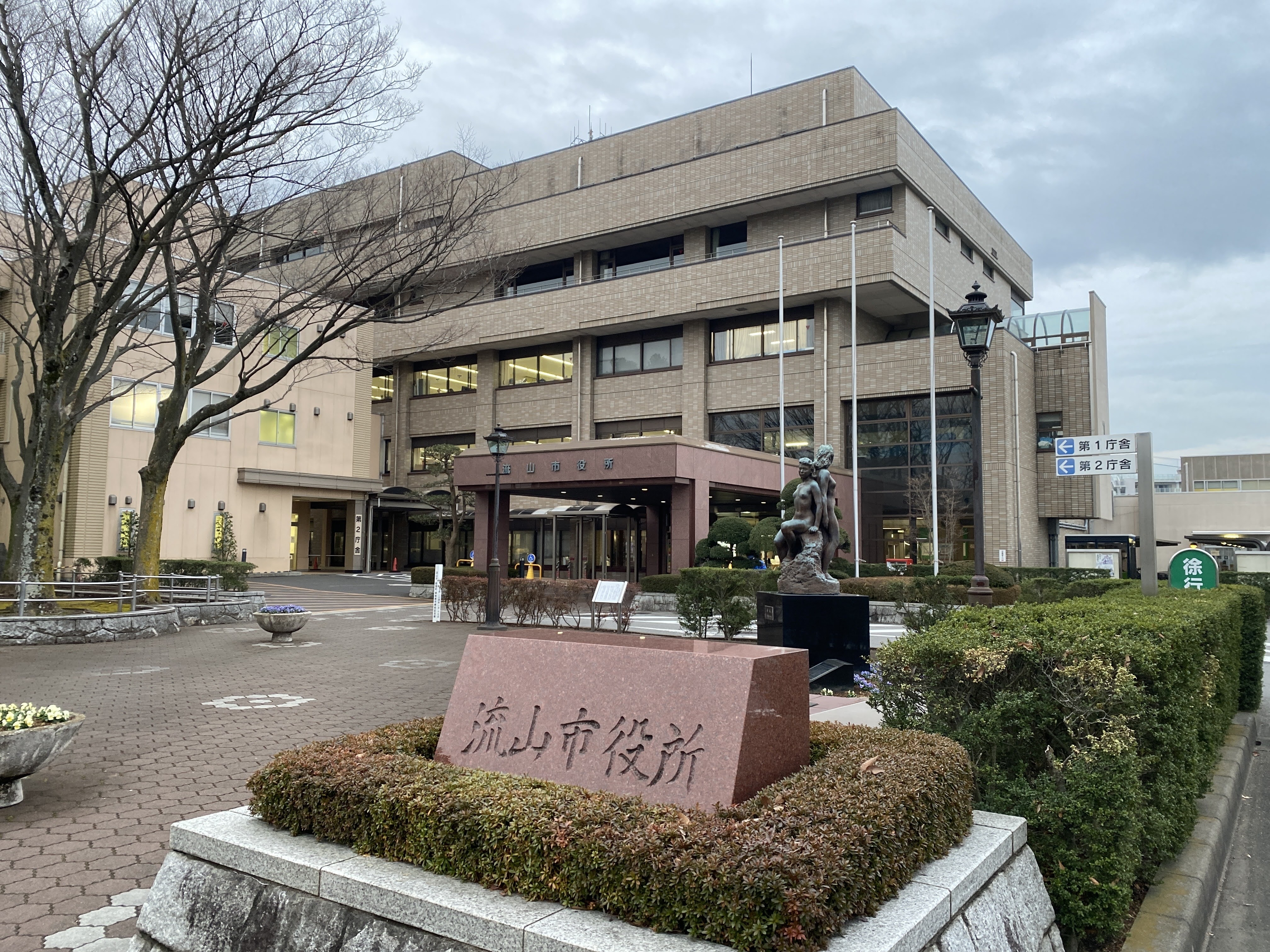
Nagareyama City Hall

Nagareyama (流山市, Nagareyama-shi) is a city located in Chiba Prefecture, Japan. As of 1 February 2024, the city had an estimated population of 211,620 in 89,751 households and a population density of 6,000 persons per km^{2}. The total area of the city is 35.28 km^{2} (13.62 sq mi).

== Geography ==
Nagareyama is located in the far northwestern corner of Chiba Prefecture, bordered by the Edogawa River to the west. It is about 30 kilometers from the prefectural capital at Chiba and within 20 to 30 kilometers from the center of Tokyo. The city area is long from north to south, and the central and northern parts of the city form part of the Shimōsa Plateau, with almost the entire area as either residential or farmland. The Edo River runs north and south along the western border of the city, opposite which is Saitama Prefecture. In addition, the Tone Canal runs through the northern part of the city.

=== Neighboring municipalities ===
Chiba Prefecture

- Kashiwa
- Matsudo
- Noda

Saitama Prefecture

- Misato
- Yoshikawa

=== Climate ===
Nagareyama has a humid subtropical climate (Köppen Cfa) characterized by warm summers and cool winters with light to no snowfall. The average annual temperature in Nagareyama is 14.8 °C. The average annual rainfall is 1370 mm with September as the wettest month. The temperatures are highest on average in August, at around 26.6 °C, and lowest in January, at around 4.0 °C.

== Demographics ==
Per Japanese census data, the population of Nagareyama has seen strong growth from the 1950s to the present day. As Japan's overall population reached its peak in the early 21st century, Nagareyama's continued growth has been attributed to city policies from 2003 to heavily invest in childcare centers, including a transit service at Nagareyama-centralpark Station where parents can drop off their children on their way to work, with the children then shuttled with buses to daycare centers. Senior people of the local community help caring for the children. Many parents say this transit service was one of the biggest reasons for them to move to Nagareyama. There are also many local events and community spaces where children and elderly interact. There is also a summer camp which children can attend while their parents work during holidays. These family friendly approaches lured young working parents from Tokyo to Nagareyama.

Historical population
Year	Pop.	±%
1920	11,115	—
1930	11,947	+7.5%
1940	13,178	+10.3%
1950	18,337	+39.1%
1960	25,672	+40.0%
1970	56,485	+120.0%
1980	106,635	+88.8%
1990	140,059	+31.3%
2000	150,527	+7.5%
2010	163,984	+8.9%
2020	199,849	+21.9%

== History ==
During the Edo period, Nagareyama was a river port on the Edogawa River and was noted for its production of mirin, a sweetened sake used for cooking. After the Meiji Restoration, Nagareyama Town was created in Inba District, Chiba Prefecture on April 1, 1889 with the establishment of the modern municipalities system. On January 1, 1952, it merged with neighboring Edogawa Town. Nagareyama was raised to city status on January 1, 1967.

== Government ==
Nagareyama has a mayor-council form of government with a directly elected mayor and a unicameral city council of 28 members. Nagareyama contributes two members to the Chiba Prefectural Assembly. In terms of national politics, the city is part of Chiba 7th district of the lower house of the Diet of Japan. The city held up "If you were to be a mother, you would got to Nagareyama." The number of the children is growing rapidly. "Child - rearng town " is the pride of Nagareyama City.

== Economy ==
Nagareyama is a regional commercial center and a commuter town for nearby Chiba and Tokyo. The commuting rate is 33.5% to central of Tokyo and 12.5% to Kashiwa.

== Education ==
=== Universities ===
- Edogawa Junior College
- Edogawa University
- Toyo Gakuen University

=== Primary and secondary education ===
Nagareyama has 17 public elementary schools and nine public middle schools operated by the city government, and four public high schools operated by the Chiba Prefectural Board of Education. There is also one private elementary school. The prefecture also operates one special education school for the handicapped.

== Transportation ==
=== Railway ===
Ryūtetsu - Nagareyama Line

- Hiregasaki – Heiwadai – Nagareyama

Tōbu Railway - Tōbu Urban Park Line

- Edogawadai - Hatsuishi - Nagareyama-ōtakanomori

JR East – Musashino Line

- Minami-Nagareyama

Metropolitan Intercity Railway Company - Tsukuba Express

- Minami-Nagareyama - Nagareyama-centralpark - Nagareyama-ōtakanomori

=== Highway ===
- Jōban Expressway
- National Route 6

== Sister cities ==
Nagareyama is twinned with:

- Sōma, Fukushima, Japan, since 1977
- Shinano, Nagano, Japan, since 1997
- Noto, Ishikawa, Japan, since 2012
- Kitakami, Iwate, Japan, since 2020

== Notable people from Nagareyama ==
- Hidekazu Otani, professional soccer player
- Yukiko Sumiyoshi, manga artist

== In fiction ==
- The fictional Nagarekawa of Locodol is based on Nagareyama. After the anime's release, the characters have become the city's official tourism concierge.
