= Kita-Kogane Station =

Railway station in Matsudo, Chiba Prefecture, Japan

JL26 Kita-Kogane Station 北小金駅
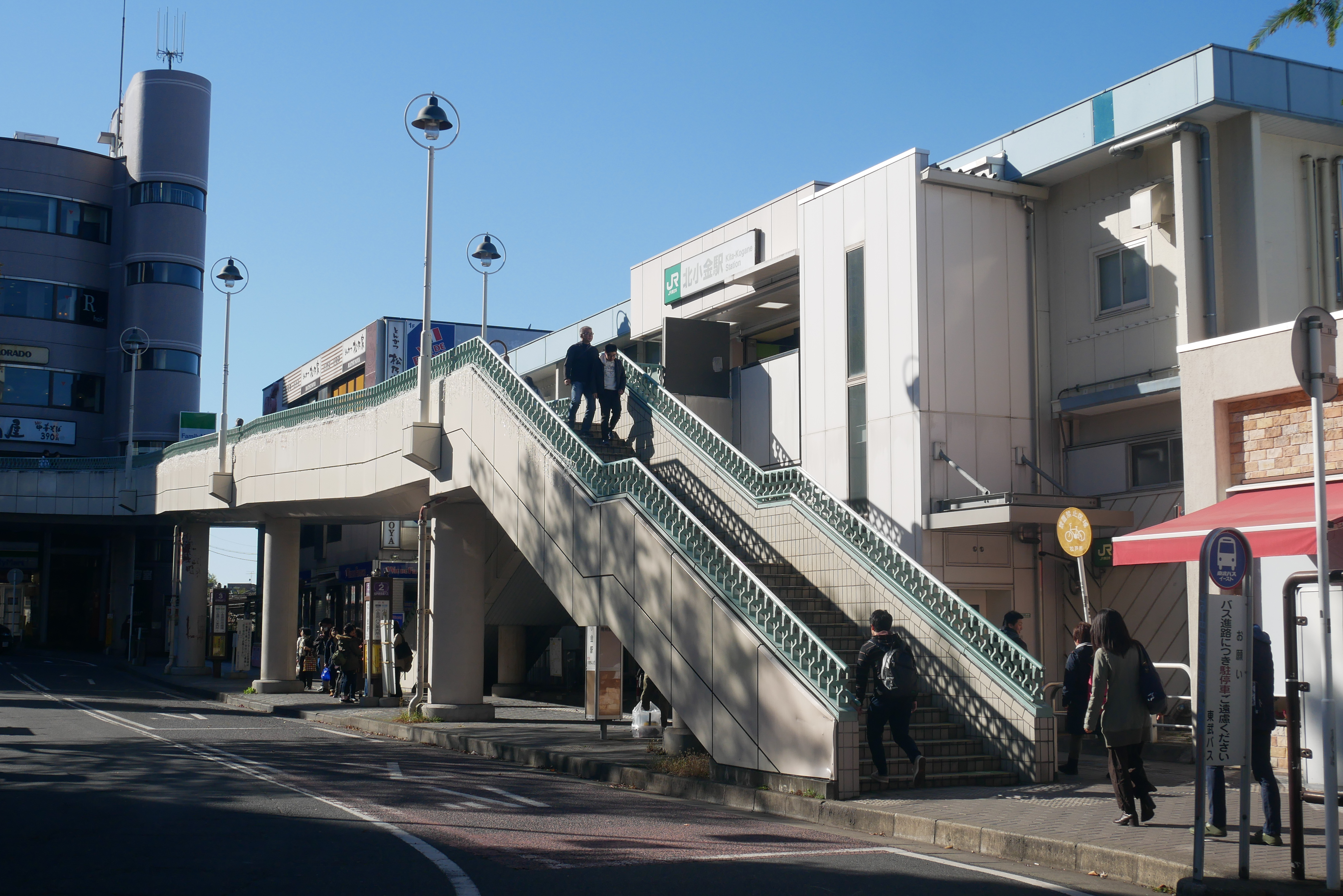
- Kita-Kogane Station, south exit in 2018

General information
- Location: 8-3 Kogane, Matsudo-shi, Chiba-ken 270-0014; Japan
- Coordinates: 35.8335°N 139.9315°E
- Operator: JR East
- Line: Jōban Line (Local)
- Distance: 22.0 km from Nippori
- Platforms: 1 island platform
- Connections: Bus terminal

Other information
- Status: Staffed
- Website: www.jreast.co.jp/estation/station/info.aspx?StationCd=566

History
- Opened: May 1, 1911

Passengers
- FY2019: 24,335 daily

Services
Preceding station	JR East	Following station
Shin-Matsudo JL25 towards Ayase	Jōban Line (Local) Local-Kankō	Minami-Kashiwa JL27 towards Toride
Location
- Location within Chiba Prefecture Location within Japan

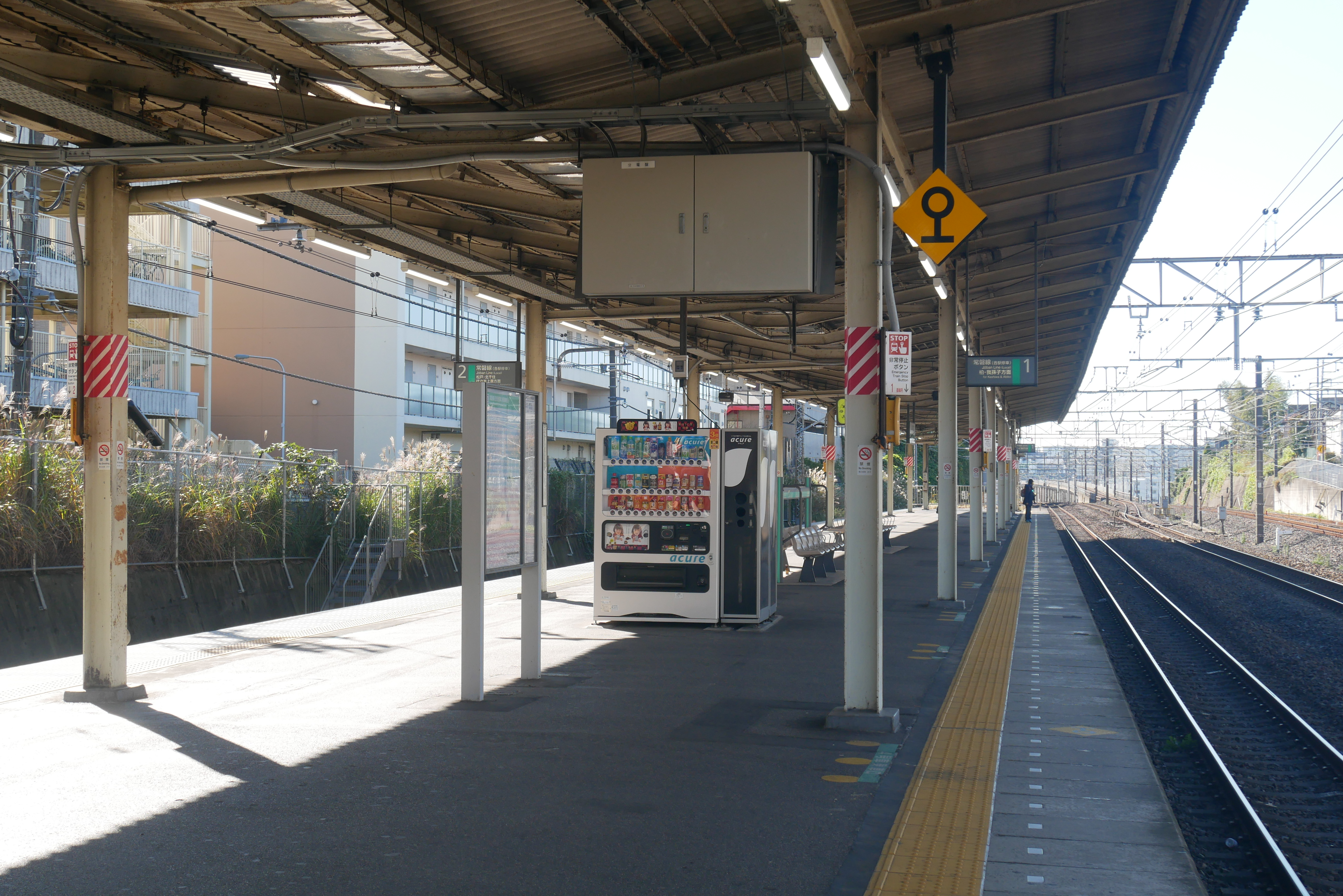
Station platforms, 2018

Kita-Kogane Station (北小金駅, Kitakogane-eki) is a passenger railway station in the city of Matsudo, Chiba Prefecture Japan, operated by East Japan Railway Company (JR East).

== Lines ==
Kita-Kogane is served by the Jōban Line and is 22.0 km from the terminus of the line at Nippori Station in Tokyo.

== Station layout ==
The station is an elevated station with a single island platform serving two tracks, and the station building underneath. The station is staffed.

=== Platforms ===
1	Jōban Line (Local)	for Kashiwa, Abiko, and Toride
2	Jōban Line (Local)	for Matsudo, Ayase; Tokyo Metro Chiyoda Line for Kita-senju, Nishi-nippori and Yoyogi-uehara

== History ==
Kita-Kogane Station was opened on May 1, 1911, as a station on the Japanese Government Railways (JGR), which became the Japan National Railways (JNR) after World War II. Kita-Kogane Station was absorbed into the JR East network upon the privatization of the JNR on April 1, 1987.

== Passenger statistics ==
In fiscal 2019, the station was used by an average of 24,335 passengers daily.

== See also ==
- List of railway stations in Japan
