= Shim-Matsudo Station =

Railway station in Matsudo, Chiba Prefecture, Japan

JL25 JM15 Shim-Matsudo Station 新松戸駅
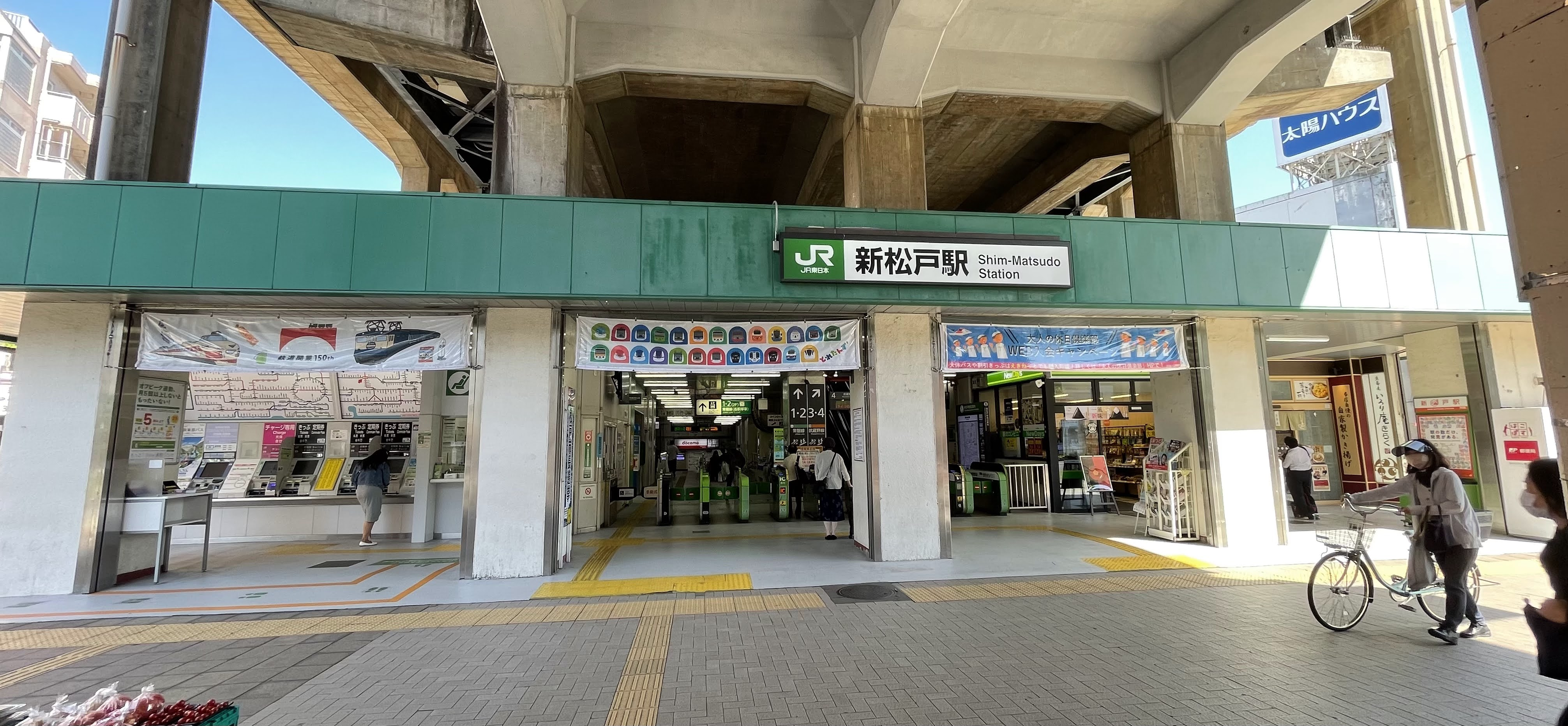
- Shim-Matsudo Station in June 2022

General information
- Location: 571-3 Koya, Matsudo City, Chiba Prefecture 270-0017; Japan
- Coordinates: 35°49′31.62″N 139°55′16.24″E
- Operator: JR East
- Lines: Jōban Line (Local) (Local); Musashino Line
- Platforms: 2 side + 1 island platform
- Connections: Nagareyama Line (Kōya)

Other information
- Status: Staffed ("Midori no Madoguchi" )
- Station code: JL25, JM15
- Website: Official website

History
- Opened: 1 April 1973; 53 years ago

Passengers
- FY2019: 39,140 daily

Services
Preceding station	JR East	Following station
Mabashi JL24 towards Ayase	Jōban Line (Local) Local-Kankō	Kita-Kogane JL26 towards Toride
Minami-Nagareyama JM16 towards Ōmiya	Shimōsa	Shin-Yahashira JM14 towards Kaihimmakuhari
Minami-Nagareyama JM16 towards Fuchūhommachi	Musashino Line	Shin-Yahashira JM14 towards Kaihimmakuhari or Tokyo
Location
- Location within Chiba Prefecture Location within Kanto Area Location within Japan

Shim-Matsudo Station (新松戸駅, Shin-Matsudo-eki) is a junction passenger railway station located in the city of Matsudo, Chiba, Japan, and operated by East Japan Railway Company (JR East). The spelling "Shim-Matsudo" is used by JR on the station signage as the official romanization of the station name.

== Lines ==
The station is served by the Jōban Line (Local) from Ayase Station in Tokyo, and by the orbital Musashino Line from Fuchūhommachi to Nishi-Funabashi and Tokyo. It is 57.5 kilometers from the western terminus of the Musashino Line at Fuchūhommachi.

== Station layout ==
The station consists of an island platform serving two tracks (1 and 2) for Jōban Line local services. The Musashino Line tracks are at a right angle above the Joban Line tracks, and served by two opposed side platforms (3 and 4).

The station has a "Midori no Madoguchi" staffed ticket office.

=== Platforms ===
Track diagram

1	Jōban Line (Local)	for Kashiwa, Abiko, and Toride
2	Jōban Line (Local)	for Matsudo, Ayase; Tokyo Metro Chiyoda Line for Kita-senju, Nishi-nippori and Yoyogi-uehara
3	Musashino Line	for Minami-Koshigaya, Minami-Urawa and Fuchūhommachi
4	Musashino Line	for Nishi-Funabashi, Tokyo, and Kaihimmakuhari

== History ==
Shim-Matsudo Station opened on 1 April 1973 as a station on Japanese National Railways (JNR). It was the terminal station for the Musashino Line until the line was extended to Nishi-Funabashi on 2 October 1978. The station was absorbed into the JR East network upon the privatization of JNR on 1 April 1987.

== Passenger statistics ==
In fiscal 2019, the station was used by an average of 39,140 passengers daily (boarding passengers only). The passenger figures for previous years are as shown below.

Fiscal year	Daily average
2000	37,974
2005	37,630
2010	35,834
2015	37,926

== See also ==
- List of railway stations in Japan
