= Seitoku University =

Coordinates: 35°47′0.1″N 139°54′17.6″E

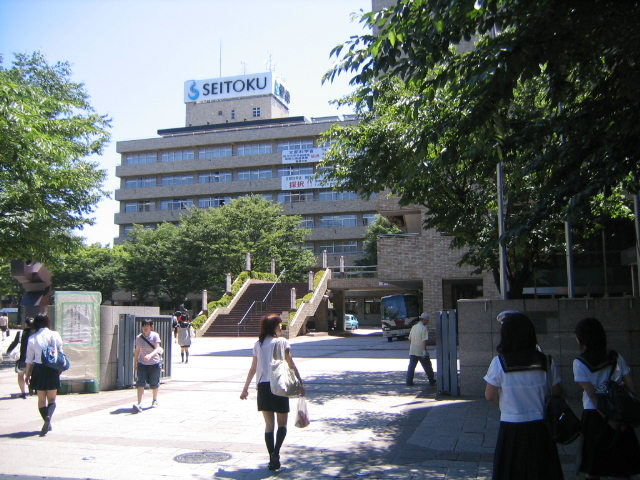
Seitoku University

Seitoku University (聖徳大学, Seitoku Daigaku) is a Japanese women's university in Matsudo, Chiba. It has faculties of Childhood Education, Literature and Social Sciences, Music, and Nutrition, as well as an affiliated Junior College. It was founded in 1990 and is accredited by the Japanese Ministry of Education.

It was named after the 7th-century regent Shōtoku. Shō (Go'on reading) can also be read sei (Kan’on reading); the latter was chosen for this school.
