= Toyo Gakuen University =

Private college in Chiba Prefecture, Japan

Coordinates: 35°42′16.8″N 139°45′27.5″E

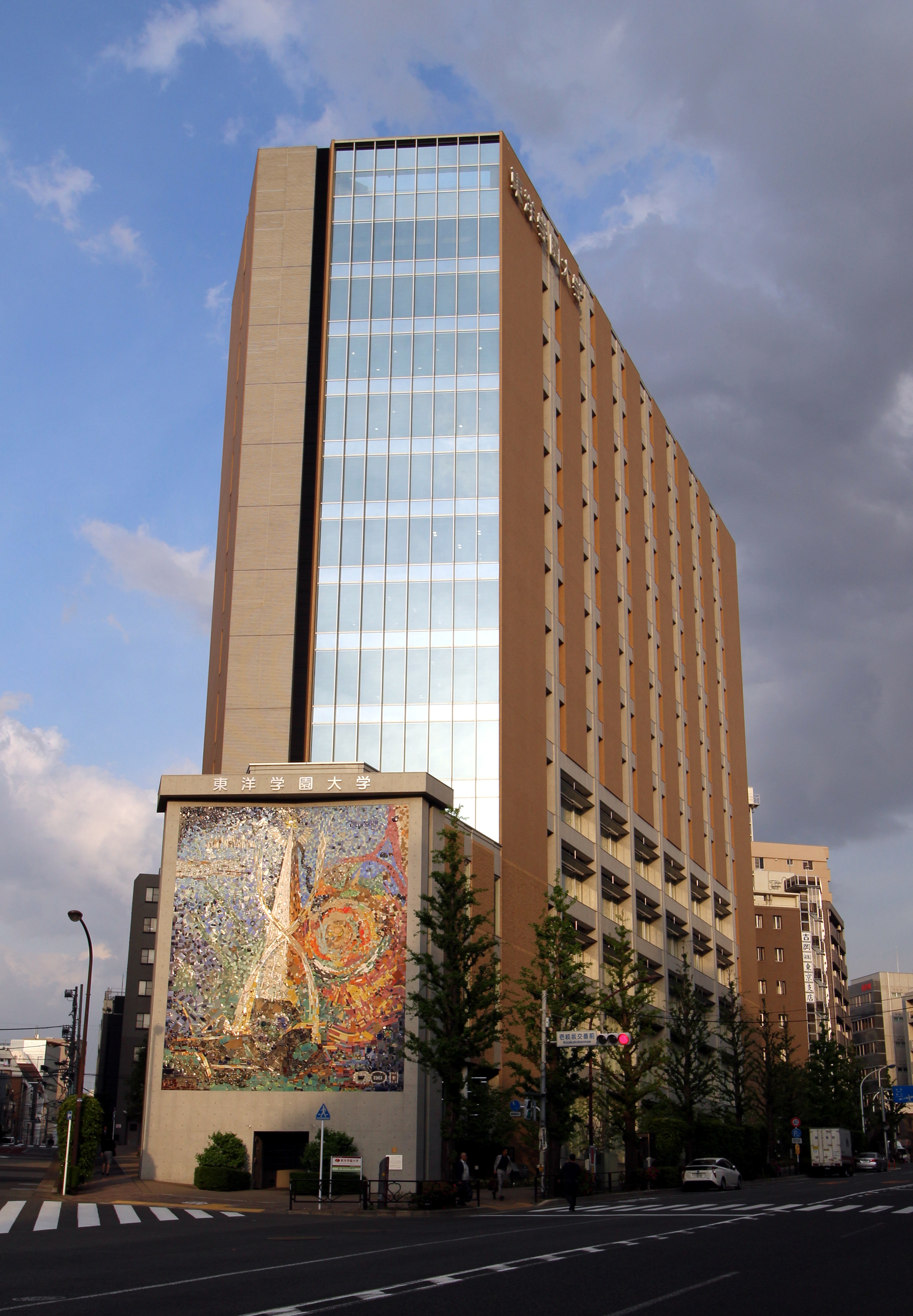
Toyo Gakuen University

Toyo Gakuen University (東洋学園大学, Tōyō Gakuen Daigaku), also known by the acronym TGU, founded in 1926, is a small private college located in the greater Tokyo area of Japan. The university has two campuses. The original campus, which presently houses the School of Business Administration, is located in downtown Tokyo, in Hongō, Bunkyō Ward. The school also has a larger campus in the city of Nagareyama, in Chiba Prefecture, about an hour away from the main campus by train. The Nagareyama campus is the home for TGU's Faculty of Humanities.
