= Nagareyama Station =

Railway station in Nagareyama, Chiba Prefecture, Japan

Nagareyama Station 流山駅
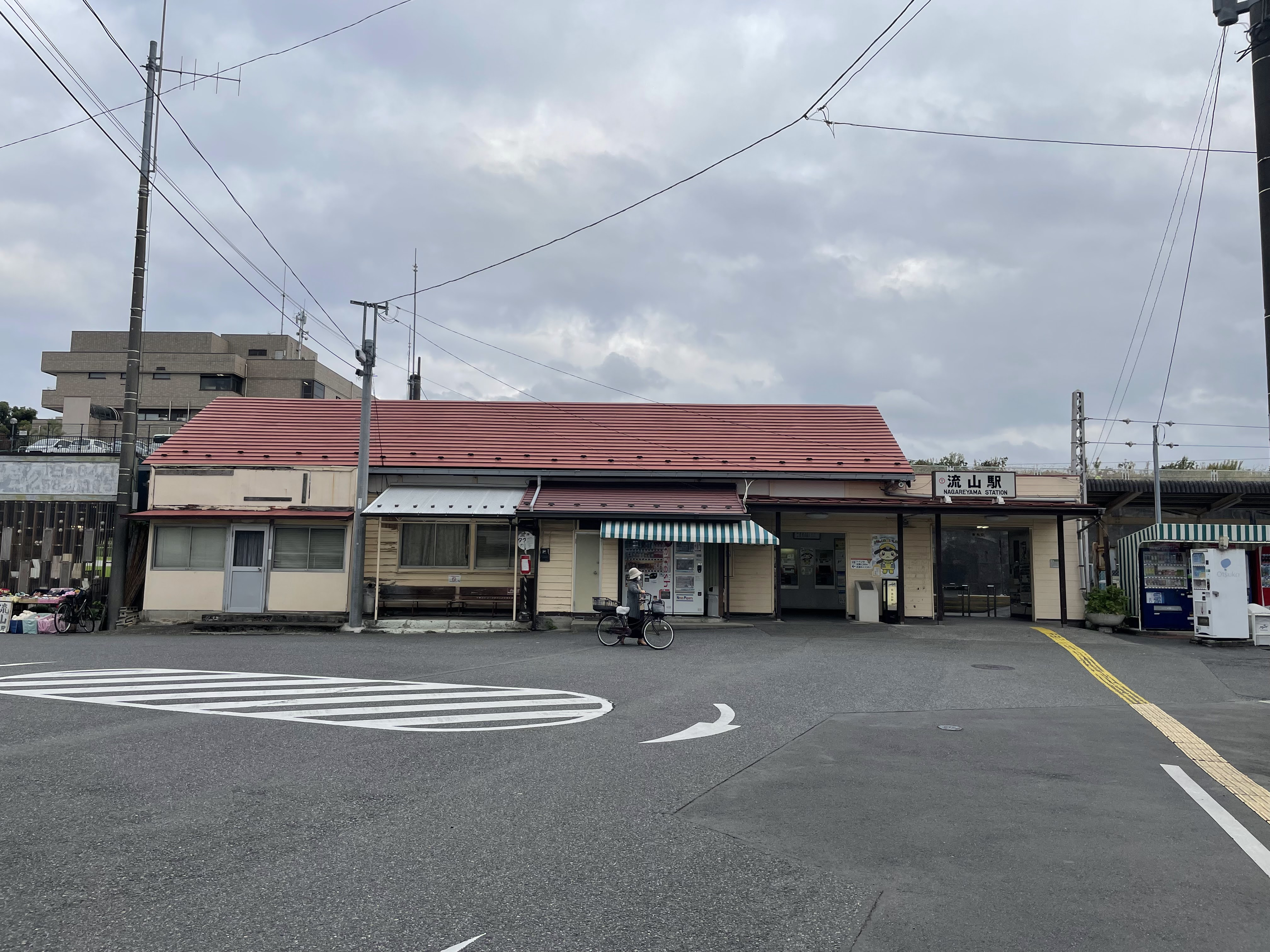
- Nagareyama Station November 2021

General information
- Location: 1-264 Nagareyama, Nagareyama-shi, Chiba-ken 270-0161; Japan
- Coordinates: 35.8559°N 139.9017°E
- Operator: Ryūtetsu
- Line: ■ Nagareyama Line
- Distance: 5.7 km from Mabashi
- Platforms: 1 island platform

Other information
- Station code: RN6
- Website: Official website

History
- Opened: March 14, 1916

Passengers
- FY2018: 2713 daily

Services
Preceding station	Ryutetsu	Following station
Heiwadai towards Mabashi	Nagareyama Line	Terminus
Location
- Location within Chiba Prefecture Location within Japan

Nagareyama Station (流山駅, Nagareyama-eki) is a passenger railway station located in the city of Nagareyama, Chiba Prefecture, Japan operated by the private railway operator Ryūtetsu. It is numbered station RN6.

== Lines ==
Nagareyama Station is the terminus of the Nagareyama Line, and is located 5.7 km from the opposing terminus of the line at Mabashi Station.

== Station layout ==
The station consists of one island platform.

== History ==
Nagareyama Station was opened on March 14, 1916.

== Passenger statistics ==
In fiscal 2018, the station was used by an average of 2713 passengers daily.

== Surrounding area ==
- Nagareyama City Hall
- site of Kondo Isami jin'ya

== See also ==
- List of railway stations in Japan
