= Mabashi Station =

Railway station in Matsudo, Chiba Prefecture, Japan

JL24 Mabashi Station 馬橋駅
- Mabashi Station, July 2024

General information
- Location: Mabashi, Matsudo-shi, Chiba-ken 271-0051; Japan
- Coordinates: 35°48′42″N 139°55′02″E
- Operator: JR East; Ryūtetsu
- Lines: Jōban Line (Local); ■ Nagareyama Line
- Distance: 19.1 km from Nippori
- Platforms: 2 island platforms

Other information
- Status: Staffed
- Website: www.jreast.co.jp/estation/station/info.aspx?StationCd=1449

History
- Opened: August 6, 1898

Passengers
- FY2019: 24,335 daily

Services
| Preceding station | JR East | Following station |
|---|---|---|
| Kita-Matsudo JL23 towards Ayase | Jōban Line (Local) Local-Kankō | Shim-Matsudo JL25 towards Toride |
| Preceding station | Ryutetsu | Following station |
| Terminus | Nagareyama Line | Kōya towards Nagareyama |
Location
- Location within Chiba Prefecture Location within Japan

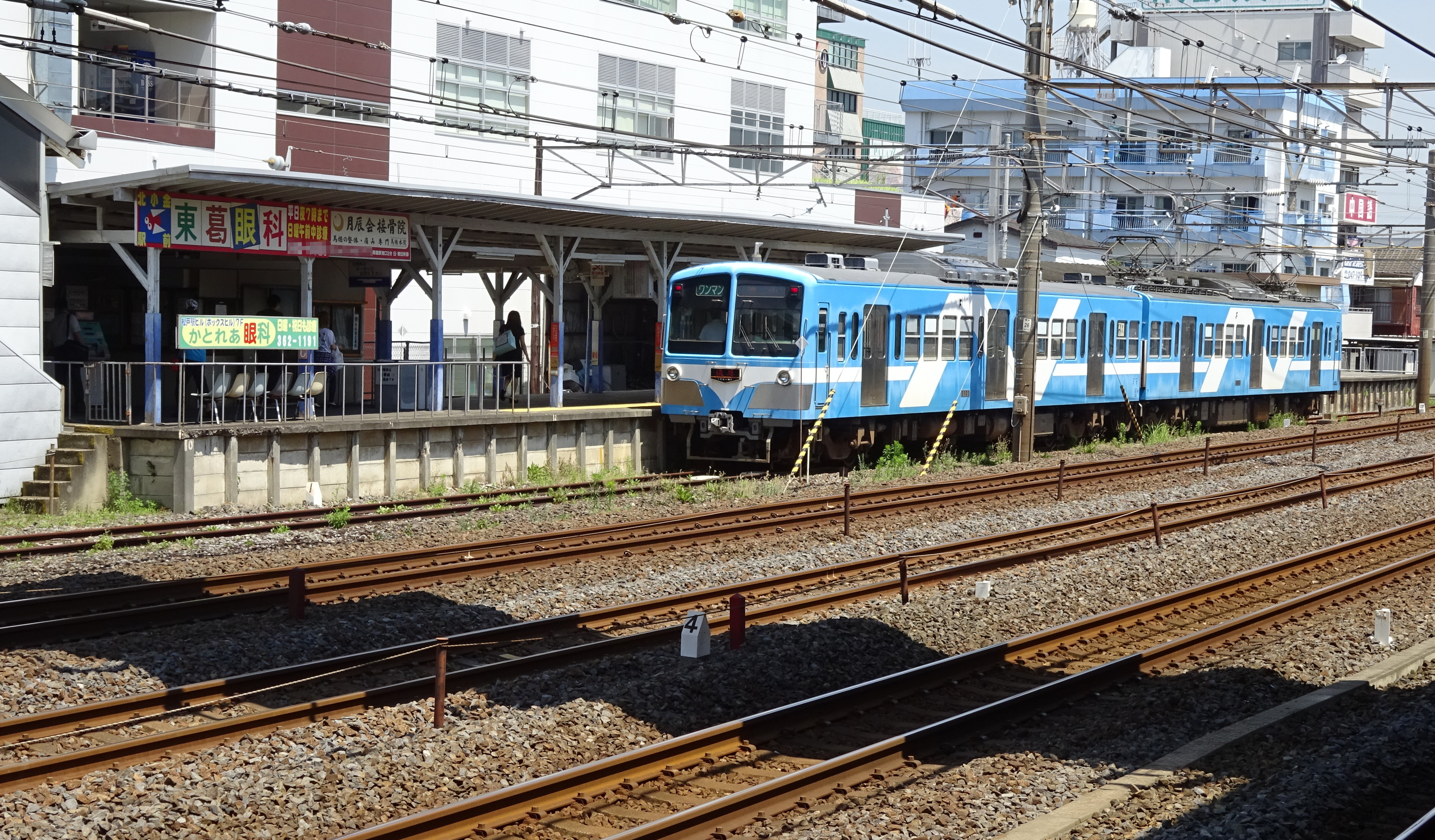
Ryutetsu Mabashi Station, June 2016

Mabashi Station (馬橋駅, Mabashi-eki) is an interchange passenger railway station in the city of Matsudo, Chiba, Japan, operated by East Japan Railway Company (JR East) and the private railway operator Ryūtetsu.

== Lines ==
Mabashi Station is served by the Jōban Line from Ueno in Tokyo, and is 19.1 kilometers from the official starting point of the Jōban Line at Nippori Station. It is the terminus of the 5.7 kilometer Ryūtetsu Nagareyama Line.

== Station layout ==
The station consists of two island platforms, one each for the Jōban Line and the Nagareyama Line. The station is staffed.

=== Platforms ===
==== JR ====
| 1 | Jōban Line (local) | for Kashiwa, Abiko, and Toride |
| 2 | Jōban Line (local) | for Matsudo, Ayase; Tokyo Metro Chiyoda Line for Kita-senju, Nishi-nippori and Yoyogi-uehara |

==== Nagareyama Line ====
| 1 | ■ Nagareyama Line | for Kōya and Nagareyama |
| 2 | ■ Nagareyama Line | for Kōya and Nagareyama (only used during rush hours) |

== History ==
Mabashi Station opened on August 6, 1898 as a station on the Nippon Railway Tsuchiura Line. It was nationalised on November 1, 1906, becoming part of the Japanese Government Railways (JGR). The line name changed on October 12, 1909 to the Jōban Line. The privately owned Nagareyama Line began operations from Mabashi Station from March 14, 1916. Freight services from this station ceased on April 20, 1971, when the Jōban line was quadrupled. The station was absorbed into the JR East network upon the privatization of JNR on April 1, 1987.

== Passenger statistics ==
In fiscal 2019, the JR portion of the station was used by an average of 25,675 passengers daily. In fiscal 2018, the Ryutetsu portion of the station was used by an average of 1525 passengers daily.

== See also ==
- List of railway stations in Japan
