= Komoto =

Komoto or Kōmoto is a surname. Notable people with the surname include:

- Akira Komoto, Japanese artist and photographer
- Hiroto Kōmoto (born 1963), Japanese rock singer who has fronted bands such as The Blue Hearts, The High-Lows and The Cro-Magnons
- Hiroyuki Komoto (born 1979), Japanese football player
- Saburo Komoto (1950–2025), Japanese politician of the Liberal Democratic Party
