= Shinnyo =

Japanese Buddhist nun (1211-1282)

- 信如

Personal life
- Born: 1211
- Died: 1282 (aged 70–71)
- Parent: Shōen (father)
- Known for: Responsible for the restoration of the Chūgū-ji temple in Nara Prefecture

Religious life
- Religion: Buddhist

Senior posting
- Post: Nun

Shinnyo (信如; 1211 – after 1282) was a Japanese Buddhist nun in the 13th century who was largely responsible for the restoration of the Chūgū-ji temple in Nara Prefecture.

== Biography ==
Shinnyo's father was a poor scholar named Shōen. Shōen had written a Buddhist commentary titled Rokuchō no meimoku, which was the only thing of any value he possessed; after his death, Shinnyo and her sisters were able to make a living by charging scholars to view his work. The proceeds allowed Shinnyo sufficient leisure time to study Buddhism, and she became well-educated in Buddhist doctrine, composing a number of commentaries and studying under the monk Ze-Amidabutsu. In 1243, the priest Sōji submitted a petition to his uncle Eison, the founder of the Shingon Risshu sect, requesting that the Chūgū-ji temple be revived as a nunnery; Eison chose Shinnyo to head this project. The following year, Shinnyo decided to seek full ordination as a nun, an honour that had not been granted for several hundred years. She approached Eison's associate Kakujō requesting ordination, but was initially refused. Kakujō stated that he would only accept her request if he received a sign from Heaven, which he experienced shortly after his refusal. He therefore contacted Shinnyo and by 1249 had bestowed upon her the full precepts of a Buddhist nun (bhikkhuni).

Around 1262 Shinnyo moved to Chūgū-ji to begin the restoration work. Her initial efforts focused on the restoration of the Tenjukoku Shūchō Mandala, a large embroidered artwork commemorating Prince Shōtoku. Shinnyo's interest in the work stemmed from her researches into Shōtoku's mother, Princess Anahobe no Hashihito (穴穂部間人皇女, Anahobe no Hashihito no Himemiko), the patroness of Chūgū-ji, whose date of death was included in the mandala; it was Shinnyo's intention to hold a commemorative ceremony honouring Hashihito. After obtaining the mandala, Shinnyo took it on a fund-raising tour, and by 1282 had raised enough money to create a replica of the mandala and to fund the ceremony for Hashihito. During this time, she became moderately well known at the Imperial Court, and made patrons of many highly ranked ladies of the nobility.

In 1282 Shinnyo recorded her biography in a work known as the Ama Shinnyo ganmon ("Vows of Shinnyo"); this work emphasises the importance of her actions in the restoration of Chūgū-ji, and downplays the contributions of Eison and Sōji.
