= Chūgū-ji =

Buddhist temple in Japan

- 中宮寺
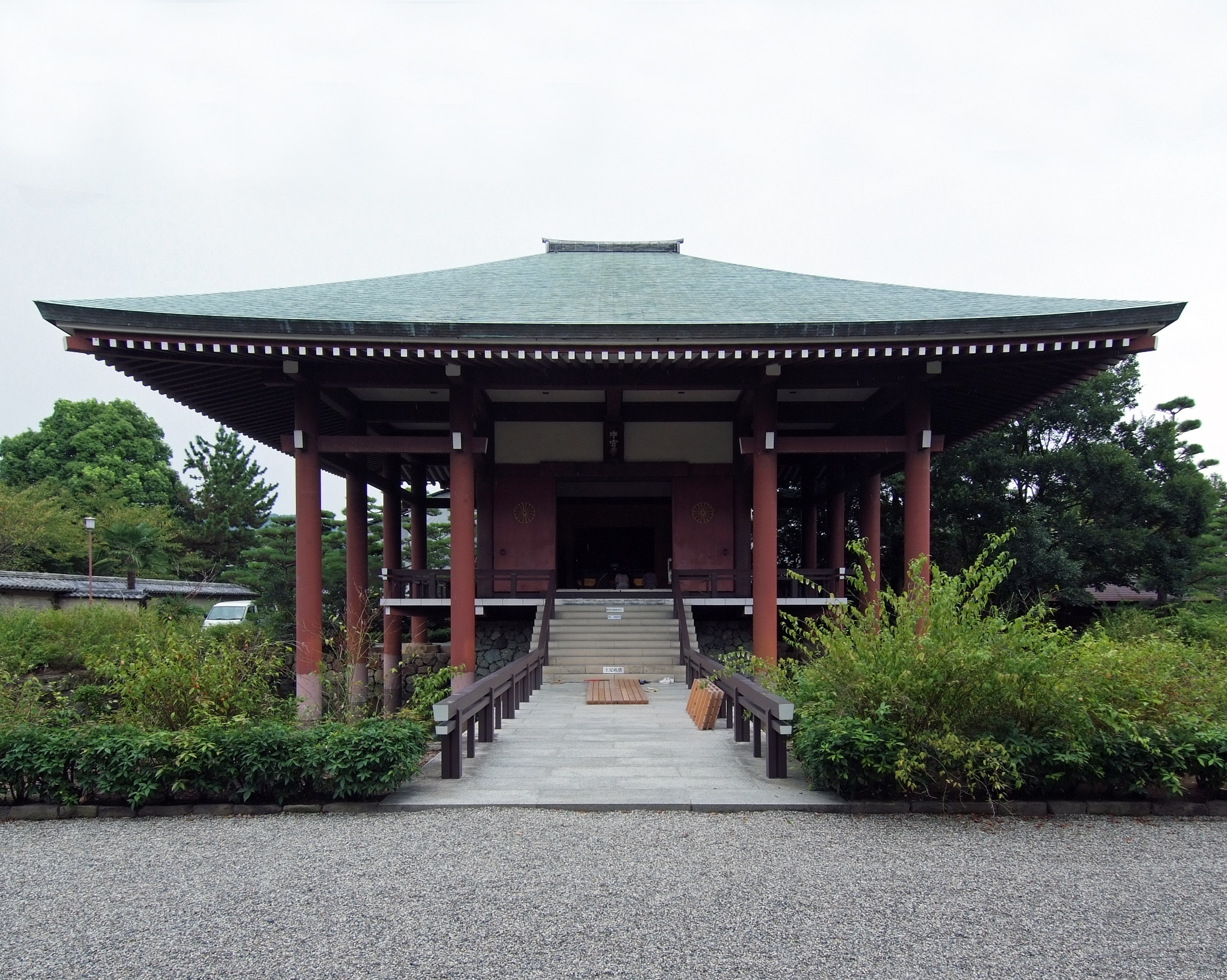
- Chūgū-ji Hondō

- Location within Nara Prefecture Location within Japan

Religion
- Affiliation: Buddhist
- Deity: Jūichimen Kannon
- Rite: Shōtokū-shu
- Status: functional

Location
- Location: 1-1-2 Horyuji-kita, Ikaruga-chō, Ikoma-gun, Nara-ken
- Country: Japan
- Coordinates: 34°36′54″N 135°44′22″E

Architecture
- Founder: Prince Shōtoku
- Completed: Asuka period
- National Treasure of Japan

Website
- Official website
- National Historic Site of Japan

Chūgū-ji (中宮寺) is a Buddhist temple located in the town of Ikaruga, Nara Prefecture, Japan. It was founded as a nunnery in the seventh century by Shōtoku Taishi. Located immediately to the northeast of Hōryū-ji, its statue of Miroku and Tenjukoku mandala are National Treasures. Chūgū-ji is one of three nunneries in Yamato whose chief priestesses were imperial princesses.

== History ==
Chūgū-ji is currently adjacent to the East Temple of Hōryū-ji, but when it was first built, it was located about 500 meters east , at a location which is now the Chūgū-ji Historical Site Park. The details of its foundation are uncertain, as there is no mention of the foundation of the temple in the Nihon Shoki, or other contemporary historical documentation. Per the Hōryū-ji Engi (747) and the "Jōgū Shōtoku Hōō Tei-setsu," it is said to be one of the "Seven Temples Built by Prince Shōtoku." Archaeological excavations on the former temple grounds suggest that it was founded in the early 7th century, around the same time as Hōryū-ji, and have uncovered roof tiles of the same type as those of Mukohara-ji (Sakurai Nunnery), which suggests that it was a nunnery from the beginning.

According to temple legend, the current principal image, Nyōirin Kannon, was the original principal image of the original Kondō. Per the Heian period "Prince Shōtoku's Calendar", the temple was established by Prince Shōtoku who converted the palace of his mother, Princess Hashihito no Anahobe after her death. A later legend emerged that Princess Hashihito herself was the initiator. The inscription on the back of the Kamakura period "Prince Shōtoku's Private Records" by Kenshin states that "It was called Chūgū-ji because it was the middle palace among the three palaces of Ashigamiya, Okamotomiya, and Ikaruganomiya, and it was named Chūgū-ji when it was established as a temple."

Chūgū-ji fell into decline after the Heian period, but was restored in the Kamakura period by the nun Shinnyo. At the time, the temple was converted from Hosso to the Shingon sect. Later, during the Sengoku period, the temple burned down. It is believed that it was moved to its current location around the end of the 16th century, when it became a monzeki monastery (a high-ranking temple where the head priest is a member of the imperial family or aristocrats for generations). In 1602, Chūgū-ji reverted to being a nunnery when an imperial princess was appointed, and the temple was also styled as the "Ikaruga Palace", which continues to exist to this day.

=== Miroku Bosatsu ===
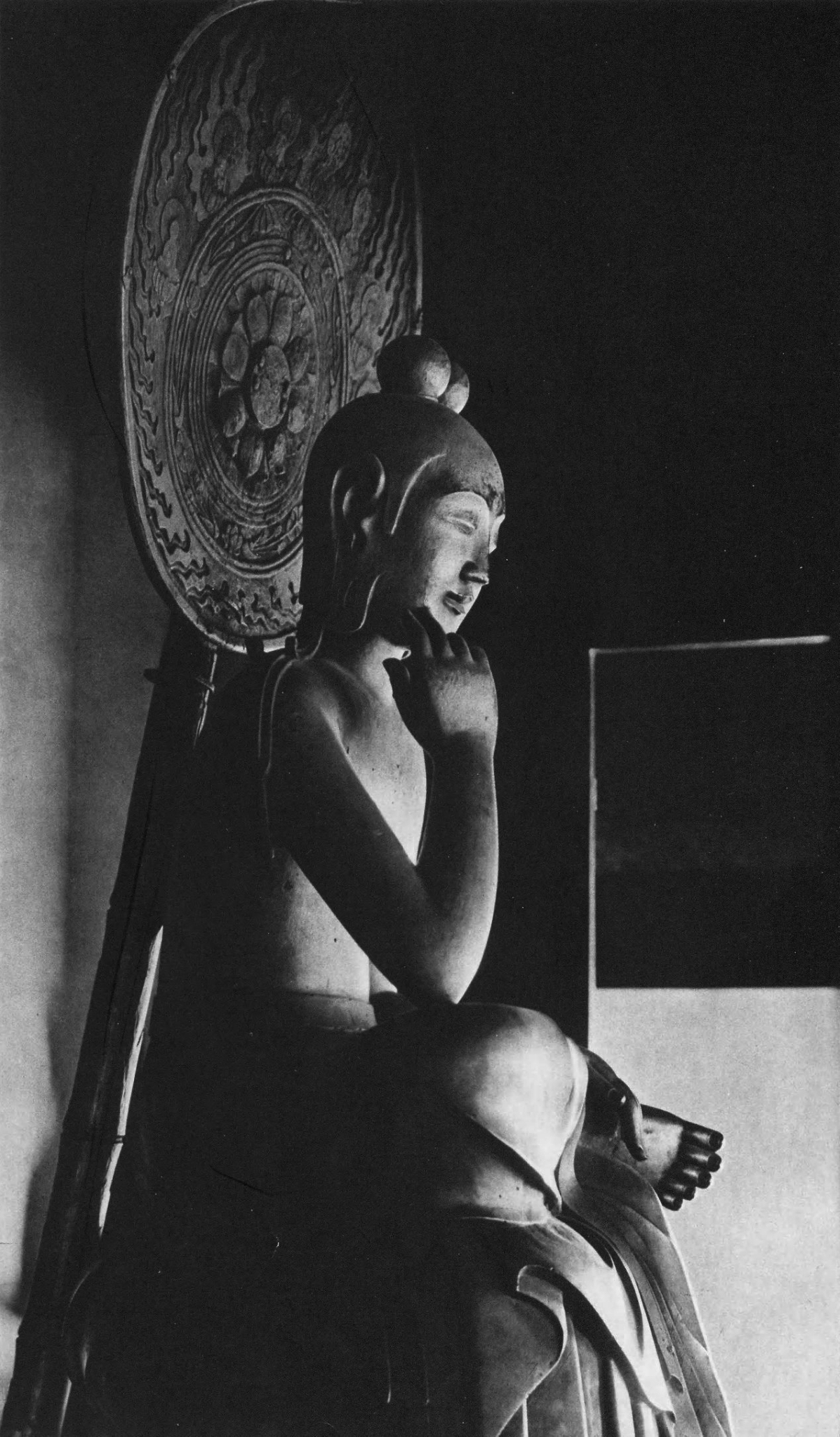
Miroku Bosatsu, a National Treasure

The camphor wood statue of Miroku (菩薩半跏像) is a National Treasure dating from the Asuka period. Formerly painted, it is finished in lacquer.

=== Tenjukoku Shūchō Mandala ===
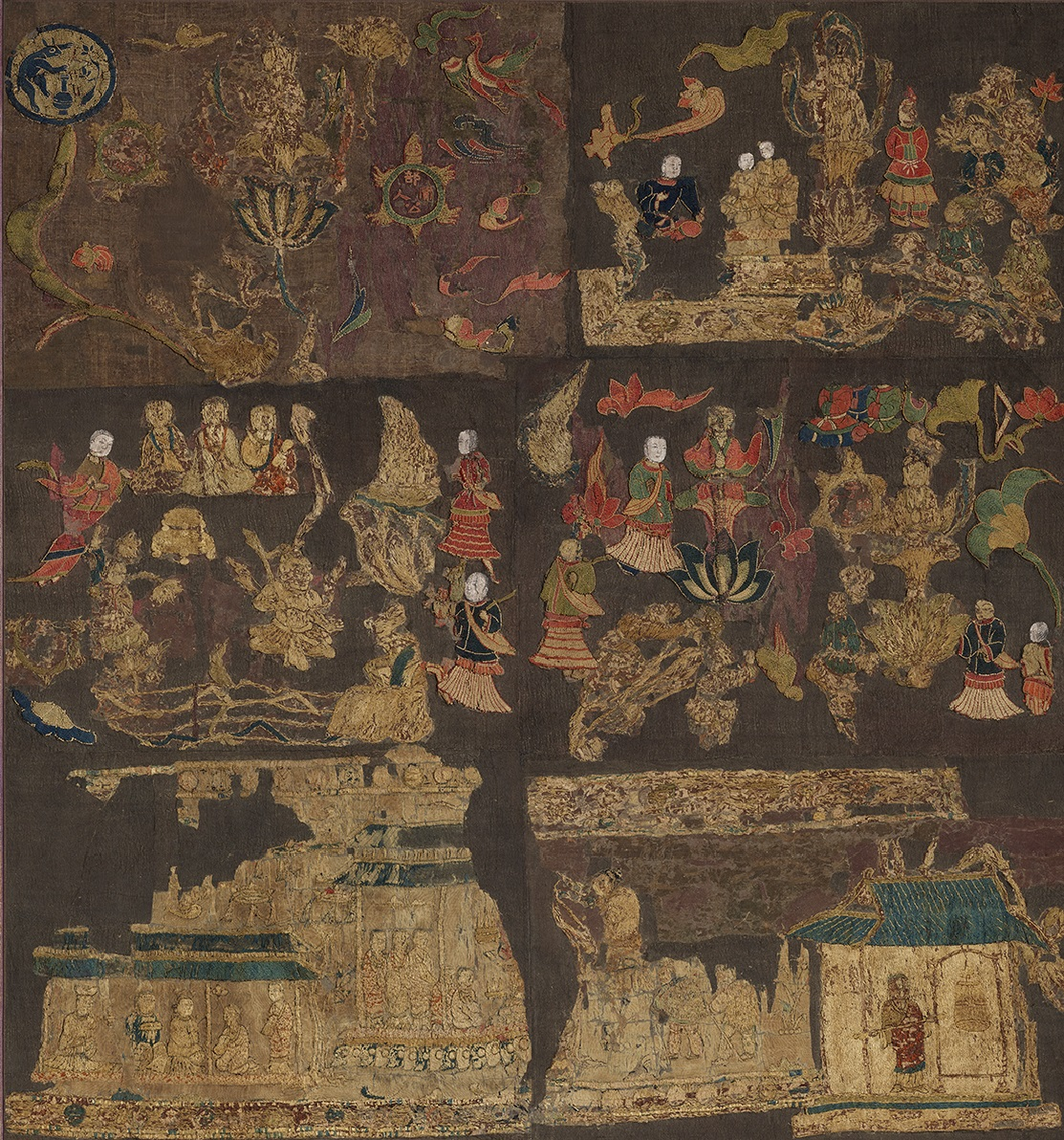
Tenjukoku Mandala, a National Treasure

After the death of Shōtoku Taishi in 622, his consort Tachibana-no-Oiratsume commissioned the Tenjukoku Shūchō Mandala (天寿国繍帳). The embroidery of heaven and eternal life, together with one hundred tortoises and accompanying text, was restored in the Edo period by combining the surviving fragments with parts of a Kamakura period replica.

== Chūgū-ji ruins (National Historic Site) ==
The site of Chūgū-ji at the time of its founding is located about 500 meters east of the current temple grounds, in Ikaruga-chō, Hōryūji Higashi 2-chōme, where an earthen platform thought to be the remains of a major building of the original temple complex resides. Archaeological excavations were conducted in 1963, and the remains of the foundations of the Main Hall and pagoda were discovered. It is known that the temple complex was arranged with the Main Hall to the north and the pagoda to the south, and was patterned similar to Shitennō-ji in Osaka. However, the remains of the Lecture Hall, corridors, etc., have not been found. One of the characteristics of this temple complex is that the Main Hall and pagoda were constructed in close proximity to each other, and it is assumed that they were built with their eaves touching. The core foundation of the pagoda is buried deep into the ground. This is similar to the core foundations of pagoda at Shitennō-ji, Asuka-dera, and Hōryū-ji, suggesting that it was built long ago.

After several subsequent excavations, the remains of the embankments on the north and west sides were discovered, and it was found that the temple grounds were about 130 meters east-to-west and 165 meters north-to-south. The 130 meter dimension was of interest, as it is longer than one Chō (101.9 meters), but is roughly equivalent to one Chō of the system used in ancient Goryeo. The embankments were 2.1 meters wide at its base, and is surrounded by an outer moat that is 2.5 meters wide and 0.7 meters deep. Parts of the north and south gates, as well as an ancient north-south road that runs parallel to the western embankment were also found.

The excavated roof tiles date from the Asuka to the Muromachi periods, and the single-petal lotus-patterned round eaves tile from the temple's founding is of the same type as the items excavated from Heiryu-ji in Heguri, and consists of Baekje and Goguryeo-style round eaves tiles. Both have been found to have been produced at Imaike tile kiln (Misato-cho, Ikoma-gun, Nara Prefecture), and are dated to the first half of the 7th century. In addition, round roof tiles with a honeysuckle six-petal lotus motif of the same type as those excavated from the Wakakusa Garan of Hōryū-ji, and flat roof tiles with a honeysuckle arabesque motif of the same type as those excavated from the underground remains of the East Compound of Hōryū-ji, which is believed to be the remains of Ikaruga Palace, have also been excavated.

The site was designated a National Historic Site in 1990, with the area under protection expanded in 2001. In May 2018, the remains of the temple were developed and completed as the Chūgū-ji Ruins Historical Park.

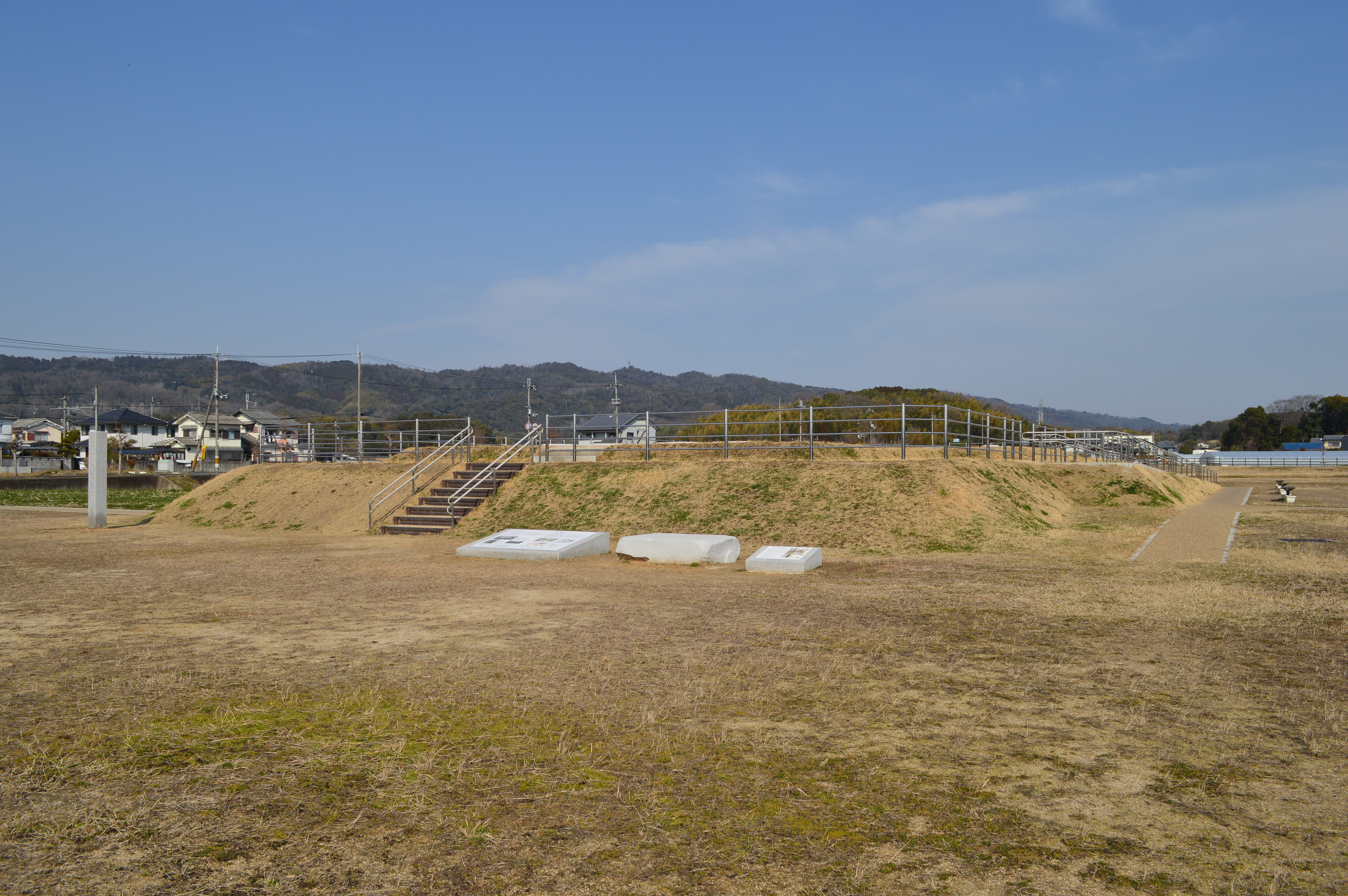
Chūgū-ji ruins

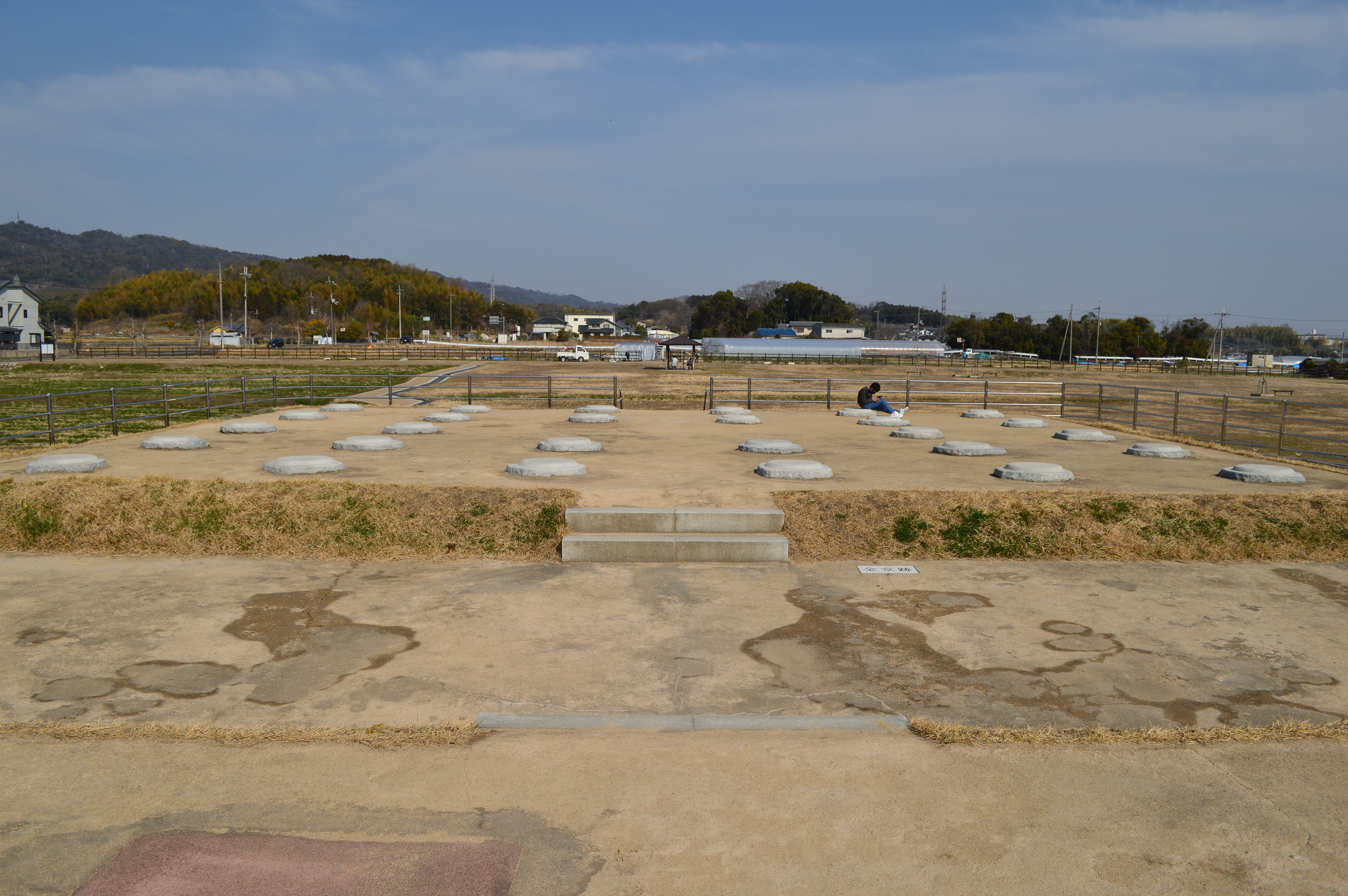
Chūgū-ji ruins Kondo site

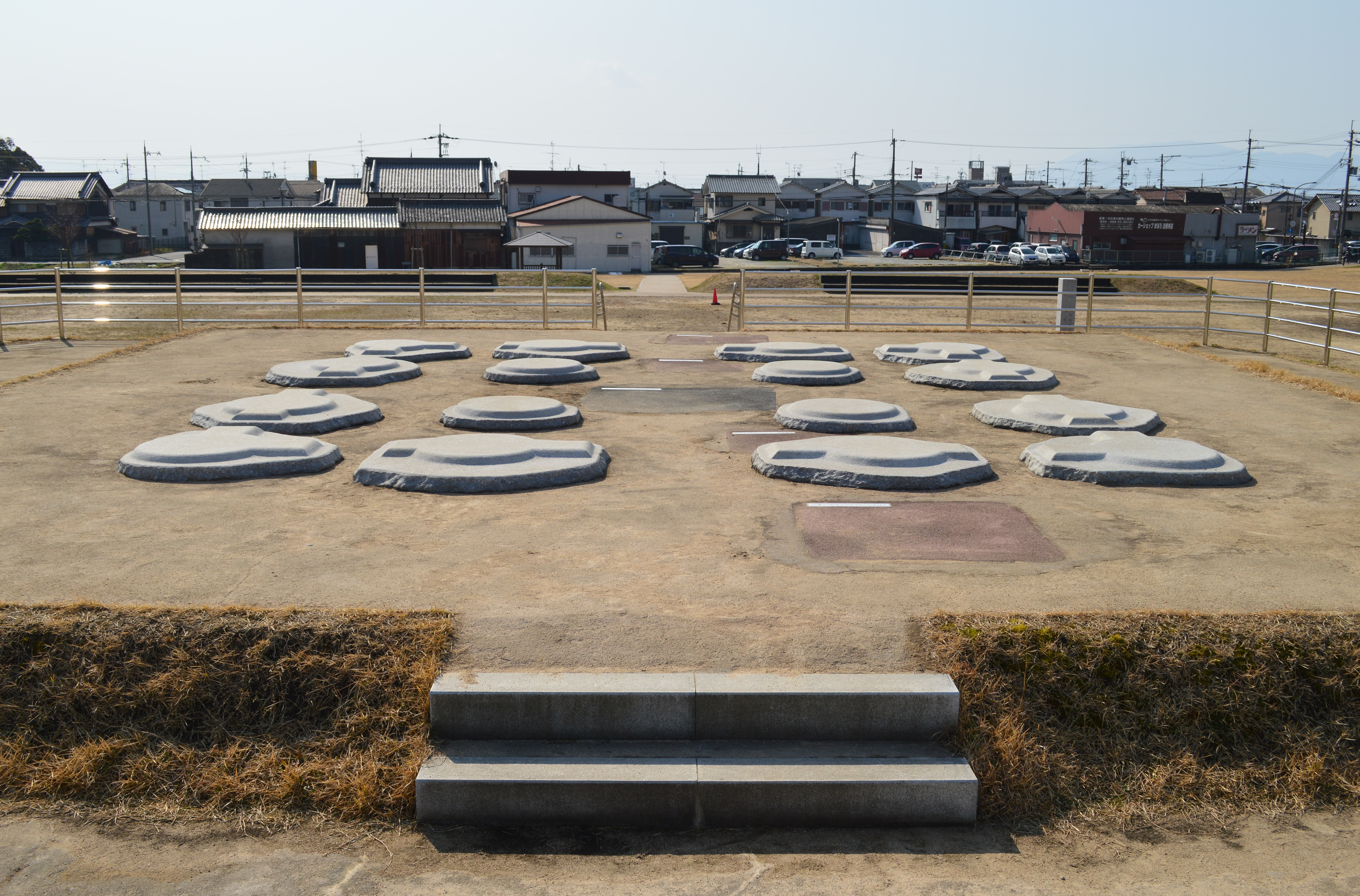
Chūgū-ji ruins Pagoda site

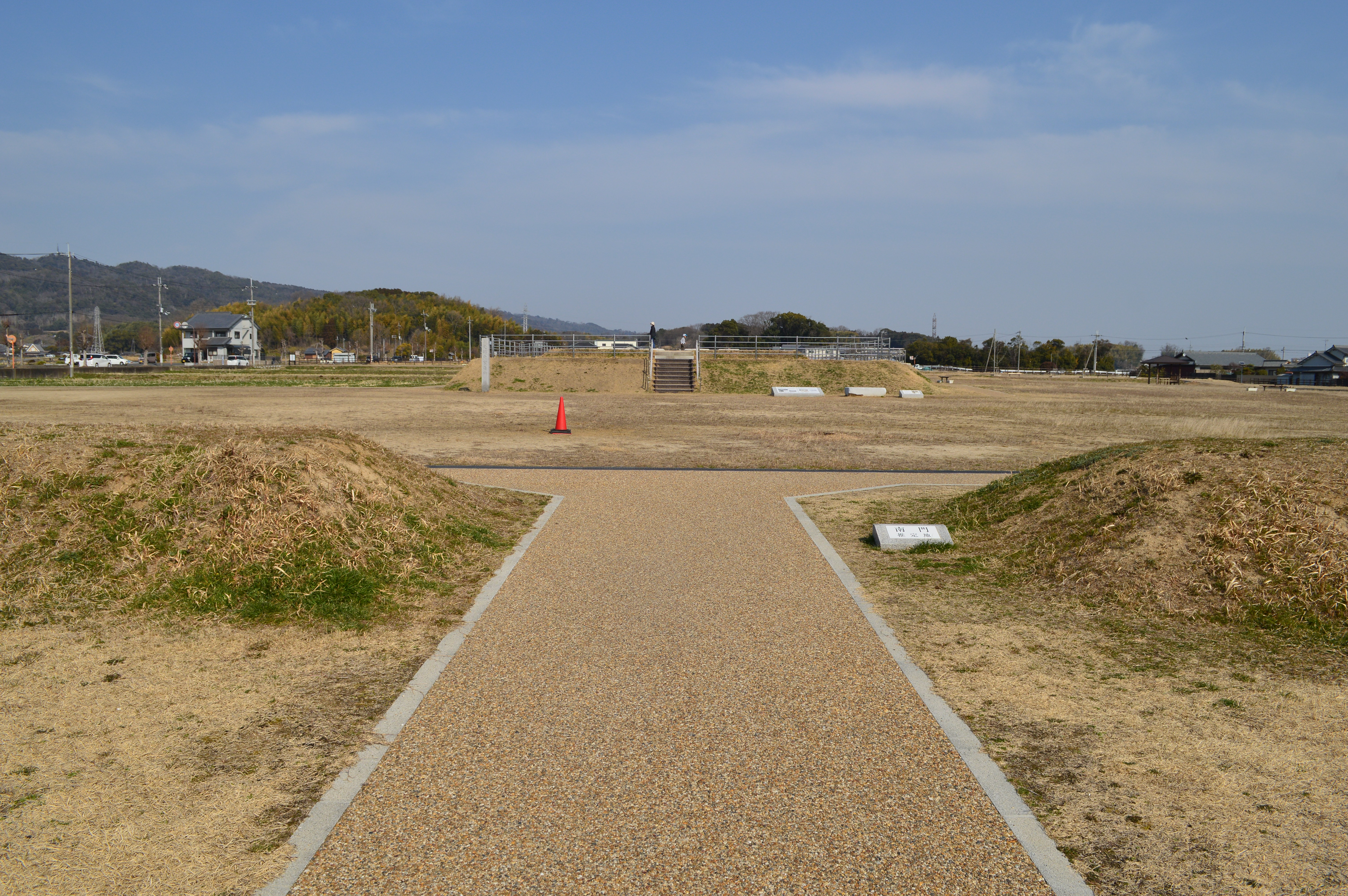
Chūgū-ji ruins projected South Gate site

== See also ==
- Hōryū-ji
- Shōtoku Taishi
- List of National Treasures of Japan (sculptures)
- List of National Treasures of Japan (crafts: others)
- List of Historic Sites of Japan (Nara)
