= Prince Yamashiro =

Japanese prince (died 643)

Prince Yamashiro 山背大兄王
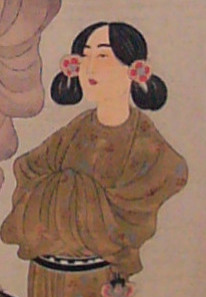
- Died: December 30, 643; Hōryū-ji
- Cause of death: Suicide by hanging
- Spouse: Princess Tsukishine
- Issue: Prince Naniwa; Prince Maro; Yuge no Ōkimi; Princess Sasa; Princess Mishima; Prince Kouka; Prince Owari
- House: Imperial House of Japan
- Father: Prince Shōtoku
- Mother: Tojiko no Iratsume

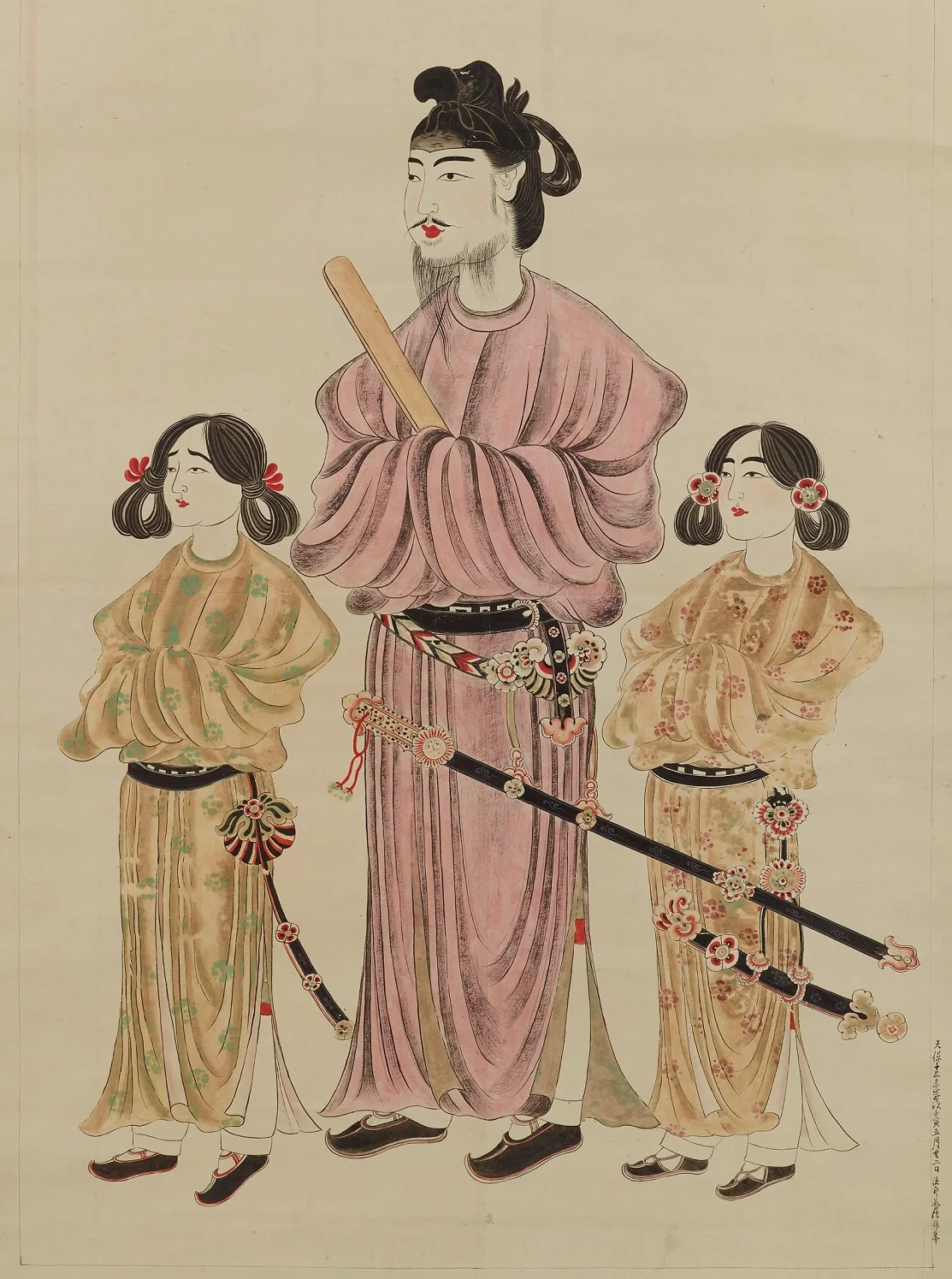
Yamashiro (right) with his father Prince Shotoku (center) and uncle Eguri (left).

Prince Yamashiro (山背大兄王, Yamashiro no Ōe no Ō; died 643) was the eldest son of one of the most famous figures in Japanese history, Prince Shōtoku. Yamashiro claimed the right to Imperial succession in 628, following the death of Empress Suiko. However, he lost the claim to Prince Tamura who ascended to the throne as Emperor Jomei, having enjoyed the support of powerful court noble Soga no Emishi. He and his family committed suicide when their home was attacked by Emishi's son, Soga no Iruka, in 643. Some scholars believe Yamashiro to have been the poet-scholar Sarumaru no Taifu, about whom nearly nothing is known.

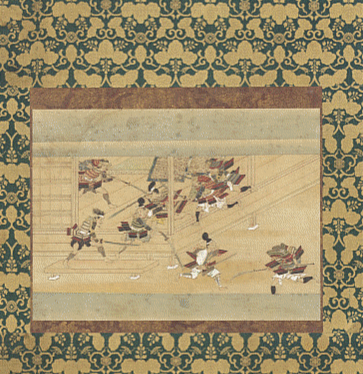
Soga-No-Irukas attack on Prince Yamashiro.
