= Gifu Shotoku Gakuen University =

Higher education institution in Gifu Prefecture, Japan

Gifu Shotoku Gakuen University 岐阜聖徳学園大学
- Gifu Shōtoku Gakuen Daigaku
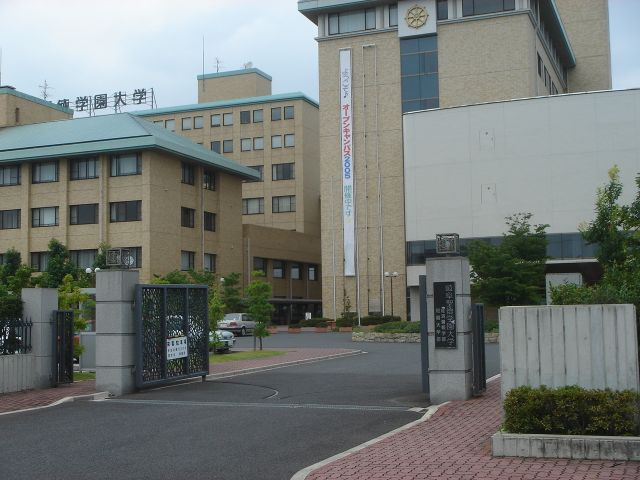
- Type: Private university
- Established: 1972
- Location: Gifu, Gifu Prefecture, Japan
- Campus: Gifu Campus 35°23′13.5″N 136°44′10.3″E Hashima Campus 35°21′40.6″N 136°42′24.3″E
- Website: Official website

Gifu Shotoku Gakuen University (岐阜聖徳学園大学, Gifu Shōtoku Gakuen Daigaku) is a private university in the city of Gifu, Gifu Prefecture, Japan.

Named after the 7th-century Prince Shōtoku, the school was founded in 1972 as the Gifu College of Education (聖徳学園岐阜教育大学, Shōtoku Gakuen Gifu Kyōiku Daigaku) and adopted the present name in 1998. Its name is sometimes abbreviated to Shōtoku (聖徳) or Gishōdai (岐聖大).

It has main campuses in both Gifu and nearby Hashima, as well as a junior college campus in Gifu.

== Faculty ==
Teachers have included:

- Akira Komoto
