= Akira Komoto =

Japanese artist and photographer (1935–2017)

- 小本 章
- Born: Masaaki Komoto (小本 昌彰); 14 August 1935; Ōmori-ku, Tokyo (now Ōta), Japan
- Died: 2017 (aged 81–82)
- Education: Gifu University (1958); Tokyo University of Education (1962)
- Known for: Photography, screen printing, copy art
- Movement: VAVA
- Awards: Grand Prize, Seibu Museum of Art Print Grand Prize (1984); National Museum of Modern Art, Tokyo Prize (1985)

Akira Komoto (小本 章, Komoto Akira; born Masaaki Komoto, 小本 昌彰; 14 August 1935 – 2017) was a Japanese artist and photographer. After taking part in the avant-garde group VAVA in Seki, Gifu, he began in 1974 the Seeing series, in which objects placed in the landscape are painted the colour of the background they hide and then photographed. He was known for work using reproduction technologies such as photography, silkscreen and photocopying, and his works are in collections including the National Museum of Modern Art, Tokyo and the Kunstmuseum Düsseldorf.

== Life ==
=== Early life ===
Komoto was born in Ōmori-ku, Tokyo, and soon moved to his mother's home town of Seki in Mugi District, Gifu Prefecture. His mother's family ran a shop selling sundries; as a child he learned to paint with paints kept in the family storehouse for decorating the shop window, and he took up photography with his grandfather's camera, setting up a darkroom in the house. A junior high school art teacher introduced him to oil painting and Dada, and he gave up his plan to become an architect. In 1951, while a student at Gifu Prefectural Seki High School, he won the city prize in the high-school section of the first Seki City Art Exhibition.

=== Early career and VAVA ===
Komoto graduated from the Faculty of Education of Gifu University in 1958 and completed the research course in constructive design at the Tokyo University of Education in 1962. He showed at the Shinseisaku Association exhibition from 1954 to 1961 and received its New Artist Award in 1961. He held his first solo exhibition at Hiroshi Gallery, Tokyo, in 1959 and showed at the Yomiuri Indépendant exhibition from 1960 to 1962. In 1962 he showed at the Maruzen Oil Art Award selection exhibition, and in 1962 and 1964 at the International Young Artists exhibition in Tokyo.

He was the youngest member of VAVA, an avant-garde group formed at the call of Kazumi Nishio, a doctor and artist in Seki. In 1962 he took part in "14 Japanese Artists" at the Osgood Gallery in New York, and in 1964 in VAVA's exhibition at the National Museum of Fine Arts in Rio de Janeiro. In 1965 he showed at "Trends in Contemporary Art" at the National Museum of Modern Art, Kyoto, and in 1965–66 he received an honourable mention at the Shell Art Award exhibition. In May 1965 he held a two-person exhibition with Akio Goto of VAVA at Gallery 16 in Kyoto, showing works using fluorescent lights. At the Independent Art Festival held by VAVA in Gifu in August of that year he showed a "device using light", and he wrote about the festival's outdoor venue in the magazine Gendai Bijutsu.

He showed at the Mainichi French Government Scholarship competition exhibition in 1966 and 1967 and in the invited section of the 8th Contemporary Art Exhibition of Japan in 1968. From the late 1960s he taught at junior colleges in Gifu Prefecture.

=== Events and silkscreen ===
In 1970 Komoto began making silkscreen works in New York. From 1971 he was an instructor at Kodansha Famous Schools, and from 1972 to 1974 he was an associate professor at Gifu College of Education (now Gifu Shotoku Gakuen University).

In this period he also staged outdoor events. In 1971 he held the "Seed Event" in Yoyogi Park, matching points on a map of Tokyo with real places. In 1972, as part of Tokyo Earth Day, he held the "Earth's Axis Event" in Kinuta, Setagaya: a white cloth 340 metres long was laid on the ground, and a Cessna drew a line of white smoke 1,000 metres above it.

=== Seeing and international exhibitions ===
In 1974 Komoto placed a card painted with a gradation from red to green between a red and a green tomato growing on the same plant in a field and photographed it in colour. This was the start of his photographic work. In 1976 he held solo exhibitions at the Muramatsu Gallery and elsewhere in Tokyo, and took part in "Seven Italian Artists and Seven Japanese Artists" at the Italian Cultural Institute in Tokyo.

In the 1970s he also showed widely in group exhibitions in Japan and abroad: in 1974 at "Signifying" at the Kyoto Municipal Museum of Art and in an exhibition of serigraphs by Japanese artists at the Museum of Contemporary Art, University of São Paulo; in 1976 at an exhibition of contemporary Japanese art at a gallery of the University of Melbourne and at the 11th Japan Art Festival (Ueno Royal Museum, touring to the United States); in 1977 at the first Japan Contemporary Print Grand Prize exhibition and the 12th International Biennial of Graphic Arts in Ljubljana; and in 1979 at Japan Art Festival '79 at the National Museum of Art, Osaka and the Muzeum Sztuki in Łódź.

From the late 1970s he showed regularly in Poland. He held a solo exhibition in Poznań in 1977, took part in the exhibition "WAY" in Wrocław in 1980, and in 1981 held a solo exhibition that opened at the Photo Medium Art Gallery in Wrocław and toured the country. In 1981 he visited the United States at the invitation of the US government.

In the early 1980s he worked in winter on the Asama Plateau, and in 1983 he showed at "Photography in Contemporary Art" at the National Museum of Modern Art, Tokyo and the National Museum of Modern Art, Kyoto. He won the Grand Prize at the 2nd Seibu Museum of Art Print Grand Prize exhibition in 1984 and the National Museum of Modern Art, Tokyo Prize at the 17th Contemporary Art Exhibition of Japan in 1985; both prize-winning works entered the museum's collection. From around 1984 he often worked on the shore of Lake Biwa. In 1986 he donated a group of his works to the Museum of Fine Arts, Gifu.

=== Düsseldorf and Kyoto ===
At the Osaka Triennale 1990 Komoto received the special prize of the Goethe-Institut Osaka and the city of Düsseldorf, and he stayed in a guest studio of the city. In 1991 he held a solo exhibition at the Kunstmuseum Düsseldorf, which acquired 59 of his works. He continued to work on the banks of the Rhine and on the Aegean Sea. In 1991 he was one of six artists from Japan in the exhibition "New Space of Photography" in Wrocław.

In 1993 the Kanagawa Prefectural Gallery held the exhibition "Contemporary Artists Series '93: Akira Komoto and Koichi Moriguchi". From 1994 he taught at the graduate school of Joshibi University of Art and Design, and in the same year he edited New Image Technique, a book introducing the works and techniques of ten younger artists.

In 1996 he moved to Yamashina-ku, Kyoto, and became a lecturer at the Kyoto University of Art and Design. In the same year he stayed in Spain as an invited artist of the International Museum of Electrography (MIDE) in Cuenca. In June 1996 he made works in public at Art Tower Mito and was a panellist at its forum "The Future of Photography". In 1998 the Museum of Fine Arts, Gifu held his solo exhibition "Communion with Landscape", and a CD-ROM of his works, Akira Komoto Photo-Picture, was published. In 1999 he held "SEEING '99 – Photographic Works" with Yuri Nagawara at the Hermann-Harry-Schmitz-Societät in Düsseldorf.

Komoto died in 2017. In 2025 the Museum of Fine Arts, Gifu showed a special display of his works from its collection, and an exhibition on VAVA was held in Seki.

== Work ==
=== Method ===
For the Seeing series, Komoto placed canvases, illustration boards, driftwood, mirrors and other objects outdoors, by lakes or on high plateaus. Standing a few metres away at a fixed viewpoint, he painted each object in gouache the same colour as the sky or water it hid. From that viewpoint the object seemed to vanish into the landscape, and he photographed this moment on colour slide film. He finished the large colour prints together with laboratory technicians.

In the 1980s he also made works that used reproduction technology itself as a medium, such as exchanges of images by photocopier and collaborations with artists abroad by fax.

=== In his own words ===
On the source of his ideas, Komoto wrote: "In my case, what prompts an idea is always 'something in nature'." Looking back on his work in Düsseldorf, he wrote: "I like blue sky. The blue sky is the only universe we can see in the daytime."

=== Reception ===
The art critic Yūsuke Nakahara wrote about Komoto's work several times from 1976 and contributed the essay "Akira Komoto and Photography" to the catalogue of his 1986 solo exhibition. The catalogue of "Photography in Contemporary Art" at the National Museum of Modern Art, Tokyo presented his work as showing, through colour photography, the relationship between artificial and natural colour. In the catalogue of the 1991 Düsseldorf exhibition, Peter Dunas discussed his work with reference to René Magritte's The Treachery of Images as an attempt to question the way we see things.

== Collaborations ==
From around 1984 Komoto worked with the artist Yuri Nagawara, making series such as COPY-LETTER 84, in which they exchanged images by photocopier. In 1985 they held a two-person exhibition of image exchange by copier at the Oji Paper Gallery in Tokyo, and in 1988 they published the book Hikari no hanga together. Their joint work Hand in Hand is in the collection of the Museum of Fine Arts, Gifu.

In June 1989, as part of "Art Exciting '89" at the Museum of Modern Art, Saitama, he collaborated with the Australian artist Pat Hoffie, each sending images by fax from their own country. The work was shown in Brisbane the same year.

== Exhibitions ==
=== Solo exhibitions ===
- 1959 – Hiroshi Gallery, Tokyo
- 1974 – Shirota Gallery, Tokyo
- 1976 – Muramatsu Gallery and Fujiyoshi Gallery, Tokyo
- 1977 – Akumulatory 2 Gallery, Poznań
- 1981 – Ai Gallery, Tokyo (also 1983 and 1985)
- 1981 – Photo Medium Art Gallery, Wrocław, and tour of Poland
- 1983 – Homecoming exhibition, Seki City Culture Hall
- 1991 – "Arbeiten aus Japan und Düsseldorf", Kunstmuseum Düsseldorf
- 1998 – "Communion with Landscape", Museum of Fine Arts, Gifu
- 1999 – "SEEING '99 – Photographic Works" (with Yuri Nagawara), Hermann-Harry-Schmitz-Societät, Düsseldorf

=== Group exhibitions ===
- 1962 – "14 Japanese Artists", Osgood Gallery, New York
- 1964 – VAVA exhibition, National Museum of Fine Arts, Rio de Janeiro
- 1965 – "Trends in Contemporary Art", National Museum of Modern Art, Kyoto
- 1974 – "Signifying", Kyoto Municipal Museum of Art
- 1976 – "Seven Italian Artists and Seven Japanese Artists", Italian Cultural Institute, Tokyo
- 1977 – 12th International Biennial of Graphic Arts, Ljubljana
- 1979 – Japan Art Festival '79, National Museum of Art, Osaka, and Muzeum Sztuki, Łódź
- 1983 – "Photography in Contemporary Art", National Museum of Modern Art, Tokyo and Kyoto
- 1989 – "Art Exciting '89", Museum of Modern Art, Saitama
- 1990 – "Printed Art", Yamaguchi Prefectural Museum of Art
- 1991 – "New Space of Photography", Wrocław
- 1993 – "Contemporary Artists Series '93: Akira Komoto and Koichi Moriguchi", Kanagawa Prefectural Gallery
- 1996 – "Mito Annual '96", Art Tower Mito
- 2025 – Special feature "Akira Komoto", Museum of Fine Arts, Gifu

== Collections ==
=== Japan ===
- National Museum of Modern Art, Tokyo
- National Museum of Modern Art, Kyoto
- Museum of Modern Art, Kamakura & Hayama
- Museum of Modern Art, Saitama
- Tochigi Prefectural Museum of Fine Arts
- Museum of Fine Arts, Gifu
- Museum of Contemporary Art Tokyo
- Tokyo Photographic Art Museum
- Nakanoshima Museum of Art, Osaka
- Iwaki City Art Museum
- Tokushima Modern Art Museum

=== Outside Japan ===
- Kunstmuseum Düsseldorf (now Kunstpalast), Germany
- Muzeum Sztuki, Łódź, Poland
- Municipal photography collection, Wrocław, Poland

== Publications ==
- Silkscreen no yōgu to gihō (Silkscreen tools and techniques). Bijutsu Shuppan-sha, 1979.
- Silkscreen no hassō to tenkai (Ideas and development in silkscreen). Bijutsu Shuppan-sha, 1980.
- With Yuri Nagawara. Hikari no hanga (Prints of light). Bijutsu Shuppan-sha, 1988.
- Komoto Akira sakuhinshū (Akira Komoto: Works). Bijutsu Shuppan-sha, 1991.
- (Editor) New image technique. Bijutsu Shuppan-sha, 1994.
