= Tokyo Seiei College =

Private college in Tokyo, Japan

Coordinates: 35°43′04.40″N 139°51′24.17″E

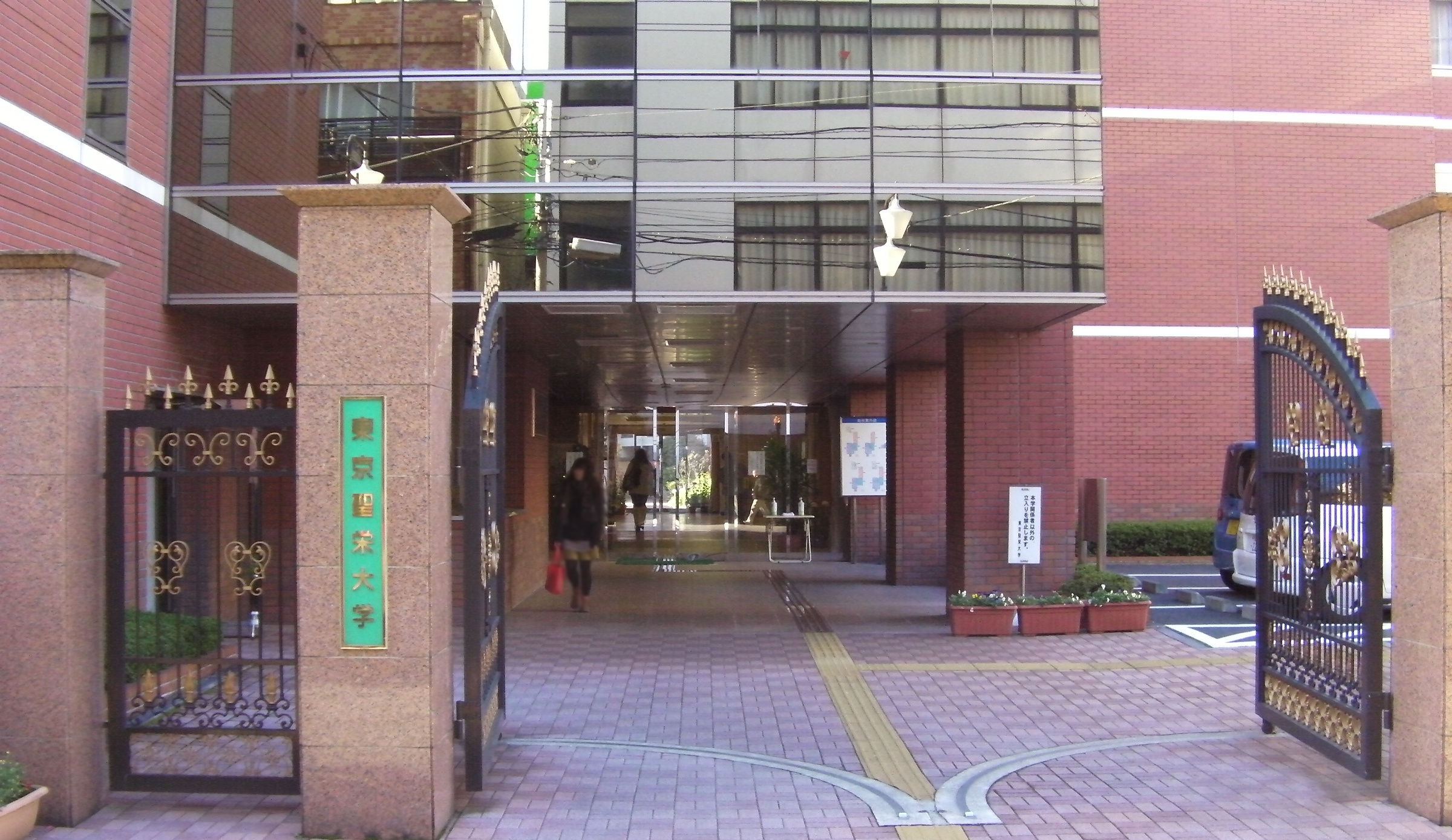
Entrance gate to Tokyo Seiei College

Tokyo Seiei College (東京聖栄大学, Tōkyō seiei daigaku) is a private four-year college in Katsushika, Tokyo, Japan founded in 2005 to replace Seitoku Junior College of Nutrition, which was founded in 1947 and chartered as a junior college in 1963. Its name, Sei-ei is how its predecessor was abbreviated in Japanese: Sei (聖) stands for Seitoku and Ei (栄) is for "nutrition".
