= Seitoku Junior College of Nutrition =

Seitoku Junior College of Nutrition (聖徳栄養短期大学, Seitoku Eiyō Tanki Daigaku) was a private junior college at Katsushika Ward, Tokyoin Japan. It was succeeded by the newly established Tokyo Seiei College.

== History ==
- Olympia Gakuen was established in 1947.
- The Seitoku Advanced School of Nutrition (高等栄養学校) is founded in 1954. It was named after the 7th-century regent Shōtoku. Shō (Go'on reading) can also be read sei (Kan'on reading), the latter was chosen for this school.
- It was reorganized into the Seitoku Vocational School of Nutrition (栄養専門学校 Eiyō Senmon-gakkō) in 1957.
- Seitoku Junior College of Nutrition (栄養短期大学) was established 1963. The first year included 50 students, including 5 males.
- The evening school was set up in 1964.
- The Department of Food and Nutrition was renamed Department of Food and Nutritional Studies in 1969.
- The special training program on food studies was set up in 1972, but was abolished in 1983.
- In 1986, the Department of Food and Nutritional Studies was separated into:
  - major in Nutritional Studies
  - major in Food Science
- It became officially co-educational in 1987; however, in practice, it remained effectively a women's university.
- The advanced course food nourishment major in 1996 is set up.
- Endeavours were undertaken to make it more co-ed again in 2001.
- Professional confectionery, baking, and cooking classes were offered as part of the food science major in 2003.
- It stopped recruiting new students in the fiscal year 2004 and would be eventually replaced by Tokyo Seiei College.

== Subjects ==
- Food nourishment
  - Day school
    - Food nourishment major
    - Food science major
  - Nighttime: started in 1985, with 20 students, of whom 4 were males.

== Advanced course ==
- Food nourishment major

== Special course ==
- The food major: with cook training facilities.
