= Gifu Shotoku Gakuen Junior College =

- 岐阜聖徳学園大学短期大学部
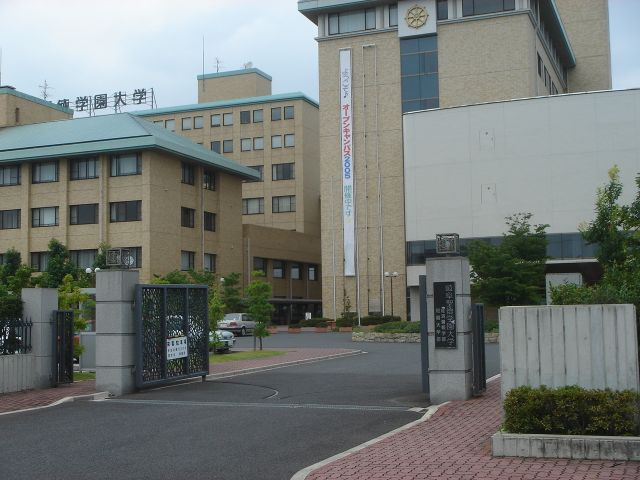
- Gifu Shotoku Gakuen University entrance
- Type: Private junior college
- Established: 1966
- Location: Gifu, Gifu, Japan
- Website: www.shotoku.ac.jp/tanki

Gifu Shotoku Gakuen Junior College (岐阜聖徳学園大学短期大学部, Gifu Shotoku Gakuen Daigaku Tanki Daigakubu) is a private junior college in the city of Gifu, Gifu, Japan.

== History ==
Named after the 7th-century Prince Shōtoku, the college opened in April 1966 for women. It became coeducational in 1998.

== See also ==
- Gifu Shotoku Gakuen University
