= Princess Tsukishine =

Japanese princess during the Asuka period

Princess Tsukishine 舂米女王
- Died: December 30, 643
- Spouse: Prince Yamashiro
- Issue: Prince Naniwa, Yuge no Ōkimi and others
- House: Imperial House of Japan
- Father: Prince Shōtoku
- Mother: Kashiwade no Iratsume

Princess Tsukishine (舂米女王; also known as Princess Kamitsumiya no Iratsume no Miko (上宮大娘姫王)) was a Japanese princess and daughter of Prince Shōtoku during the Asuka period. She married her half brother, Prince Yamashiro.

== Life ==
She was born to Prince Shōtoku and a concubine named Kashiwade no Iratsume.

She is quoted once in the Nihon Shoki under the reign of Empress Kōgyoku after the Soga clan employed relatives of Prince Shōtoku to work on their ancestral tombs;

Princess Kamitsumiya no Iratsume no Miko, indignant, lamented thus: "The Soga ministers wield the reins of state at will, committing countless acts of insolence. There cannot be two suns in the heavens, nor two sovereigns upon the earth. By what right could they have disposed of the imperial prince's vassals as they pleased?"

In 643 Soga no Iruka sent Kose no Tokuta, Haji no Ite, Ōtomo no Nagatoko and 100 soldiers to Prince Yamashiro's residence, Ikaruga Palace, in order to assassinate him. Ultimately Yamashiro committed suicide. It is believed that Prince Yamashiro's family, including his wife also killed themselves.

== Genealogy ==
Parents

- Father: Prince Shōtoku (聖徳太子, February 7, 574 – April 8, 622)
- Mother: Kashiwade no Iratsume 膳大郎女, d. April 7, 622)

Husband and children

- Prince Yamashiro, husband and half brother
  - Son: Prince Naniwa (難波王; ? - after 692)
  - Son: Prince Maro (麻呂古王; ? - ?)
  - Son: Yuge no Ōkimi (弓削王; d. January 5, 644)
  - Daughter: Princess Sasa (佐々女王; ? - ?)
  - Daughter: Princess Mishima (三嶋女王; ? - ?)
  - Son: Prince Kouka (甲可王; ? - ?)
  - Son: Prince Owari (尾治王; ? - ?)
