= Tokushima Modern Art Museum =

- Location: Bunka-no-mori-park, hachiman-cho, Tokushima-shi, Tokushima, 770-8070, Japan
- Coordinates: 34.0398218°N 134.5245188°E
- Type: Museum, Contemporary art museum
- Website: Tokushima Modern Art Museum

Tokushima Modern Art Museum (徳島県立近代美術館, Tokushima Kenritsu Kindai Bijutsukan) is a prefectural art museum in Japan

== Collection ==
Tokushima Modern Art Museum permanent collection includes works by Western and Japanese artists, like Picasso, Klee, Kiyokata Kaburagi, Seishi Kishimoto, Antony Gormley.

== Notable exhibitions ==
In 2015 Tokushima Modern Art Museum exhibited western works from Tokyo Fuji Art Museum collection, summarizing 300 years of western art, starting from baroque paintings by Anthony van Dyck, including work by Jean-Baptiste Camille Corot, Pierre-Auguste Renoir, Claude Monet and up to modern works by Moise Kisling. Japanese artist Yutaka Moriguchi had solo exhibition in the museum in 2011. In 2008 the museum held International Print exhibition, which included works by James Turrell.

== Forgery controversy ==
During the bubble years of the 1980s and 90s Japanese art collectors bought numerous famous artworks from Europe. In 1999 the Tokushima Art Museum purchased a painting it believed was a cubist painting entitled “At the Cycle-Race Track” by French painter Jean Metzinger (1883-1956) for ¥67.2 million.

Over the years the museum exhibited it roughly four times, as well as lending it to other museums for display.

In June 2024, they were contacted by someone suggesting to them that the painting was a fake. The museum decide on July 10 that they would no longer display the painting, as they accepted that it was a forgery. The infamous German art forger Wolfgang Beltracchi claims that this is indeed the case, and that the artwork was one of the paintings he forged roughly forty years ago.
