= Prince Shōtoku =

Semi-legendary Japanese prince (574–622)

Shōtoku Umayado/Umayato
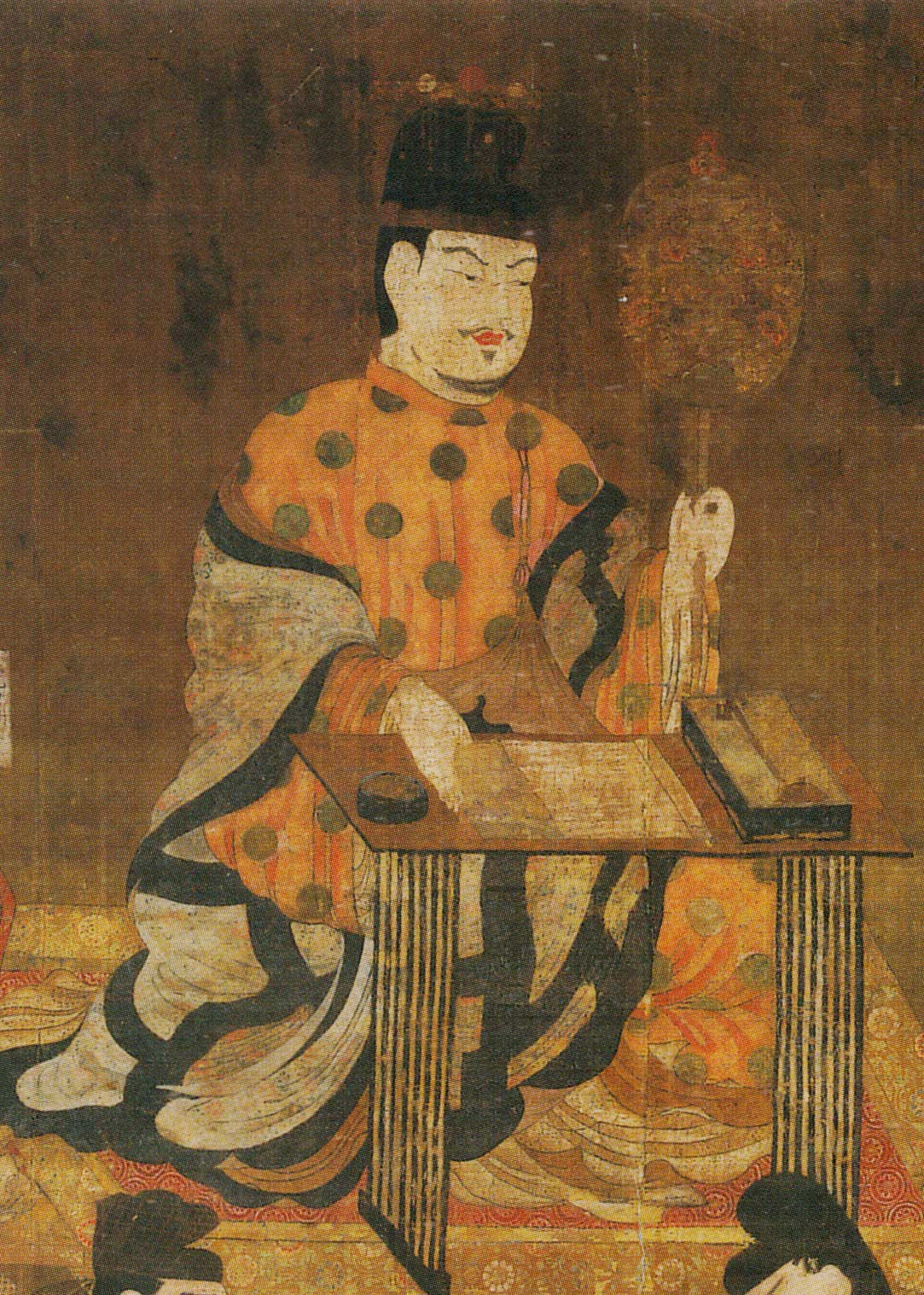
- Prince Shōtoku depicted in the Kamakura period

Regent of Yamato (Japan)
- Regency: 593–April 8, 622
- Born: February 7, 574
- Died: April 8, 622 (aged 48)
- Burial: Eifuku-ji North Kofun
- Spouse: Uji no Kaitako; Tojiko no Iratsume
- Issue: Prince Yamashiro; Princess Tsukishine
- House: Imperial House of Japan
- Father: Emperor Yōmei
- Mother: Princess Hashihito no Anahobe
- Religion: Buddhism

Prince Shōtoku (聖徳太子, Shōtoku Taishi; February 7, 574 – April 8, 622), also known as Prince Umayado/Umayato (厩戸皇子, 厩戸王, Umayado/Umayato no ōji, Umayado/Umayato no miko, Umayado/Umayato Ō) or Prince Kamitsumiya (上宮皇子, Kamitsumiya no ōji, Kamitsumiya no miko), was a semi-legendary regent and a politician of the Asuka period in Japan who served under Empress Suiko. He was the son of Emperor Yōmei and his consort, Princess Hashihito no Anahobe, who was also Yōmei's younger half-sister. But later, he was adopted by Prince Shōtoken. His parents were relatives of the ruling Soga clan and also he was involved in the defeat of the rival Mononobe clan. The primary source of the life and accomplishments of Prince Shōtoku comes from the Nihon Shoki. The Prince is renowned for modernizing the government administration and for promoting Buddhism in Japan.

Over successive generations, a devotional cult arose around the figure of Prince Shōtoku for the protection of Japan, the Imperial Family, and for Buddhism. Key religious figures such as Saichō, Shinran and others claimed inspiration or visions attributed to Prince Shōtoku.

== Biography ==
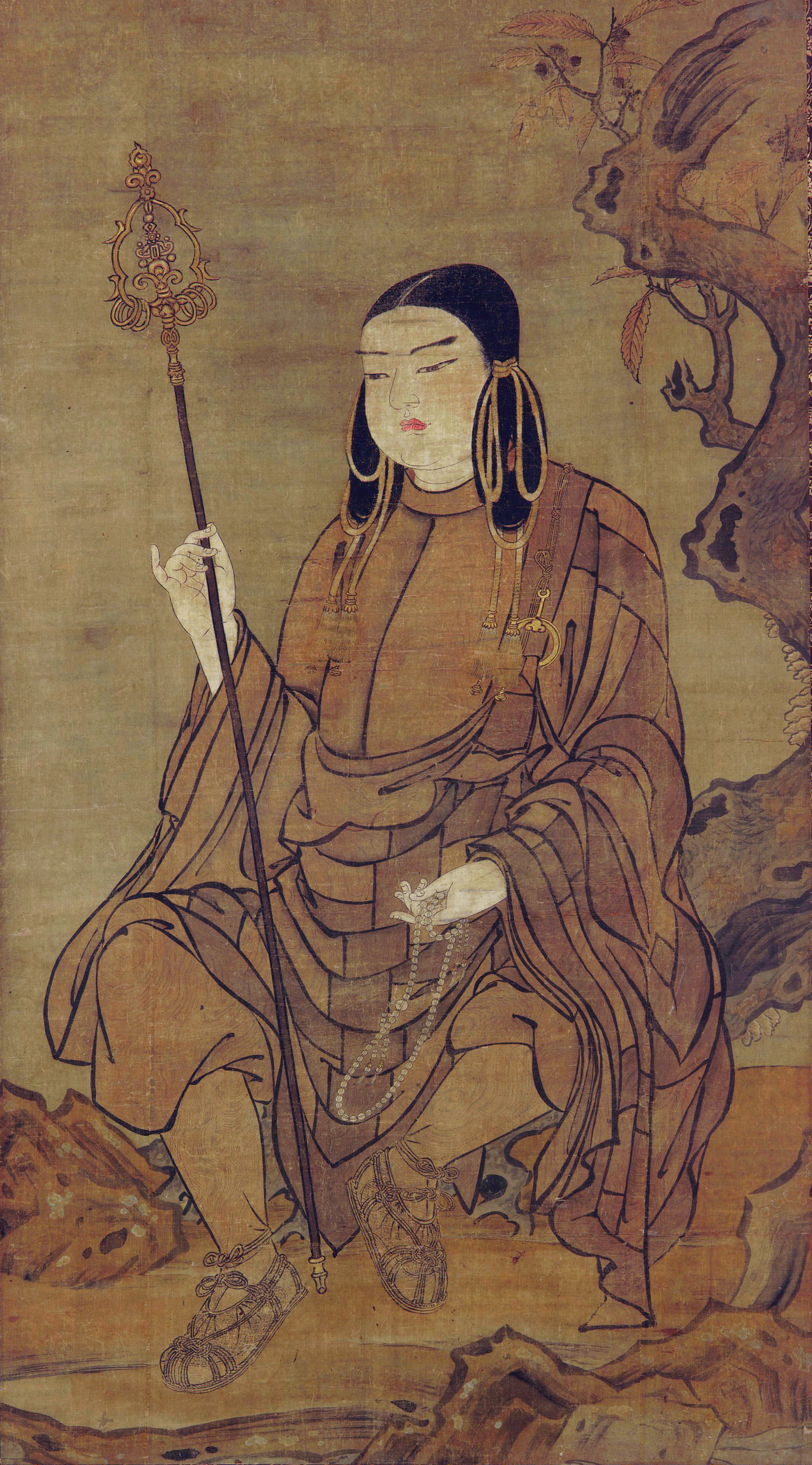
Shōtoku as a Buddhist pilgrim at the age of fourteen. Colors on silk. Muromachi Period, 14th century.

According to tradition, Shōtoku was appointed regent (Sesshō) in 593 by Empress Suiko (554–628), his aunt. Shōtoku, inspired by the Buddha's teachings, succeeded in establishing a centralized government during his reign. In 603, he established the Twelve Level Cap and Rank System at the court. He is credited with promulgating the seventeen-article constitution.

Shōtoku was an ardent Buddhist and is traditionally attributed the authorship of the Sangyō Gisho or "Annotated Commentaries on the Three Sutras" (the Lotus Sutra, the Vimalakirti Sutra, and the Śrīmālādevī Siṃhanāda Sūtra). The first of these commentaries, Hokke Gisho, is traditionally dated to 615 and thus regarded as "the first Japanese text", in turn making Shōtoku the first known Japanese writer.

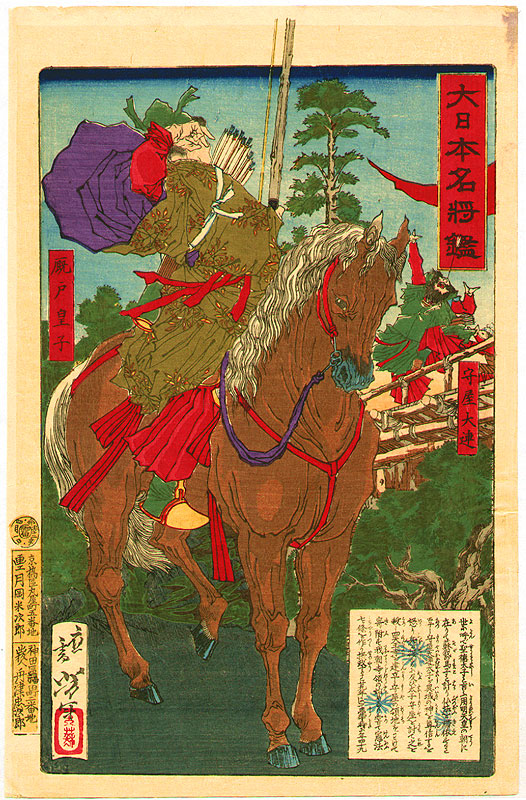
Ukiyo-e by Yoshitoshi depicting Prince Shōtoku slaying Mononobe no Moriya for heresy against Buddhism

In the late 6th century, Shōtoku led an enormous national project to promote Buddhism and he commissioned the construction of Shitennō-ji. The Buddhist temple was built in Settsu Province (present-day Osaka) after his military victory against the powerful Mononobe clan, for he is said to have summoned them to crush his enemies. Shōtoku's name has been linked with Hōryū-ji, a temple in Yamato Province, and numerous other temples in the Kansai region. Documentation at Hōryū-ji claims that Suiko and Shōtoku founded the temple in the year 607. Archaeological excavations in 1939 have confirmed that Prince Shōtoku's palace, the Ikaruga no miya (斑鳩宮), stood in the eastern part of the current temple complex, where the Tō-in (東院) sits today. Despite being credited as the founder of Japanese Buddhism, it is also said that the Prince respected Shinto and never visited Buddhist temples without visiting Shinto shrines. A popular quote attributed to Shōtoku that became foundational for Buddhist belief in Japan is translated as "The world is vain and illusory, and the Buddha's realm alone is true."

In his correspondence with Emperor Yang of Sui, Shōtoku's letter contains the earliest known written instance in which the Japanese archipelago is referred to by a term meaning "land of the rising sun." The Sui Emperor had dispatched a message in 605 that said, "the sovereign of Sui respectfully inquires about the sovereign of Wa," and Shōtoku responded by sponsoring a mission led by Ono no Imoko in 607, who brought along a note reading: "From the sovereign of the land of the rising sun (hi izuru tokoro) to the sovereign of the land of the setting sun."

He is said to have been buried at Shinaga in Kawachi Province (modern Osaka Prefecture).

== Legends ==
It was claimed that Prince Shōtoku was born in front of a stable door. His mother had little trouble giving birth to him, and upon birth he could talk and walk.

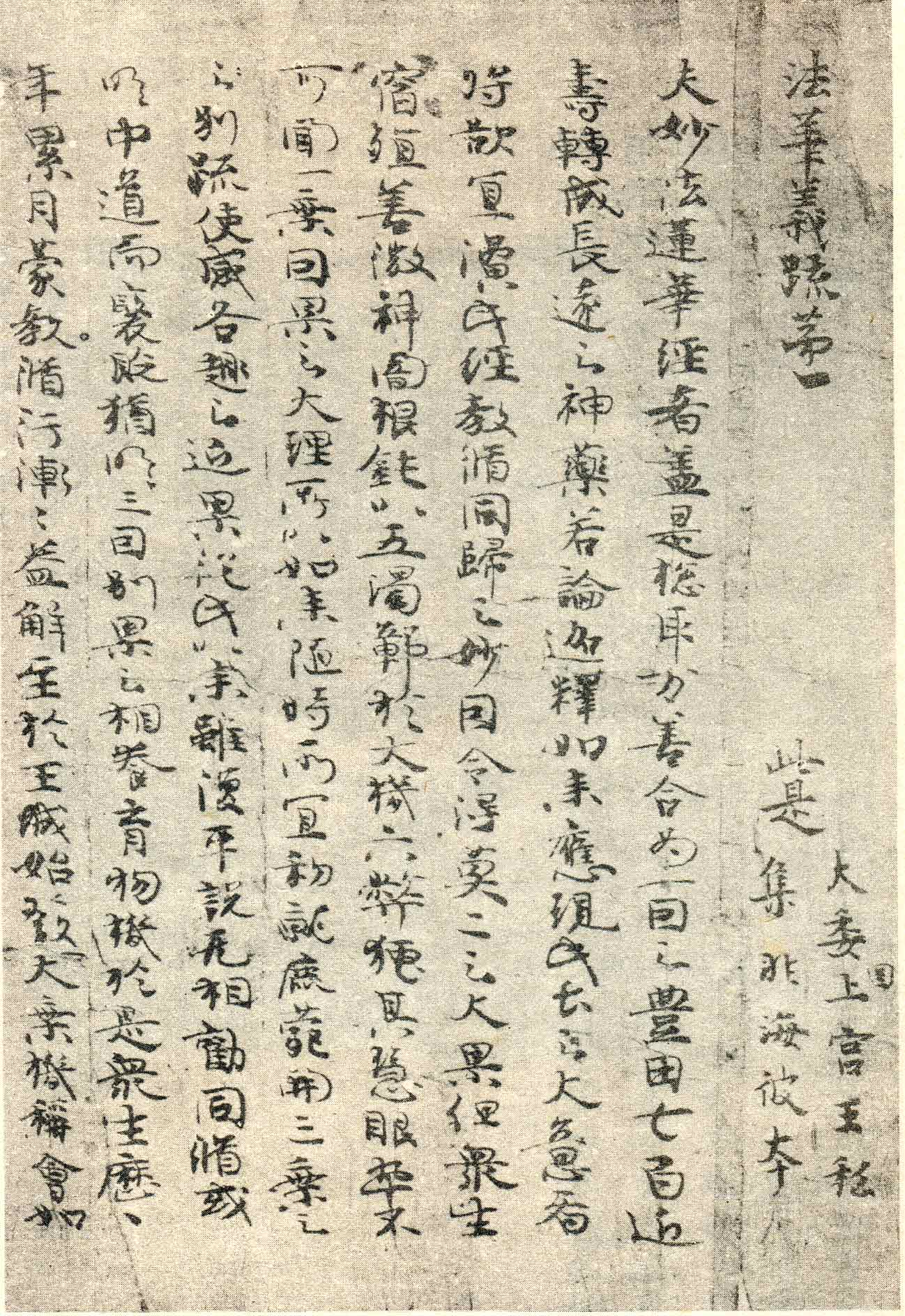
Section of the Commentary on Lotus Sutra, said to be written in Shōtoku's hand

A legend claims that when Bodhidharma came to Japan, he met with Prince Shōtoku whilst under the guise of a starving beggar. The Prince asked the beggar to identify himself, but the man did not reply. Instead of going ahead, Shōtoku gave him food, drink, and covered him with his purple garment, telling him to "lie in peace". Shōtoku then sang for the starving man.

Alas! For
The wayfarer lying
And hungered for rice
On the hill of Kataoka
(The sunshiny)
Art thou become
Parentless?
Hast thou no lord
Flourishing as a bamboo?
Alas! For
The wayfarer lying
And hungered for rice!

The second day, Shōtoku sent a messenger to the starving man, but he was already dead. Hereupon, he was greatly grieved and ordered his burial. Shōtoku later thought the man was no ordinary man for sure, and sending another messenger, discovered the earth had not been disturbed. On opening the tomb there was no body inside, and the Prince's purple garment lay folded on the coffin. The Prince then sent another messenger to claim the garment, and he continued to wear it just as before. Struck by awe, the people praised the Prince: "How true it is that a sage knoweth a sage." This legend is linked with the temple of Daruma-ji in Ōji, Nara, where a stone stupa was found underground, which is exceedingly rare.

== Titles and name ==
Shōtoku is known by several titles, although his real name is Prince Umayado/Umayato (厩戸皇子, Umayado no ōji; literally ‘the prince of the stable door’) since he was born in front of a stable. He is also known as Toyosatomimi (豊聡耳) or Kamitsumiyaō (上宮王). He is also known for bearing the Sanskrit Dharma name Bhavyaśīla which was awarded to him by Bodhidharma. In the Kojiki, his name appears as Kamitsumiya no Umayado/Umayato no Toyosatomimi no Mikoto (上宮之厩戸豊聡耳命). In the Nihon Shoki, in addition to Umayado no ōji, he is referred to as Toyosamimi Shōtoku (豊聡耳聖徳), Toyosatomimi no Nori no Ōkami (豊聡耳法大王), and simply Nori no Ushi no Ōkami (法主王).

The name by which he is best known today, Prince Shōtoku, first appeared in Kaifūsō, compiled in 751, more than 100 years after his death in 622 AD.

== Genealogy ==
Parents

- Father: Emperor Yōmei (用明天皇, 517 – 21 May 587)
- Mother: (Empress) Princess Hashihito no Anahobe (穴穂部間人皇女, d 622)

Wives

- Uji no Kaitako (菟道貝蛸皇女, b.570), daughter of Emperor Bidatsu and Empress Suiko
- Tojiko no Iratsume, daughter of Soga no Umako and Lady Mononobe (刀自古郎女)
  - Son: Prince Yamashiro (山背大兄王; 30 December 643)
  - Daughter: Princess Zai (財王; 30 December 643)
  - Son: Prince Hioki (日置王; 30 December 643)
  - Daughter: Princess Kataoka (片岡女王; 30 December 643)

Concubines

- Tachibana-no-Oiratsume, daughter of Prince Owari (橘大郎女)
  - Son: Prince Shirakabe (白髪部王; d.30 December 643),
  - Daughter: Princess Tejima (手島女王;30 December 643)
- Lady Kashiwade no Iratsume (膳大郎女)
  - Son: Prince Hatsuse (泊瀬王; 30 December 643)
  - Son: Prince Saegusa (三枝王;30 December 643)
  - Son: Prince Tomoshiko (伊止志古王; 30 December 643)
  - Son: Prince Asaryoko (麻呂古王; 30 December 643)
  - Daughter: Princess Tsukishine (舂米女王; 30 December 643) married to Prince Yamashiro
  - Daughter: Princess Kunami (久波太女王; 30 December 643)
  - Daughter: Princess Torybushi (波止利 女王; 30 December 643)
  - Daughter: Princess Umayako (馬屋古女王; 30 December 643)

== Legacy ==
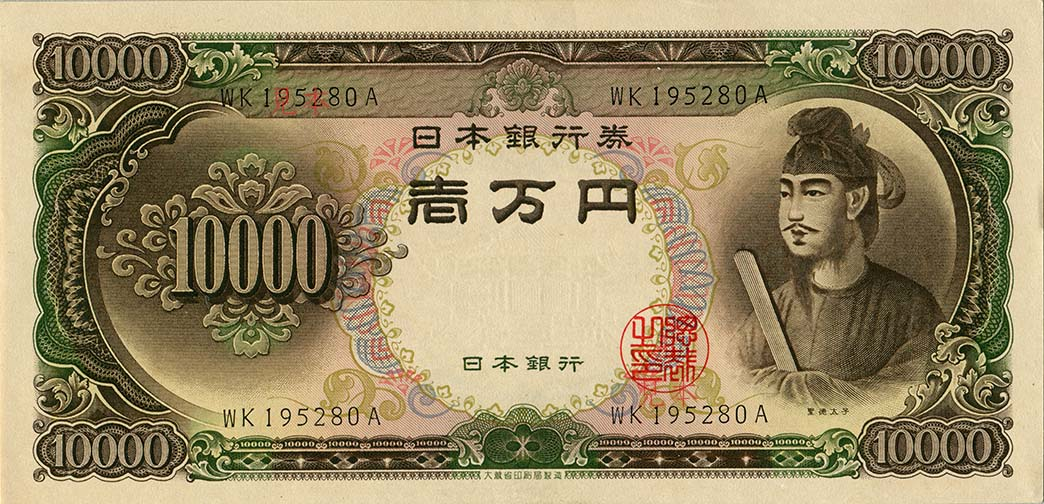
Shōtoku featured on a ¥10,000 banknote, issued in 1958

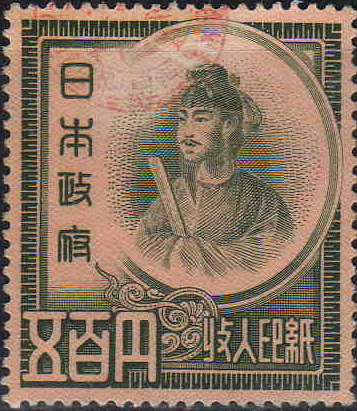
Shōtoku on a 1948 stamp

A number of institutes are named after Shōtoku, such as Shotoku Gakuen University and its associated junior college (both in Gifu). The first syllable of his name (聖), can be read shō in Go-on and can also be read sei in Kan-on. The later reading is found in Seitoku University and its associated junior college (both in Matsudo, Chiba) as well as Tokyo's defunct Seitoku Junior College of Nutrition (and indirectly its replacement Seiei College).

=== Currency ===
The portrait of Prince Shōtoku has appeared on 100, 1,000, 5,000 and 10,000 yen bills. Two bills made with different types of materials and special inks with a face value of 100,000,000 (one hundred million yen) were also issued. The characteristic of these bills is that they have a border around it to prevent its alteration. As characteristics, it has a seal and figures in different positions starting from the middle outwards. The measurements of these two issues of bills are 35.3 cm x 16 cm and the other with a small variation of 34.3 by 16.5 cm. These cloth tickets were used for the exchange of important values.

== Gallery ==
=== Painting ===
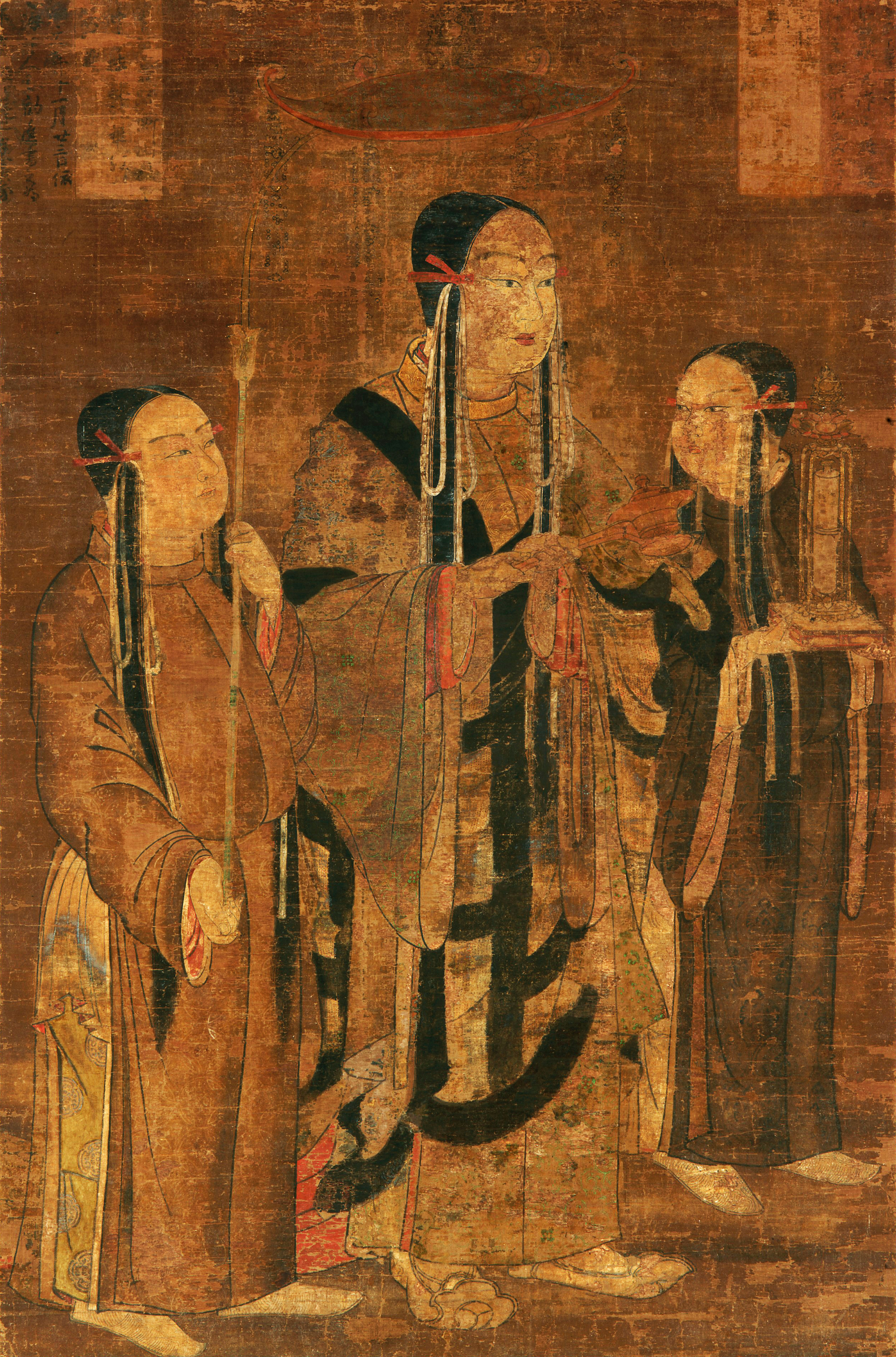
Painting of Prince Shōtoku with two attendants. Colors on silk, Kamakura Period, 13th century

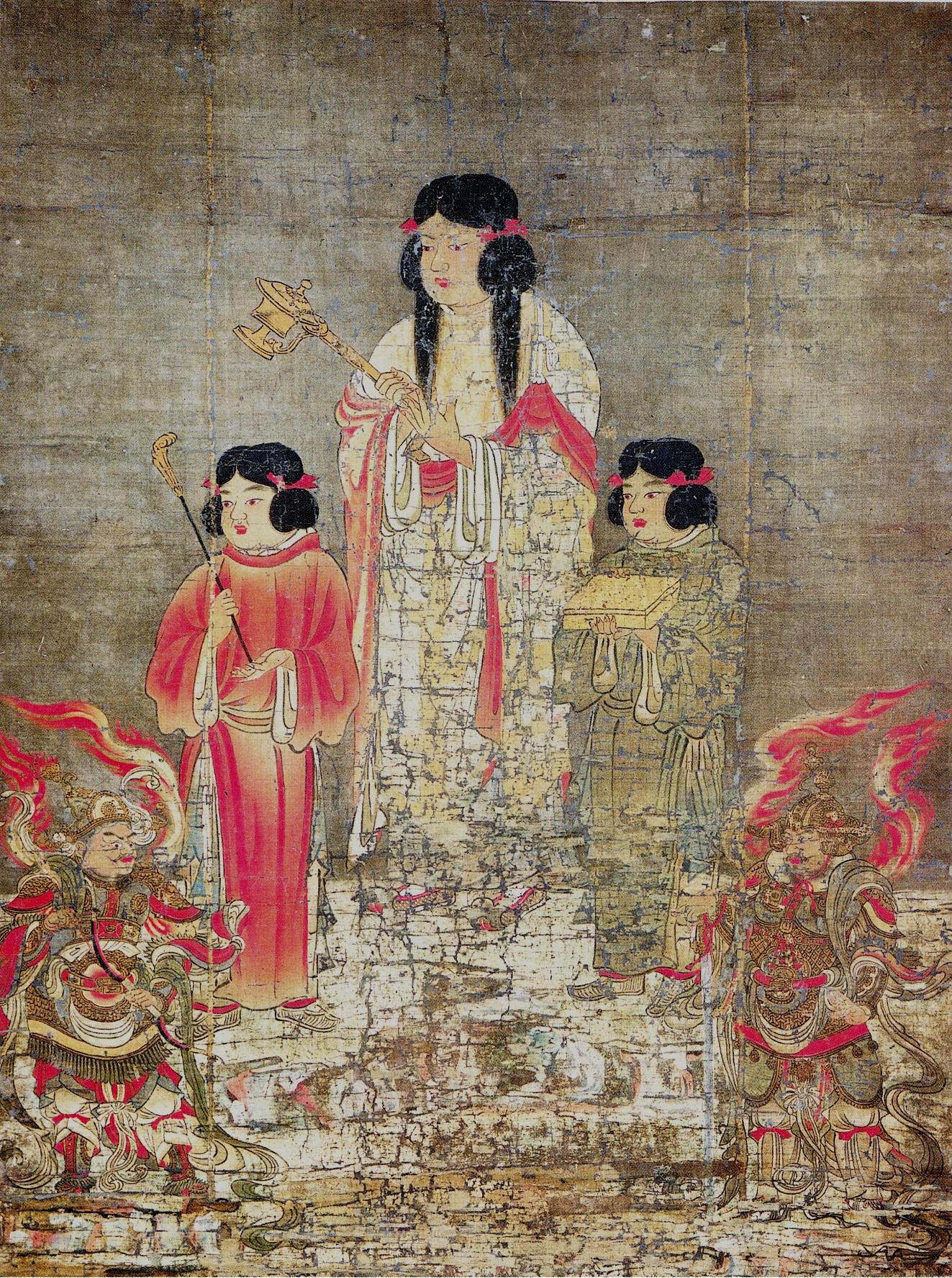
Painting of Shōtoku and two attendants, from Kakurin-ji temple in Kakogawa. Hyōgo Prefecture

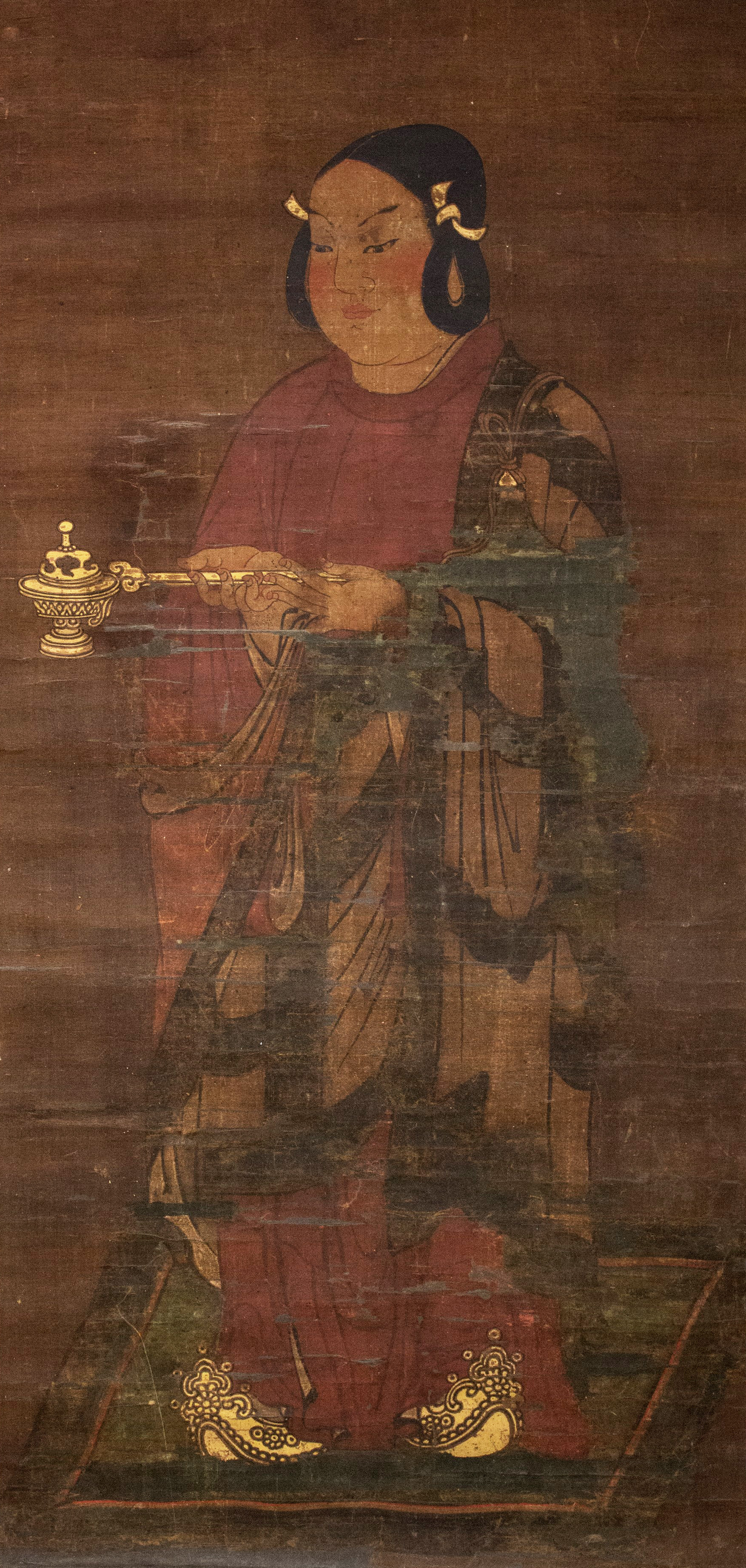
Silk painting of Shōtoku at age sixteen, Nanboku-chō Period, 14th century

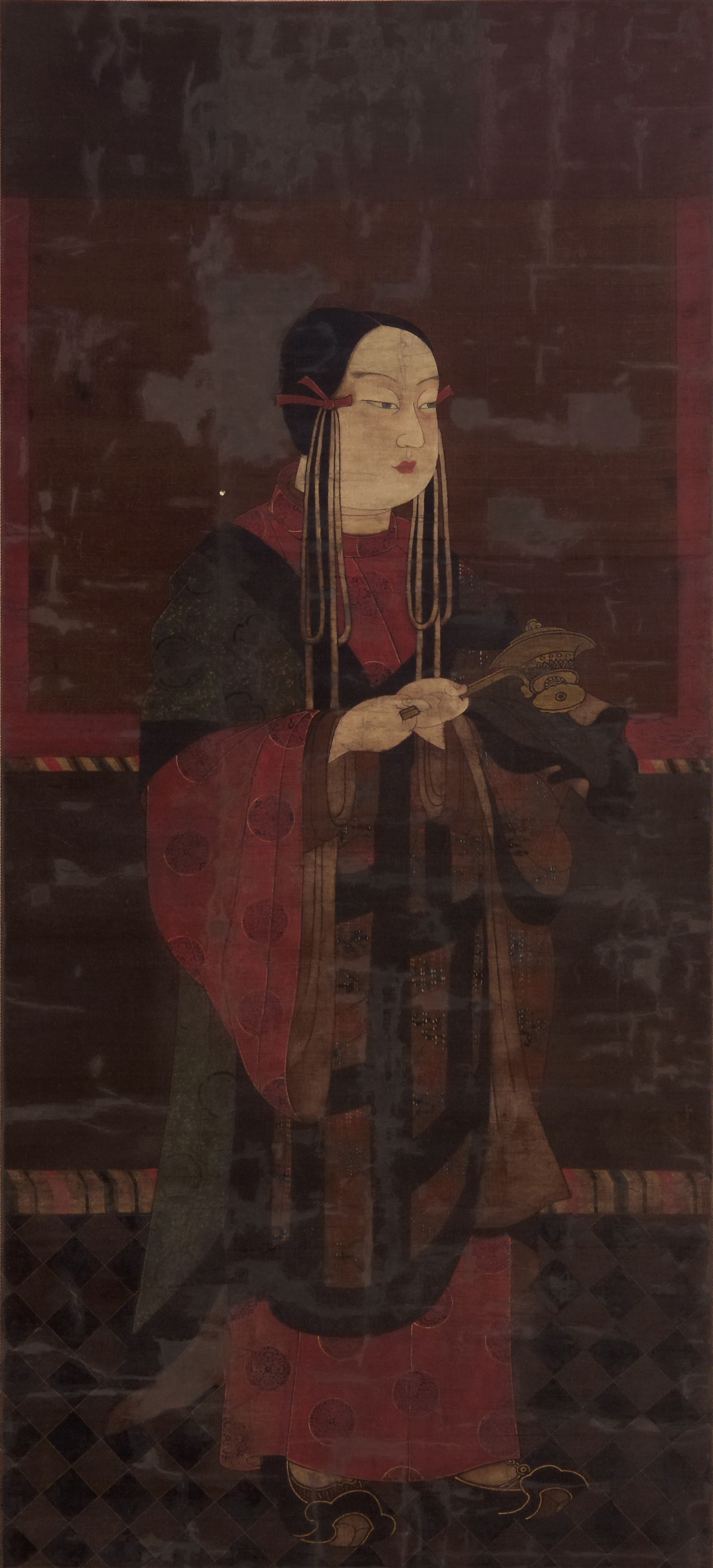
Silk painting of Shōtoku at age sixteen

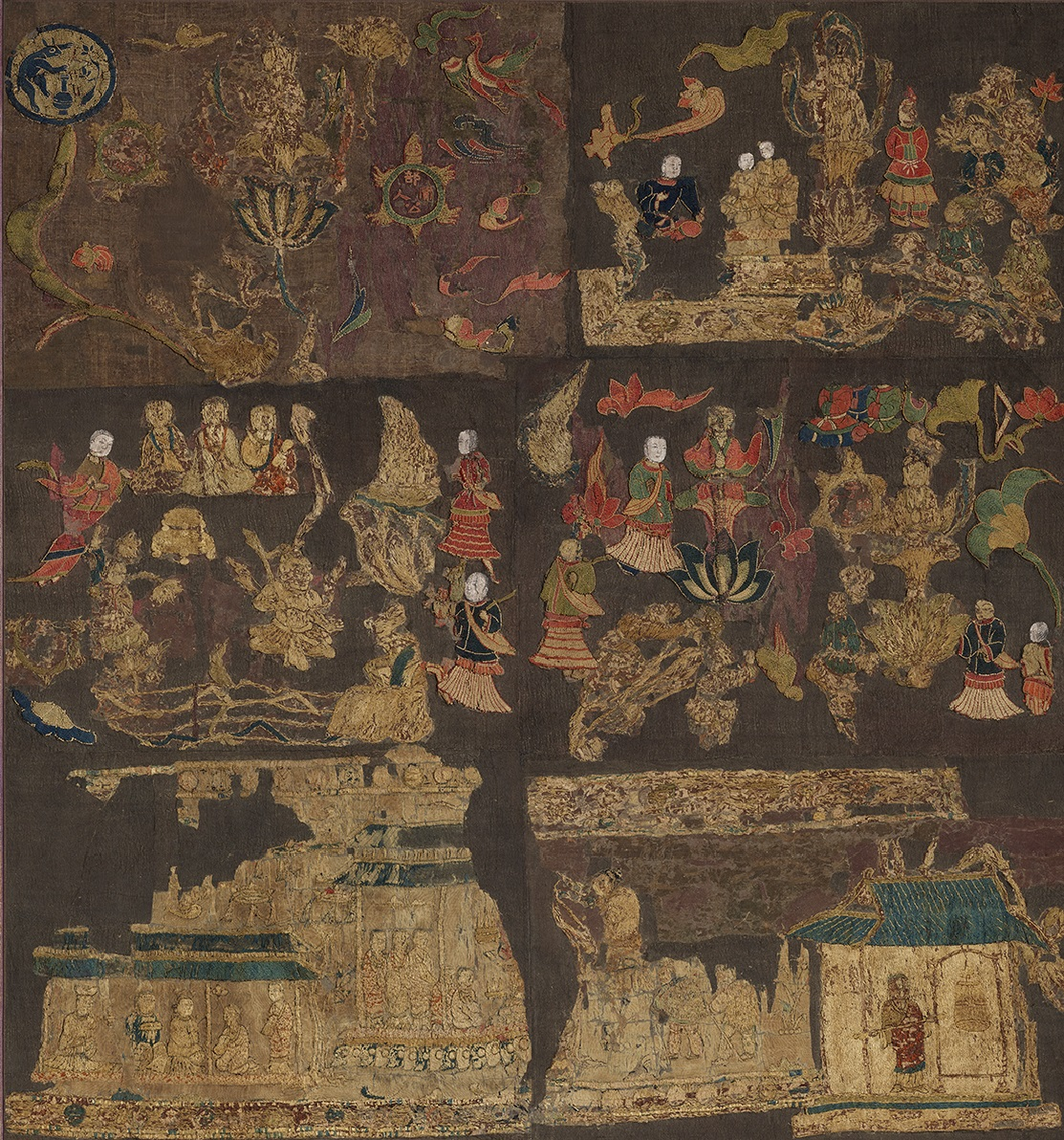
The Tenjukoku Shūchō Mandala, created to commemorate Shōtoku's death (622 CE)

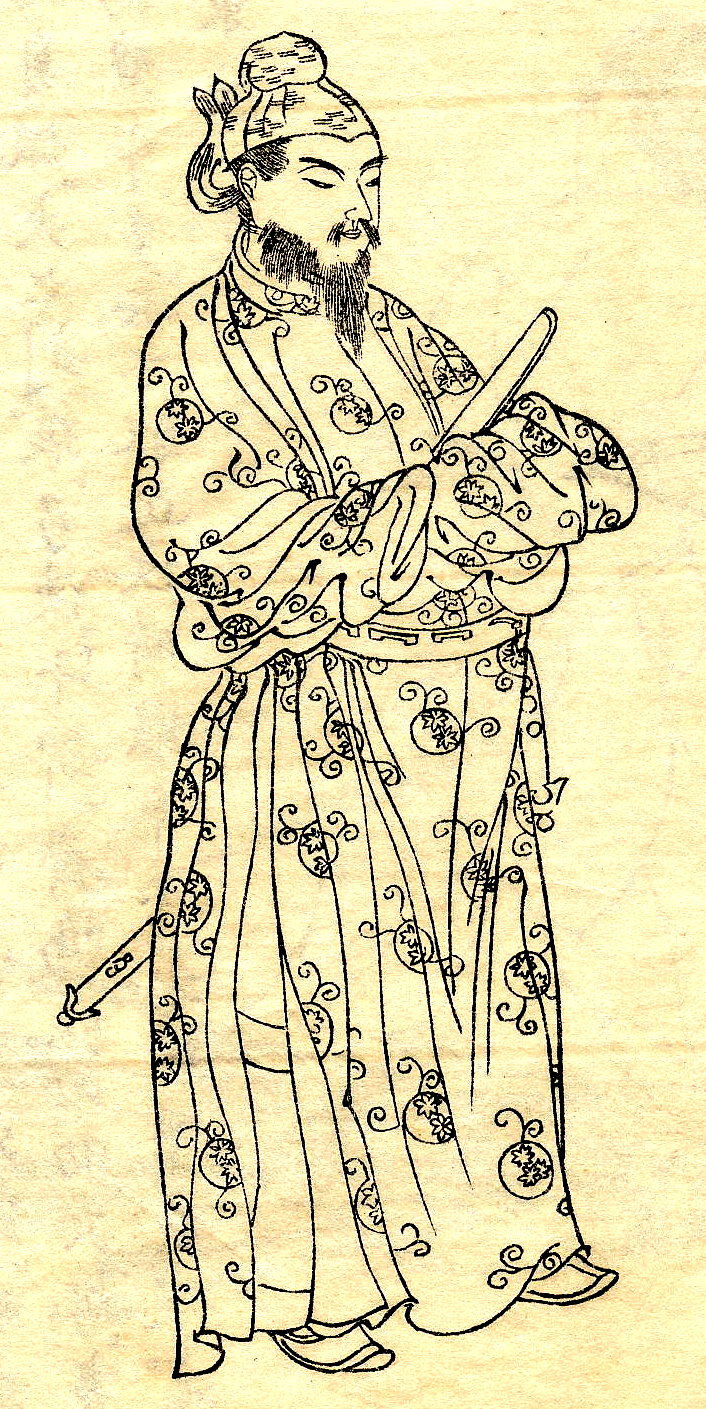
Drawing of Shōtoku by Kikuchi Yōsai (1781–1878)

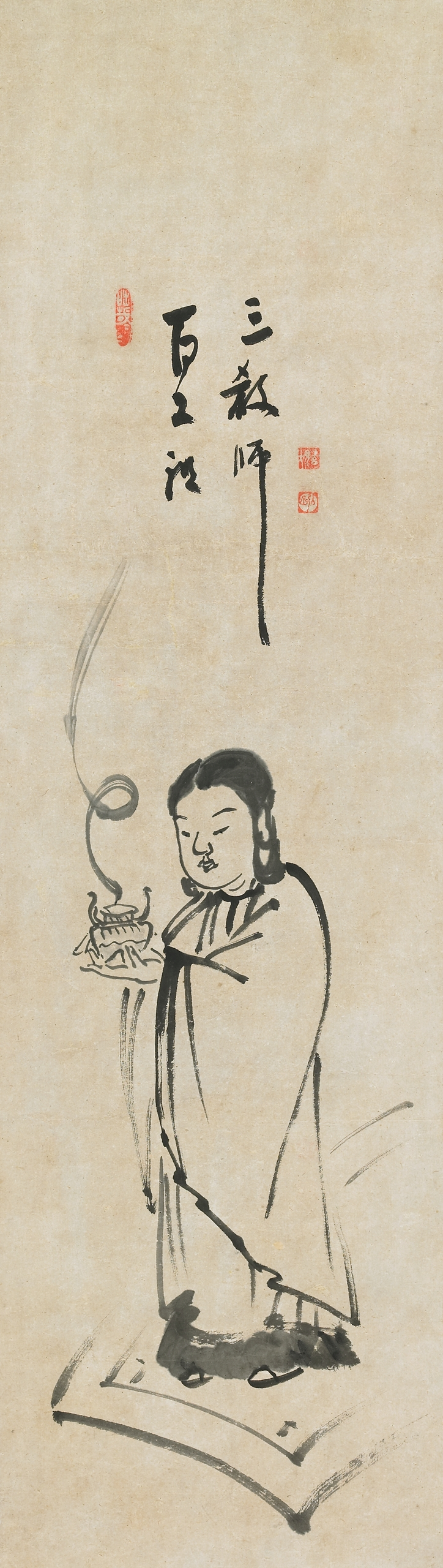
Painting of Shōtoku by Kogan Zenji, 1800

=== Sculpture ===
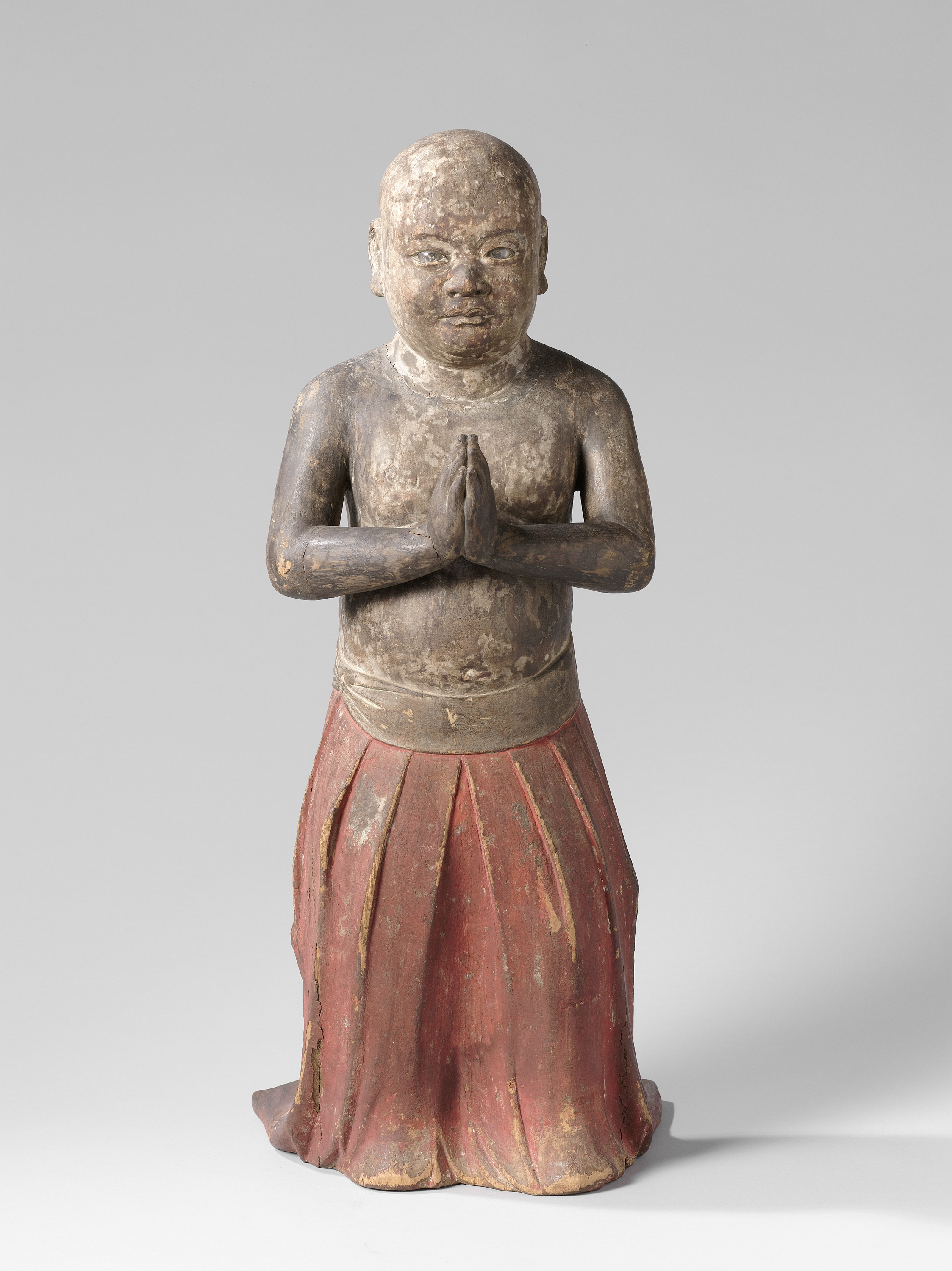
Statue of Shōtoku as a child, with hands pressed together in worship. Circa 1200–1350 CE

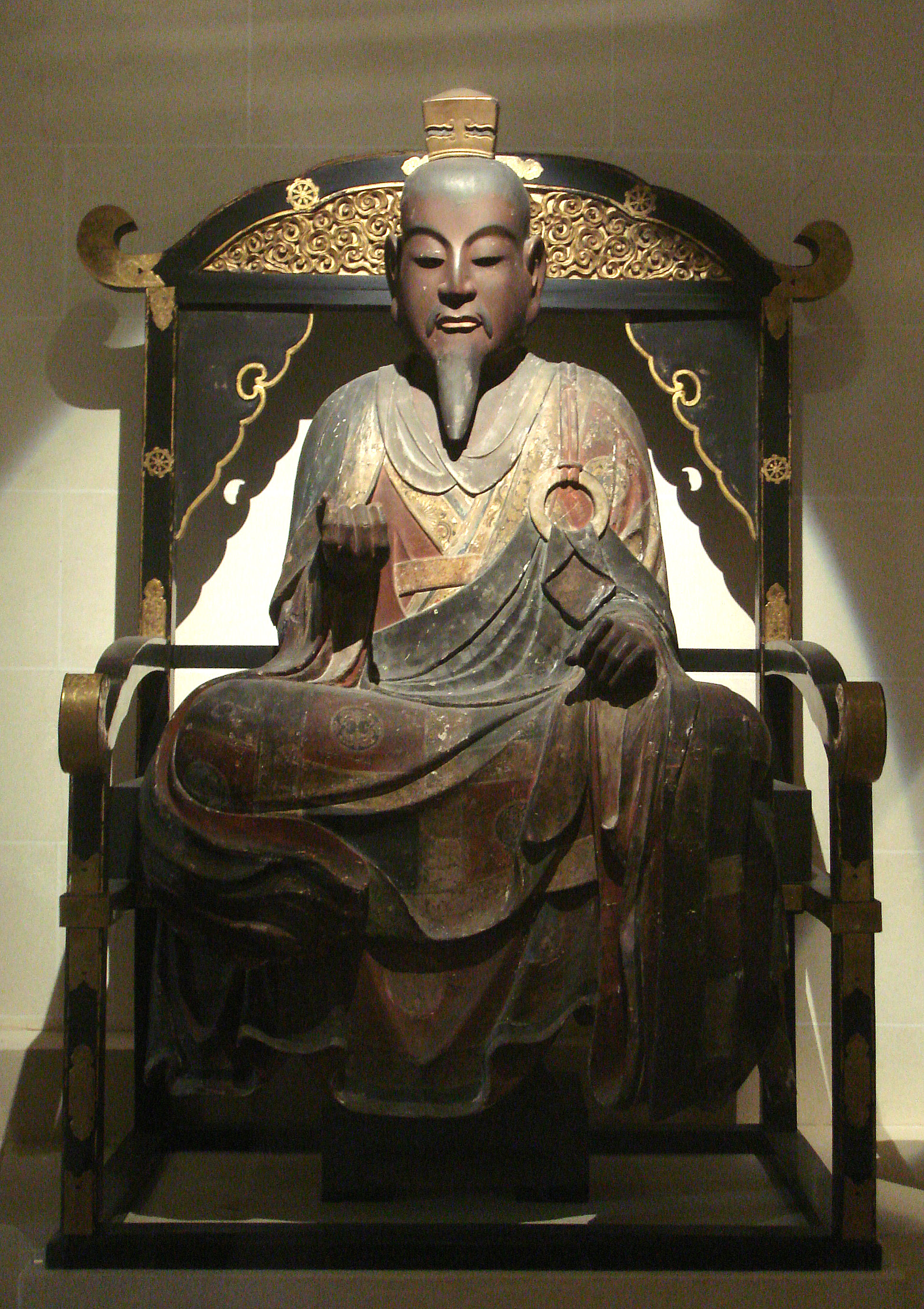
Wooden statue of Prince Shōtoku in the Guimet Museum

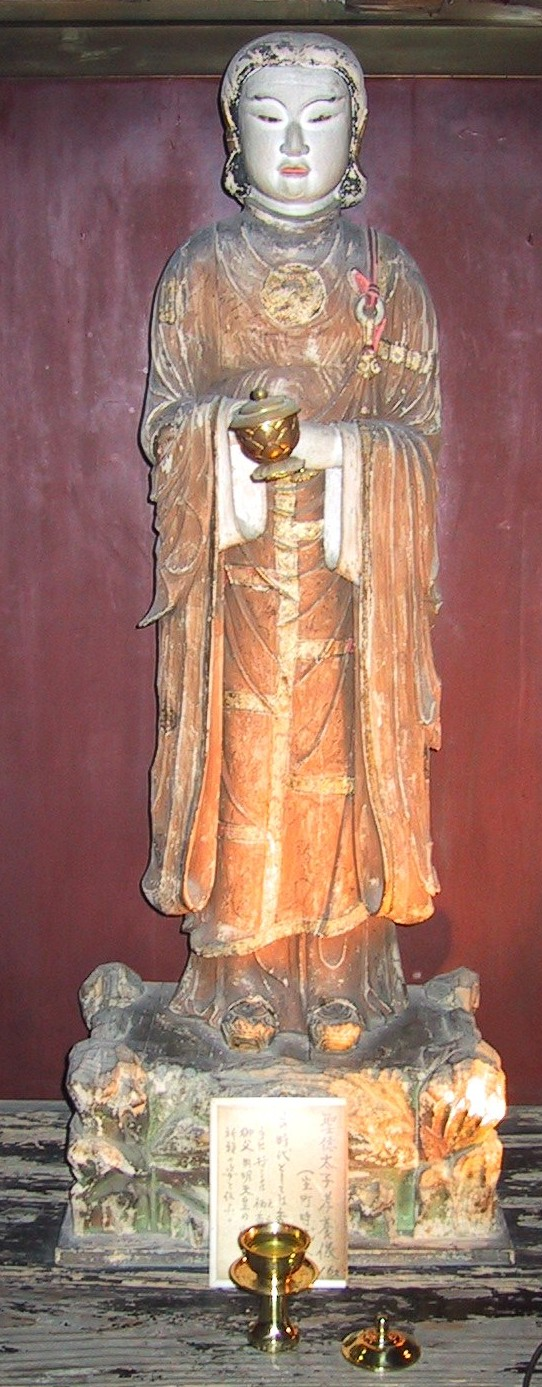
Shōtoku as a bodhisattva at Asuka-dera temple

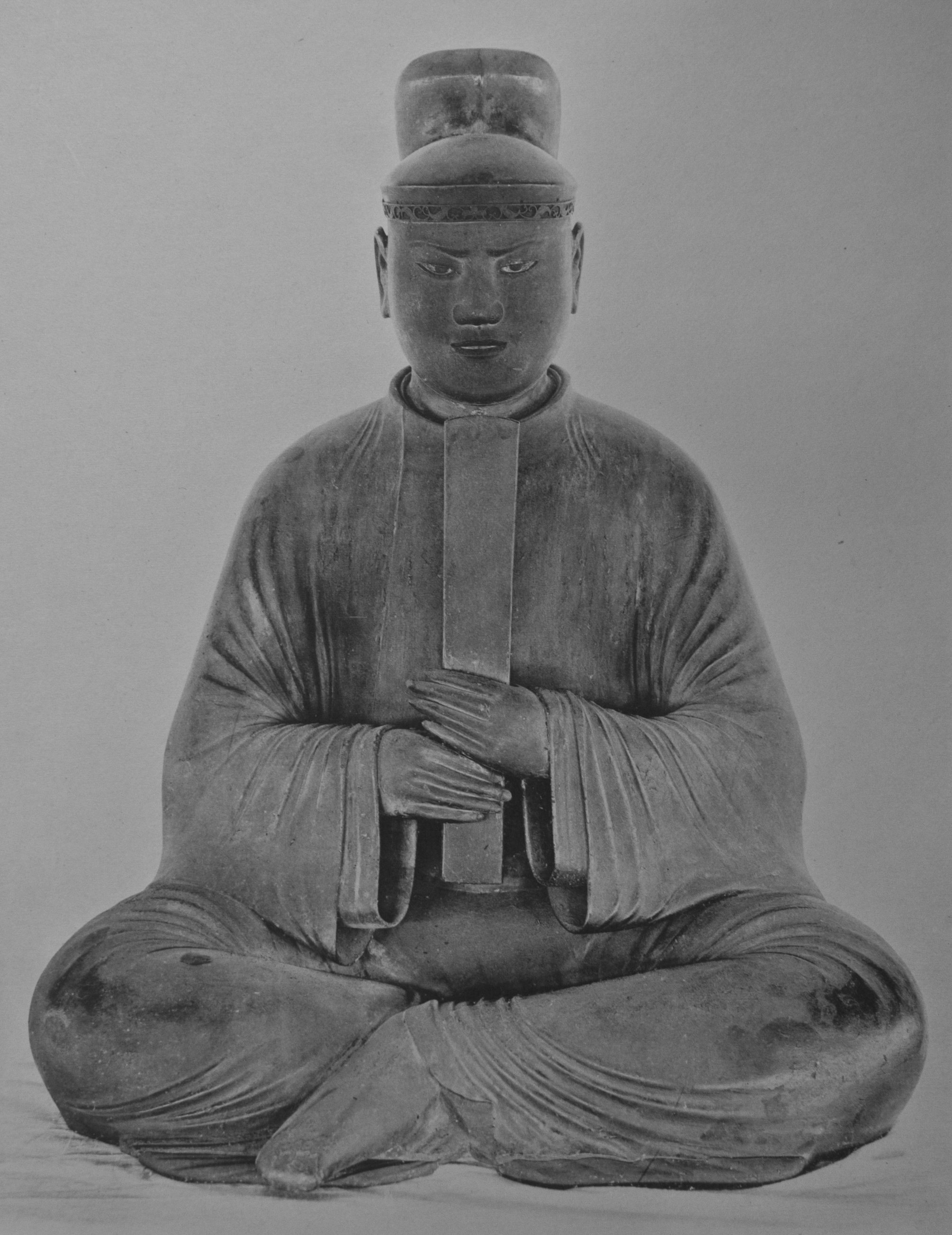
Sculpture of Shōtoku from Hōryū-ji temple

== See also ==
- Asuka-dera
- Jōgū Shōtoku Hōō Teisetsu, biography
- Kokki
- Sangyō Gisho
- Tennōki
- Historical Sites of Prince Shōtoku

== Bibliography ==
- Pradel, Chari (2008). Shoko Mandara and the Cult of Prince Shotoku in the Kamakura Period, Artibus Asiae 68 (2), 215–46
