= Proterra =

Proterra may refer to:

- Proterra (earthen architecture project), a project partner of the UNESCO World Heritage Earthen Architecture Programme
- Proterra (Brazil), Brazilian government rural poverty and land redistribution initiative of the 1970s
- Proterra, Inc., a company that made electric vehicles
- Proterra (album), an album by the band Runrig
