= Hōrin-ji (Nara) =

Buddhist temple in Ikaruga, Nara, Japan

- 法輪寺
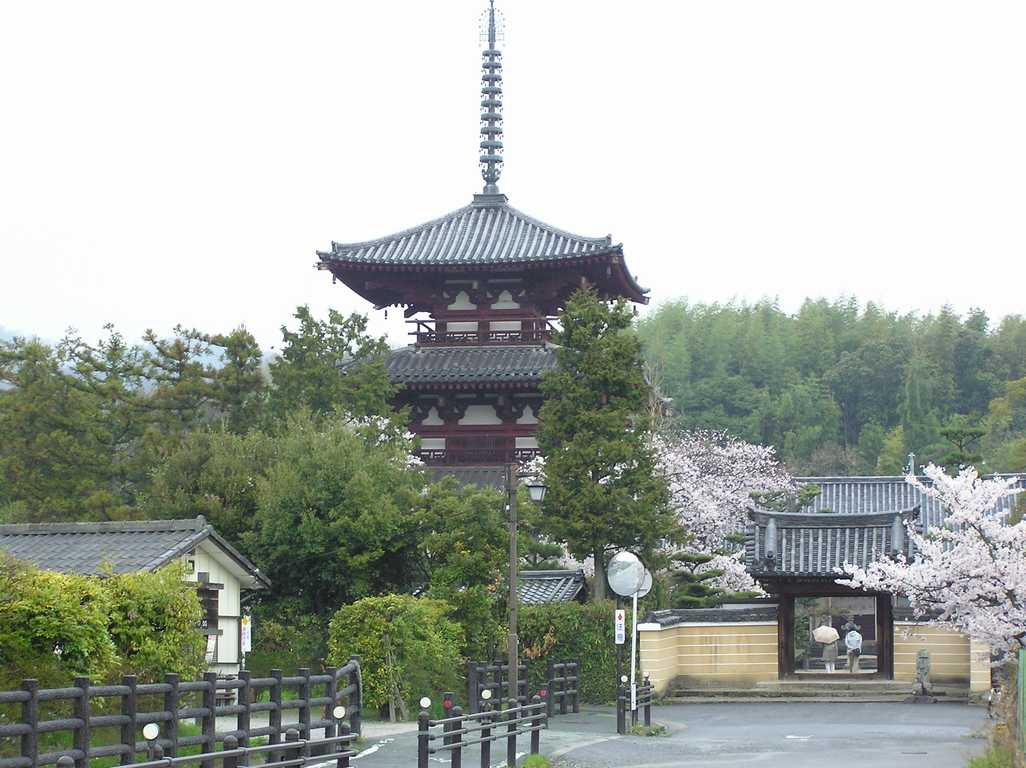
- The three-storied pagoda (1975) of Hōrin-ji

- Location within Nara Prefecture Location within Japan

Religion
- Affiliation: Buddhist
- Deity: Yakushi Nyorai
- Rite: Shōtoku-shū
- Status: functional

Location
- Location: 1570 Mii, Ikaruga-chō, Ikoma-gun, Nara-ken
- Country: Japan
- Interactive map of Hōrin-ji
- Coordinates: 34°37′21.00″N 135°44′19.87″E

Architecture
- Founder: c.Prince Yamashiro no Oe
- Completed: c.622 or 670

Website
- Official website}
- National Historic Site of Japan }

Hōrin-ji (法輪寺, 法琳寺, 法林寺), or Mii-dera (三井寺, 御井寺), is a Buddhist temple located in the Mii neighborhood of the town of Ikaruga, Nara, Japan. It belongs to the Shōtoku-shū sect and its honzon is a statue of Yakushi Nyorai. The temple's full name is Myōken-san Hōrin-ji (妙見山 法輪寺). It is located about a kilometer north of the East Precinct of Hōryū-ji. The existing three-story pagoda was rebuilt in 1975, so it is not included in the World Heritage Buddhist Monuments in the Hōryū-ji Area.

== History ==
The foundation of this temple is uncertain, as there are no records in the Nihon Shoki or Hōryū-ji Garan Engi and Ruki Shizaichō. There are two prevalent theories about the founding of the temple. One theory is found in the "Prince Shotoku's Private Records" (1238, written by Kenshin), which says that Prince Yamashiro no Oe, the son of Prince Shōtoku, built the temple in 622 (the 30th year of the reign of Empress Suiko) to pray for the prince's recovery from illness. The other theory, which appears in the "Jōgū Shōtoku Taishi Denbōketsuki" (written in the early Heian period) and "Shōtoku Taishi Denryaku" (917, written by Fujiwara no Kanesuke), is that it was built by three men from Baekje, but the biographies of each men are unknown.

Archaeological excavations unearthed roof tiles similar to those of the rebuilt Hōryū-ji (currently standing) and roof tiles one level older than that. Post holes and ditches thought to be the remains of a predecessor building were also found, and it is believed that the original construction dates back to the end of the Asuka period, in the mid-7th century. The principal image, a statue of Yakushi Nyorai and a statue of Kokūzō Bosatsu, are also ancient statues dating back to the end of the Asuka period.

In 1367, the temple was destroyed by a fire. After this, the temple's popularity declined, and by the Edo period, the only notable building left was the three-story pagoda. The temple was again destroyed in 1645 by a typhoon, again except for the three-story pagoda. During the Kyōhō era, the temple became a center of the Myōken, worshipping the North Star. In 1760, the three-story pagoda was restored, followed by the Golden Hall, Lecture Hall, and South Gate in 1761. In 1903, the three-story pagoda, which had been designated a National Treasure, was dismantled and repaired. However, on July 21, 1944, it was struck by lightning and burned down, as the lightning rod had been removed under the metal collection order issued during the Pacific War. In 1975, the three-story pagoda was rebuilt, and holds the original reliquary that was saved from the fire in 1944.

=== National Important Cultural Properties ===
- Wooden Yakushi Nyōrai seated statue (木造薬師如来坐像), late Asuka period. Formerly the principal image of the Kondō, it is currently housed in the storage facility. Carved from a single piece of camphor wood, the statue is seated in a cross-legged position on a skirted seat, making the abhaya mudra (right hand raised with palm facing forward, left hand placed palm up on the lap). The statue has a height 110.2-cm. The main part of the head and body are carved from a single piece of wood, but the right side of the body and both legs are made from a different piece of wood, and there are also other irregular joints. Most of the paint has peeled off, revealing the bare wood. The base is made from hinoki cypress, and the halo was added later. It has some similarities to the Shaka Nyorai statue in the Golden Hall of Hōryū-ji (made in 623), such as the shape of the entire statue, including the skirt seat, which fits into an isosceles triangle, the style of clothing, the long face, the lack of a waistline, and the long neck. This statue is estimated to have been made in the late Asuka period (around the second half of the 7th century), slightly later than the Hōryū-ji Shaka statue.
- Wooden Kokūzō Bosatsu standing statue (木造虚空蔵菩薩立像), late Asuka period. Formerly located in the Kondo, it is currently housed in the storage facility. Made from a single piece of camphor wood, it is 175.4-cm high. It stands upright, with its right arm extended forward with its forearm (from the elbow) facing forward and its palm facing up. Its left arm hangs down with its palm facing backward and is holding a water pitcher. The main part of the head and body, as well as the lotus flesh and tenon at the feet, are cut from a single piece of wood. Although the statue is not hollowed out, there is a cavity inside, which suggests that decayed wood was used from the beginning. Most of the paint has peeled off, revealing the bare wood. The wrists, topknot, and the robe hanging down from the left arm are later additions. It is called "Kokūzō Bosatsu," but this is presumably due to a later belief that Prince Shōtoku was an incarnation of Kokūzō Bosatsu, but the original name of the statue is unknown. The Kannon Bosatsu statue at Hōryū-ji, commonly known as "Kudara Kannon", was called "Kokūzō Bosatsu" until the Meiji period, and it is possible that this statue was originally carved as a Kannon Bosatsu. It is estimated that this statue was made in the late Asuka period, slightly later than the Kudara Kannon statue.
- Wooden Miroku Bosatsu standing statue (木造弥勒菩薩立像), Heian period.
- Wooden Jizo Bosatsu standing statue (木造地蔵菩薩立像), Heian period.
- Wooden Kisshoten standing statue (木造吉祥天立像), Heian period.
- Wooden Juichimen Kannon standing statue (木造十一面観音菩薩立像), Heian period. Main image of the Lecture Hall, this statue is 3.5 meters tall.
- Pagoda core bronze reliquary (大和法輪寺塔心礎納置銅壺), Asuka period.
- Tahoto Bunkei (多宝塔文磬), Heian period.
- Rush mat (龍鬢褥), Asuka period.
- Shibi Roof Tile fragments (鴟尾残闕), Asuka period.

== Gallery ==
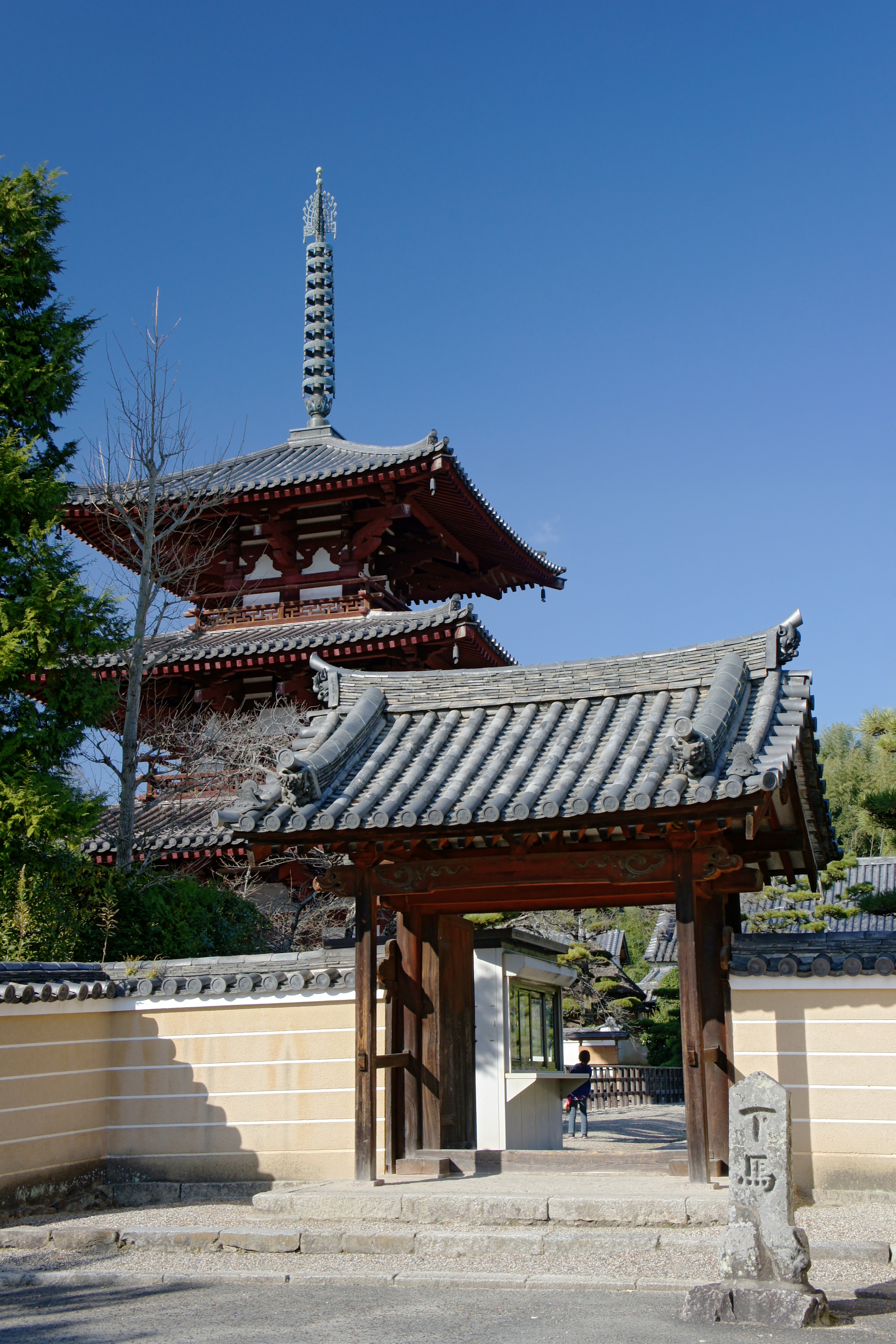
The Minamimon gate

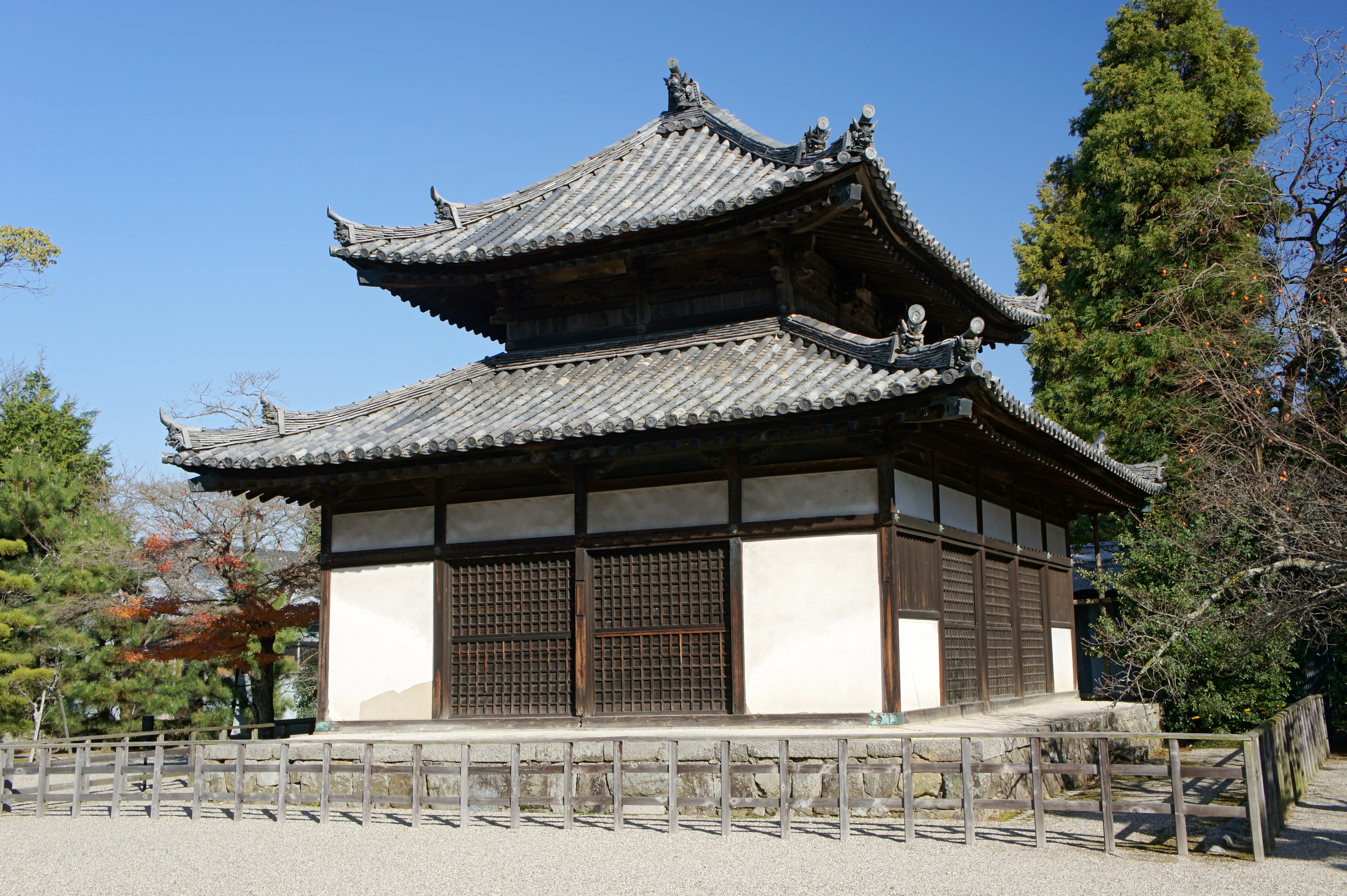
The Kondō (main hall)

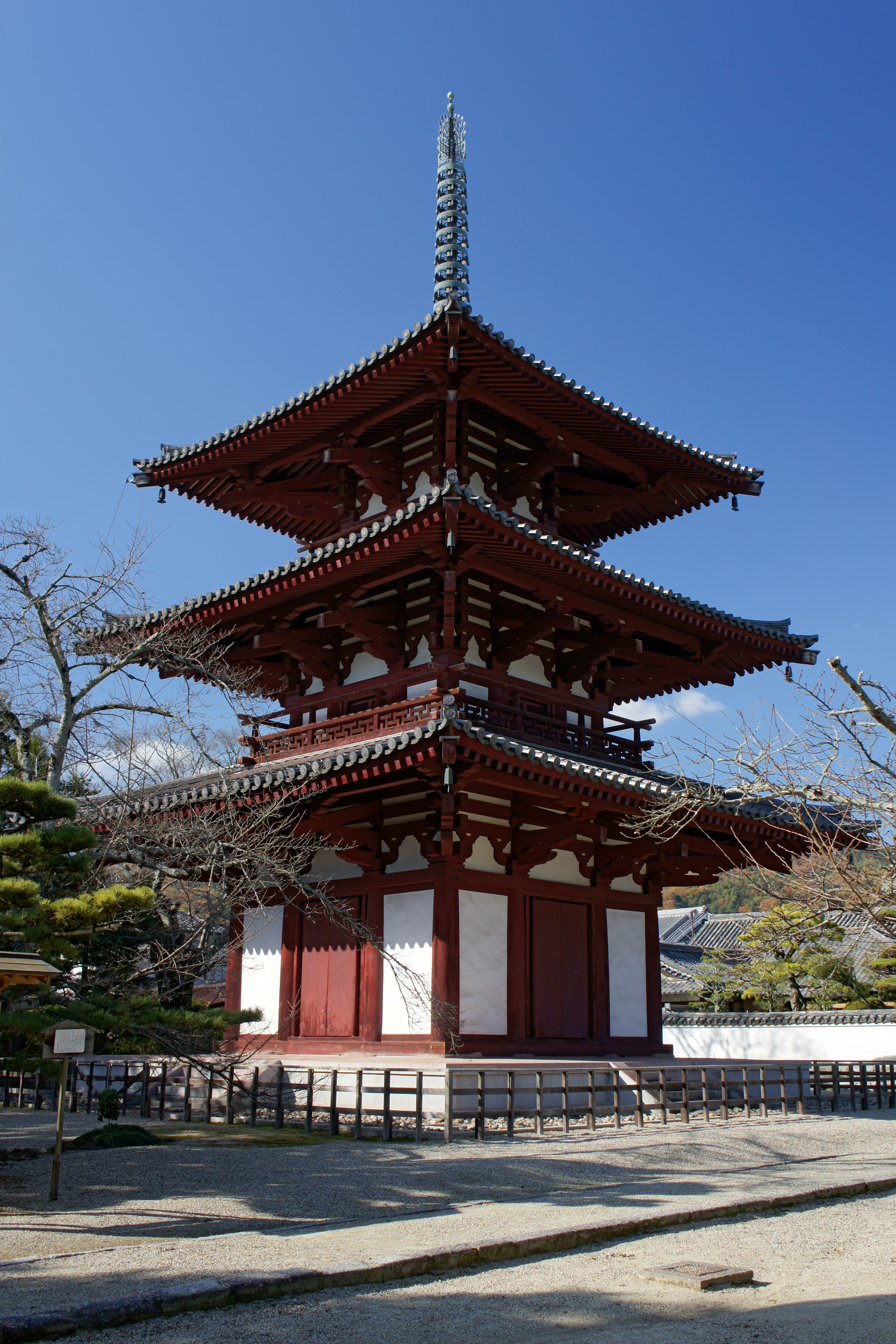
The 3-story pagoda

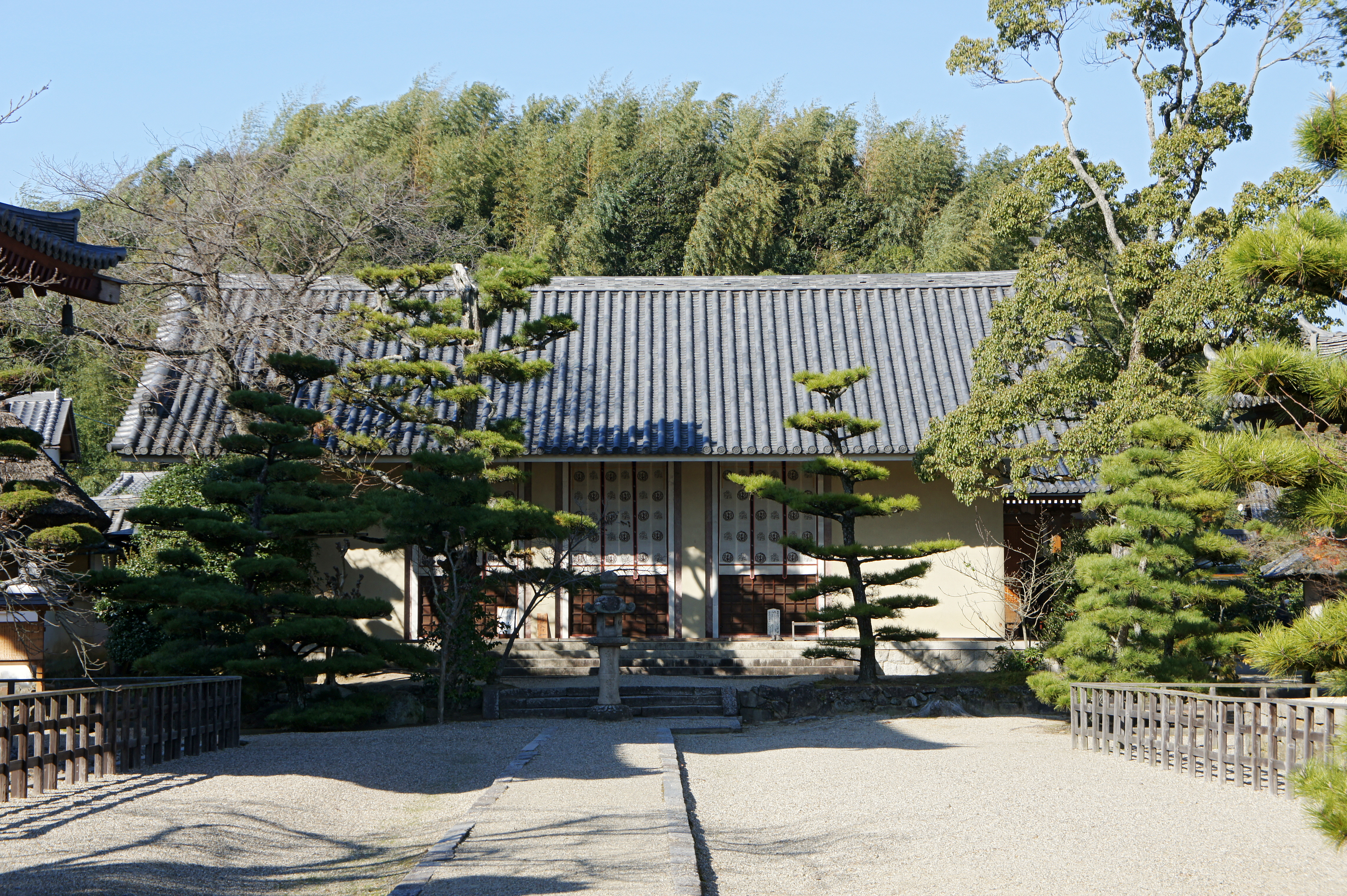
The lecture hall (講堂, Kōdō)

== Mii ==
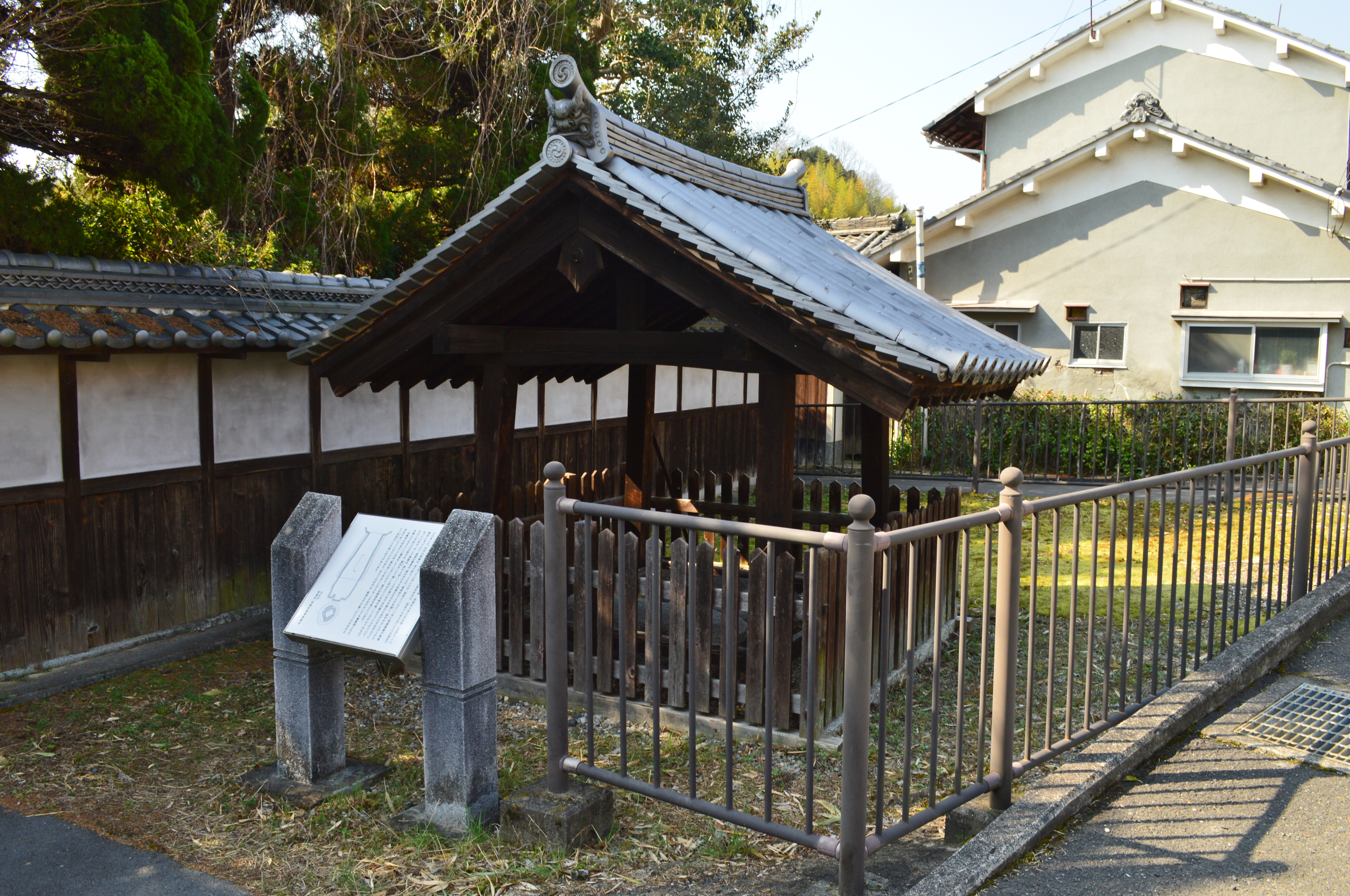
Mii

The original name of the temple, Mii-dera (三井寺), comes from a well said to have been excavated by Prince Shōtoku. Documents from the Muromachi and Edo periods indicate that there were three wells, but the locations of the other two are now unknown. The surviving well, which was designated a National Historic Site in 1944, was filled in at the beginning of the Meiji period and remained buried until it was excavated in 1932. The well is about 4.2 meters deep, 0.97 meters in diameter at the top, and is circular with a bulge in the middle. The bottom of the well is dug about 20-centimeters deeper in the center, and four stones are arranged to form a pit, and the bottom 1.15 meters is made of stonework, and the top three meters is made of brickwork, giving it a unique structure. The bricks are fan-shaped, 25-cm long, 23-cm wide on the inside wall of the well, and 29-cm wide on the back, and 7.6-cm thick; there are no other known examples of this type of brick being used in large quantities. The well is located approximately 500 meters northwest from the temple, on what was once part of the temple precincts.

== Mii Tile Kiln Site ==
The remains of a kiln for firing roof tiles is located on the western slope of a low hill called Kawarazuka, between Hōrin-ji and Hokki-ji. The remains were discovered in 1931 along with old tiles during the reclamation of an orchard, and archaeological excavation revealed that they were the "Tile Mound" mentioned in ancient records. The following year, in 1932, the ruins were designated a National Historic Site as the Mii Tile Kiln Site (三井瓦窯跡, Mii kawara kama ato). The kiln was an underground noborigama-style climbing kiln with its opening facing southwest, a semicircular combustion area, and a firing floor with a slope of about 40 degrees and more than 10 steps. The horizontal distance from the fire opening to the top of the existing firing area was about 4.9 meters, of which about 3.8-meters remains. The side walls of the ceiling rise up in an arch shape, and it is believed that the fire opening was also arched. The excavated items were fragments of flat and round roof tiles, with the round eaves tiles having charcoal and burnt soil mixed in, and it is speculated that the tiles were supplied to Hōryū-ji and Hōrin-ji between the end of the 7th century and the beginning of the 8th century.

== See also ==
- List of Historic Sites of Japan (Nara)
