= Eloundou =

Eloundou or Éloundou is a surname found in Cameroon. Notable people with this surname include:

- Charles Eloundou (born 1994), a Cameroonian football player
- Emmanuel Eloundou (born 1948), a Cameroonian boxer
- Lazare Eloundou Assomo (fl. 1996 – present), a Cameroonian architect
- Sylvie Mballa Éloundou (born 1977), a French-Cameroonian sprinter
- Denise Eloundou (born 1972), a Liberian-Cameroonian finance professional
