= Lazare Eloundou Assomo =

Cameroonian architect and heritage advisor (born 1968)

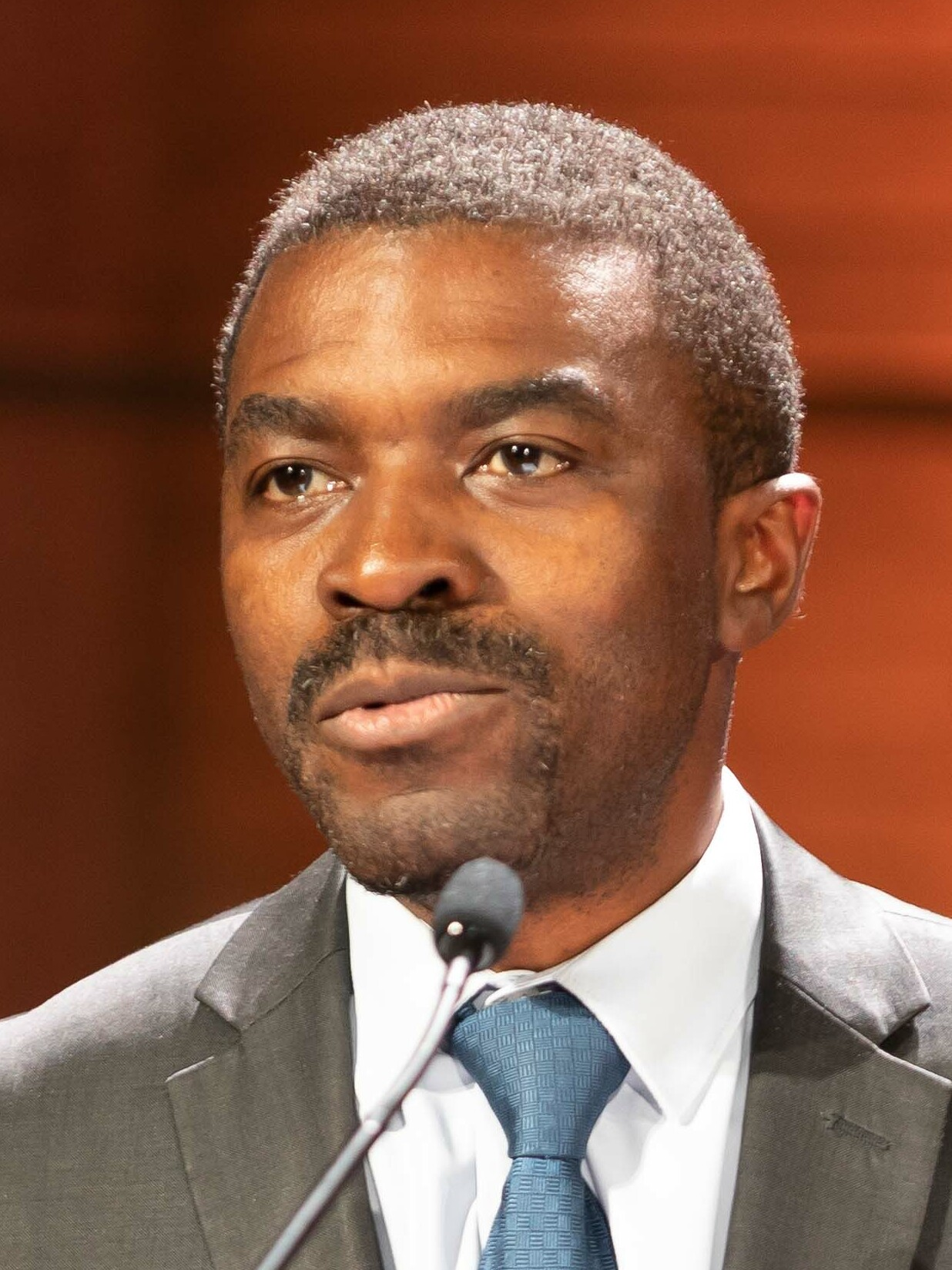
- Assomo in 2019

Director of the World Heritage Centre
- Incumbent
- Assumed office 6 December 2021
- Preceded by: Mechtild Rössler

Personal details
- Born: 1968 (age 57–58) Cameroon
- Occupation: Architect, heritage advisor

Lazare Eloundou Assomo (born 1968) is a Cameroonian architect and heritage advisor. In 2021, he was the first African to be appointed head of UNESCO Headquarters.

== Career ==
Assomo graduated from the Grenoble School of Architecture in 1996 and worked as a researcher there at the Centre for Earthen Construction. Early project he worked on were praised by Nelson Mandela for their community-centred approaches. He joined UNESCO in 2003 and worked on the implementation of the African World Heritage Fund, and the World Heritage Earthen Architecture Program.

From 2008 to 2013, Assomo led the Africa Unit of World Heritage Centre, and from there joined UNESCO's Bamako office, and in 2014 was appointed to lead its Mali office. He worked on the reconstruction of mausoleums in Timbuktu that were destroyed by al-Qaeda. In 2016, he returned to the World Heritage Centre as Deputy Director of the Heritage Division, before being appointed in 2018 Director of Culture and Emergencies.

In December 2021, Assomo was appointed Head of the World Heritage Centre by Audrey Azoulay, replacing Mechtild Rössler. He is the centre's fifth director and the first African to hold the position. He has been outspoken on the subject of the study of "colonial heritage" in Africa.
