= Mechtild Rössler =

German geographer, United Nations diplomat

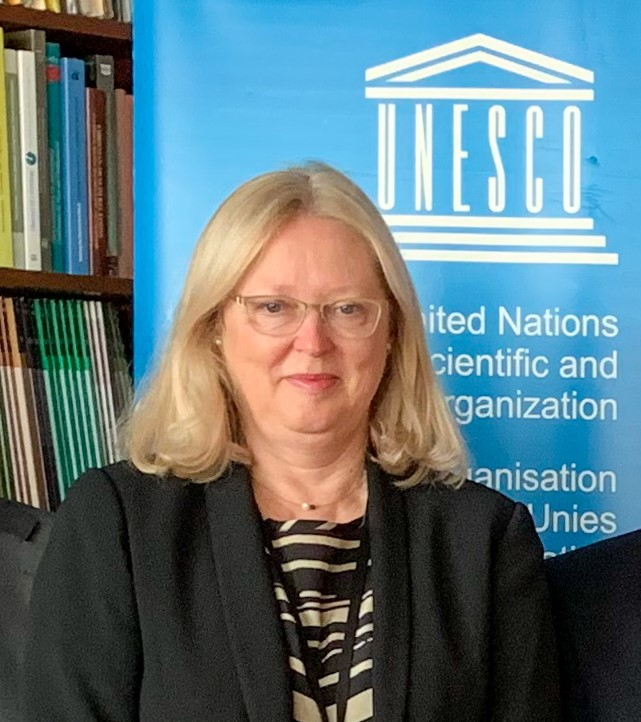

Director of the World Heritage Centre
- In office 2015–2021
- Preceded by: Kishore Rao
- Succeeded by: Lazare Eloundou Assomo

Personal details
- Born: 11 June 1959 (age 67) Germany
- Education: Albert Ludwig University of Freiburg, University of Hamburg

Mechtild Rössler is a German feminist geographer and cultural heritage scholar. From 2015 until her retirement in November 2021 she was Director of the UNESCO World Heritage Center in Paris. She was preceded by Kishore Rao, and was succeeded by Lazare Eloundou Assomo.

== Biography ==
Rössler studied cultural geography at the Albert-Ludwigs-University of Freiburg and was awarded her doctorate in 1988 at the University of Hamburg on the topic "Science and Living Space", Geographical East Research under National Socialism: a contribution to the history of the discipline of geography. Her thesis contributed to discourse on feminist geographies and Nazism. In 1989 she worked for the Research Center of the Cité des sciences et de l'industrie in Paris. This was followed by a research post at the University of California, Berkeley in the Department of Geography.

In 1991 she joined UNESCO, first in its Division for Ecological Science, followed by a move the following year to the World Heritage Centre. Her roles at UNESCO in the years prior to her appointment as Director included: Programme Specialist for Natural Heritage (1993-2001), Chief of Europe and North America (2001-2010), Chief of the Policy and Statutory Meeting Section (2010-2013) and Deputy Director (2013-2014).

Rössler was appointed Director of the Department of Cultural Heritage and World Heritage Center in 2015. She succeeded Kishore Rao. Starting in November 2018, she also managed the World Heritage Convention. She retired in 2021 and was succeeded by Lazare Eloundou Assomo. During her time at UNESCO the World Heritage List expanded to include cultural landscapes.

In 2021 she warned the Government of the United Kingdom that it was not doing enough to protect its World Heritages Sites, such as Stonehenge. In the same year she called on the Government of Hungary to halt a EUR 68 million development on Lake Fertő. In 2016 she had issued a similar warning in the case of Edinburgh's Old and New Towns. She has also encouraged the Government of China to take a role in global leadership on cultural heritage issues.

== Selected publications ==
- Cameron, Christina & Rössler, Mechtild: Many Voices, One Vision: The Early Years of the World Heritage Convention (Routledge, 2016)
- Rössler, Mechtild. "World Heritage cultural landscapes: A UNESCO flagship programme 1992–2006." Landscape Research 31.4 (2006): 333-353.
- Rössler, Mechtild. “World Heritage Cultural Landscapes.” The George Wright Forum, vol. 17, no. 1, 2000, pp. 27–34.
- Rössler, Mechtild. "Die Institutionalisierung einer neuen „Wissenschaft “im Nationalsozialismus: Raumforschung und Raumordnung 1935–1945." Geographische Zeitschrift (1987): 177-194.
