= Proterra (earthen architecture project) =

Organization promoting earthen architecture

Proterra is an Ibero American organization promoting earthen architecture. It was initially founded as a four-year project of CYTED in 2001, but continued to become a UNESCO WHEAP partner in 2012.
