= Hokki-ji =

Buddhist temple in Nara Prefecture, Japan

- 法起寺
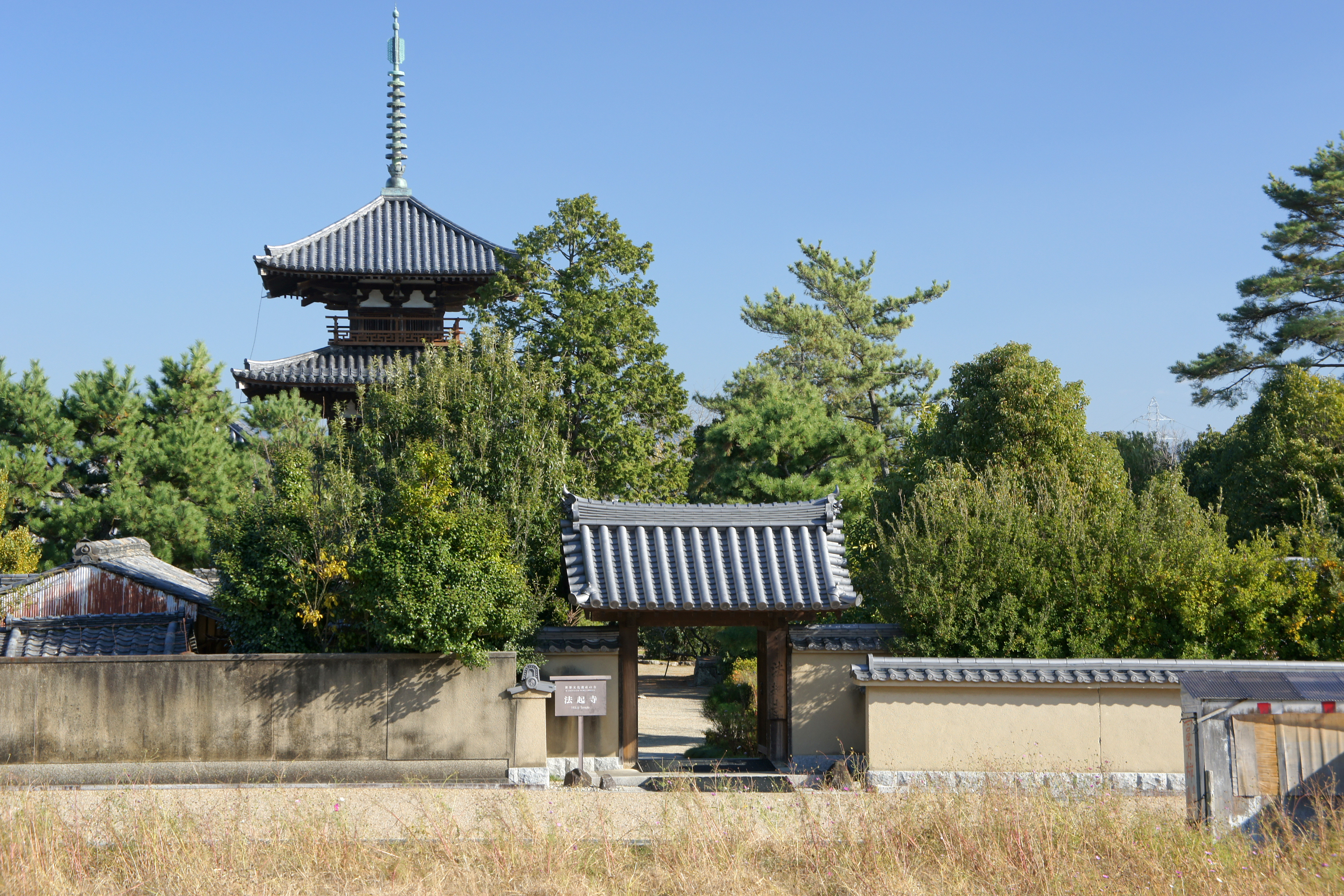
- Hokki-ji

- Location within Nara Prefecture Location within Japan

Religion
- Affiliation: Buddhist
- Deity: Jūichimen Kannon
- Rite: Shōtokū-shu
- Status: functional

Location
- Location: 1873 Okamoto Ikaruga-chō, Ikoma-gun, Nara-ken
- Country: Japan
- Interactive map of Hokki-ji
- Coordinates: 34°37′22.7″N 135°44′46.4″E

Architecture
- Founder: Prince Shōtoku
- Completed: c.638 AD
- UNESCO World Heritage Site
- Type: Cultural
- Criteria: (i), (ii), (iv), (vi)
- Designated: 1993
- Reference no.: 660
- National Treasure of Japan

Website
- Official website
- National Historic Site of Japan

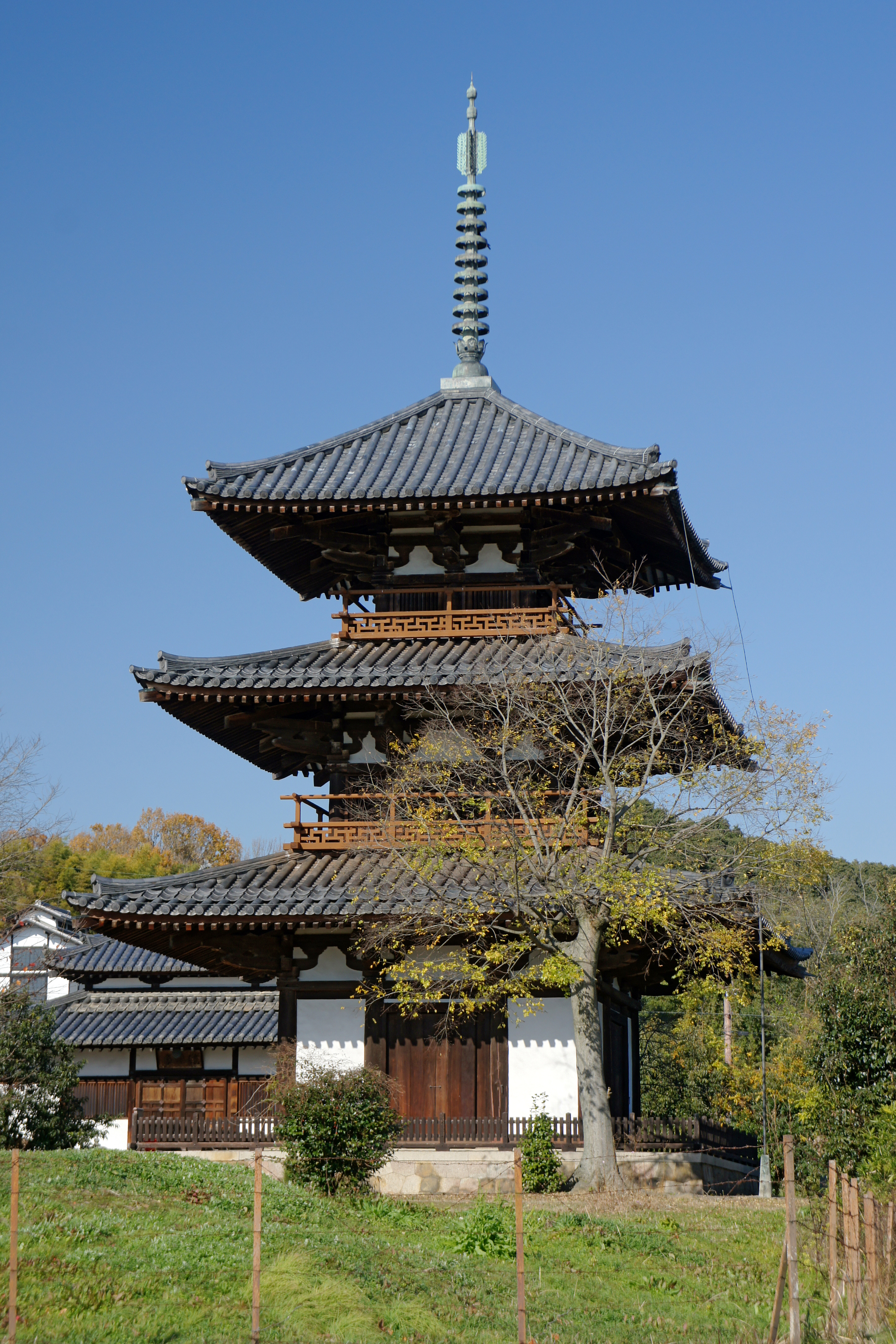
The three-storied pagoda of Hokki-ji, a National Treasure

Hokki-ji or Hōki-ji (法起寺; the ‘temple of the Arising Dharma’) – formerly known as Okamoto-dera (岡本寺) and Ikejiri-dera (池後寺) – is a Buddhist temple temple in the Okamoto neighborhood of the town of Ikaruga, Nara Prefecture, Japan. The temple's honorary sangō prefix is "Kōhonzan" (岡本山), although it is rarely used. The temple was constructed to honor Avalokitesvara, and an 11-faced statue of the goddess is the primary object of worship in the temple. Hokki-ji is often considered to be one of the seven great temples founded by Prince Shōtoku, but in fact the temple was not completed until some decades after his death. In 1993, it was registered together with Hōryū-ji as a UNESCO World Heritage Site under the name Buddhist Monuments in the Hōryū-ji Area.

== History ==
The town of Ikaruga, where the World Heritage Site Hōryū-ji is located, was a center for early Japanese Buddhism, and the temples of Hokki-ji, Hōrin-ji and Chūgū-ji were founded in the 7th century, and claim a connection to Prince Shōtoku. Hokki-ji is located in the Okamoto district at the foot of the mountain northeast of Hōryū-ji's East Precinct. It is said that the temple lies atop the ruins of Okamoto no Miya (岡本宮) palace, wherein Prince Shōtoku had lectured on the Lotus Sutra, and that according to the prince's last will and testament, his son, Prince Yamashiro no Ōe rebuilt the former palace as a temple. Later, during the reign of Emperor Jomei (638), a Miroku Bosatsu statue was installed and a new main hall was completed, and in 706, the present three-story pagoda was completed.

The temple was originally a nunnery, and as early as 747 it was listed in the "Hōryū-ji Engi," by the name "Ikego-niji," as one of the "Seven Temples Built by Prince Shōtoku." The oldest document showing that Ikego-niji and Hokki-ji are the same temple is the Shichidaiki (written by Kyomei, a monk of Shitenno-ji) from 771, which says, "Hokki-ji was called Ikego-ji by people of the time". The temple was also called Okamoto-ji, and the earliest example of this is the "Tōdai-ji Temple Construction Office" (Shōsō-in documents) from 750. The 9th century collection of Buddhist tales, Nihon Ryōiki includes a miraculous tale about the Kannon statue at Okamoto-niji.

Hokki-ji flourished during the Nara period, but fell into decline during the Heian period and was taken over by Hōryū-ji Temple. The three-story pagoda and lecture hall were repaired during the Kamakura period, but it began to decline again during the Muromachi period, and by the Edo period, only the three-story pagoda remained. In 1678, the three-story pagoda was restored, and in 1694, the lecture hall was rebuilt.

Archaeological excavations of the temple grounds conducted after 1960 have uncovered the remains of the foundations of the main hall and lecture hall, as well as the remains of a tiled foundation for the central gate, revealing the original layout of the temple complex at the time of its construction. The former temple complex has the main hall and pagoda lined up on the left and right (east and west), similar to the layout of the western precincts of Hōryū-ji, but the main hall was built on the west and the pagoda on the east, which is the opposite of Hōryū-ji Temple, and this style is called the "Hokki-ji style temple complex layout."

In addition, excavation revealed that the original structures were post-hole buildings (with no foundation stone, but wooden pillars placed in holes dug into the ground) and also a stone-paved rain gutter dating back to before the construction of the original temple complex, confirming the existence of some predecessor building before the founding of Hokki-ji, which is presumed to be Okamoto Palace. The original complex of Hokki-ji was built along a central north-south axis, facing south, but the predecessor building and gutter were built along an axis tilted about 20 degrees west from the north-south axis. The central axis of the building tilted about 20 degrees west is also common to the remains of the Wakakusa temple complex, the predecessor of Hōryū Temple.

The grounds of the temple were designated a National Historic Site in 1993.

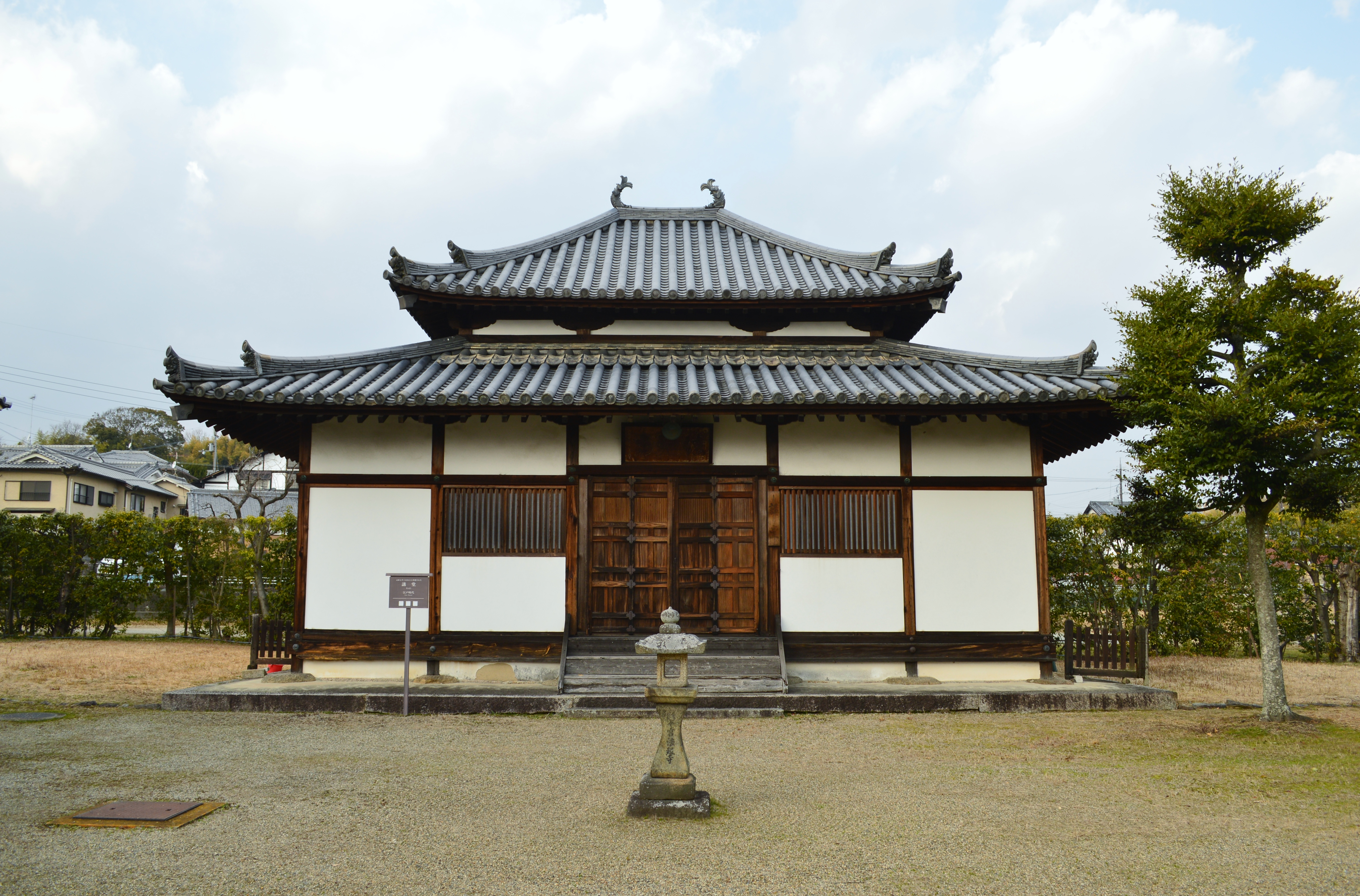
Lecture Hall

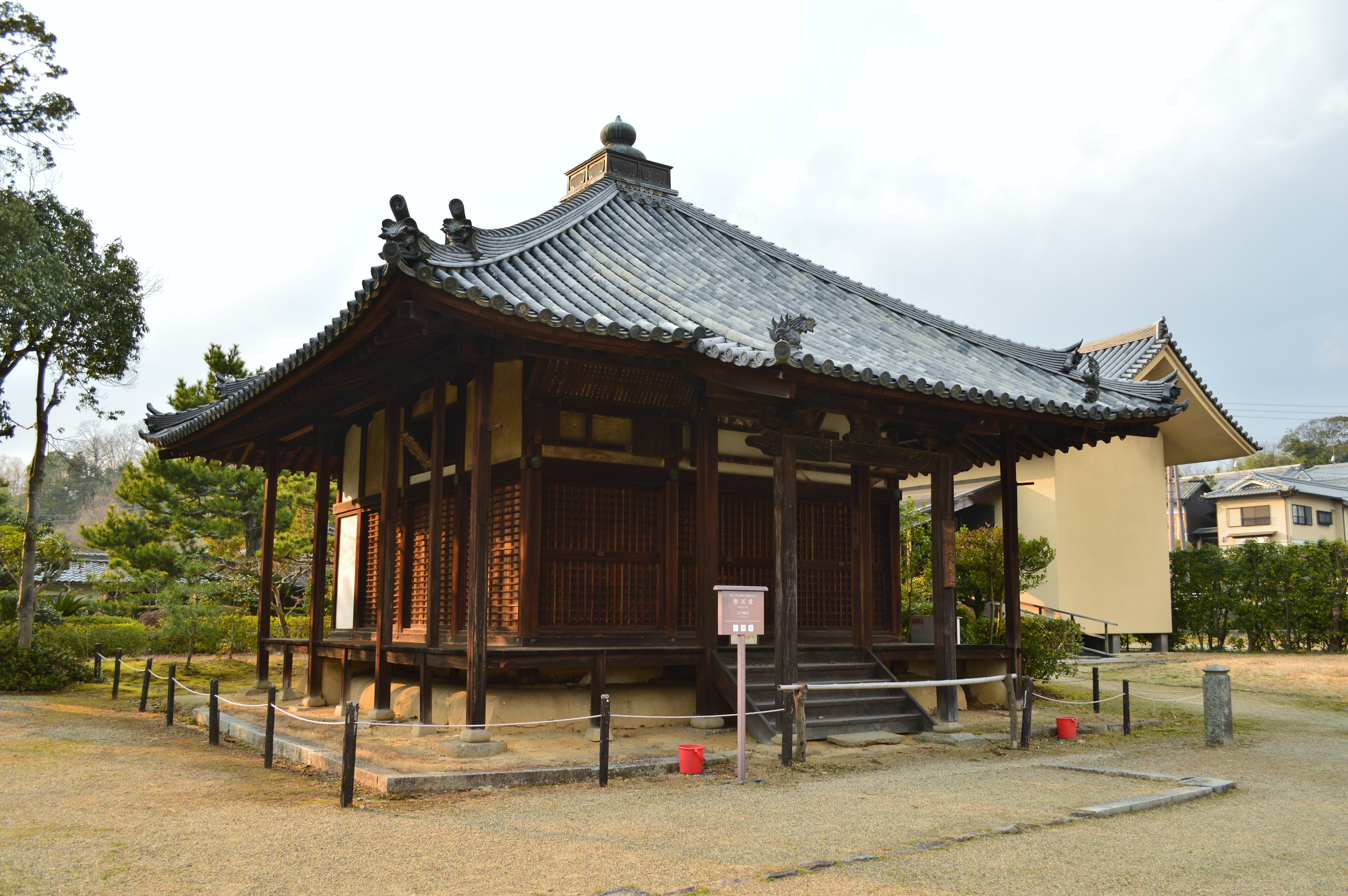
Saiten-dō (on site of the Kondo)

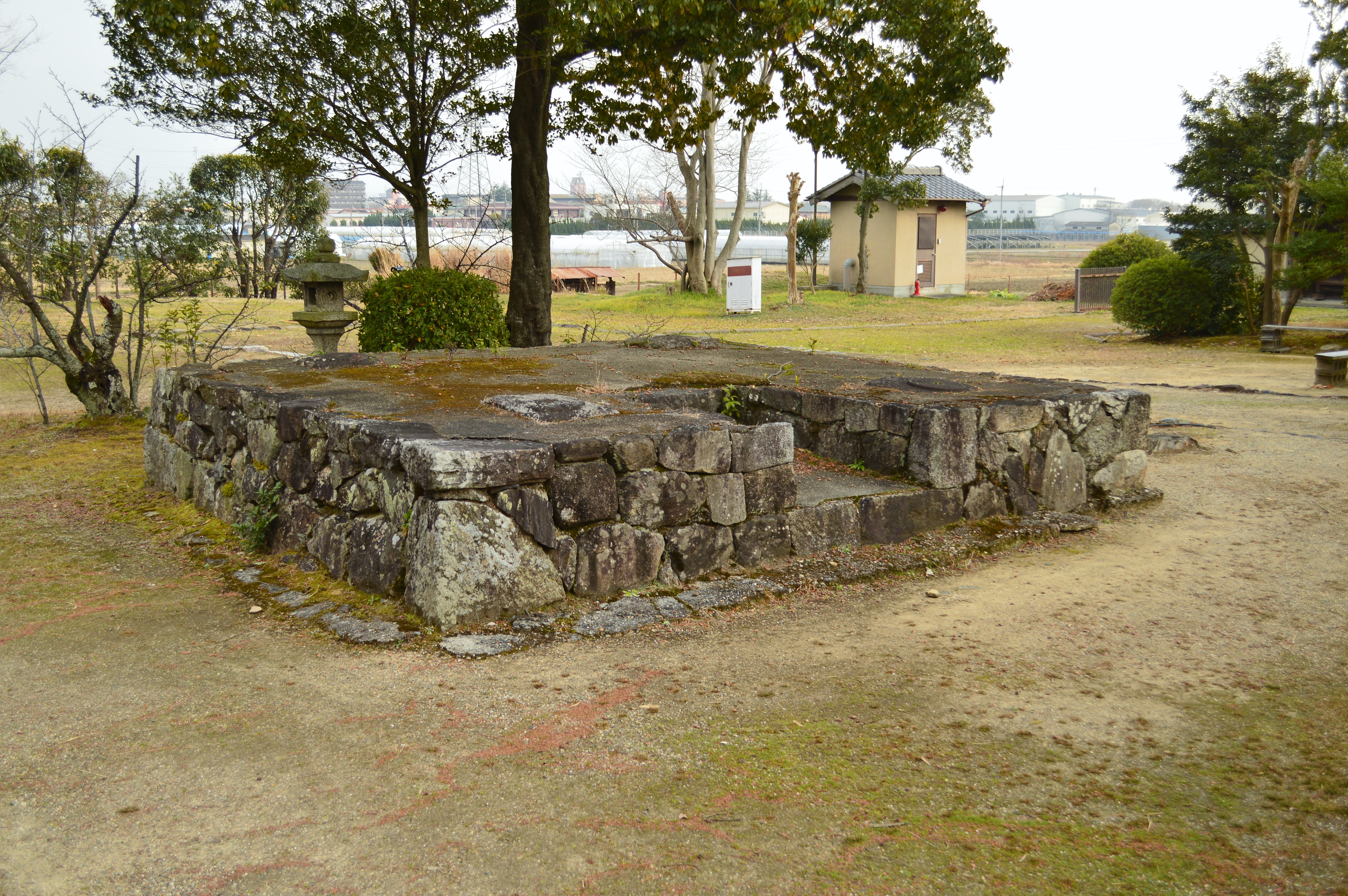
Site of the Shōrō

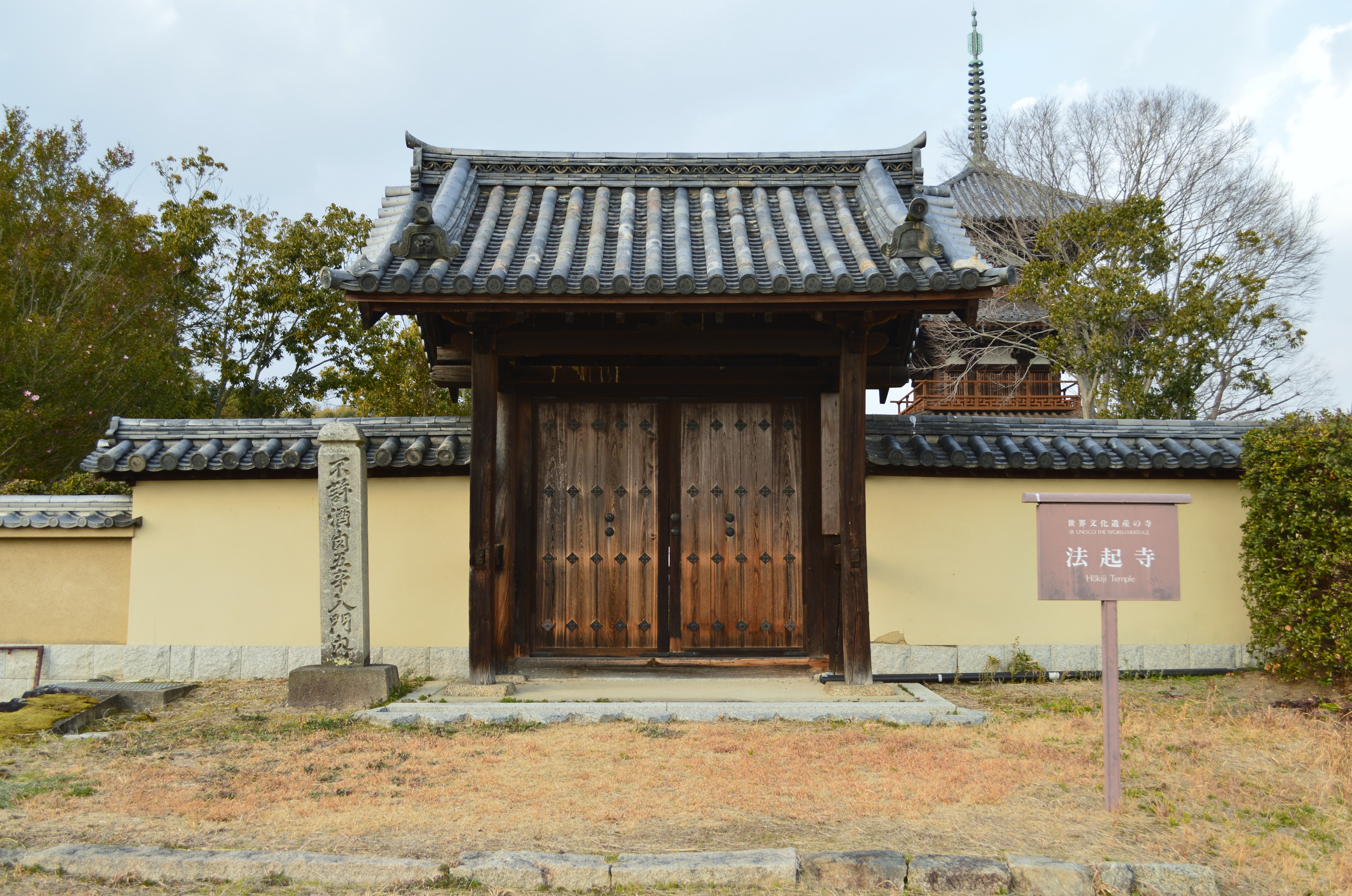
South Gate

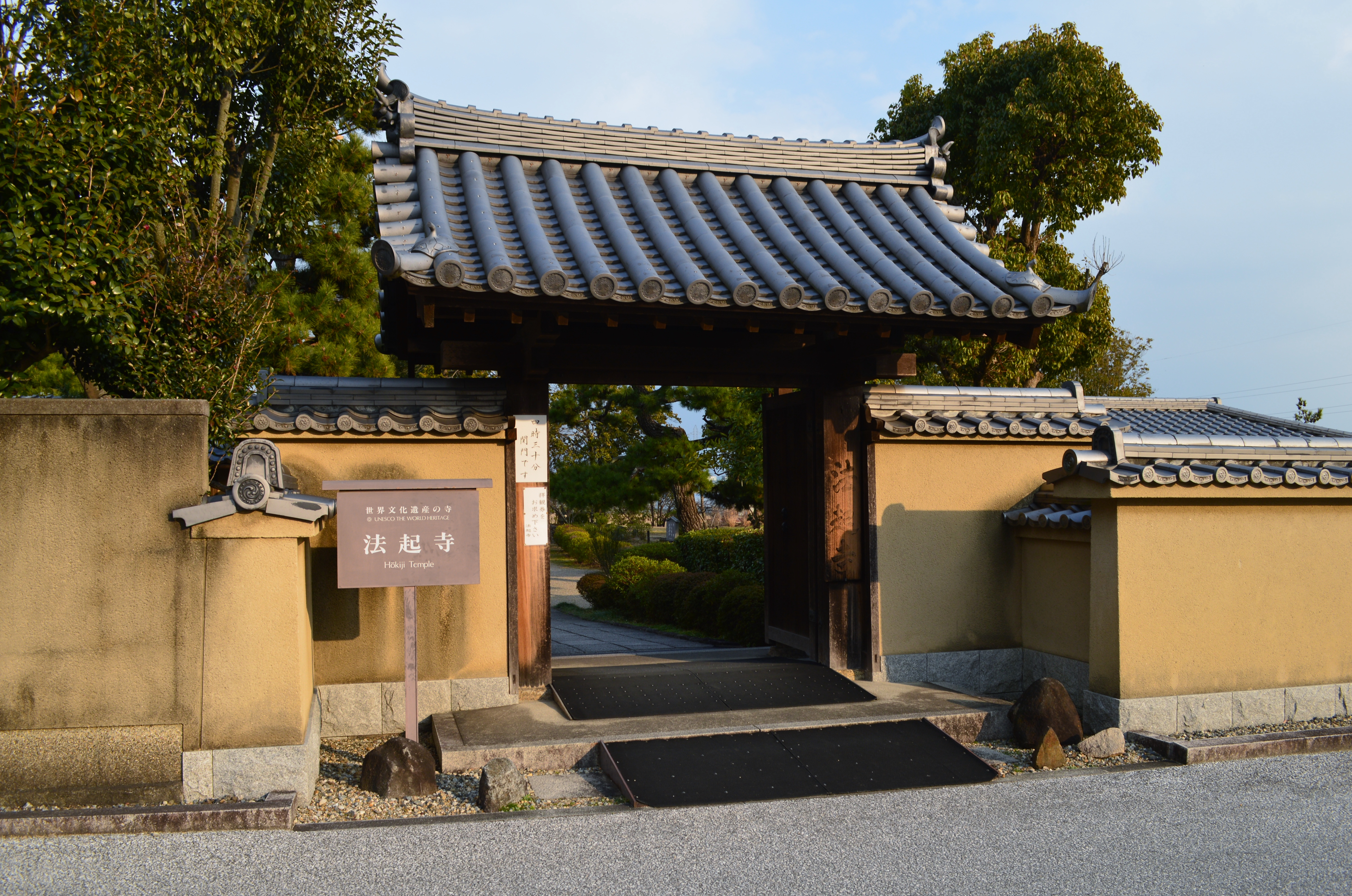
West Gate

== Cultural properties ==
- Three-story pagoda (三重塔). ( National Treasure) This structure is believed to have been completed in 706 AD. It is 24 meters tall and is the oldest three-story pagoda in Japan. It is also the largest three-story pagoda in Japan, excluding the unique Yakushi-ji East Pagoda. Japanese wooden pagodas are generally square three-bay (meaning that there are four pillars lined up on both sides, resulting in three bays between the pillars), but the Hokki-ji pagoda has a unique style with three bays between the pillars on the first and second floors and two bays between the pillars on the third floor. The five-story pagoda of Hōryū-ji, which was built around the same time, also has two bays between the pillars on the top five floors, and it has been pointed out that the size of the first, third, and fifth floors of the five-story pagoda of Hōryū-ji is almost equal to the first, second, and third floors of the three-story pagoda of Hokki-ji. The three-story pagoda of Hokki-ji was repaired in 1262 and extensively remodeled during the Enpō era (1673-1681) of the Edo period, when the triple-story pillar spacing was changed from two to three bays, but during dismantling and repair work from 1970 to 1975, it was restored to its original form based on the traces remaining on the materials. The double and triple balustrades were also restored at the time of dismantling and repair work. After the Meiji period, there have been two conservation projects, from 1898 to 1899 and from 1972 to 1975. Between 1972 and 1975, restorers completely demolished the building and then put it back again. Modern restorers removed the decayed mortise and tenon structures from the columns and beams and added new modules. They burned the date "shdwa 48" into these new modules for easier identification by later restorers. Fire prevention systems such as fire detection systems and water fire extinguishing systems have also been established. Records of the details of these works, including the results of investigations, plans and photographs were made into reports and published in 1975.
- Standing Jūichimen Kannon Bosatsu (木造十一面観音立像) (Important Cultural Property). The honzon of the temple, this 3.5-meter-tall (11 ft) statue was carved in the latter half of the 10th century.
- Standing Bosatsu statue (銅造菩薩立像) (Important Cultural Property). This copper image of a bodhisattva constructed in the latter half of the seventh century is currently entrusted to the Nara National Museum.

== See also ==
- List of National Treasures of Japan (temples)
- List of Historic Sites of Japan (Nara)
