= Ikaruga, Nara =

Ikaruga 斑鳩町
- Town
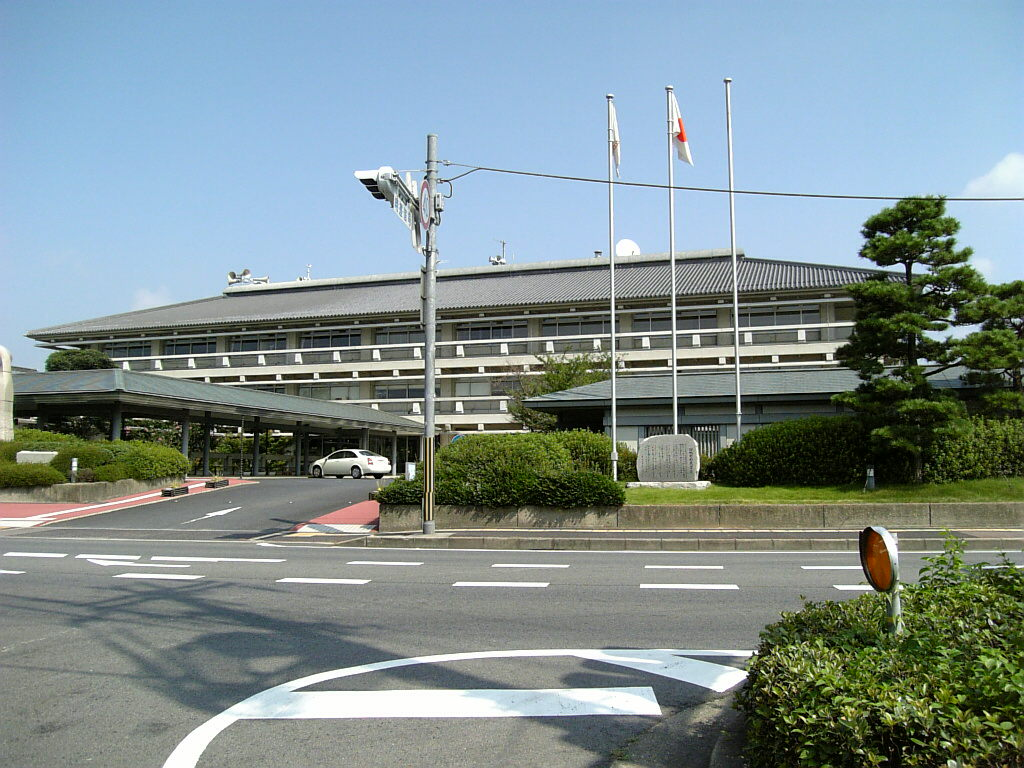
- Ikaruga Town Hall

- Flag Chapter
- Interactive map of Ikaruga
- Location in Japan
- Coordinates: 34°36′32″N 135°43′50″E
- Country: Japan
- Region: Kansai
- Prefecture: Nara
- District: Ikoma

Area
  - Total: 14.27 km^{2} (5.51 sq mi)

Population (December 31, 2024)
  - Total: 28,036
  - Density: 1,965/km^{2} (5,089/sq mi)
- Time zone: UTC+09:00 (JST)
- City hall address: 3-7-12 Hōryūjinishi, Ikaruga-cho 630-8580
- Website: Official website
- Symbols
- Bird: Japanese grosbeak
- Flower: Camellia sasanqua
- Tree: Japanese Black Pine

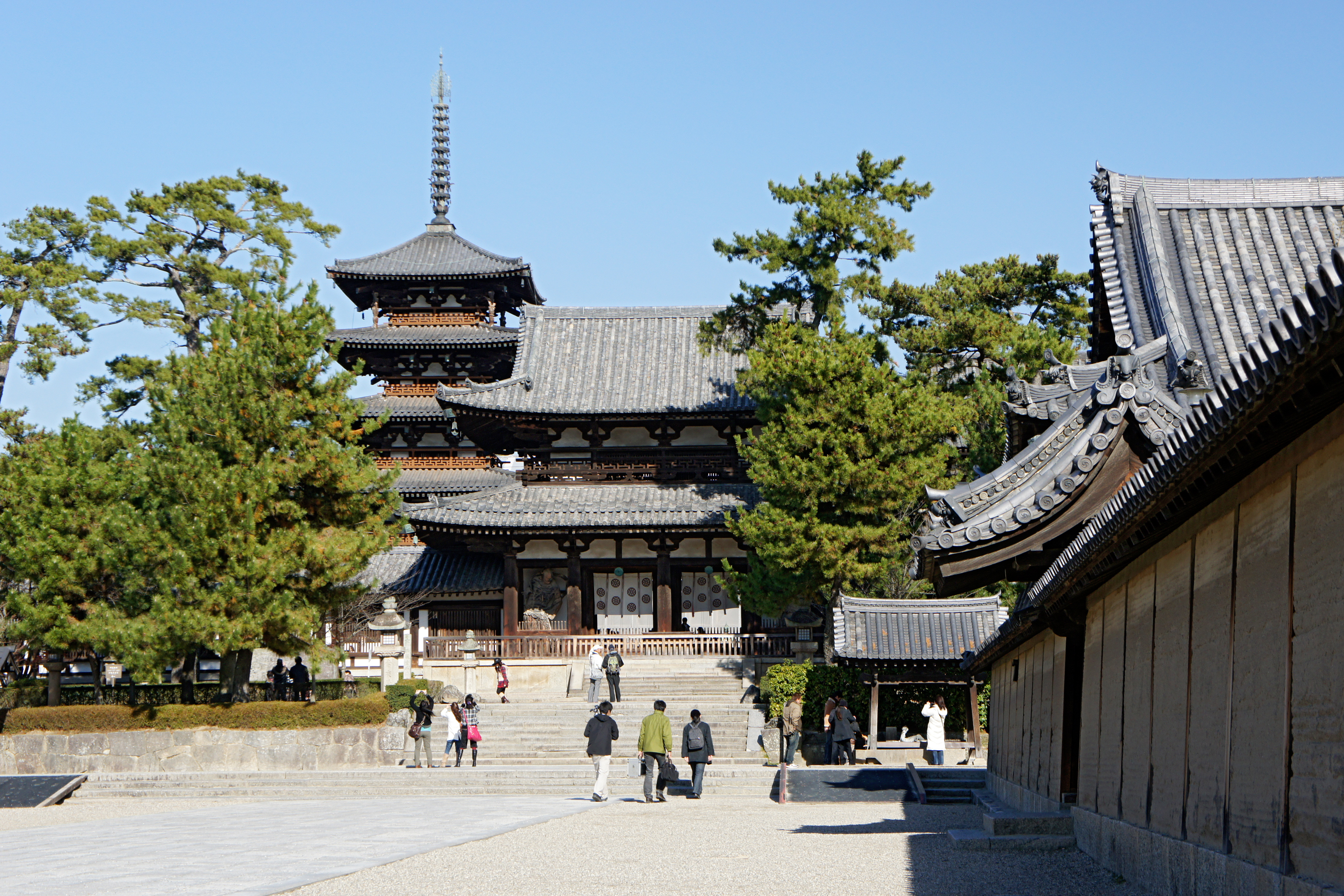
Horyu-ji

Ikaruga (斑鳩町, Ikaruga-chō) is a town in Ikoma District, Nara, Japan. As of 31 December 2024, the town had an estimated population of 28,036 in 12,292 households, and a population density of 2000 persons per km^{2}. The total area of the town is 14.27 km^{2} (5.51 sq mi) Ikaruga is home to Hōryū-ji and Hokki-ji, ancient Buddhist temples collectively inscribed as UNESCO World Heritage Sites. Other ancient temples include Hōrin-ji, also in the vicinity of Hōryū-ji. The town was named after the palace of Prince Shōtoku, Ikaruga-no-Miya (Imperial Palace of Ikaruga, or Imperial House of Ikaruga), whose grounds were at Hōryū-ji.

== Geography ==
Topographically, Ikaruga is divided into a mountain forest area in the north, a hilly area in the center, and a plain area in the south. The northern mountain forest area is the southern end of the Yata Hills, which are part of the Ikoma Mountains, and Mount Matsuo is located there. The Tatsuta River flows on the west side of the town, and the Tomio River flows on the east side

== Neighboring municipalities ==
Nara Prefecture

- Ando
- Heguri
- Ikoma
- Kawai
- Ōji
- Sangō
- Yamatokōriyama

=== Climate ===
Ikaruga has a humid subtropical climate (Köppen Cfa) characterized by warm summers and cool winters with light to no snowfall. The average annual temperature in Ikaruga is 14.6 °C. The average annual rainfall is 1636 mm with September as the wettest month. The temperatures are highest on average in August, at around 26.7 °C, and lowest in January, at around 3.1 °C.

=== Demographics ===
Per Japanese census data, the population of Ikaruga is as shown below:

Historical population
Year	Pop.	±%
1940	8,318	—
1950	10,589	+27.3%
1960	10,657	+0.6%
1970	16,892	+58.5%
1980	25,754	+52.5%
1990	27,595	+7.1%
2000	28,566	+3.5%
2010	27,734	−2.9%
2020	27,587	−0.5%

== History ==
The area of Ikaruga is part of ancient Yamato Province, and was densely settled in the Kofun period, with many ancient burial mounds surviving within the town borders. It was also an early center of Buddhism in Japan during the Asuka period, with a number of ancient temples surviving to the present day, The villages of Tatsuta, Tomisato and Horyuji were established on April 1, 1889, with the creation of the modern municipalities system. Tatsuta was raised to town status on April 2, 1891. On February 11, 1947, Tatsuta merged with Tomisato and Horyuji to form the town of Ikaruga.

== Government ==
Ikaruga has a mayor-council form of government with a directly elected mayor and a unicameral town council of 13 members. Ikaruga, collectively with the other municipalities of Ikoma District contributes three members to the Nara Prefectural Assembly. In terms of national politics, the town is part of the Nara 2nd district of the lower house of the Diet of Japan.

== Economy ==
Ikaruga has a mixed economy of agriculture, commerce and light manufacturing. Due to its location, the town is increasing becoming a commuter town for the greater Osaka metropolis.

== Education ==
Ikaruga has three public elementary schools and two public junior high schools operated by the town government and one public high school operated by the Nara Prefectural Board of Education.

=== Elementary schools ===
- Ikaruga Elementary School
- Ikarugahigashi Elementary School
- Ikaruganishi Elementary School

=== Junior high schools ===
- Ikaruga Junior High School
- Ikarugaminami Junior High School

=== High schools ===
- Hōryū-ji International High School

== Transportation ==
=== Railways ===
JR West - Kansai Main Line (Yamatoji Line)

Q Hōryūji

=== Highways ===
- National Route 25
- National Route 168

== Local attractions ==
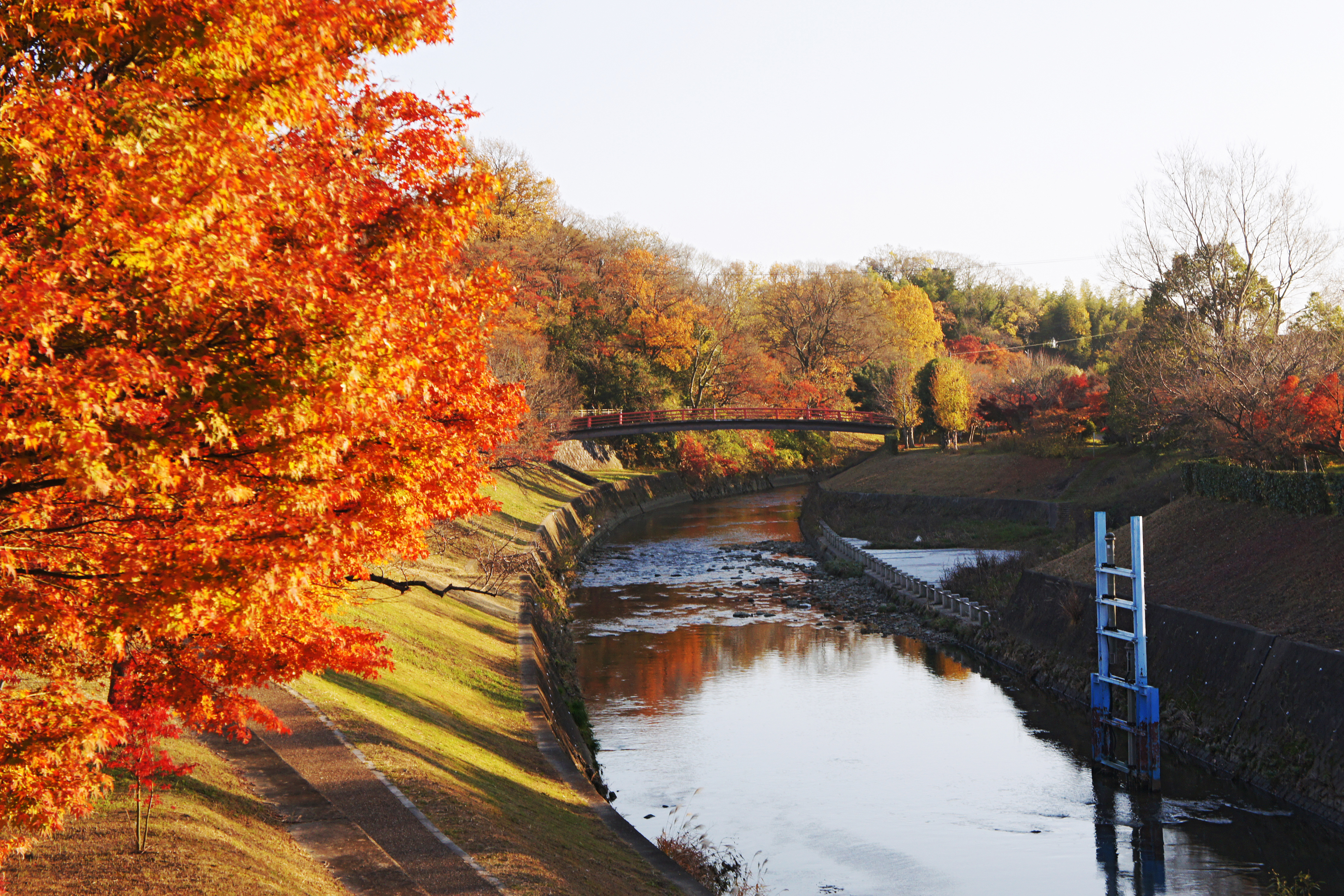
Tatsuta River

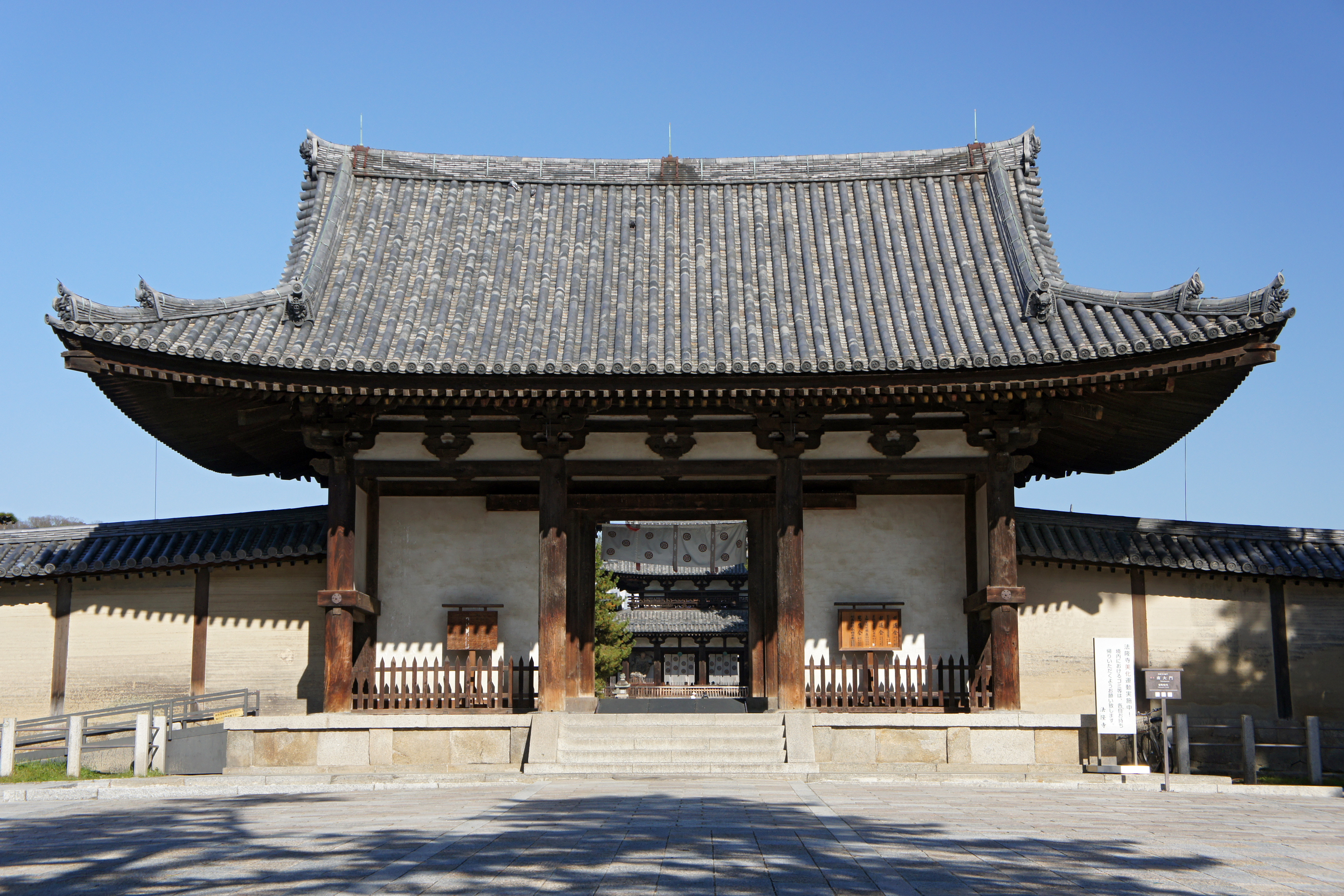
Gate to Horyū-ji in Ikaruga

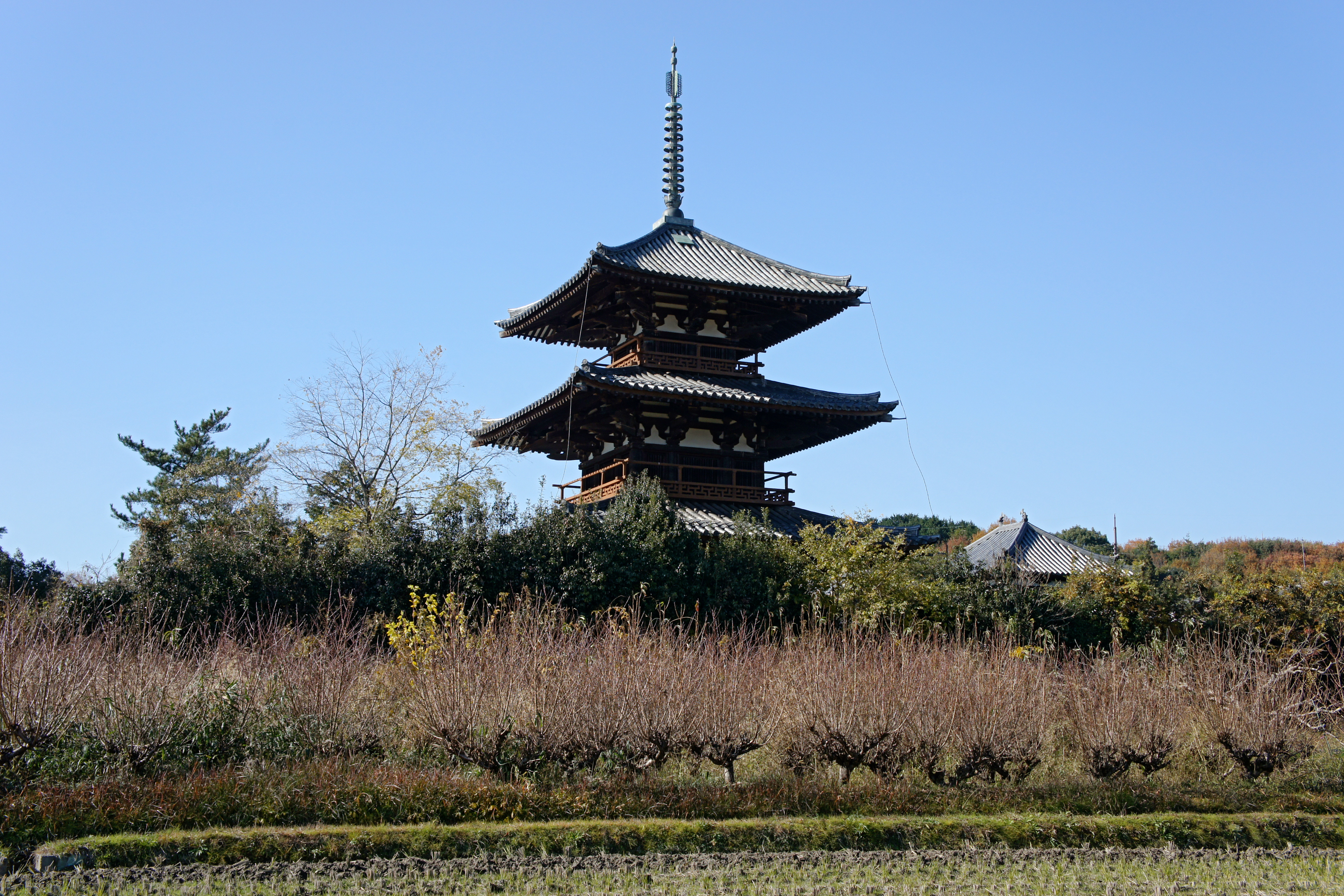
Hokki-ji

=== Temples and shrines ===
- Chūgū-ji
- Ikaruga Shrine
- Hokki-ji
- Hōrin-ji
- Hōryū-ji
- Kichiden-ji
- Mimuroyama
- Ryūta Shrine

=== Kofun ===
- Fujinoki Kofun
- Kasuga Kofun
- Okanohara Kofun
- Terayama Kofun
