= Buddhist Monuments in the Hōryū-ji Area =

Buddhist Monuments in the Horyu-ji Area
UNESCO World Heritage Site
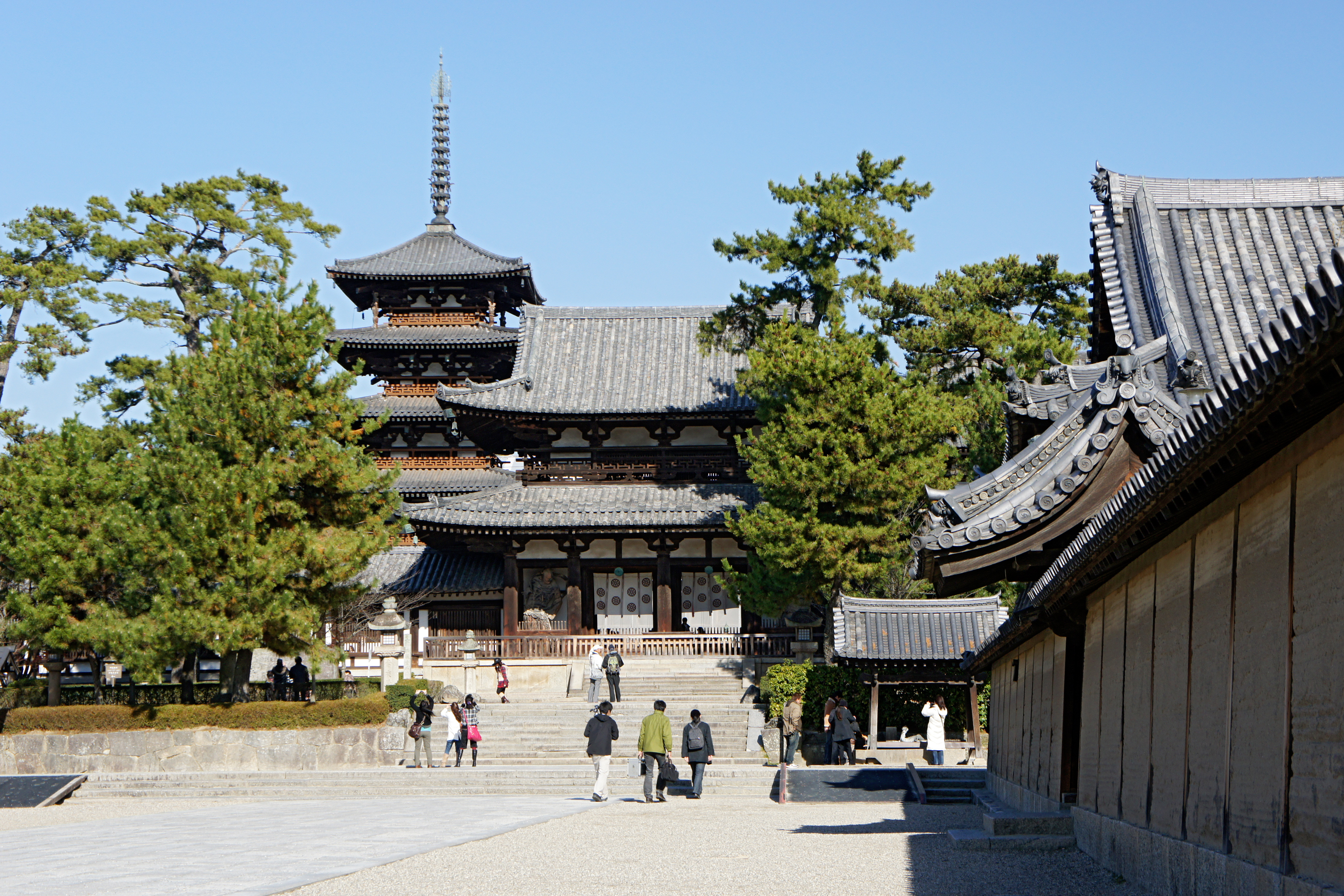

- Location within Kansai region Location within Japan
- Location: Ikaruga, Ikoma District, Nara Prefecture, Kansai region, Japan
- Includes: 1. Horyu-ji Area; 2. Hokki-ji Area
- Criteria: Cultural: (i), (ii), (iv), (vi)
- Reference: 660
- Inscription: 1993 (17th Session)
- Area: 15.03 ha (37.1 acres)
- Buffer zone: 571 ha (1,410 acres)
- Coordinates: 34°37′N 135°44′E

The UNESCO World Heritage Site Buddhist Monuments in the Hōryū-ji Area includes a variety of buildings found in Hōryū-ji and Hokki-ji in Ikaruga, Nara Prefecture, Japan. These buildings were designated in 1993 along with the surrounding landscape, under several criteria. The structures inscribed are some of the oldest extant wooden buildings in the world, dating from the 7th to 8th centuries. Many of the monuments are also National Treasures of Japan, and reflect an important age of Buddhist influence in Japan. The structures include 21 buildings in the Hōryū-ji East Temple, 9 in the West Temple, 17 monasteries and other buildings, and the pagoda in Hokki-ji.

== Horyuji Kondo ==
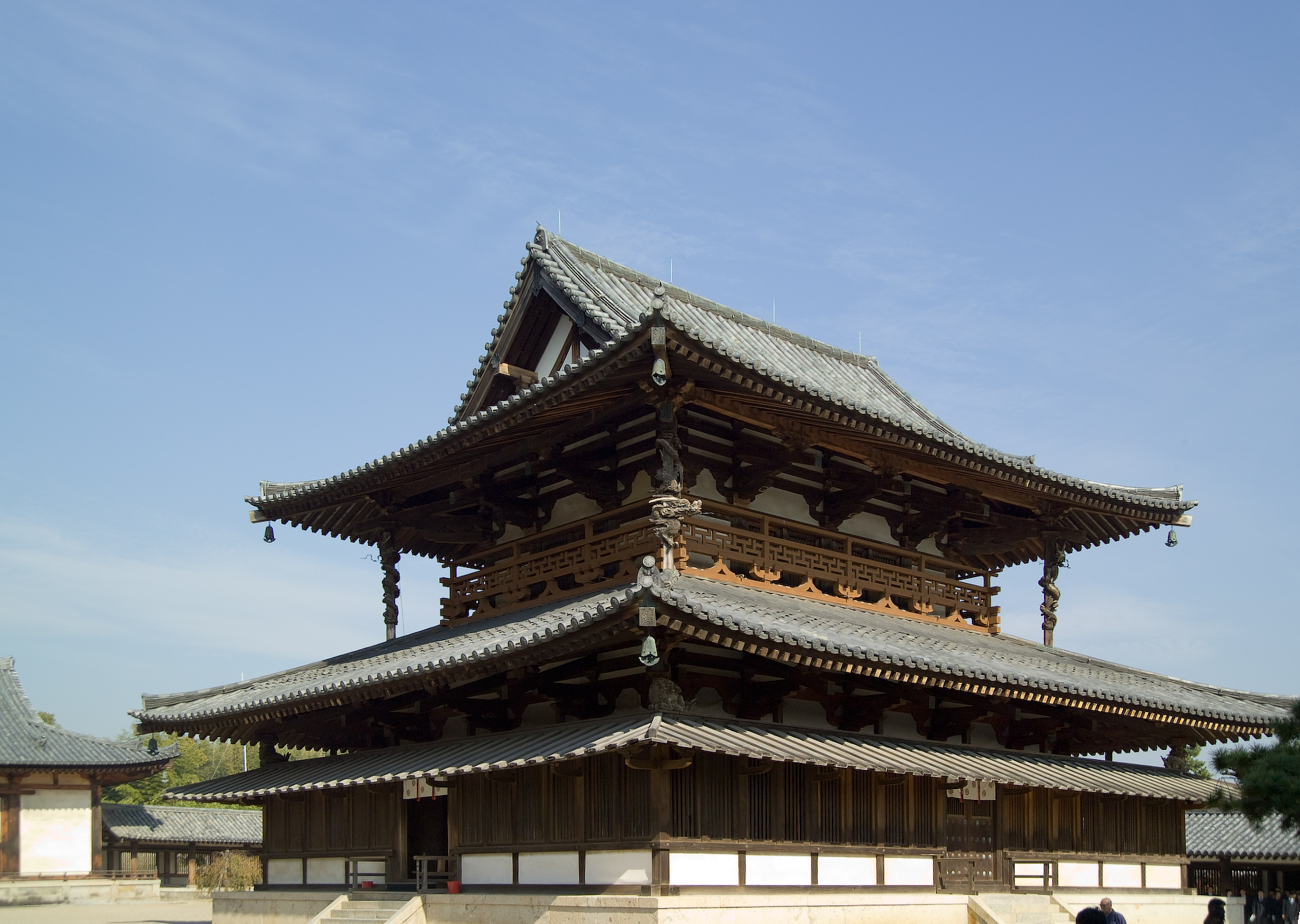
Horyuji Kondo

The kondo, also known as the Golden Hall, is located within the gates of the Horyuji temple complex. The structure sits near the center next to the Horyuji Pagoda. The two structures are significant, yet for very different reasons. The Kondo was built with the intention of being used for Buddhist worship. On the outside, the Kondo appears to the viewer as a two story structure. However, only the first floor is operative (Mizuno, 92). The roof of the Kondo displays the hip and gable style that is frequently seen in East Asian architecture (Cartwright, Ancient History Encyclopedia). The exterior of the wooden structure has also been decorated with images of dragons and the water deity (Cartwright, Ancient History Encyclopedia). Upon entering the building, the viewer is faced with a magnificent sight: The Shaka Triad and the Yakushi sculptures.

=== The Shaka Triad ===
The Shaka Triad is located within the Horyuji Kondo building. The sculpture has been placed on a raised platform so that when the viewer enters the building, they will have to look up in order to observe the piece. Shaka sits between his two attendants in the mediation position. The skirt that Shaka wears falls over his legs and the platform that he sits on in a style known as waterfall drapery. His hands are positioned in two different mudras. The right hand is positioned in the reassurance mudra and the left hand is in that of the wish granting mudra. Behind the Shaka is an intricately decorated mandorla with a lotus flower directly in the center. Right above the head of shaka is a raised circle that is meant to stand as a representation of the Buddhist jewel of wisdom. On the outer parts of the mandorla are seven small Buddha figures. These figures are intended to represent the seven Buddhas that came before Shaka. The two attendants have been placed on lotus flowers. Each figure holds a jewel in their hand.

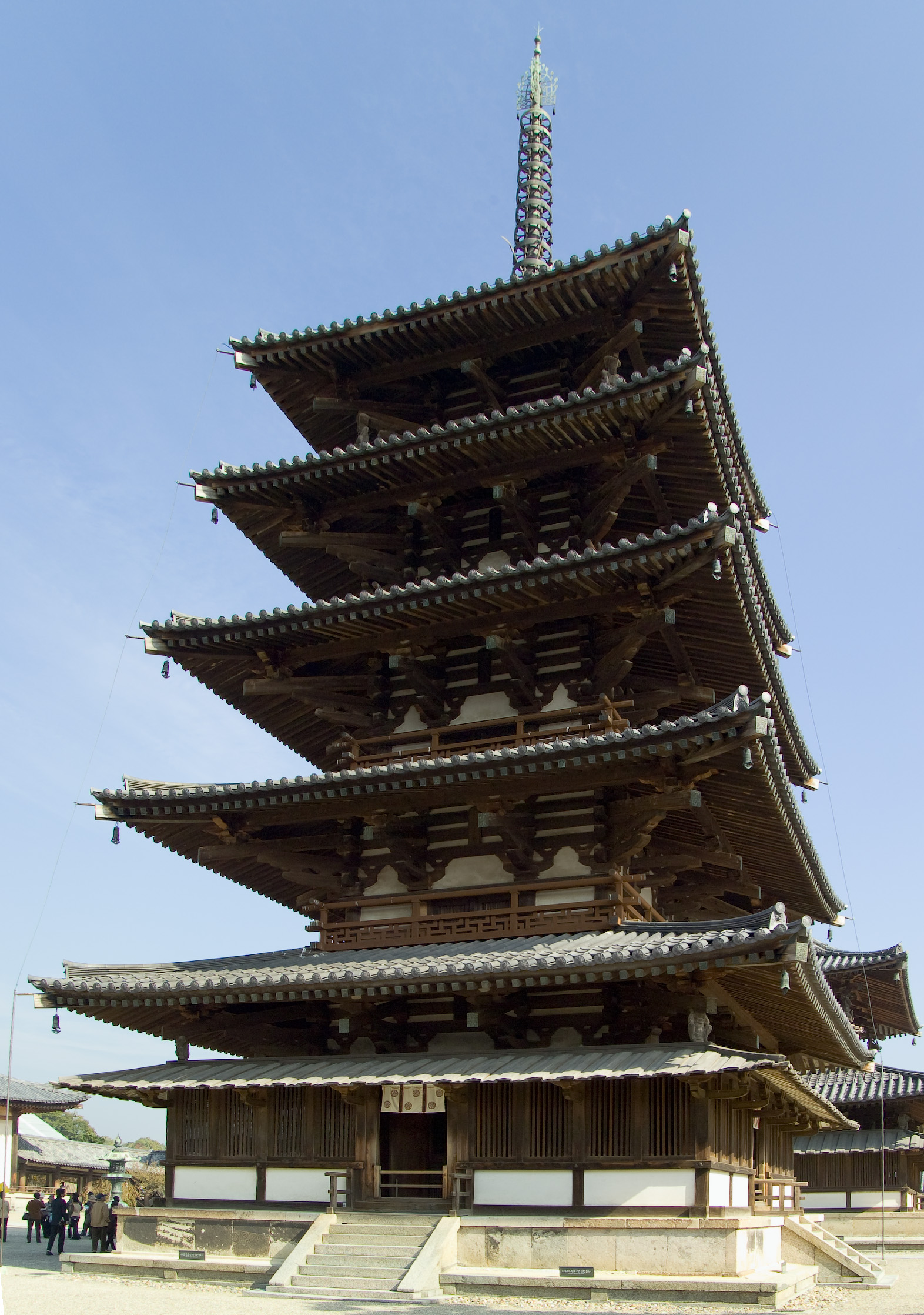
Horyuji Pagoda

== Horyuji Pagoda ==
Next to the Horyuji kondo stands the Horyuji Pagoda. The Kondo functions as a space for Buddhist worship, but the pagoda serves an entirely different purpose. The five storied structure stands at Horyuji as a sort of reliquary or memorial site. The structure was also built to represent a diagram of the universe. If you stop and look at the building, you will notice that the roofs on each story get smaller and smaller the closer they get to the top. The center post of the pagoda is built into a stone foundation that actually holds buddhist treasures and relics inside. These relics were put inside of vessels made out of glass, gold, and silver.

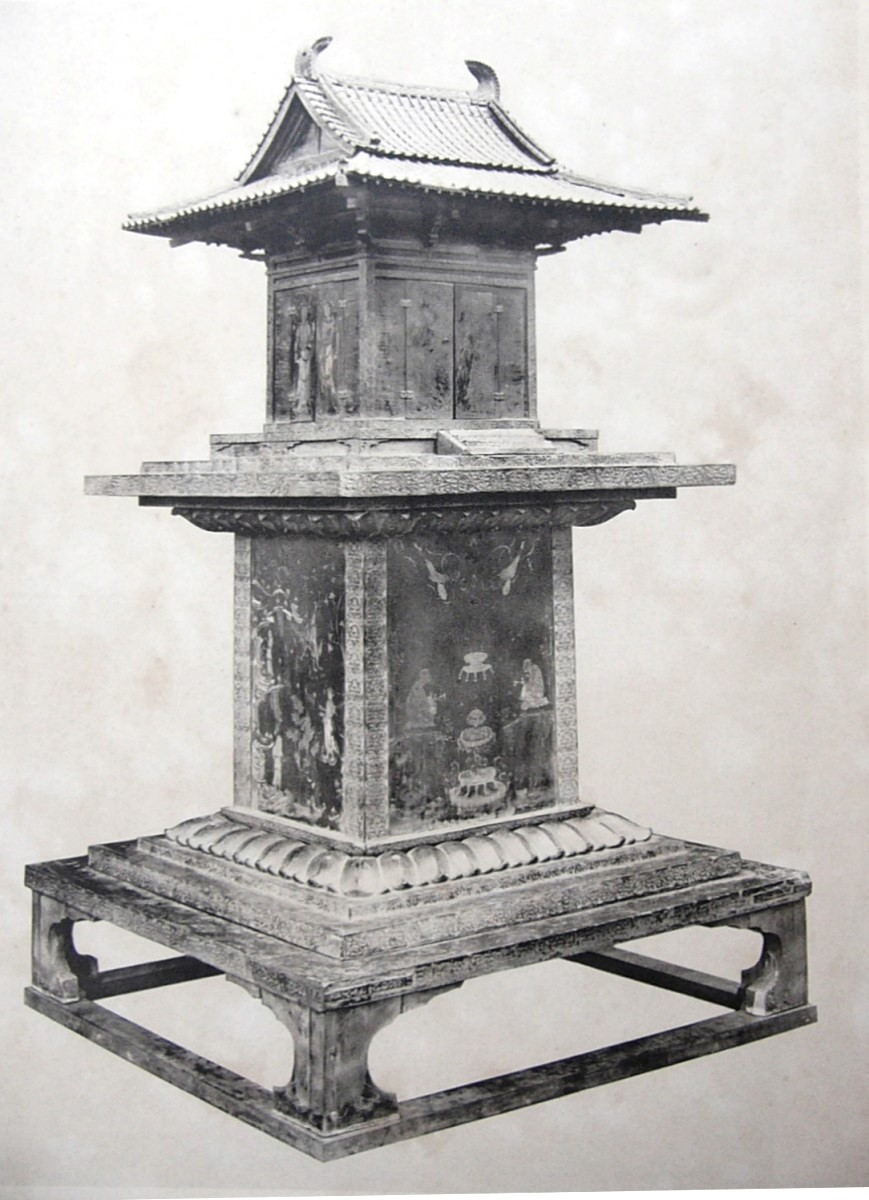
Tamamushi Shrine

== The Tamamushi Shrine ==
The Tamamushi Shrine is located within the Treasure House at Horyuji. The shrine is made up of a small Kondo that has been placed on top of a rectangular base. Similar to that of the Horyuji Kondo, the miniature kondo on the shrine has a hip and gabled roof and exhibits many architectural features of the Asuka period. The shrine has been elaborately decorated with many extensive details. Inside of the shrine is a small statue of Kannon, a buddhist Bodhisattva. The interior walls have also been lined with many small Buddha figures. On the front of the rectangular base are images of the four guardian kings and on the side panels are images of bodhisattvas standing on lotus flowers. The back panel shows Mount Ryoju, the location in which Shaka preached the Lotus Sutra. On the upper pedestal of the shrine, the front has paintings that depict representations of Buddhist relics. The back of the pedestal has an image of location that is known to be the center of the universe. This location holds the heavens, the oceans and the earth apart from each other. This place is known as Mount Sumeru. The right panel shows a picture of the Buddha in a previous life and the left panel shows the scene of "The Hungry Tigress Jataka".

=== The Hungry Tigress Jataka ===
The Hungry Tigress Jataka is a tale in the theme of self sacrifice. In this story, the Bodhisattva is walking through the forest when he encounters a tigress and her starving cubs. In order to save the lives of the starving animals, the bodhisattva hikes to the top of mountain located nearby and jumps off. The smell of the blood coming from the Bodhisattva's body is enough to rouse the weak tigress and her starving cubs so that they may eat.

== List of sites ==
Name	Type	Location	Picture
Hōryū-ji (法隆寺) Area	Temple	Ikaruga-chō, Ikoma-gun, Nara-ken	
Hokki-ji (法起寺) Area	Temple	Ikaruga-chō, Ikoma-gun, Nara-ken	

== Gallery ==
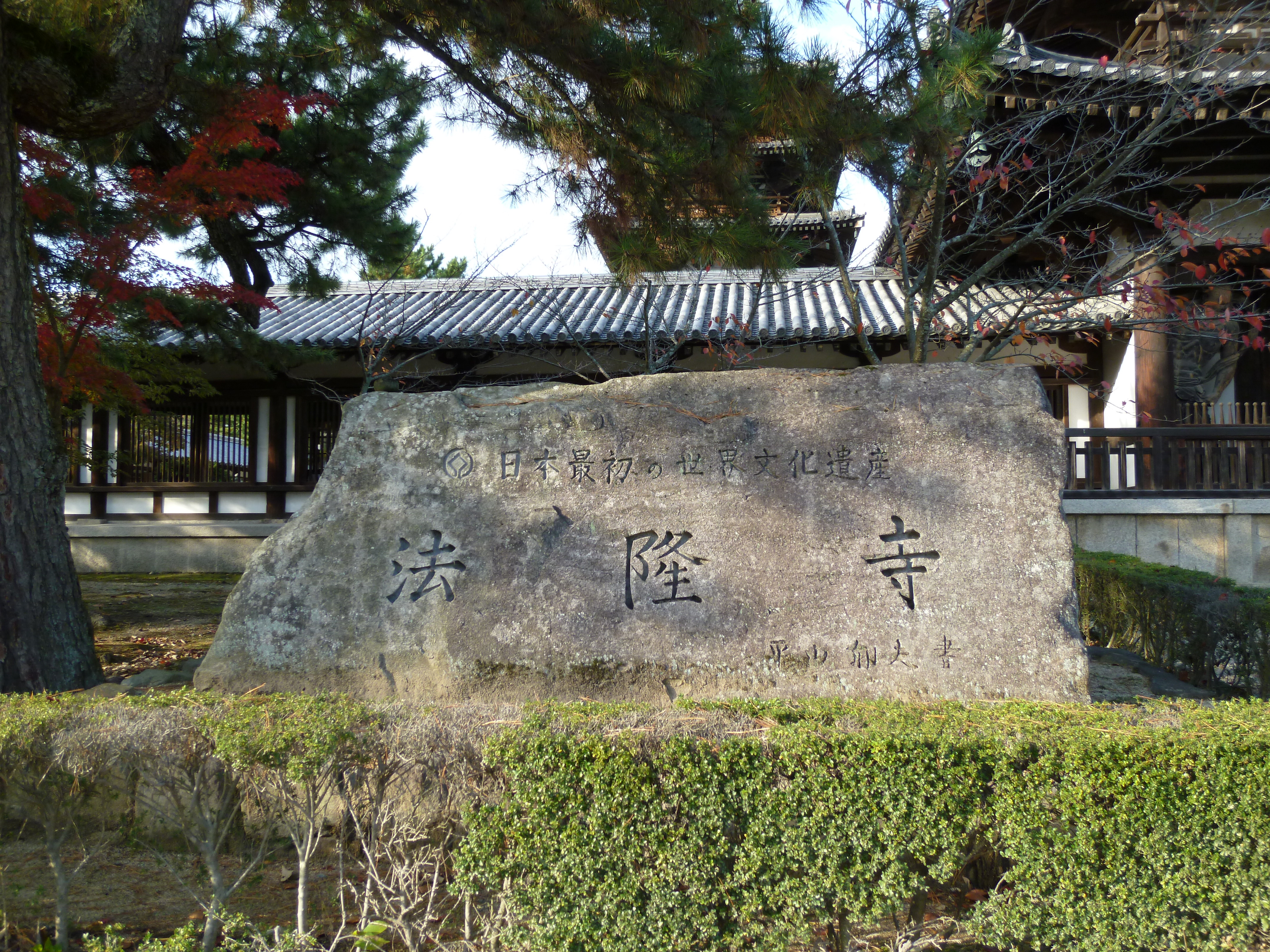
Buddhist Monuments in the Horyu-ji Area

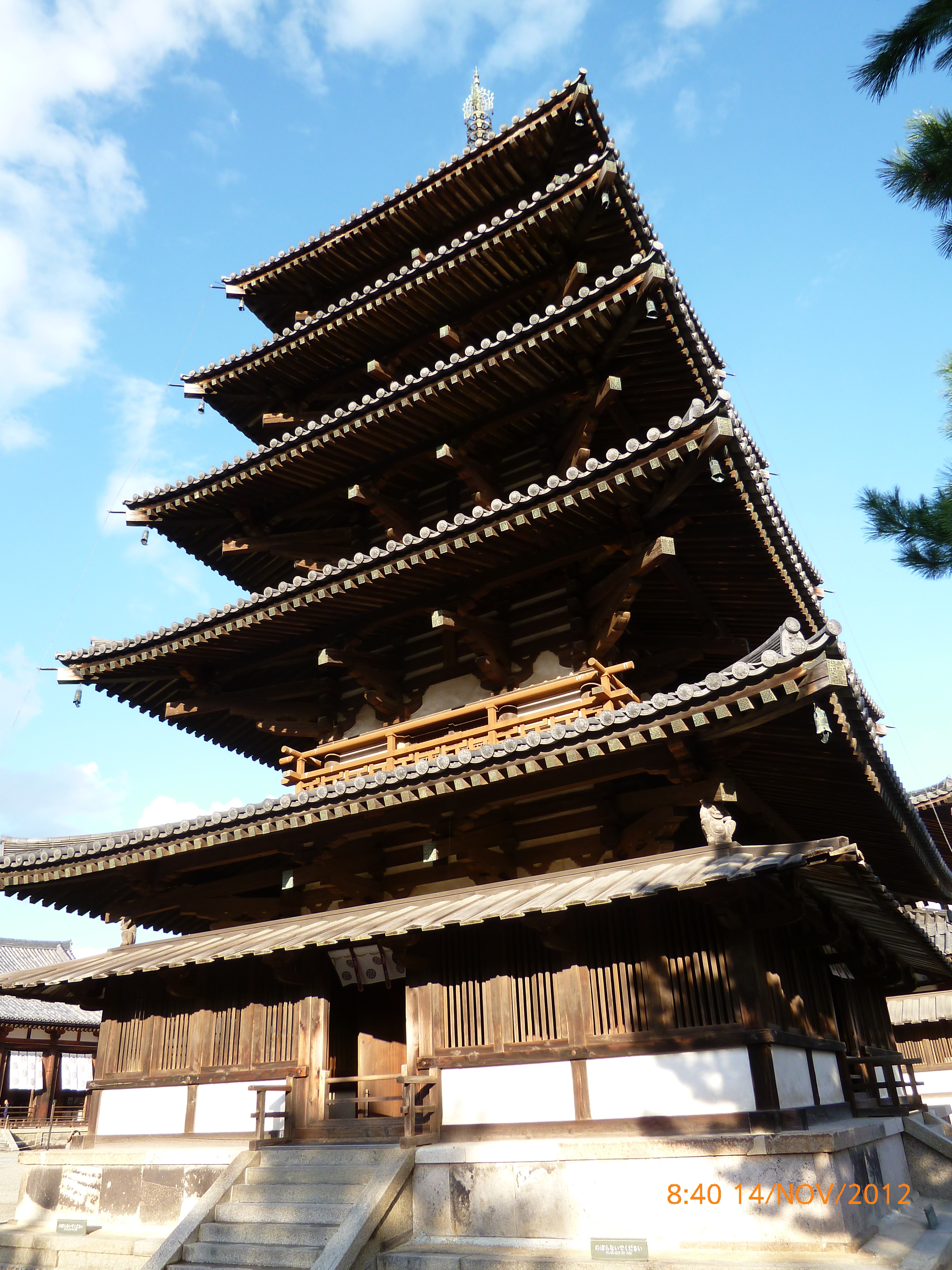
Buddhist monuments in the Horyu-ji Area

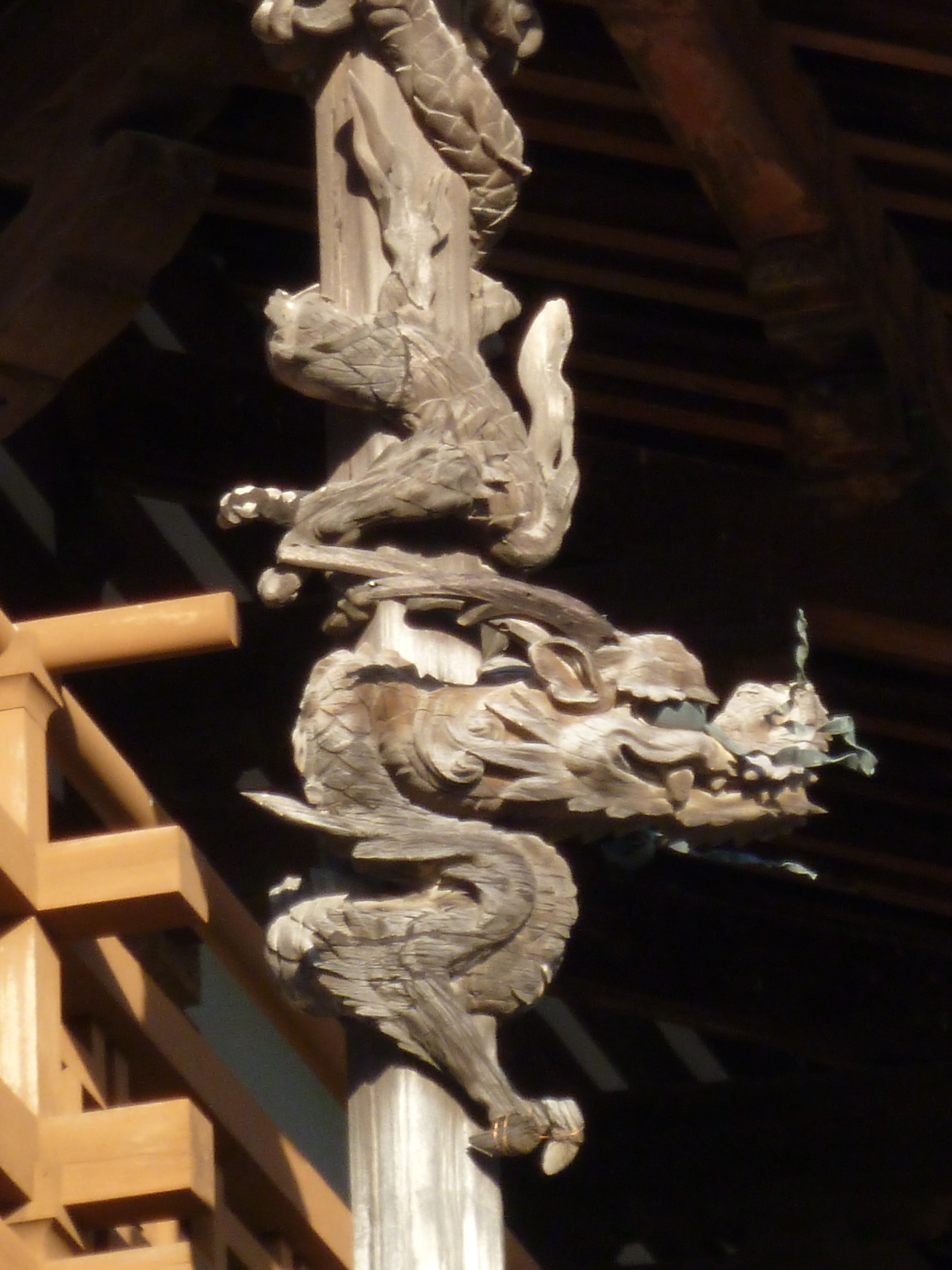
Detail of wood carving

== See also ==
- List of World Heritage Sites in Japan
- Tourism in Japan
