= World Heritage Earthen Architecture Programme =

UNESCO initiative

The World Heritage Earthen Architecture Programme (WHEAP) is a UNESCO initiative promoting earthen architecture founded in 2007 and running till 2017.

== Sites ==
At the programme's conclusion in 2017, the 150 World Heritage Sites in its ambit were the following:

- Alhambra, Generalife and Albayzín, Granada
- Ancient Ksour of Ouadane, Chinguetti, Tichitt and Oualata
- Ancient City of Damascus
- Ancient City of Ping Yao
- Ancient Thebes with its Necropolis
- Angkor
- Antigua Guatemala
- Archaeological Ruins at Moenjodaro
- Archaeological Site of Carthage
- Archaeological Site of Volubilis
- Archaeological Zone of Paquimé, Casas Grandes
- Asante Traditional Buildings
- Ashur (Qal'at Sherqat)
- At-Turaif District in ad-Dir'iyah
- Bahla Fort
- Bam and its Cultural Landscape
- Biblical Tels - Megiddo, Hazor, Beer Sheba
- Buddhist Monuments in the Horyu-ji Area
- Cahokia Mounds State Historic Site
- Canal du Midi
- Capital Cities and Tombs of the Ancient Koguryo Kingdom
- Cathedral, Alcázar and Archivo de Indias in Seville
- Chaco Culture
- Chan Chan Archaeological Zone
- Changdeokgung Palace Complex
- Churches and Convents of Goa
- City of Cuzco
- City of Potosí
- City of Quito
- City of Safranbolu
- Classical Gardens of Suzhou
- Cliff of Bandiagara (Land of the Dogons)
- Coffee Cultural Landscape of Colombia
- Complex of Koguryo Tombs
- Coro and its Port
- Cultural Landscape and Archaeological Remains of the Bamiyan Valley
- Cultural Sites of Al Ain (Hafit, Hili, Bidaa Bint Saud and Oases Areas)
- Fortifications of Vauban
- Frontiers of the Roman Empire
- Fujian Tulou
- Gyeongju Historic Areas
- Haeinsa Temple Janggyeong Panjeon, the Depositories for the Tripitaka Koreana Woodblocks
- Harar Jugol, the Fortified Historic Town
- Hatra
- Himeji-jo
- Historic Centre of Bukhara
- Historic Centre of Camagüey
- Historic Centre of Cordoba
- Historic Centre of Évora
- Historic Centre of Guimarães
- Historic Centre of Lima
- Historic Centre of Morelia
- Historic Centre of Oaxaca and Archaeological Site of Monte Albán
- Historic Centre of Porto, Luiz I Bridge and Monastery of Serra do Pilar
- Historic Centre of Puebla
- Historic Centre of Salvador de Bahia
- Historic Centre of Santa Ana de los Ríos de Cuenca
- Historic Centre of Santa Cruz de Mompox
- Historic Centre of São Luís
- Historic Centre of Shakhrisyabz
- Historic Centre of the Town of Diamantina
- Historic Centre of the Town of Goiás
- Historic Centre of the Town of Olinda
- Historic Centre of Zacatecas
- Historic City of Meknes
- Historic City of Sucre
- Historic Ensemble of the Potala Palace, Lhasa
- Historic Monuments of Ancient Kyoto (Kyoto, Uji and Otsu Cities)
- Historic Monuments of Ancient Nara
- Historic Monuments Zone of Querétaro
- Historic Quarter of the City of Colonia del Sacramento
- Historic Quarter of the Seaport City of Valparaíso
- Historic Site of Lyon
- Historic Town of Guanajuato and Adjacent Mines
- Historic Town of Ouro Preto
- Historic Town of Sukhothai and Associated Historic Towns
- Historic Town of Zabid
- Historic Villages of Korea: Hahoe and Yangdong
- Historic Villages of Shirakawa-go and Gokayama
- Island of Mozambique
- Itchan Kala
- Itsukushima Shinto Shrine
- Jongmyo (Seoul)
- Joya de Cerén Archaeological Site
- Kasbah of Algiers
- Kathmandu Valley
- Koutammakou, the Land of the Batammariba
- Ksar of Ait-Ben-Haddou
- Kunya-Urgench
- León Cathedral
- M'Zab Valley
- Mausoleum of the First Qin Emperor
- Medina of Fez
- Medina of Marrakesh
- Medina of Sousse
- Medina of Tunis
- Meidan Emam, Esfahan
- Memphis and its Necropolis – the Pyramid Fields from Giza to Dahshur
- Mesa Verde National Park
- Minaret and Archaeological Remains of Jam
- Mogao Caves
- Mount Wutai
- National Archeological Park of Tierradentro
- Old City of Sana'a
- Old Havana and its Fortification System
- Old Town of Cáceres
- Old Town of Galle and its Fortifications
- Old Town of Ghadamès
- Old Town of Lijiang
- Old Towns of Djenné
- Old Walled City of Shibam
- Osun-Osogbo Sacred Grove
- Parthian Fortresses of Nisa
- Persepolis
- Port, Fortresses and Group of Monuments, Cartagena
- Pre-Hispanic City of Teotihuacan
- Protective town of San Miguel and the Sanctuary of Jesús Nazareno de Atotonilco
- Proto-urban Site of Sarazm
- Provins, Town of Medieval Fairs
- Punic Town of Kerkuane and its Necropolis
- Qal’at al-Bahrain – Ancient Harbour and Capital of Dilmun
- Rock-Hewn Churches, Lalibela
- Royal Hill of Ambohimanga
- Royal Palaces of Abomey
- Royal Tombs of the Joseon Dynasty
- Ruins of León Viejo
- Ruins of Loropéni
- Sacred City of Caral-Supe
- Samarkand – Crossroad of Cultures
- Samarra Archaeological City
- Sanctuary of Bom Jesus do Congonhas
- Seokguram Grotto and Bulguksa Temple
- Shrines and Temples of Nikko
- Shushtar Historical Hydraulic System
- Soltaniyeh
- State Historical and Cultural Park "Ancient Merv"
- Sukur Cultural Landscape
- Tabriz Historic Bazaar Complex
- Takht-e Soleyman
- Taos Pueblo
- Tchogha Zanbil
- The Great Wall
- The Persian Garden
- Timbuktu
- Tomb of Askia
- Tombs of Buganda Kings at Kasubi
- Trinidad and the Valley de los Ingenios
- Viñales Valley
- Walled City of Baku with the Shirvanshah's Palace and Maiden Tower
- Yin Xu
