= Proterra (Brazil) =

PROTERRA, or Programme for Land Redistribution and Stimulation of Agroindustry in the North and Northeast, was a Brazilian government programme of the 1970s to address rural poverty founded following the approval of the Land Statute in 1964. In the Amazon basin it was supported by the World Bank.
