= Daruma =

Daruma may refer to:

- Bodhidharma, a Buddhist monk known in Japanese as Daruma
- Daruma doll, a hollow, round Japanese doll
- Daruma Magazine, an English language magazine devoted to Japanese art and antiques
- Daruma (fish), a genus of fish
- Daruma-ji, a Buddhist temple in Japan also called "Daruma temple"

== See also ==
- Dharma (disambiguation)
- Daruma Pond Frog, a species of frog
- Daruma uta, a pejorative term for Zen poetry
