= Yachū-ji =

Buddhist temple in Habikino, Japan

- 野中寺
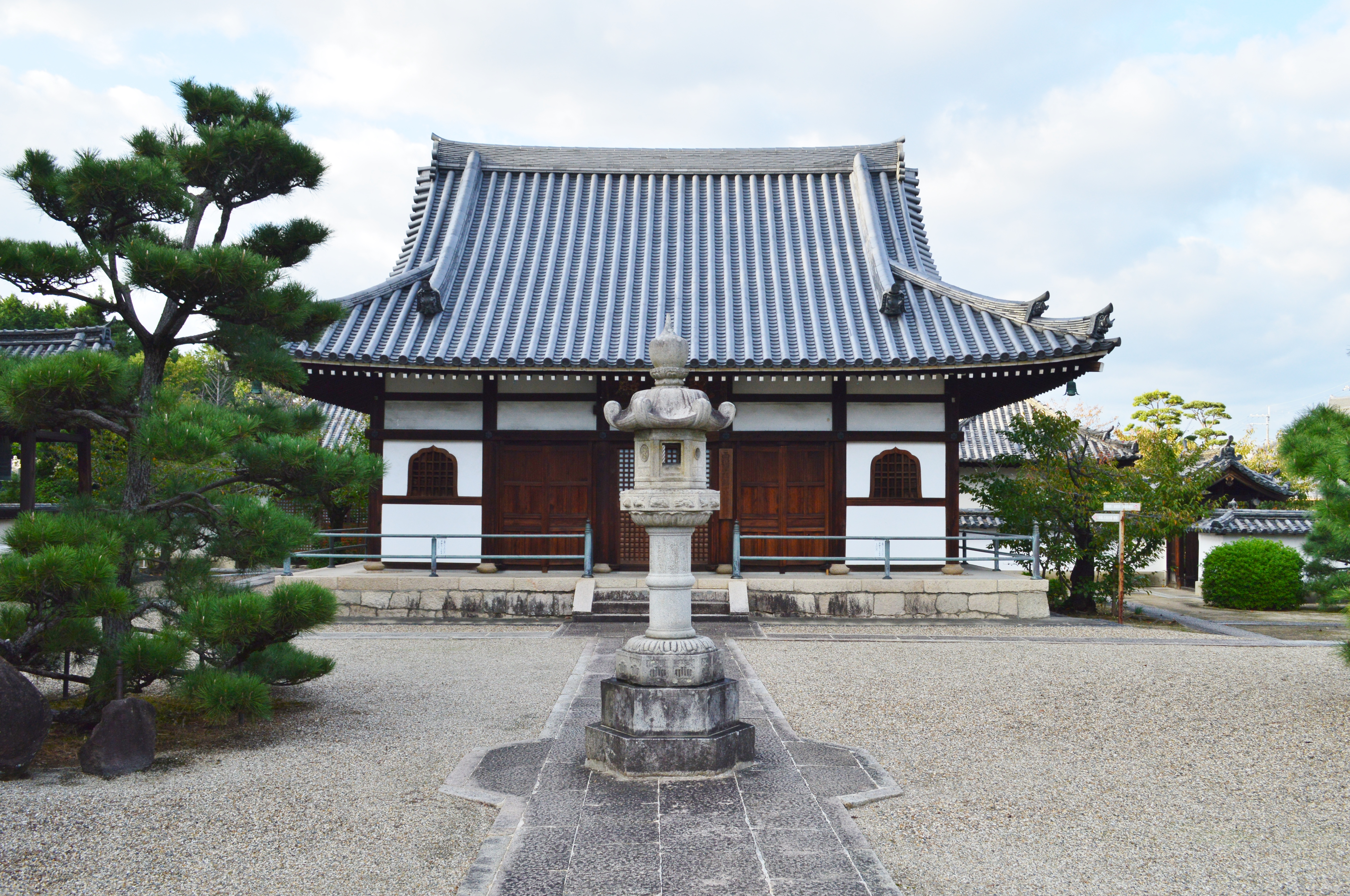
- Yachū-ji Hondo

- Yachū-ji Yachū-ji (Japan)

Religion
- Affiliation: Buddhist
- Deity: Yakushi Nyōrai
- Rite: Kōyasan Shingon-shū
- Status: active

Location
- Location: 5-9-24 Nonoue, Habikino-shi, Osaka-fu
- Country: Japan
- Interactive map of Yachū-ji
- Coordinates: 34°33′33.53″N 135°35′31.11″E

Yachū-ji (野中寺) is a Buddhist temple located in the city of Habikino, Osaka Prefecture, Japan, belonging to the Kōyasan Shingon-shū branch of Shingon Buddhism. Its main image is a statue of Yakushi Nyorai. The temple is also popularly known as Naka-no-Taisi (中の太子) as it is located in between the temples of Eifuku-ji and Taiseishōgun-ji, which also claim a connection with Prince Shōtoku. The temple precincts are designated a National Historic Site

== History ==
According to tradition, this temple is one of the 48 built by Soga no Umako under the orders of Prince Shōtoku. However, according to an archaeological excavation, it appears that it was constructed around the first year of the Hakuchi (650 AD), or several decades after the death of both gentlemen. It was located on the Takeuchi Kaidō, the ancient highway connecting the capital of Asuka with the coast. From the cornerstones that remain in the precincts, a large-scale temple with a layout patterned after Hōryū-ji in Ikaruga existed from the Asuka period to the first half of the Nara period. he foundations of the Middle Gate, Main Hall, Pagoda and Lecture Hall and Cloister have been found. It is speculated that this temple had a connection with the Funa clan, a group of toraijin immigrants from the Korean kingdom of Baekje who had strong connections with Soga no Umako, and who had started to settle in this area at the end of the Kofun period.

The pagoda was destroyed by a fire during the wars of the Nanboku-chō period and it is uncertain how much of the temple survived. It appears to have been close to an abandoned temple by the early Edo Period. In 1661 it was revived by priest named Kakue from Yamashiro Province with the support of Sayama and Tannan Domains, only to burn down again during the Kyōhō era (1716-1735), with the exception of its Jizō-do. In 1724, Yanagisawa Yoshisato, the daimyō of Yamato Kōriyama Domain donated a new refectory and guest hall. The temple continued to rebuild through the end of the Edo period as a seminary for the Risshū sect. In the middle of the Meiji period, it changed its affiliation to the Kōyasan Shingon-shū.

The temple is located about a 15-minute walk from Fujiidera Station on the Kintetsu Minami Osaka Line.

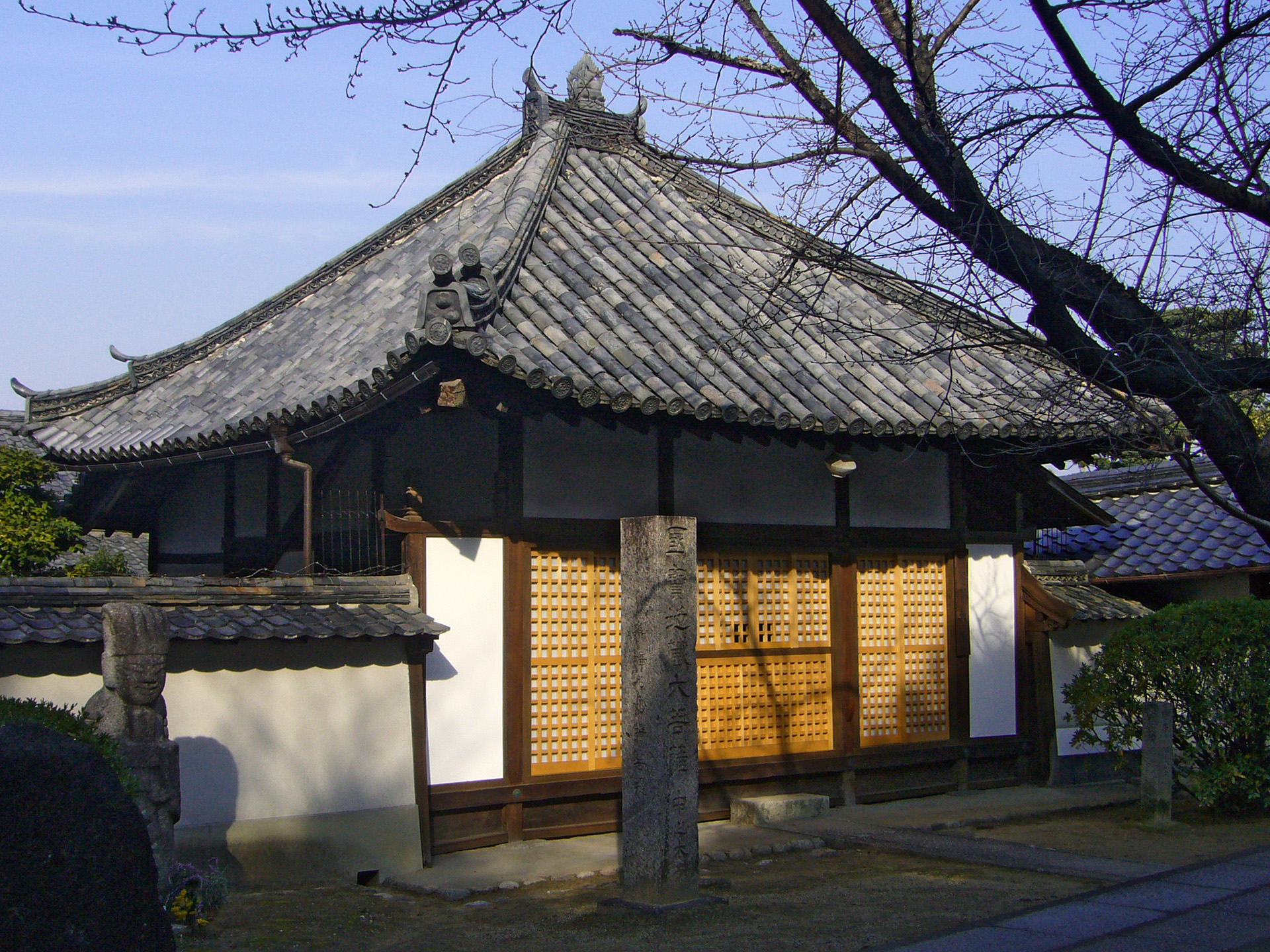
Jizō-dō

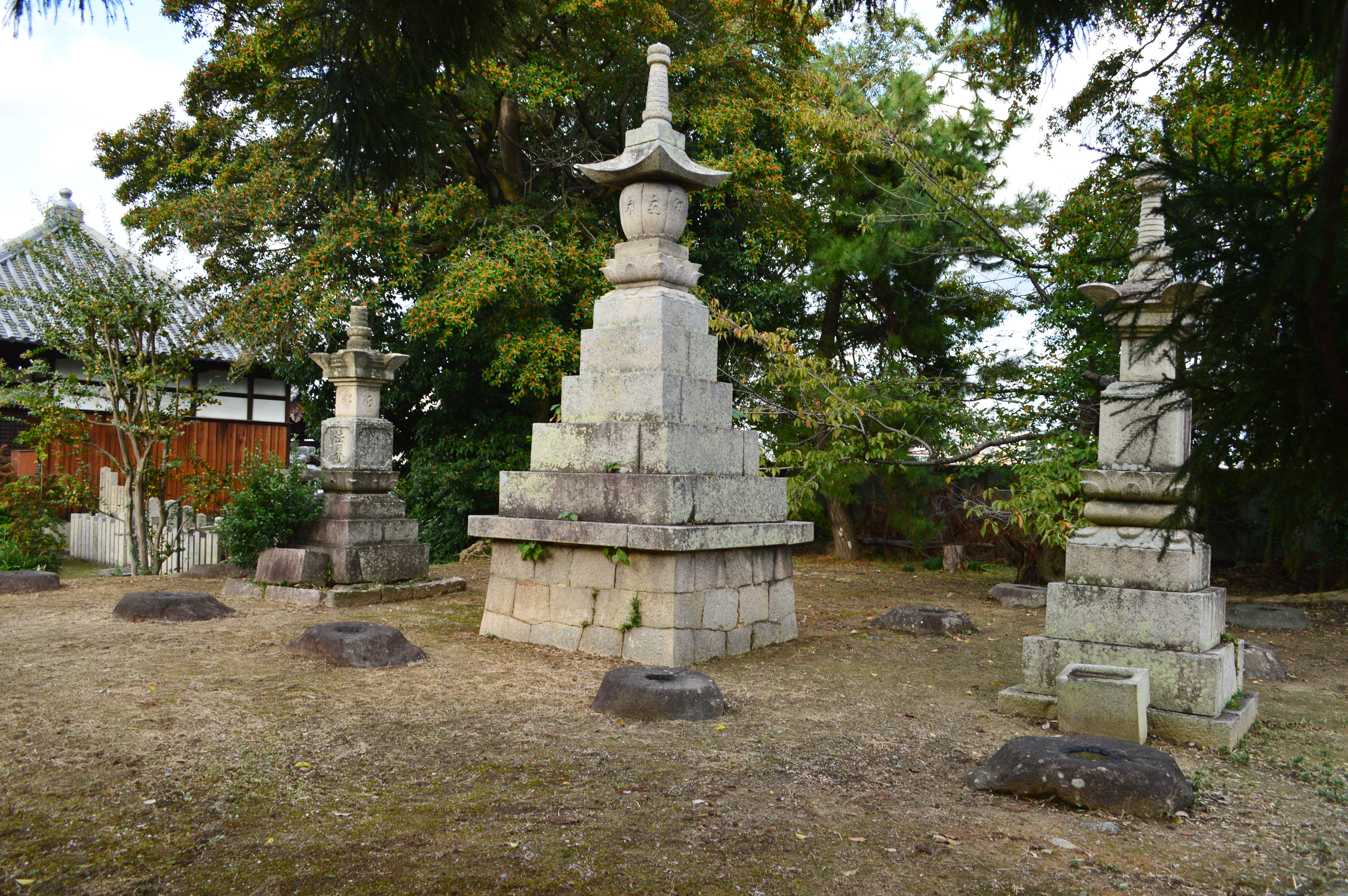
Site of Kondō

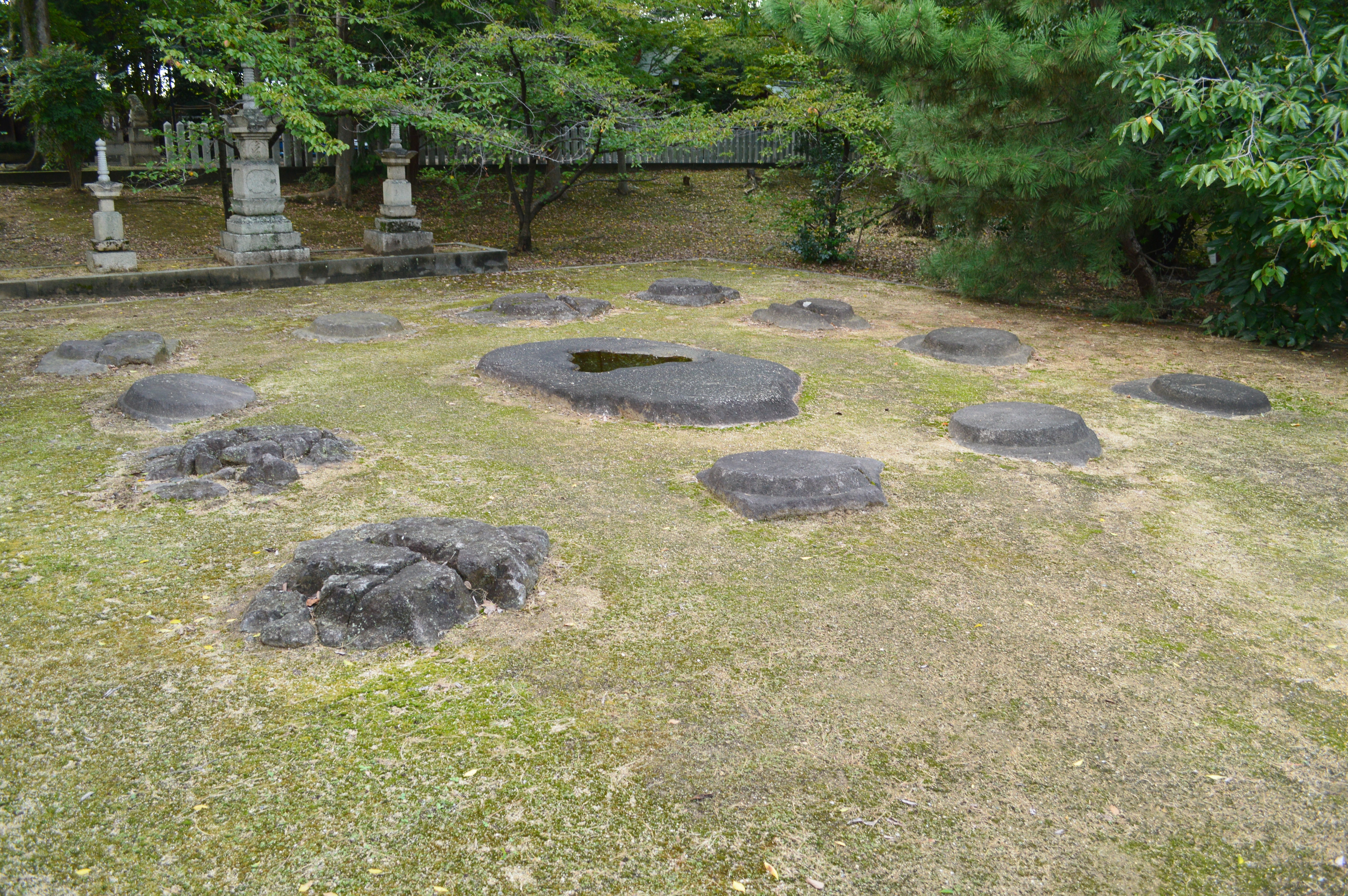
Site of Three-story Pagoda

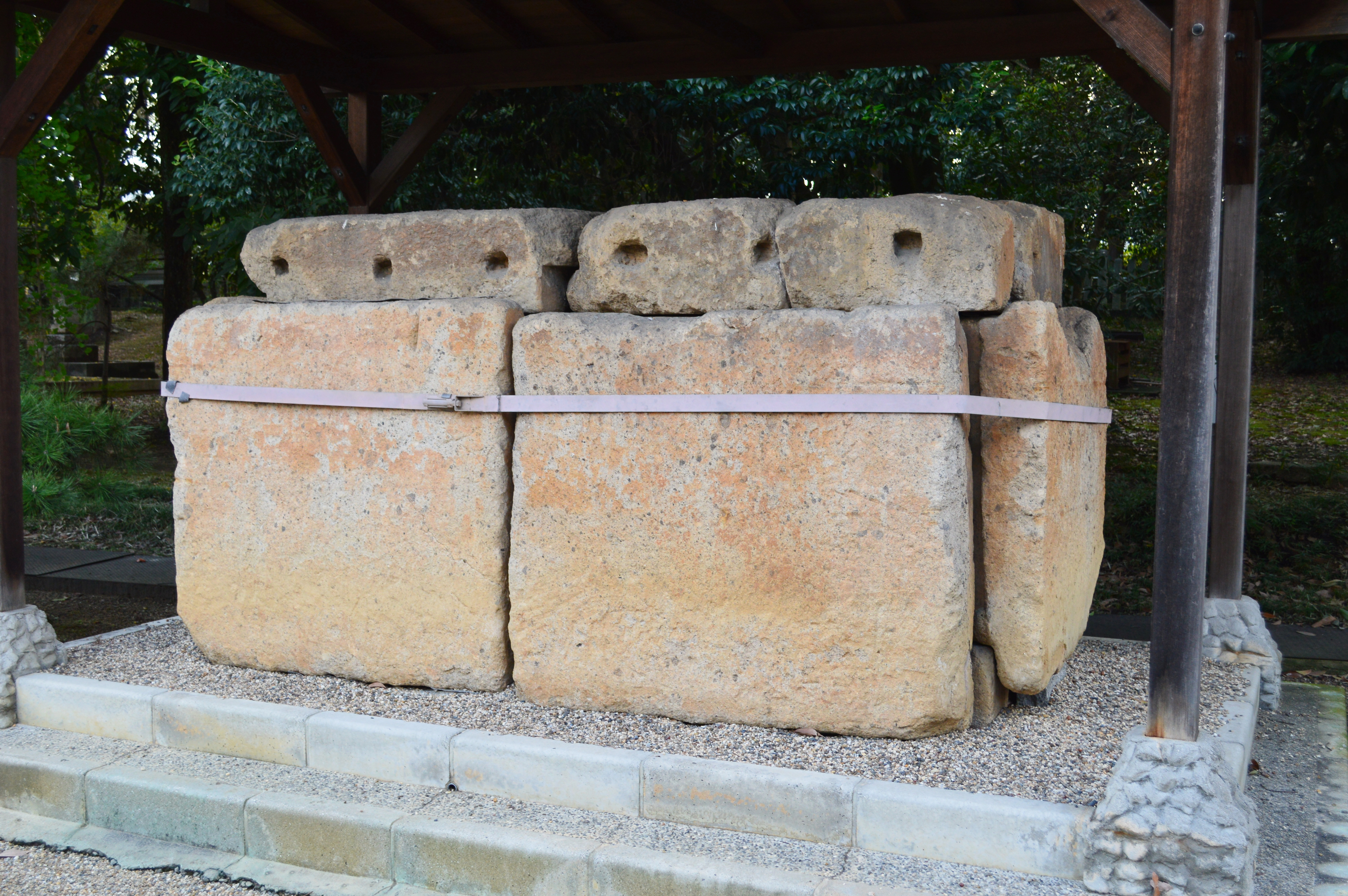
Hichinjo Ikenishi Kofun sarcophagus

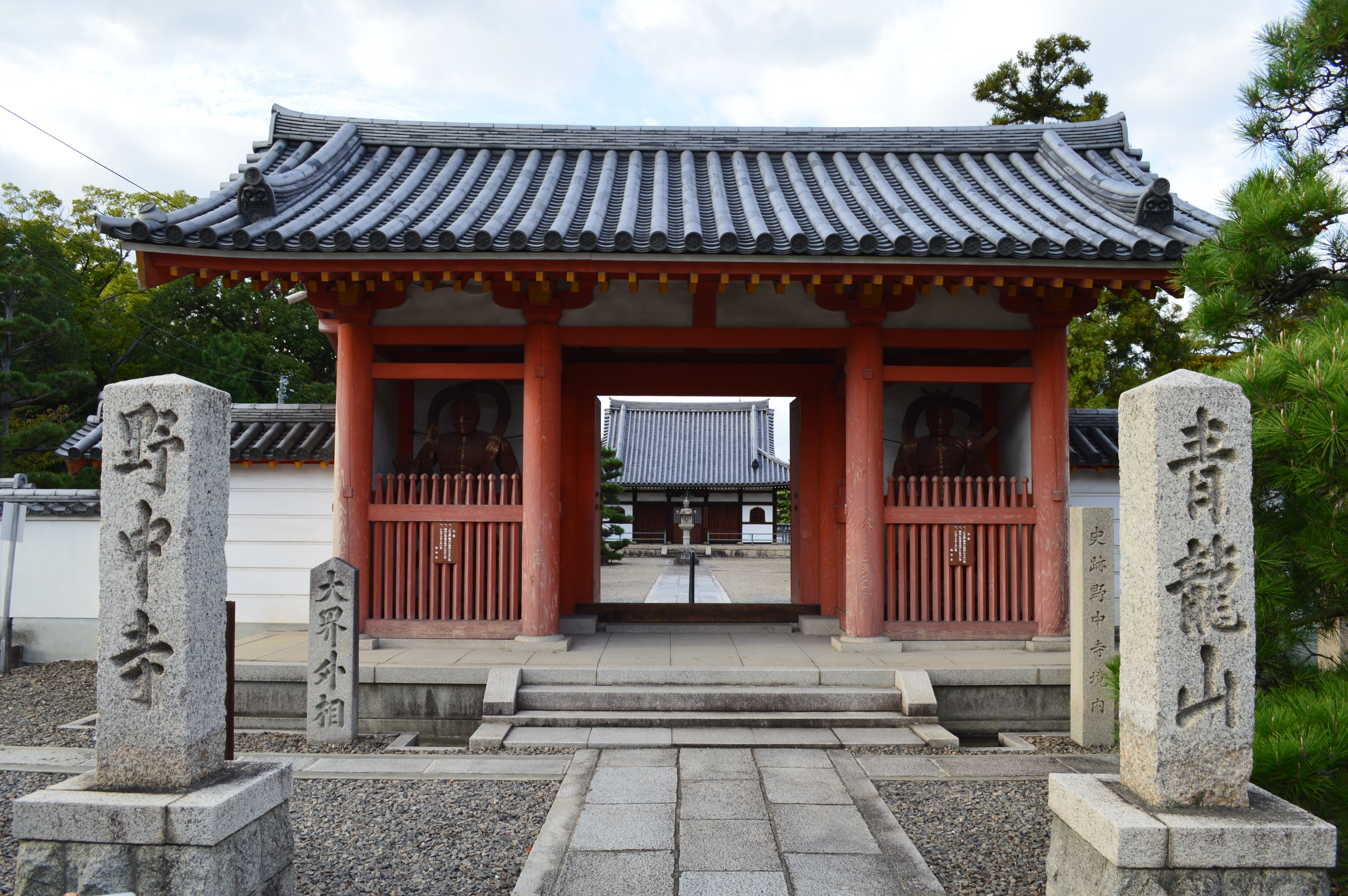
Sanmon

== Cultural Properties ==
- Jizō Bosatsu, standing, wooden, Heian period, Important Cultural Property
- Miroku Bosatsu, seated, gold-bronze, Hakuhō period, Important Cultural Property The statue was discovered in a warehouse at the temple in 1918, and is 18.5 cm tall. It has an inscription giving a date of 666 AD.

== See also ==
- List of Historic Sites of Japan (Osaka)
- Historical Sites of Prince Shōtoku
