= Genki =

Genki may refer to:

- Genki (company), a Japanese video game company
- Genki (era), a Japanese era name
- Genki (given name), a masculine Japanese given name
- Genki: An Integrated Course in Elementary Japanese, a Japanese language textbook
