= Robert Yellin =

American Japanese ceramics specialist

Robert Yellin is an American ceramics expert, writer, and gallery owner who specializes in Japanese ceramics. Yellin has lived in Japan since 1984, and owns the Robert Yellin Yakimono Gallery in Kyoto. He also operates an informational website and online gallery of Japanese ceramic art, e-yakimono.net. Yellin previously wrote the "Ceramic Scene" column for The Japan Times for 10 years. He has also previously written for Daruma Magazine, Asian Arts, Winds Magazine, and the quarterly Japanese ceramics magazine Honoho Geijutsu, among others. Yellin is the author of a book about sake utensils, published in Japanese as Yakimono Sanka (やきもの讃歌 ) in 1995, and in English in 2004 under the title Ode to Japanese Pottery: Sake Cups and Flasks.

In 2012 Yellin was invited to host a segment on Japanese artisans as part of a TV series created by Japan's Ministry of Foreign Affairs titled "Japan: Fascinating Diversity".

Since 2012, Yellin has been a guest lecturer on specialty Ceramics Tours conducted by Esprit Travel & Tours. He shares his knowledge and passion for Japanese ceramics through visits to artists' studios and museum throughout Japan.
