= Higashinotōin Street =

Street in Kyoto, Japan

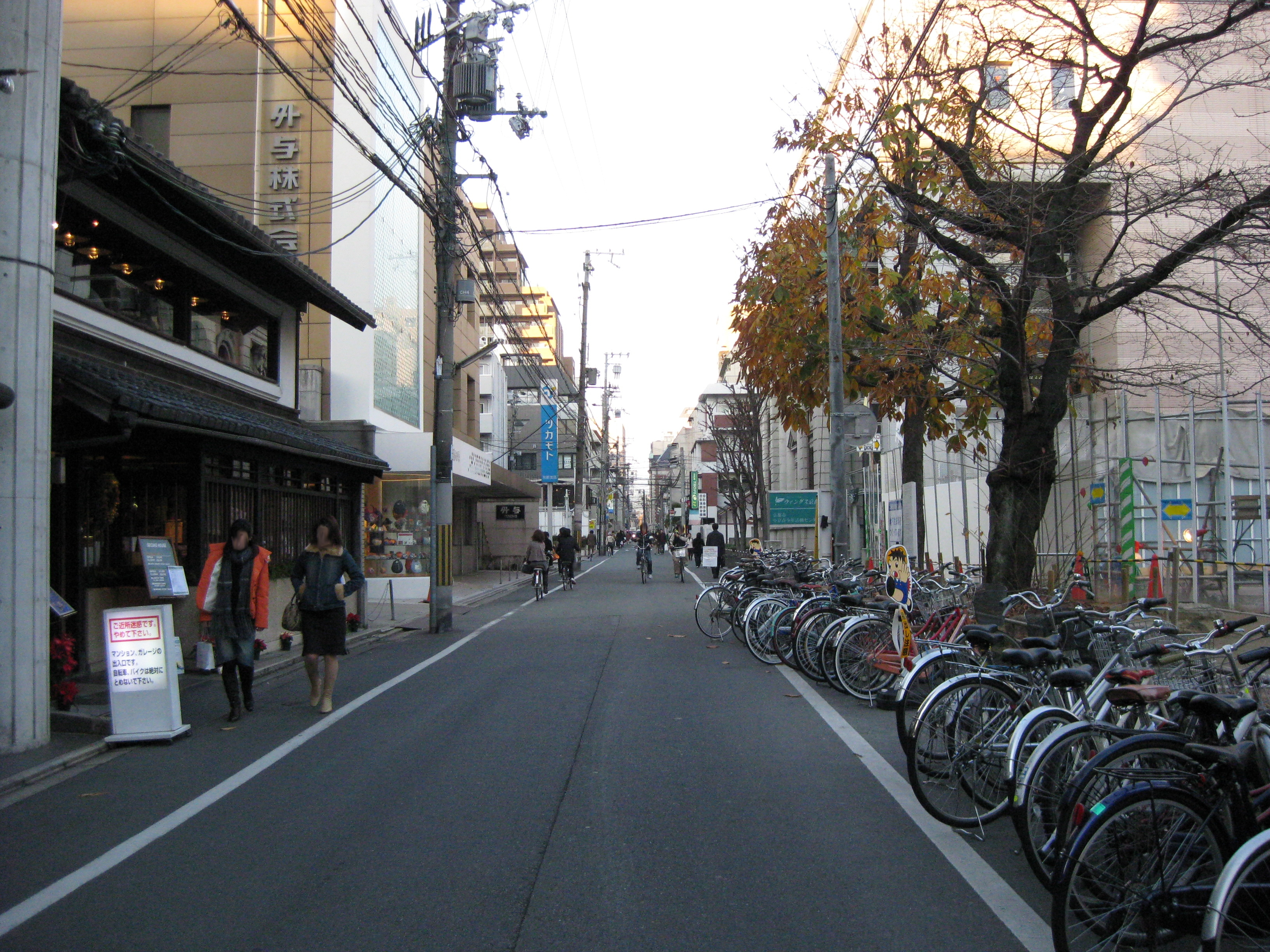
Higashinotōin Street, facing north from near the intersection with Takoyakushi Street.

Higashinotōin Street (東洞院通 ひがしのとういんどおり higashinotōin dōri) is a street running north to south in the city of Kyoto, Japan. It extends for approximately 3.5 km from Marutamachi Street (north) to Shiokōji Street (south).

== History ==
This street corresponds to the Higashinotōin Ōji Street of the Heian-kyō.

Between the years of 1716 and 1736, due to increased traffic, the street became Japan's first one-way street.

During the Meiji period, the Kiyamachi line of the Kyoto Electric Railway tram ran between Shiokōji and Nanajō Streets.

Currently, only the section between Nanajō Street and Shiokōji Street has two lanes; the rest is a narrow one-way street.

== Adjoining landmarks ==
- Kyoto Imperial Palace
- Nakagyō-ku Post Office
- Rokkaku-dō Temple
- Daimaru Kyoto Store
