= Dharma (disambiguation) =

Dharma is a key concept with multiple meanings in Indian and other religions.

Dharma, or variants, may also refer to:

== Arts and entertainment ==
=== Fictional characters ===
- Dharma (character), a fictional character in DC Comics
- Dharma Finkelstein, in American TV sitcom Dharma & Greg
- Dharma Initiative, a fictional research project and organization featured in the television series Lost

=== Film ===
- Dharma (1973 film), a Hindi-language action film
- Dharma (1998 film), a Tamil-language action film
- Dharma (2004 film), a Kannada-language action film
- Dharm (film), a 2007 Hindi-language film
- Dharmaa, a 2010 Nepalese film

=== Music ===
- Dharma (Sebastián Yatra album), 2022
- Dharma, an album by Merzbow, 2001
- The Dharmas or Steadman, former British indie rock band
- "Dharma", a song by Headhunterz and KSHMR, 2016
- Dharma Records, a record label

== People ==
- Dharma, a name for the mother of Ashoka (c. 3rd century BCE)
- Buck Dharma (Donald Roeser, born 1947), American musician
- Vikram Dharma (R. N. Dharmaseelan, 1961–2006), Indian action choreographer
- John Lie (Indonesian Navy officer) (Jahja Daniel Dharma, 1911–1988)

== Other uses ==
- Dharma Productions, a Bollywood film company

== See also ==
- Darma (disambiguation)
- Daruma (disambiguation)
- Adharm (disambiguation)
- Bodhidharma, 6th century Buddhist monk
- Daruma doll, depicting Bodhidharma
- Dharmanatha, 15th Jain tirthankara
- Dharmathakur, a Hindu deity
