= Dōmyō-ji =

Buddhist temple and nunnery in Fujiidera, Osaka, Japan

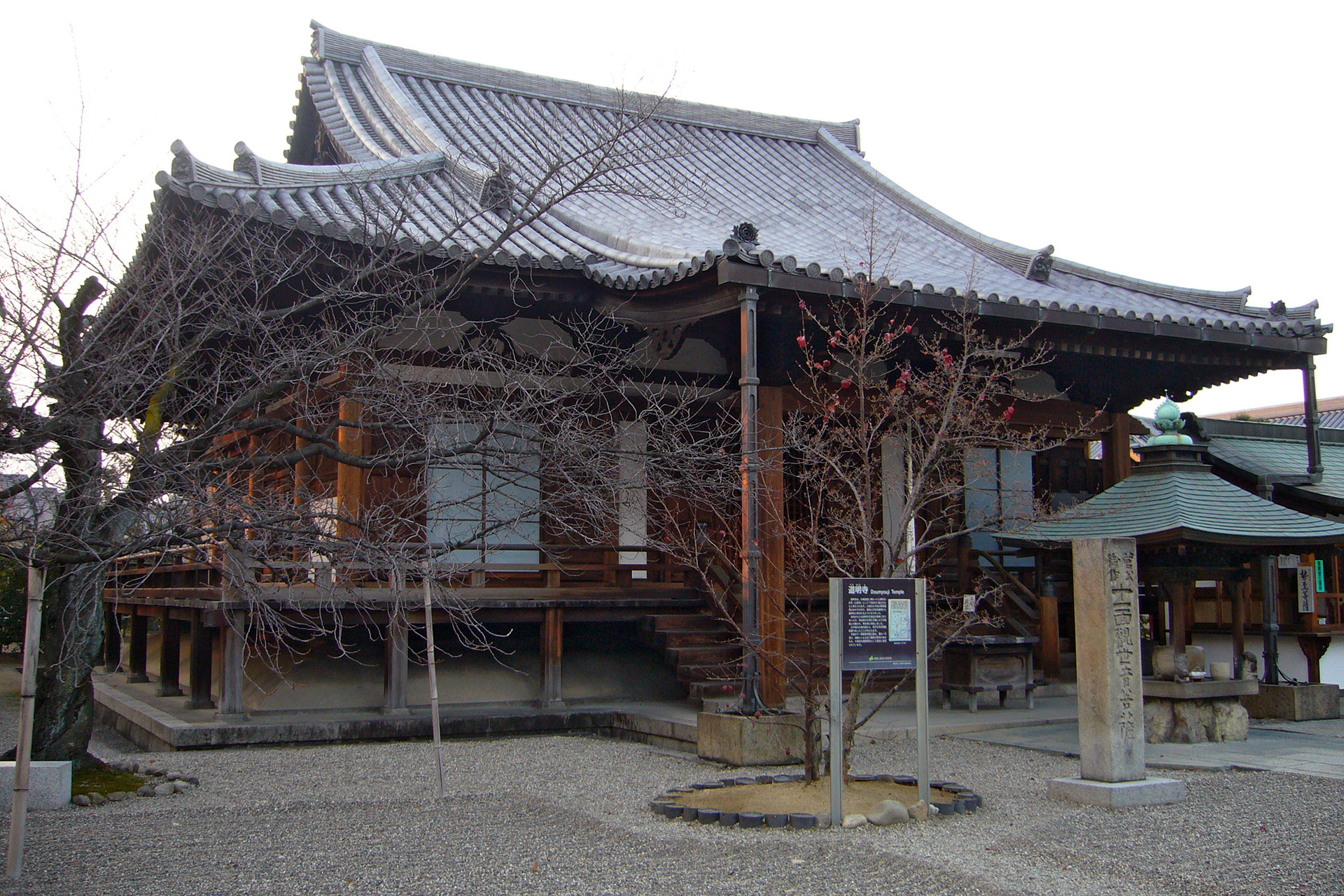
Main hall

Dōmyō-ji (道明寺) is a Buddhist temple and nunnery in Fujiidera, Osaka, Osaka Prefecture, Japan. It was founded in the sixth century, and is affiliated with Shingon Buddhism.

== In the area ==
- The main hall was rebuilt in 1919.
- Daishido
- Gomado
- Eastern gate
- Kuri
- Garden
- The foundation stones of the ruins of the five-story pagoda remain.

== See also ==
- Historical Sites of Prince Shōtoku
- List of National Treasures of Japan (sculptures)
