= Rokkaku-dō =

Buddhist temple in Nakagyo-ku, Kyoto, Japan

Chōhō-ji
- 頂法寺
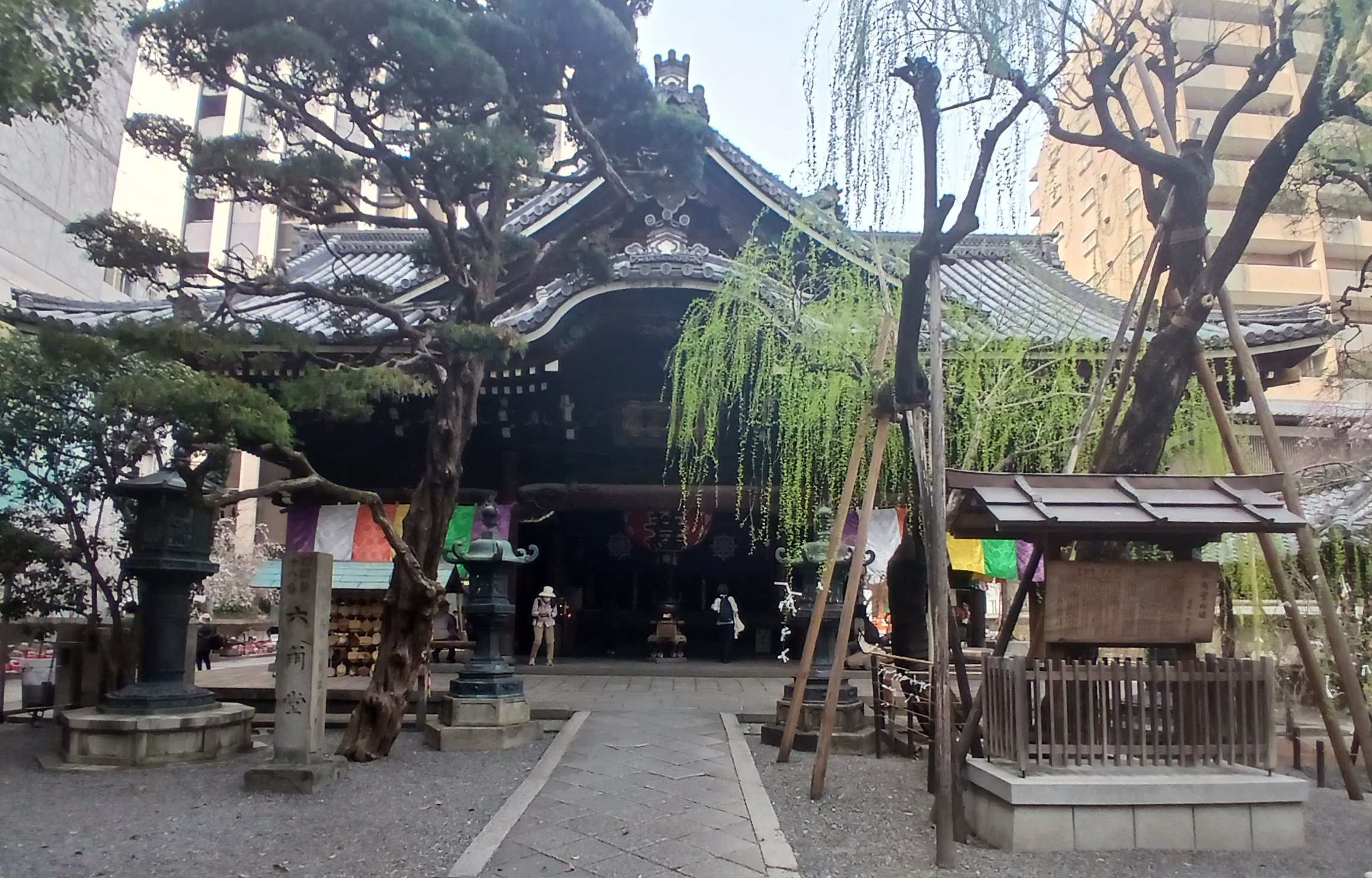
- Rokkaku-dō

- Location within Kyoto Prefecture Location within Japan

Religion
- Affiliation: Buddhist
- Deity: Nyōirin Kannon
- Rite: Tendai
- Status: functional

Location
- Location: 248 Donomaechō, Nishiiri, Higashinotoin, Nakagyo-ku, Kyoto-shi, Kyoto-fu 604-8134
- Coordinates: 35°0′27.58″N 135°45′36.85″E

Architecture
- Founder: c. Prince Shōtoku
- Completed: c.587

Website
- Official website
- National Important Cultural Property

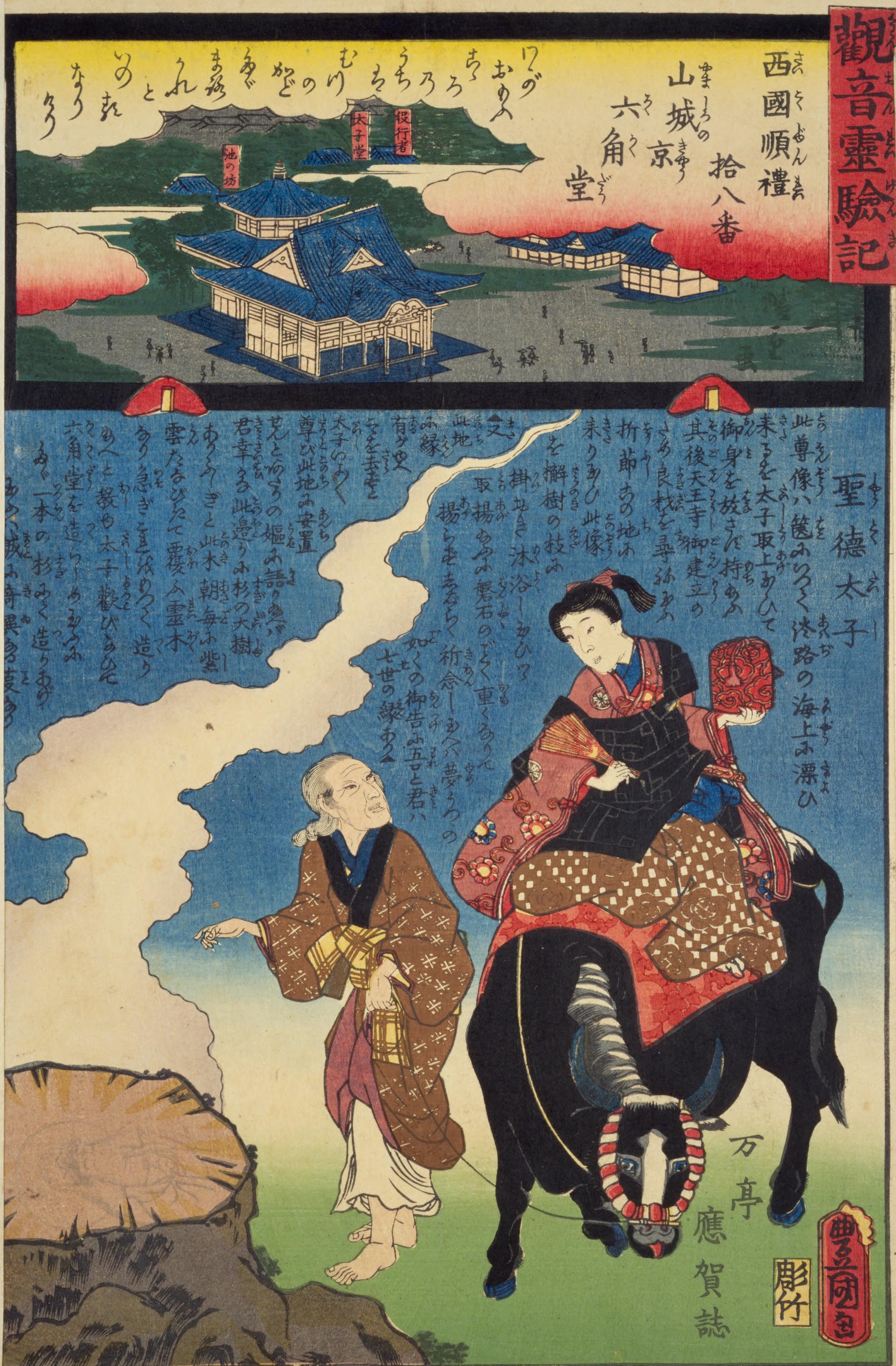
from the picture album "Kannon Reigen ki"

Prince Shōtoku at the Rokkaku-dō. Scene from the Illustrated Biography of Prince Shōtoku (聖徳太子絵伝), Muromachi period

Chōhō-ji (頂法寺) is a Buddhist temple located in the Rokkaku-dori Higashinotoin Nishinido-mae-chō neighborhood of Nakagyō-ku, Kyoto, Japan. It belongs to the Tendai sect of Japanese Buddhism and its honzon is a hibutsu statue of Nyōirin Kannon. The statue is never displayed to the public and is not a designated cultural property, but by tradition it is a three-inch gilt-bronze image of Nyōirin Kannon that was donated by Taira no Tokuko in 1178. The temple's full name is Shiun-san Chōhō-ji (紫雲山 頂法寺); however, the temple is far more commonly known by the name of its hexagonal main hall, the Rokkaku-dō (六角堂). The temple is the 18th stop on the Saigoku Kannon Pilgrimage route.

== Overview ==
The founding of this temple is uncertain. The legend of the temple's founding appears in the Daigo-ji version of the "Shōji Engishu" (Collection of Temple Legends) and the "Iroha Jiruishō", as well as in the "Rokkaku-dō Chōhō-ji Engi", which is owned by the temple, and the early modern publication "Rakuyo Rokkakudō Ryaku Engi." According to these legends, during the reign of Emperor Bidatsu, a Nyōirin Kannon statue made of gold washed ashore at Iwaya Bay in Awaji Province. This statue was worshipped by Prince Shōtoku during his Buddhist training in China in his previous life, and the prince made this Kannon statue his guardian deity. This later became the principal image of this temple. At the age of 16, Prince Shōtoku was on the offensive against the anti-Buddhist Mononobe no Moriya and prayed to the guardian Buddha for victory, saying, "If the battle is successful, I will build Shitennō-ji in gratitude." In 587 (the second year of the reign of Emperor Yōmei), he visited the area with Ono no Imoko to seek timber for the construction of a temple. While bathing in a pond, Prince Shōtoku placed his personal Buddha statue among the branches of a nearby tree. However, the statue became heavy and became immobile. The statue emitted a radiant light and declared that it had protected Prince Shōtoku for seven lifetimes, but that from now on it would like to remain in this place and liberate all living beings. During the night he dreamed that Nyoirin Kannon appeared to him saying, "With this amulet I have given you, I have protected many generations but now I wish to remain in this place. You must build a six-sided temple and enshrine me within this temple. Many people will come here and be healed." Prince Shōtoku decided to build a temple here. An old man from the east (the guardian deity Karasaki Myōjin) told him the location of a sacred cedar tree with purple clouds floating above it. The timber was used to build a hexagonal hall, marking the beginning of the temple. According to the Genkō Shakusho, during the construction of Heian-kyō, the Rokkaku-dō was in the way of the planned road and was about to be demolished. However, black clouds appeared and the building was moved northward by approximately 15 meters.

These legends date the Rokkaku-dō's construction to the Asuka period, but archaeological excavations conducted from 1974 to the following year found no remains earlier than the late 10th century. Furthermore, the Rokkaku-dō first appeared in historical documents from the early 11th century. The earliest example of the place name "Rokkakukōji" appears in the entry for March 21, 1017, in Fujiwara no Michinaga's diary, Midō Kanpakuki. The name Rokkaku-dō also appears in the Shōyuki (the diary of Fujiwara no Sanesuke) and other sources. In the Imayō section of the "Ryōjin Hishō," Rokkaku-dō is praised as "a temple where Kannon's signs can be seen," and along with Kiyomizu-dera, Ishiyama-dera, and Hase-dera, "Rokkaku-dō can be seen up close." These observations indicate that Rokkaku-dō was a well-known Kannon sacred site in the late Heian period.

In 1201, during the first year of the Kennin era in the early Kamakura period, 29-year-old Han'en (later known as Shinran), a monk at Enryaku-ji, spent 100 days in seclusion at Rokkaku-dō. On the 95th day, in a daze, vision of Prince Shōtoku (regarded as an incarnation of Avalokiteśvara), who directed him to another monk, Hōnen, who converted him to the exclusive nembutsu practice. Shinran became the founder of the Jōdo Shinshū sect of Buddhism. During the Muromachi period, a lottery ceremony to determine the order of the floats in the Gion Festival procession began at the temple, and this continued until the end of the Edo period. During the Great Yamashiro Famine of 1461, the eighth shōgun, Ashikaga Yoshimasa, built a relief hut in front of the temple and ordered the Ji sect monk Gan'ami to provide rice porridge to the impoverished people who had fled to the capital. Because the temple site was in the center of Shimogyō, the temple served as a town hall, playing a central role in the daily life and culture of the townspeople, especially after the Ōnin War. When Shimogyō faced a crisis, the temple's bell would ring. It also served as a gathering place for troops preparing for battles such as the Tenbun-Hokke Rebellion, and as a meeting place for representatives of the Shimogyō town groups.

In the early modern period, the "Kyoto Goyakusho Daigyo Memo" (General Memorandum for the Kyoto Government Office) recorded that the temple held one koku of land. The temple also had sub-temples such as Tamon-in, Fudō-in, Jushin-in, and Aizen-in within its grounds, but none survive. As a Kannon temple, it attracted the faith of the common people. In the early modern period, a town developed around the temple, with numerous inns for pilgrims. It became one of the leading lodging towns in Kyoto. While the temple suffered 18 confirmed disasters up until the end of the Edo period, including a fire in 1125, it was rebuilt each time. The current main hall was rebuilt in 1877.

== Legends ==
In 1204, when he was 29 years old, Shinran Shonin (1173–1263) decided to spend 100 days in seclusion or privacy at Rokkaku-do. On the 95th day, Kannon appeared to Shinran in a dream and told him to forgo his vow of celibacy and marry. She told him that she would appear to him in the form of a woman and they would become lovers and enter into Amida's Paradise. She then told him that he should seek out Honen, his teacher, and found a new order of Buddhism that encouraged clerical marriage and family life. A small hexagonal hall at Rokkaku-do features two statues of Shinran – one seated in a dream trance and one standing with walking staff and beads.

== Ikenobo ==
The temple's main hall, the Rokkaku-dō, is a sub-temple within Chōhō-ji, and has been managed and maintained by the Ikenobō clan for generations. The origin of Japanese flower arranging is said to be when Ono no Imoko, who became a monk at the command of Prince Shōtoku, offered flowers before the Buddha. The temple was called "Ikenobō" because the temple was located on the edge of a pond. However, while the aforementioned legends mention that the temple was named "Ikenobō" after the pond where Prince Shōtoku bathed, and that Ono no Imoko was appointed head priest, they make no mention of Imoko's connection to flower arranging. As far as historical sources are concerned, it is only in the early modern period that Ono no Imoko has been recognized as the founder of flower arranging. As the temple's abbots, Ikenobō monks were required to offer flowers to the temple's principal image, the Nyōirin Kannon statue, and 15th-century records indicate that they were renowned for their exceptional flower arranging skills. During the Bunmei era (1469-1486), the 12th head of the Ikenobō school, Senkei, was known as a master of standing flower arrangement, and this gave rise to the Ikenobō style of standing flower arrangement. During the Tenbun era (1532-1555), the 13th head of the Ikenobō school, Sen'o, was frequently invited to the Imperial Court to arrange flowers, and he compiled the "Ikenobo Sen'o Kuden," which was the first to comprehensively systematize the theory and techniques of standing flower arrangement. Currently, the Ikenobō Kaikan, the headquarters building of the Ikenobō school of flower arrangement, is located here, and the Ikebana Museum is on the third floor.

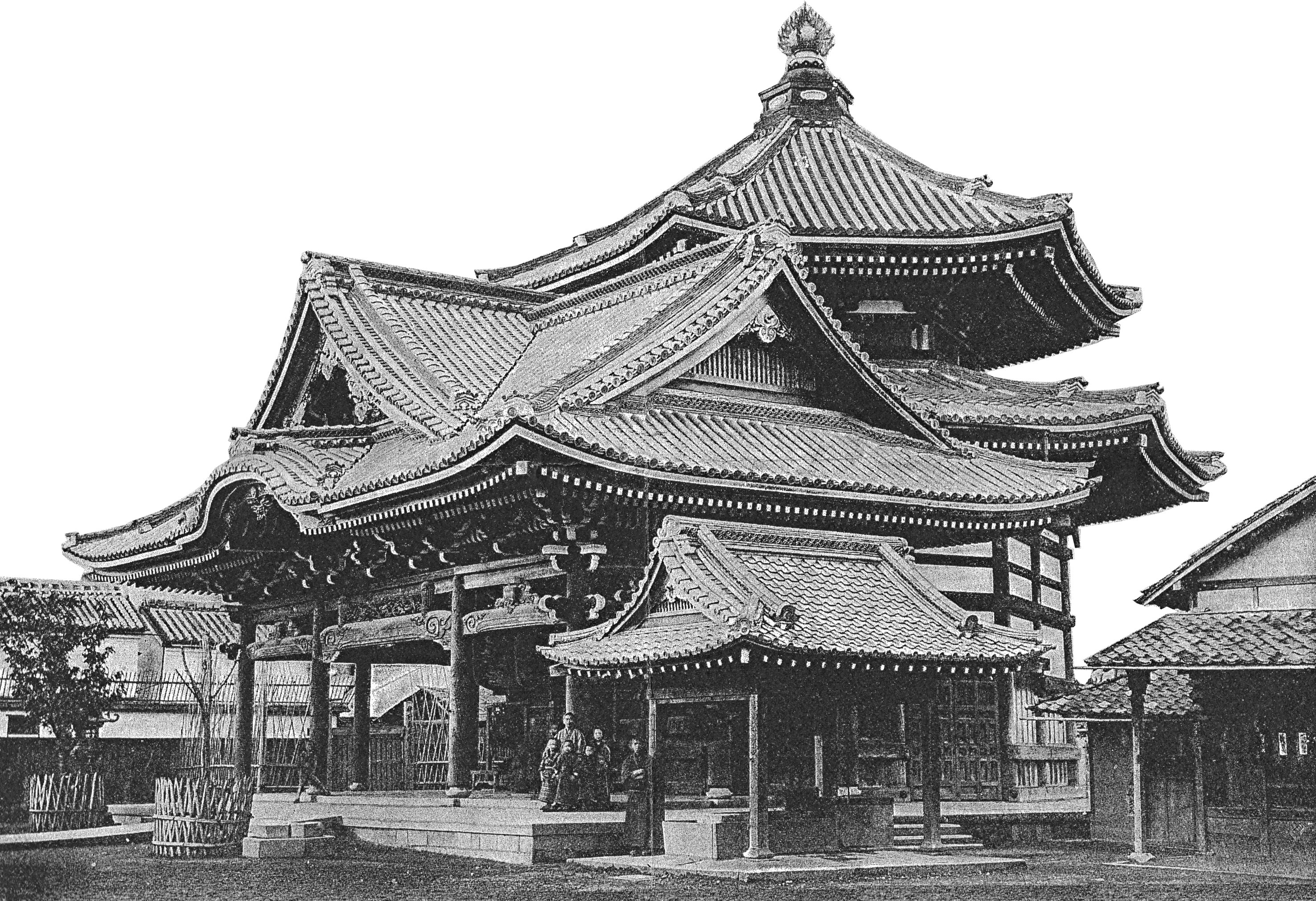
Rokkaku-dō in 1913

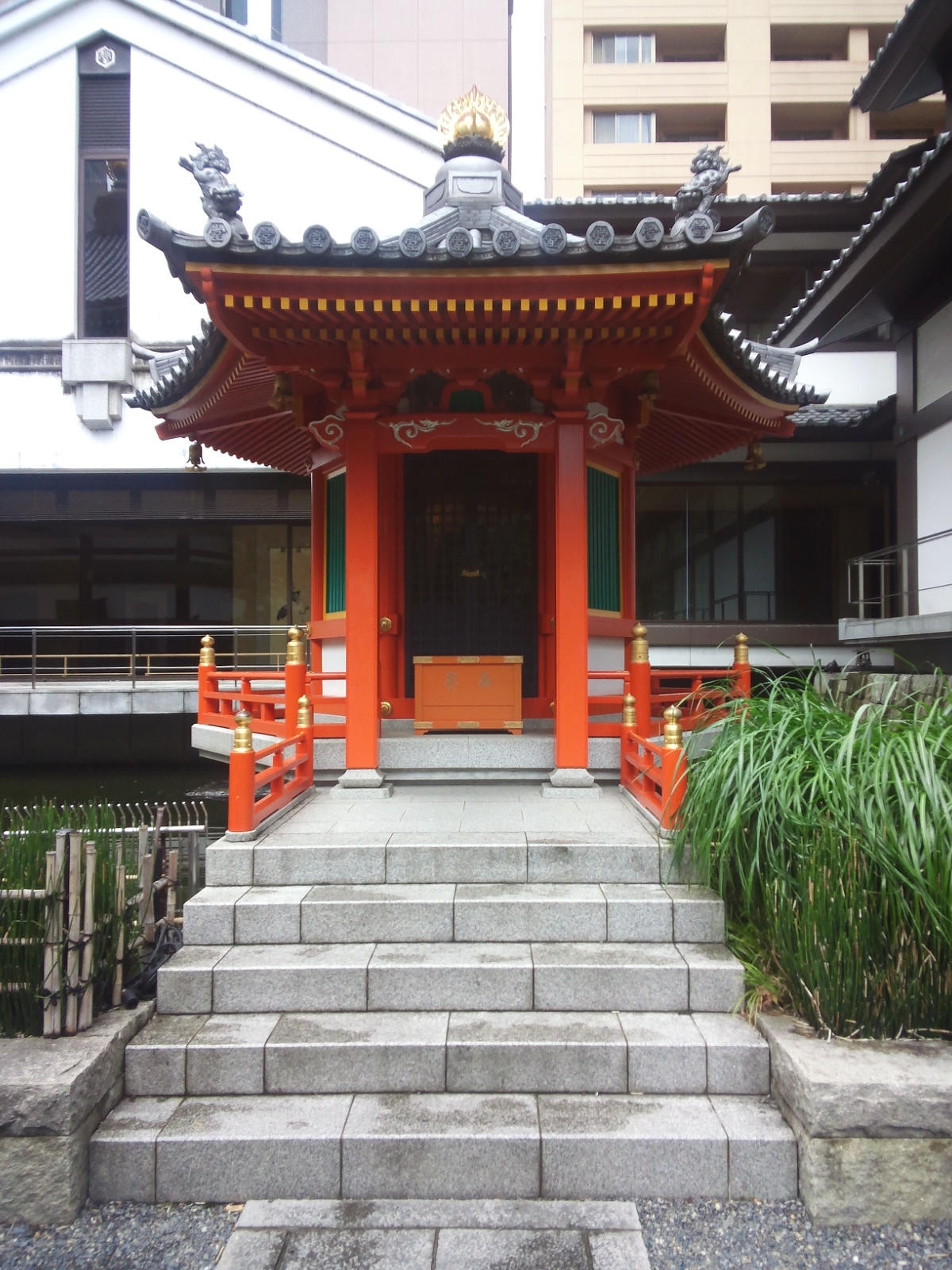
Taishi-dō

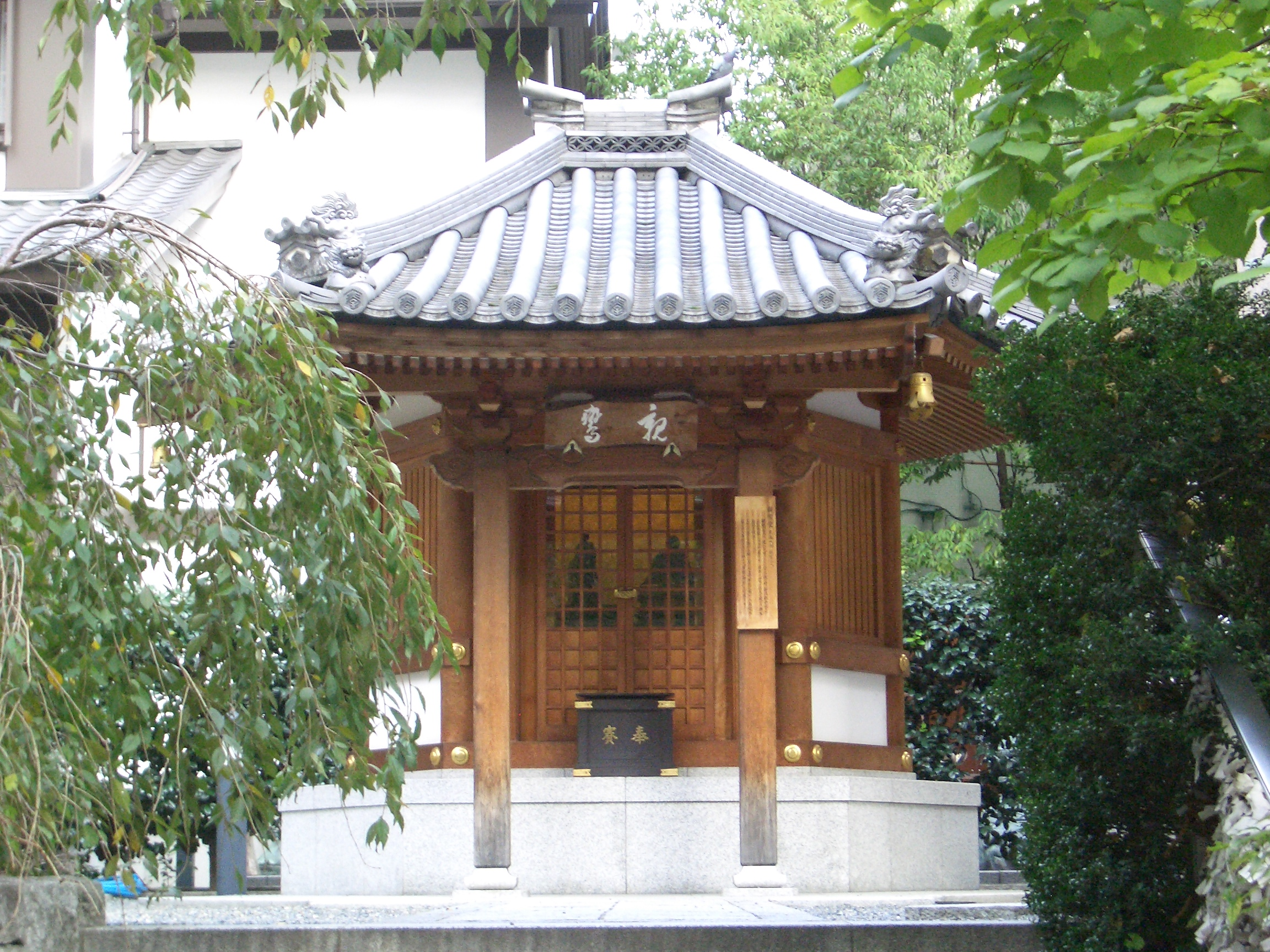
Shinran-dō

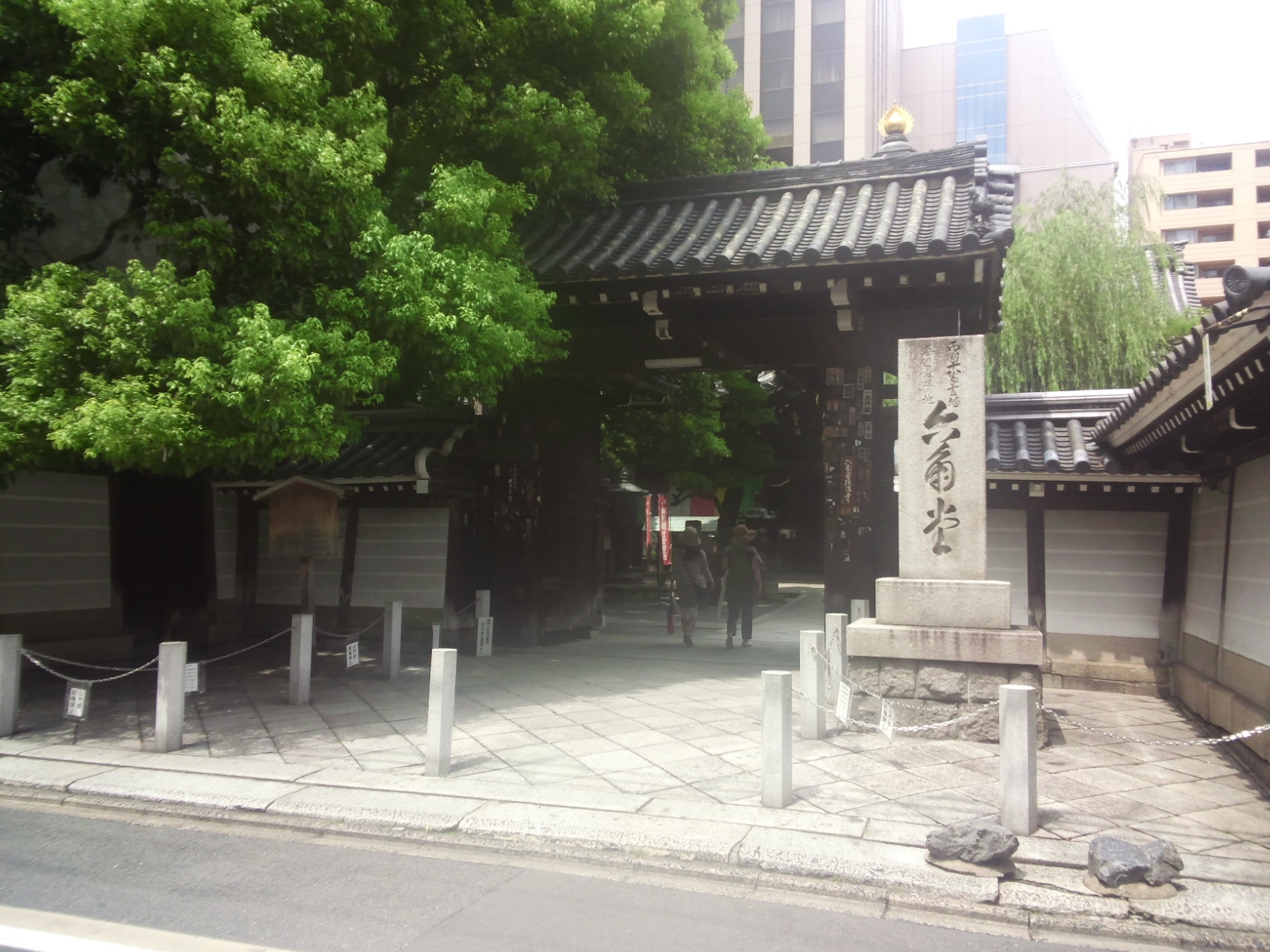
Entry

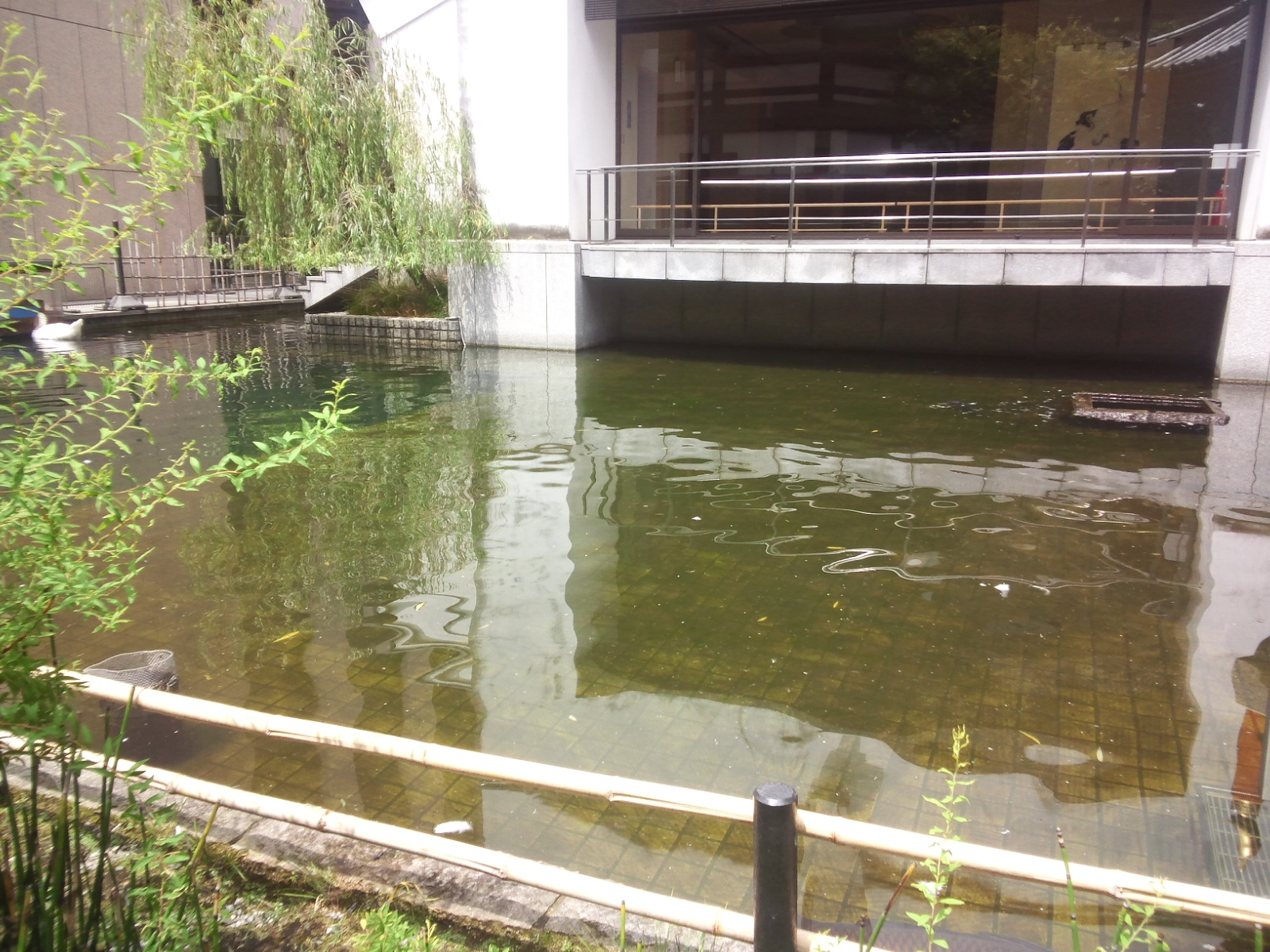
Remnant of pond where Prince Shōtoku bathed

The temple is approximately a 3-minute walk from Karasuma-Oike Station on the Kyoto Municipal Subway Karasuma Line and Tozai Line or a 7-minute walk from Karasuma Station on the Hankyu Kyoto Main Line.

== Cultural Properties ==
=== National Important Cultural Properties ===
- Wooden statue of standing Bishamon-ten (木造毘沙門天立像), Heian period; 102-cm
- Ikenobo Senko Tachibana (池坊専好立花図), Edo period (1665-1672); 93 paintings

=== Kyoto City Designated Tangible Cultural Properties ===
- Hondō (本堂), Meiji period;
- Haidō (拝堂), Meiji period;
- Shōrō (鐘楼), Meiji period;

== See also ==
- Historical Sites of Prince Shōtoku
