= Sairin-ji =

Buddhist temple in Osaka Prefecture, Japan

Sairin-ji (西琳寺) is a Buddhist temple in Habikino, Osaka Prefecture, Japan. It is affiliated with Kōyasan Shingon-shū, and was founded during the sixth century.

== See also ==
- Historical Sites of Prince Shōtoku
