= Ono no Imoko =

6th/7th-century Japanese politician and diplomat

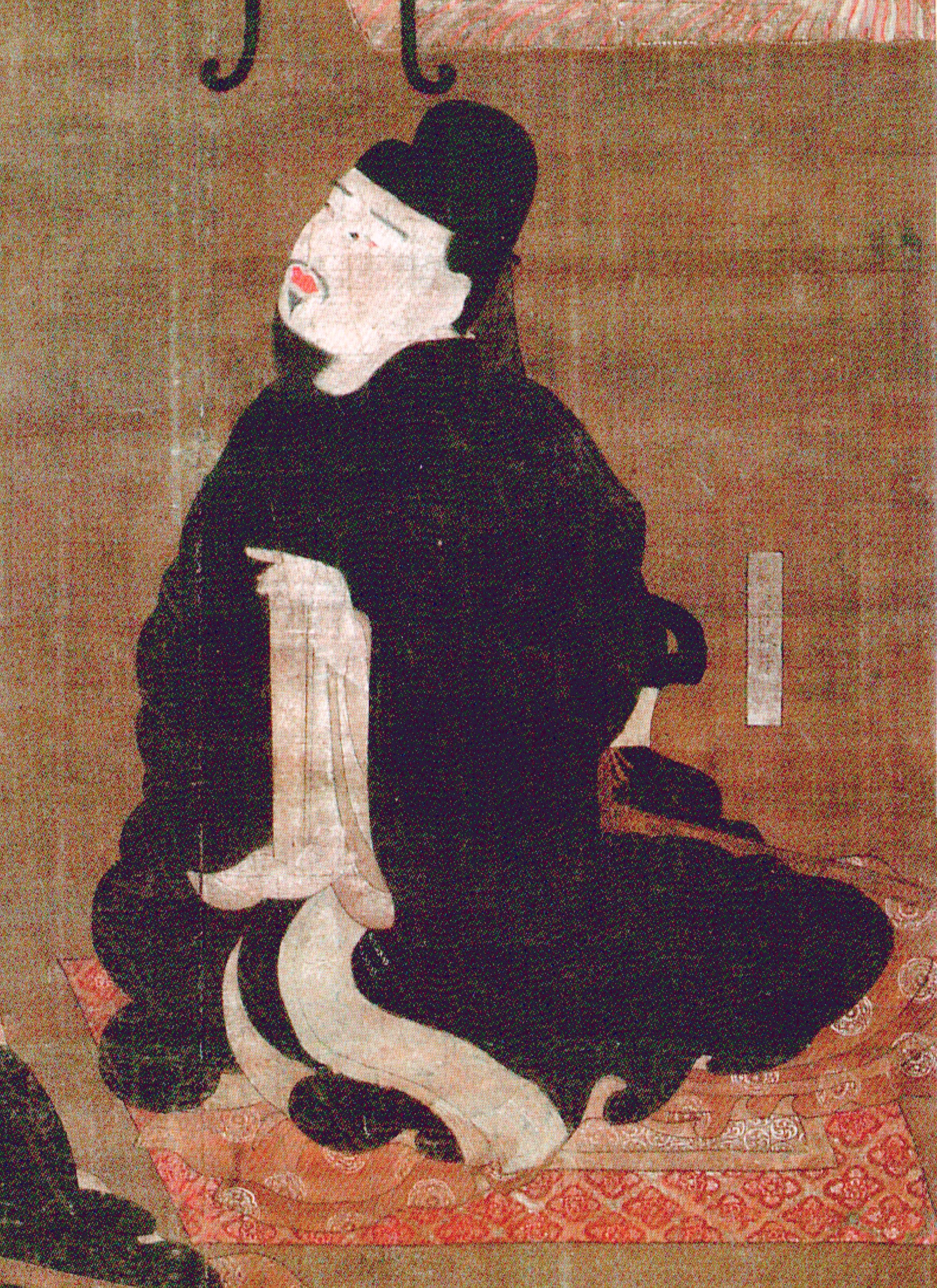
Portrait of Ono no Imoko, 13th century (Ikaruga-dera)

Ono no Imoko (小野 妹子; Japanese pronunciation: [o.no no (|) iꜜ.mo.ko]) was a Japanese politician and diplomat in the late 6th and early 7th century, during the Asuka period.

Ono was appointed by Empress Suiko as an official envoy (Kenzuishi) to the Sui court in 607 (imperial embassies to China), and he delivered the famous letter from Japan's Prince Shōtoku which began "The Son of Heaven where the sun rises [Japan], to the Son of Heaven where the sun sets [China], may good health be with you." Emperor Yang was angered at being addressed in this way, although it is not clear whether he was angered more by the insult of Sui being referred to as the land of the setting sun, or by the use of Son of Heaven to refer both to himself and the emperor of Japan, hinting that they were equals. China at this time considered other realms to be nothing more than barbarians before the Huaxia ideology and any lands on the Earth's surface not engaged at the Sinocentric tributary system were called Huàwài zhī dì (化外之地; "lands outside of civilization"), the Emperor of China was considered the only legitimate emperor of the entire world (all lands under heaven) and the Japanese use of the same Chinese characters for Emperor ("son of heaven") was a subversion of this principle and Chinese theocracy. Nevertheless, Emperor Yang was probably more interested in diplomatically distancing Japan from Goguryeo and getting support from Japan for being the other powerful kingdom besides Goguryeo in Northeast Asia than in matters of decorum, and despite the insult, he sent his own envoy, Pei Shiqing (裴世清), back to Japan with Ono. Goguryeo for years raided and assaulted Chinese borders, in an ill-fated attempt to subjugate the kingdom in the north, the Sui dynasty later collapsed due to unfavorable political opinion generated by the Goguryeo-Sui War and other causes.

Ono was then appointed envoy to Sui for a second time in the fall of 608 and accompanied Pei Shiqing on his return trip to China. Ono returned to Japan from his second mission in 609 and then largely disappeared from the historical record. Ono no Imoko is often cited as an example of an official who achieved promotion under the new meritorious Twelve Level Cap and Rank System implemented by Prince Shōtoku in 603. When Ono first appeared in the historical record and was appointed envoy to Sui, his rank was listed as Greater Propriety (5th rank), but he was later promoted to the top rank of Greater Virtue, largely due to his successful missions to the Sui court.

Ono no Imoko's family was notable for linguistics and scholarship, and the descendants of the family include waka poet Ono no Komachi, poet and scholar Ono no Takamura, and calligrapher Ono no Michikaze.
