= Adharm =

Adharm or Adharma may refer to:

- Adharma, the antonym of dharma in Hinduism
- Adharm (1992 film), an Indian film
- Adharm (2014 film), an Indian film by Ramesh Balakrishnan
- Adharmam, a 1994 Indian film by Ramesh Balakrishnan

== See also ==
- Dharma (disambiguation)
