= Darma =

Darma may refer to:

- Darma, Nepal, a rural municipality in Salyan district, Nepal
- Darma Valley in Uttarakhand, India
  - Darma River, which forms the valley
- Darmiya language, a Sino-Tibetan language spoken in India
- Darma, a character in the 2018 animated film Suicide Squad: Hell to Pay
- Darma, a character in the 2016 animated film Rock Dog

== See also ==
- Dharma (disambiguation)
- Drama (disambiguation)
