= The Japan Times =

English-language daily newspaper

- Sample page 1 of The Japan Times
- Type: Daily newspaper
- Format: Broadsheet
- Owner(s): News2u Holdings, Inc.
- Publisher: Takeharu Tsutsumi
- Editor: Hiroyasu Mizuno
- Staff writers: Approximately 130
- Founded: 22 March 1897; 129 years ago
- Political alignment: Centre
- Language: English
- Headquarters: Tokyo, Japan
- Circulation: 44,000
- ISSN: 0447-5763
- OCLC number: 21225620
- Website: www.japantimes.co.jp

The Japan Times is Japan's largest and oldest English-language daily newspaper. It is published by The Japan Times, Ltd. (株式会社ジャパンタイムズ, Kabushiki gaisha Japan Taimuzu), a subsidiary of News2u Holdings, Inc. It is headquartered in the Kioicho Building (紀尾井町ビル, Kioicho Biru) in Kioicho, Chiyoda, Tokyo.

== History ==
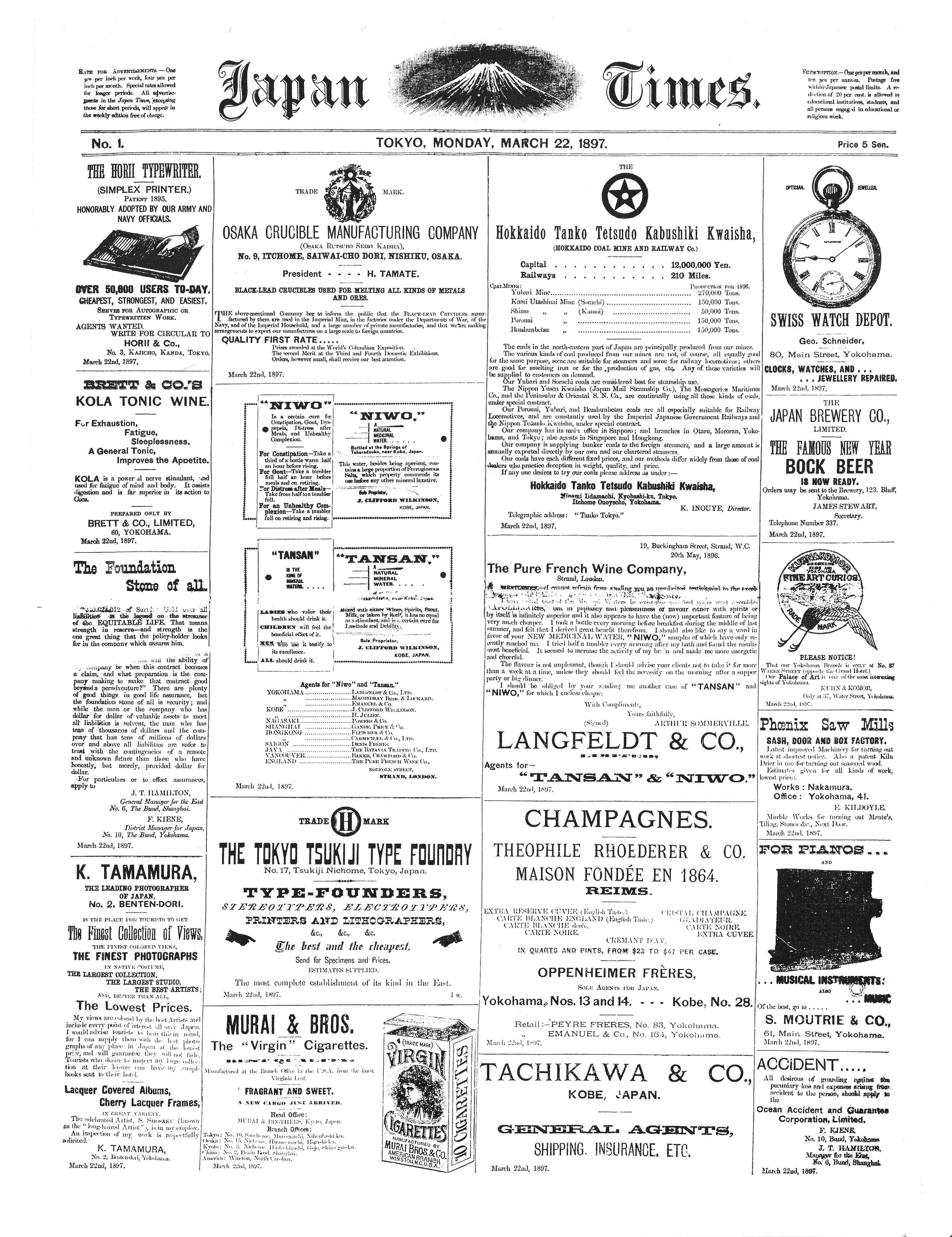
Front page of the first issue of Japan Times, 22 March 1897

The Japan Times was launched by Motosada Zumoto on 22 March 1897, with the goal of giving Japanese people an opportunity to read and discuss news and current events in English to help Japan participate in the international community.

In 1906, Zumoto was asked by Japanese Resident-General of Korea Itō Hirobumi to lead the English-language newspaper The Seoul Press. Zumoto closely tied the operations of the two newspapers, with subscriptions of The Seoul Press being sold in Japan by The Japan Times, and vice versa for Korea. Both papers wrote critically of Korean culture and civilization, and advocated for Japan's colonial control over the peninsula in order to civilize the Koreans.

The newspaper was independent of government control, but from 1931 onward, the paper's editors experienced mounting pressure from the Japanese government to submit to its policies. In 1933, the Japanese Ministry of Foreign Affairs appointed Hitoshi Ashida, former ministry official, as chief editor.

During World War II, the newspaper served as an outlet for Imperial Japanese government communication and editorial opinion. It was successively renamed The Japan Times and Mail (1918–1940) following its merger with The Japan Mail, The Japan Times and Advertiser (1940–1943) following its merger with The Japan Advertiser, and Nippon Times (1943–1956), before reverting to the Japan Times title in 1956. The temporary change to Nippon Times occurred during the ban on English language sentiment during World War II-era Japan.

Shintaro Fukushima (1907–1987) became president of The Japan Times in 1956. He sold some of the company's shares to Toshiaki Ogasawara (小笠原 敏晶), who was chairman of Nifco, a manufacturer of automotive fasteners. Fukushima renounced management rights in 1983, after which Nifco acquired control of The Japan Times and brought about staff changes and alterations to the company's traditions established in 1897. Ogasawara served as the chairman and publisher of The Japan Times until 2016, when his daughter Yukiko Ogasawara (小笠原 有輝子) succeeded him as chairman of the company. She had previously served as the company's president from 2006 to 2012, when she was replaced by career Japan Times staffer Takeharu Tsutsumi. Nifco sold The Japan Times to PR firm News2u Holdings, Inc. on 30 June 2017.

== Content ==
The Japan Times publishes The Japan Times, The Japan Times On Sunday, The Japan Times Alpha (a bilingual weekly), books in English and Japanese. Staff at The Japan Times are represented by two unions, one of which is Tozen.

=== Print ===
The Japan Times, Ltd. publishes three periodicals: The Japan Times, an English-language daily broadsheet; The Japan Times Weekly, an English-language weekly in tabloid form; and Shukan ST, also a weekly in tabloid form, targeted at Japanese readers learning the English language. Since 16 October 2013, The Japan Times has been printed and sold along with The New York Times International Edition.

=== Web ===
Printed stories from The Japan Times are archived online. The newspaper has a readers' forum and, since 2013, the website offers a section for readers' comments below articles. This came about during a redesign and redevelopment of the newspaper, using Responsive Web Design techniques so the site is optimised for all digital devices. The Japan Times has a social media presence on Twitter, and Facebook since 2007.

== Controversy ==
After being acquired by News2u, The Japan Times changed its editorial stance and contributor lineup as part of efforts to reduce criticism of the newspaper as an "anti-Japanese" outlet. In November 2018, it was announced in an editor's note that subsequent articles would use the term "wartime laborers" rather than "forced labor", and "comfort women" would be referred to as "women who worked in wartime brothels, including those who did so against their will, to provide sex to Japanese soldiers", instead of the previously used "women who were forced to provide sex for Japanese troops before and during World War II." The change drew immediate criticism from readers and employees, with particular concerns expressed over the paper's apparent alignment with the political positions of Prime Minister Shinzō Abe. In response to these criticisms, The Japan Times wrote in an article on 7 December 2018, "We must admit that the editorial note undermined the relationships of trust we have built with our readers, reporters and staff. I would like to apologize for the inconvenience", and denied criticism that it was in line with the intentions of the administration.

== Contributors ==
- Mark Brazil, Wild Watch nature columnist (1982–2015)
- Monty DiPietro, art critic
- John Gauntner, Nihonshu columnist
- John Gunning, sumo columnist
- Don Maloney
- Fume Miyatake, Women in Business columnist
- Jean Pearce, community columnist
- Ezra Pound, Italian correspondent
- Dreux Richard, African community, investigative
- Donald Richie, book, film critic
- Elyse Rogers, Women in Business columnist
- Mark Schilling, film critic
- Robbie Swinnerton, Tokyo Food File columnist
- Edward Seidensticker
- Fred Varcoe, sports editor
- Robert Yellin, Ceramic Scene columnist

== See also ==
- Asahi Shimbun
- International Herald Tribune
- Yomiuri Shimbun
- Genki: An Integrated Course in Elementary Japanese – Japanese language learning textbooks published by the newspaper
