= Historical sites of Prince Shōtoku =

Group of Buddhist temples in Japan

The Historical Sites of Prince Shōtoku (聖徳太子御遺跡霊場, Shōtoku taishi goiseki reijō) are a group of 28 Buddhist temples in Japan related to the life of Prince Shōtoku.

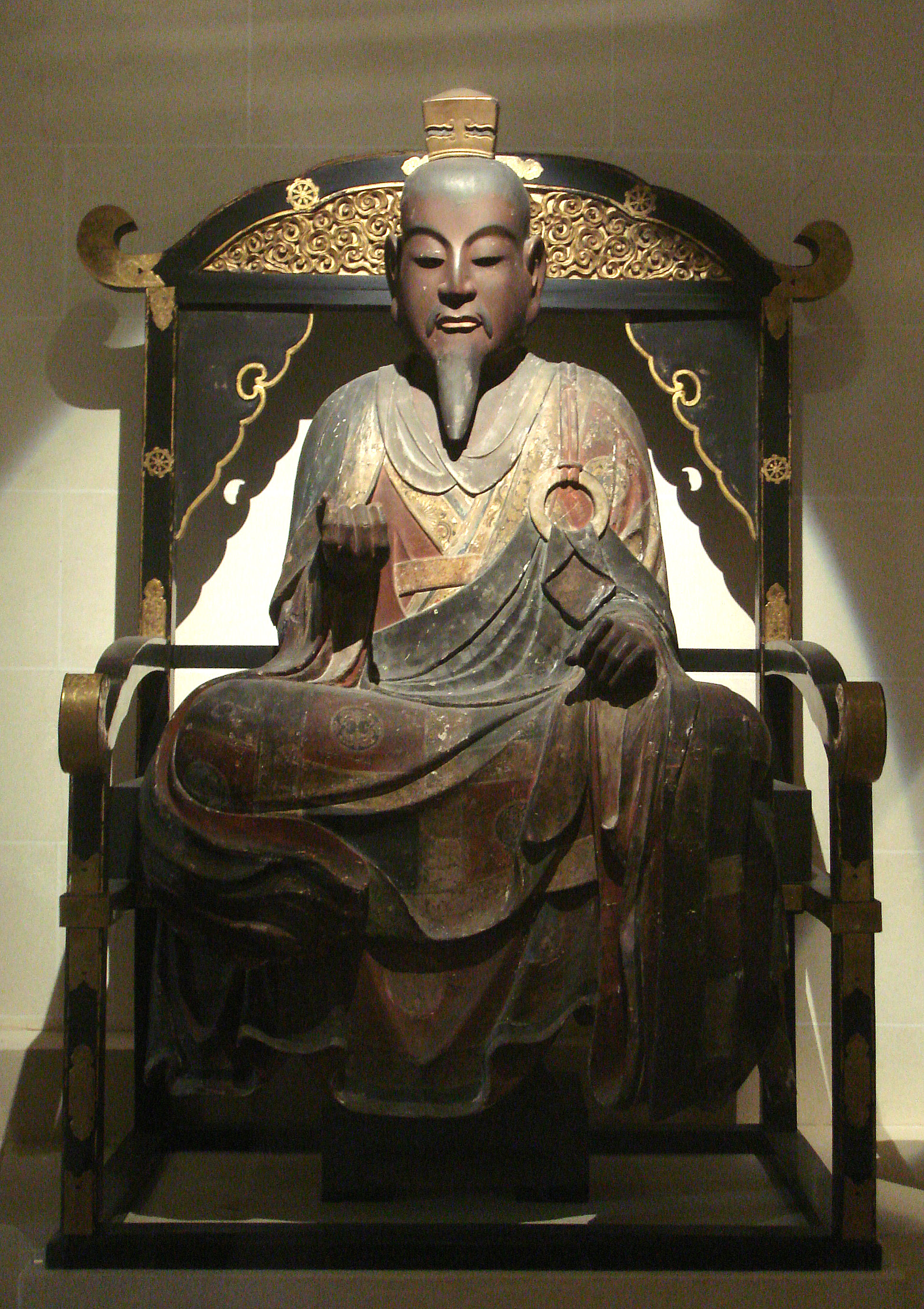
Sculpture of Prince Shōtoku, the first major sponsor of Buddhism in Japan

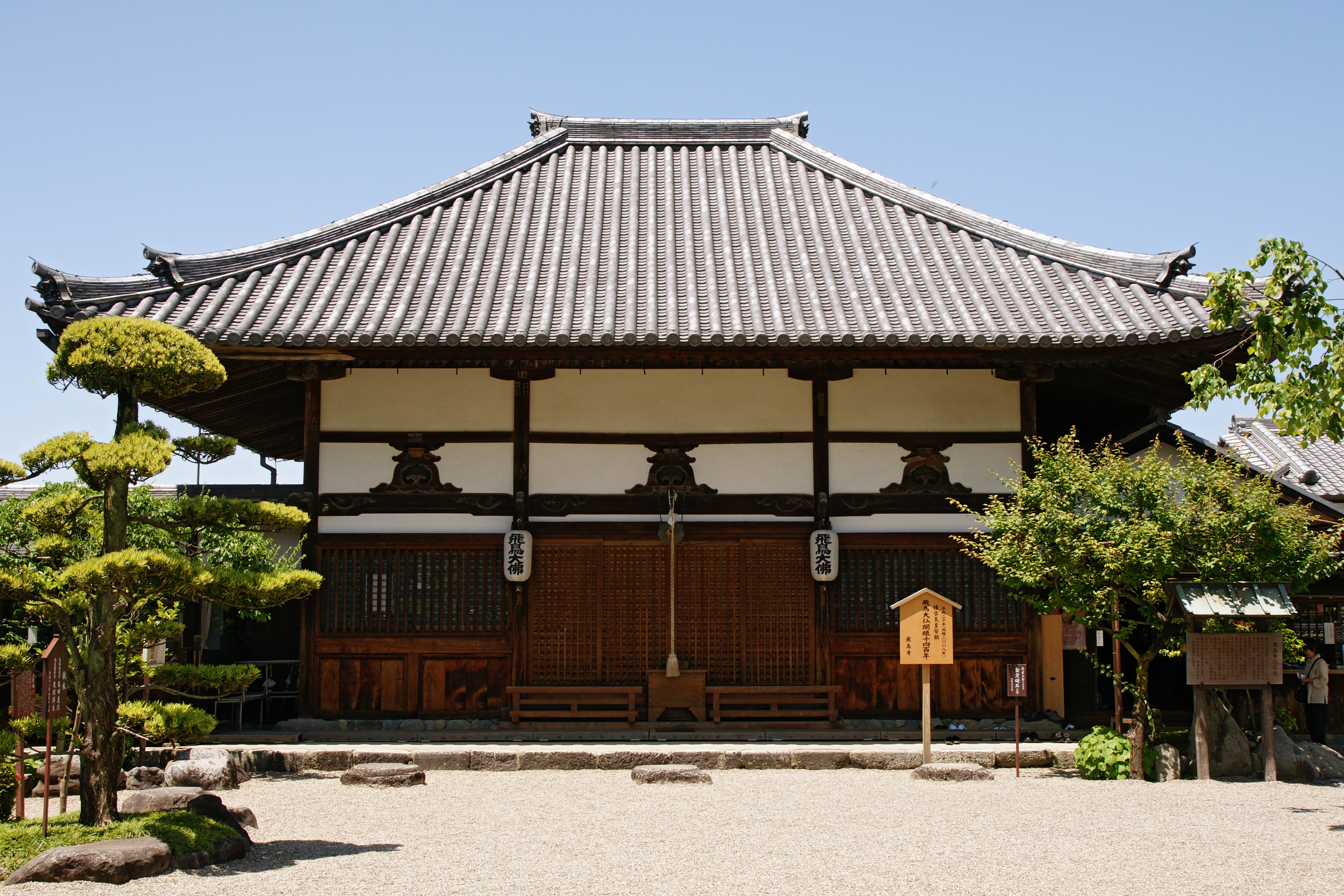
Main Hall at Asuka-dera, Asuka, Nara

== Directory ==
Number	Inscription	Temple	Location
1.	太子髻中四天王	Shitennō-ji	Tennōji-ku, Osaka
2.	下之太子	Taiseishōgun-ji	Yao, Osaka
3.	木槵樹八尾市太子堂	Dōmyō-ji	Fujiidera, Osaka
4.	河内史帰仏之寺	Sairin-ji	Habikino, Osaka
5.	中之太子	Yachū-ji	Habikino, Osaka
6.	上之太子	Eifuku-ji	Minamikawachi, Osaka
7.	南海夜光之霊木	Seson-ji	Yoshino, Nara
8.	太子誕生所橘之宮	Tachibana-dera	Asuka, Nara Prefecture
9.	太子建立第六院	Jōrin-ji	Asuka, Nara Prefecture
10.	鞍作止利創建寺	Kongō-ji	Asuka, Nara Prefecture
11.	止利仏師丈六釈迦	Asuka-dera	Asuka, Nara Prefecture
12.	仏法根源精舎	Kōgen-ji	Asuka, Nara Prefecture
13.	太子造寺九院之一	Nikkō-ji	Kashihara, Nara
14.	尺寸王身仏像	Hōryū-ji	Ikaruga, Nara Prefecture
15.	太子往生天寿国	Chūgū-ji	Ikaruga, Nara Prefecture
16.	山背王誕生水	Hōrin-ji	Ikaruga, Nara Prefecture
17.	法華経講讃岡本宮	Hokki-ji	Ikaruga, Nara Prefecture
18.	田村皇子問太子之病	Jofuku-ji	Ikaruga, Nara Prefecture
19.	飢人相見伝説地	Daruma-ji	Kitakatsuragi, Nara Prefecture
20.	四天王随一毘沙門天	Chōgosonshi-ji	Heguri, Nara Prefecture
21.	施鹿園	Heiryū-ji	Sangō, Nara Prefecture
22.	太子熊凝道場	Kakuan-ji	Yamatokōriyama, Nara Prefecture
23.	太子遺願大寺	Daian-ji	Nara, Nara Prefecture
24.	太子楓野行宮	Kōryū-ji	Ukyō-ku, Kyoto Prefecture
25.	太子守本尊	Rokkaku-dō	Nakagyō-ku, Kyoto Prefecture
26.	太子馬蹄石	Nakayama-dera	Takarazuka, Hyōgo
27.	刀田之太子	Kakurin-ji	Kakogawa, Hyōgo Prefecture
28.	鵤之太子	Ikaruga-dera	Taishi, Hyōgo Prefecture
