= Ikaruga-dera =

Buddhist temple in Taishi, Hyōgo, Japan

Coordinates: 34.8373°N 134.5757°E

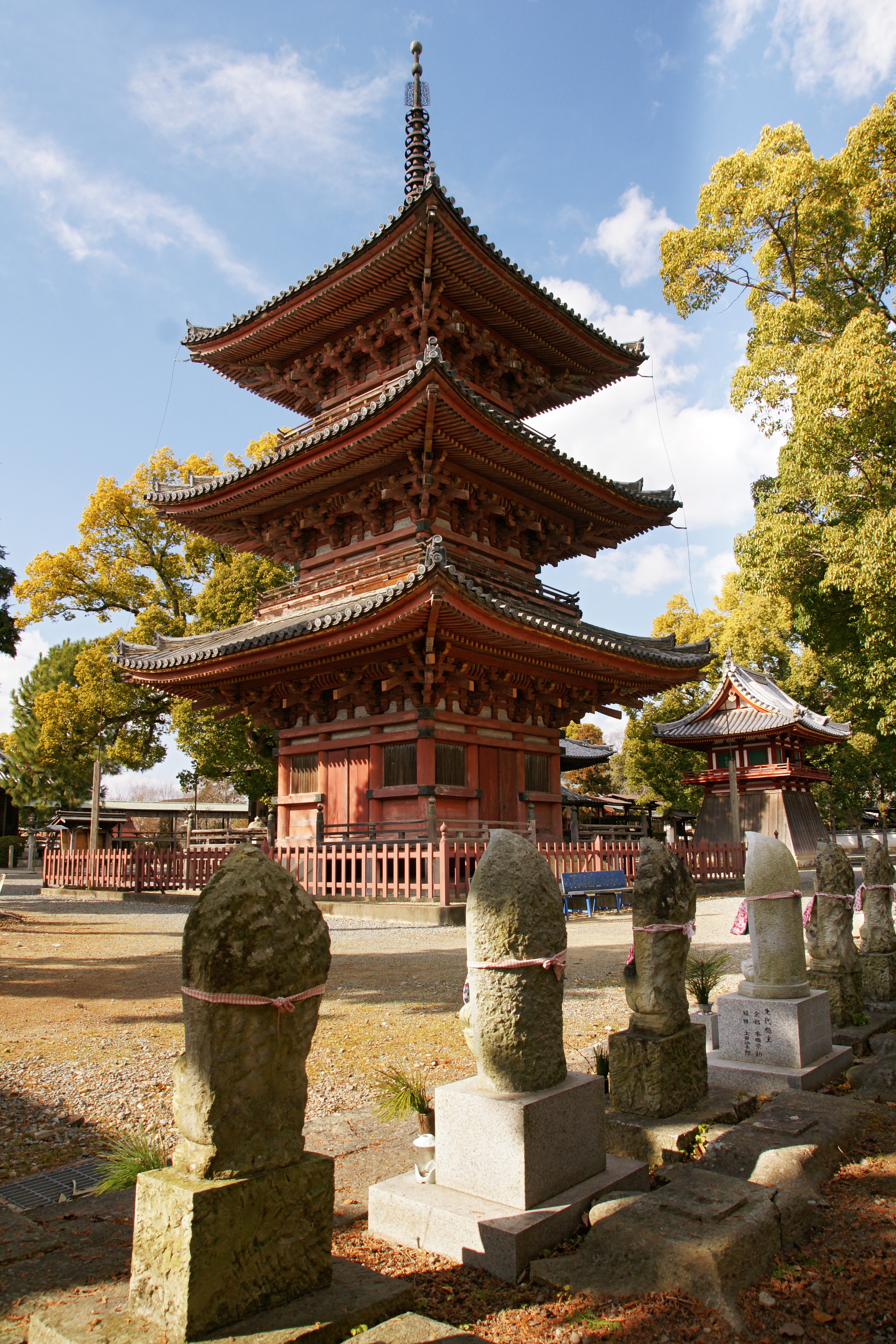
Pagoda

Ikaruga-dera (斑鳩寺) is a Buddhist temple in Taishi, Hyōgo Prefecture, Japan. It was founded by Prince Shōtoku in 607.

It should not be confused with Hōryū-ji in Nara, which also uses this appellation historically.

== See also ==
- Historical sites of Prince Shōtoku
