= Daruma uta =

Pejorative term for Zen poetry

Bodhidharma Song (達磨歌, daruma uta), lit. "a nonsense poem", is a pejorative term for Zen poetry. It seems that this term was coined in connection with the Zen kōan's "critical phrases" (話頭, Jp. wa tō; Ch. huà-tóu) that seemed like unintelligible riddles to ordinary people and other Buddhist schools.

This term was used by conservative waka poets to refer to the innovative style of Fujiwara no Teika (1162–1241), the compiler of the Hyakunin Isshu and Shin Kokin Wakashū, notwithstanding the fact that Teika himself had never been a Zen practitioner.

Daruma uta is not the same as the shakkyōka, which stands for Japanese Buddhist poetry in a general sense.
