= Genki (given name) =

- Gender: Male

Origin
- Origin: Japanese
- Meaning: Different meanings depending on the kanji used

Genki (written: 元気, 元喜, 元基, 元規, 源気 or 源基) is a masculine Japanese given name. Notable people with the name include:

- Genki Abe (安倍 源基; 1894–1989), Japanese lawyer, bureaucrat and politician
- Daiamami Genki (大奄美 元規; born 1992), Japanese sumo wrestler
- Genki Dean (born 1991), Japanese javelin thrower
- Genki Haraguchi (原口 元気; born 1991), Japanese footballer
- Genki Hitomi (人見 元基; born 1957), Japanese singer
- Genki Horiguchi (堀口 元気; born 1978), Japanese professional wrestler
- Genki Imamura (今村 元気; born 1982), Japanese swimmer
- Genki Muro (室 元気; born 1989), Japanese voice actor
- Genki Nagasato (永里 源気; born 1985), Japanese footballer
- Genki Nakayama (中山 元気; born 1981), Japanese footballer
- Genki Okawa (大河 元気; born 1987), Japanese actor and voice actor
- Genki Omae (大前 元紀; born 1989), Japanese footballer
- Genki Saito (born 2001), Japanese para swimmer
- Genki Sudo (須藤 元気; born 1978), Japanese mixed martial artist and kickboxer
- Genki Yamada (山田 元気; born 1994), Japanese footballer
- Genki Yamamoto (山本 元喜; born 1991), Japanese cyclist
