= Daruma-ji =

- 達磨寺, だるまじ
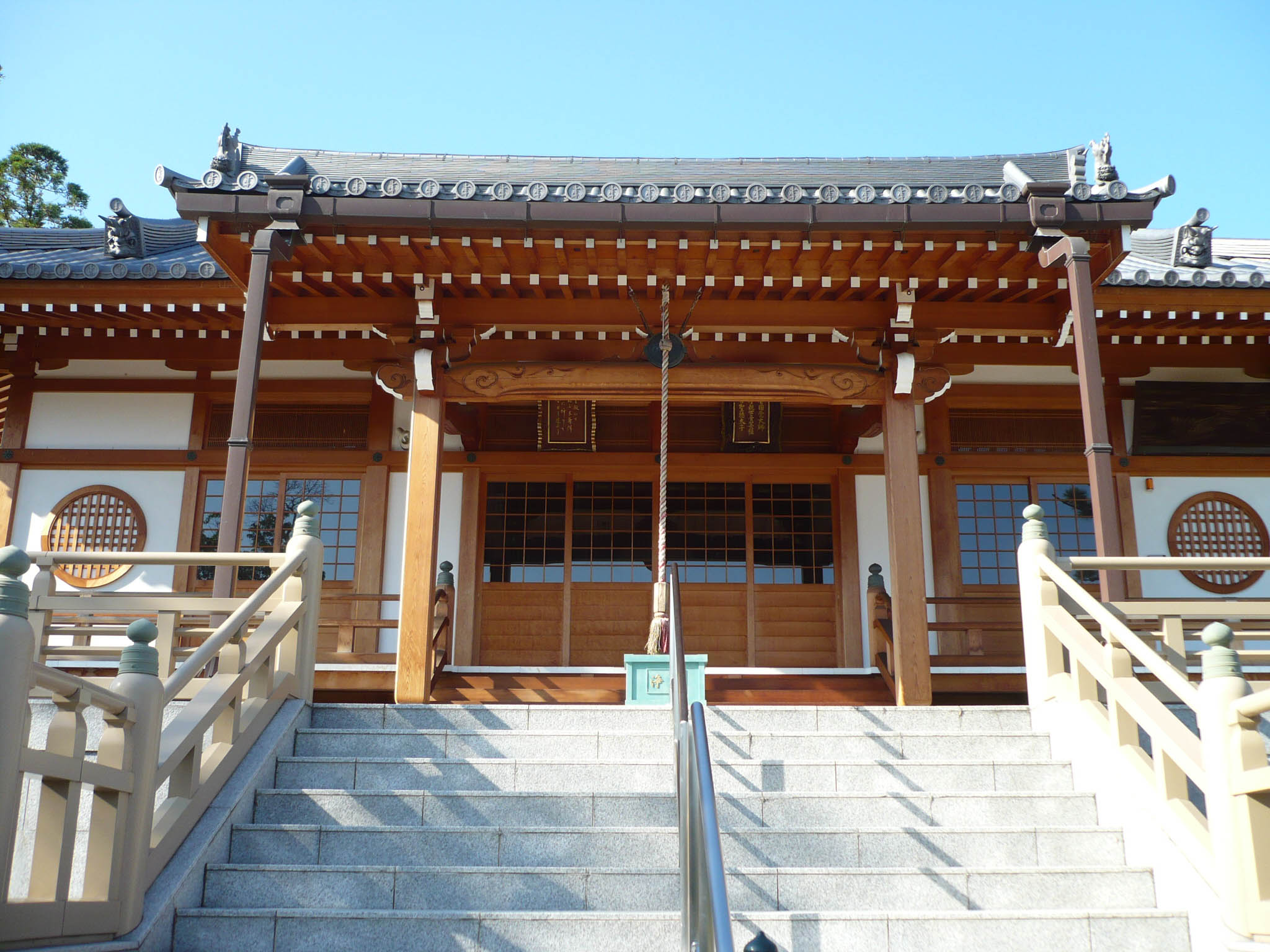
- Daruma-ji's main hall

- Location within Nara Prefecture Location within Japan

Religion
- Affiliation: Nanzen-ji school of Rinzai 1
- Prefecture: Nara
- Deity: Thousand-armed Kannon

Location
- Location: 1-40, Honmachi 2-chōme, Ōji, Kitakatsuragi-gun, Nara-ken 636-0012
- Country: Japan
- Interactive map of Daruma-ji
- Prefecture: Nara
- Coordinates: 34°35′24″N 135°42′24″E

Daruma-ji (Japanese: 達磨寺, lit. 'Daruma Temple', also called Daruma-dera) is a Zen Buddhist temple in the city of Ōji in the Kitakatsuragi District, Nara Prefecture, Japan and is one of the 28 historical Sites of Prince Shōtoku.

== History ==
The founding of the temple is associated with an event recorded in the 8th century work Nihon Shoki. In Book XXII, Prince Shōtoku met a man in December 613. The man was starving, and Prince Shōtoku tried to feed him and give him aid, but the man died of hunger and Prince Shōtoku had a kofun built for him. Days later, Prince Shōtoku declared that the man was a sage and had a messenger inspect the tomb, which was undisturbed but empty when opened. In Nihon Shoki the sage is unnamed, but was later attributed as Daruma (Japanese: 達磨, lit. 'Bodhidharma').

The Daruma-ji temple was built at the kofun in the early 13th century during the Kamakura period. The temple was razed in the early 14th century by Buddhists who opposed the spread of the Zen school in Japan. It was rebuilt in 1430 under the direction of Ashikaga Yoshinori. The temple was burned down by Matsunaga Hisahide in the 16th century during the Sengoku period, and subsequently rebuilt by the order of Emperor Ōgimachi.

== Cultural artifacts ==
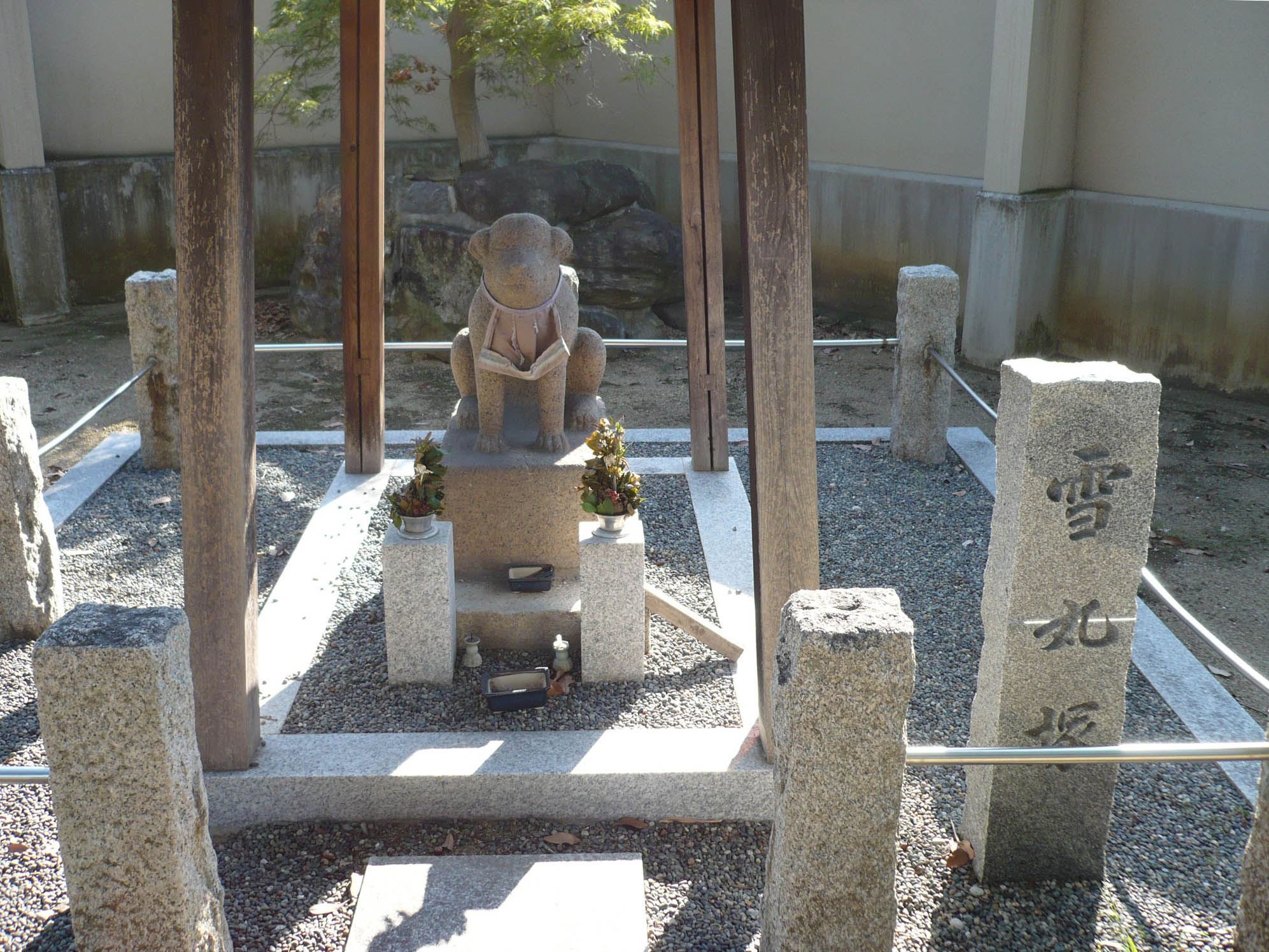
Statue of Yukimaru at Daruma-ji

Daruma-ji has a statue memorializing Prince Shōtoku's dog Yukimaru, who was said to be able to understand speech and could read Buddhist writings. Yukimaru's association with Daruma-ji inspired the city of Ōji to use Yukimaru as the Yuru-chara (mascot) for the city beginning in 2013.

Daruma-ji has several artifacts that are designated as cultural properties. The hōjō was constructed in 1667 and became a prefecture-designated tangible cultural property in 1989.

The Daruma-ji Chukoki Sekido (Japanese: 達磨寺中興記石幢, lit. 'Stone Column Recording the Revival of Daruma-ji') is a stone monument erected in 1448, describing the restoration of the temple during the Muromachi period, which was supported by the Muromachi bakufu. The stone became a nationally designated important cultural property in 1923. In 2000, a stone was found in the base of the Chukoki stone which was inscribed in 1442, along with a Bizen ware pot and an incense burner that were subsequently assigned as nationally designated cultural properties.

The temple has a wooden seated statue of Daruma, made in 1430 and commissioned by Ashikaga Yoshinori, that was designated as an important cultural property in 1909. The temple also has a wooden seated statue of Prince Shōtoku that was designated as an important cultural property in 1923. A pair of paintings at the temple, one of Prince Shōtoku and one of Daruma, are designated as important cultural property along with a silk painting of the Buddha's death. The silk painting was originally held by the temple and is now held at the Nara National Museum. A wooden seated statue of Senju Kannon created during the Muromachi period was designated a tangible cultural property in 2005.
