= Taiseishōgun-ji =

Temple in Yao, Ōsaka, Japan

Coordinates: 34.6134°N 135.5880°E

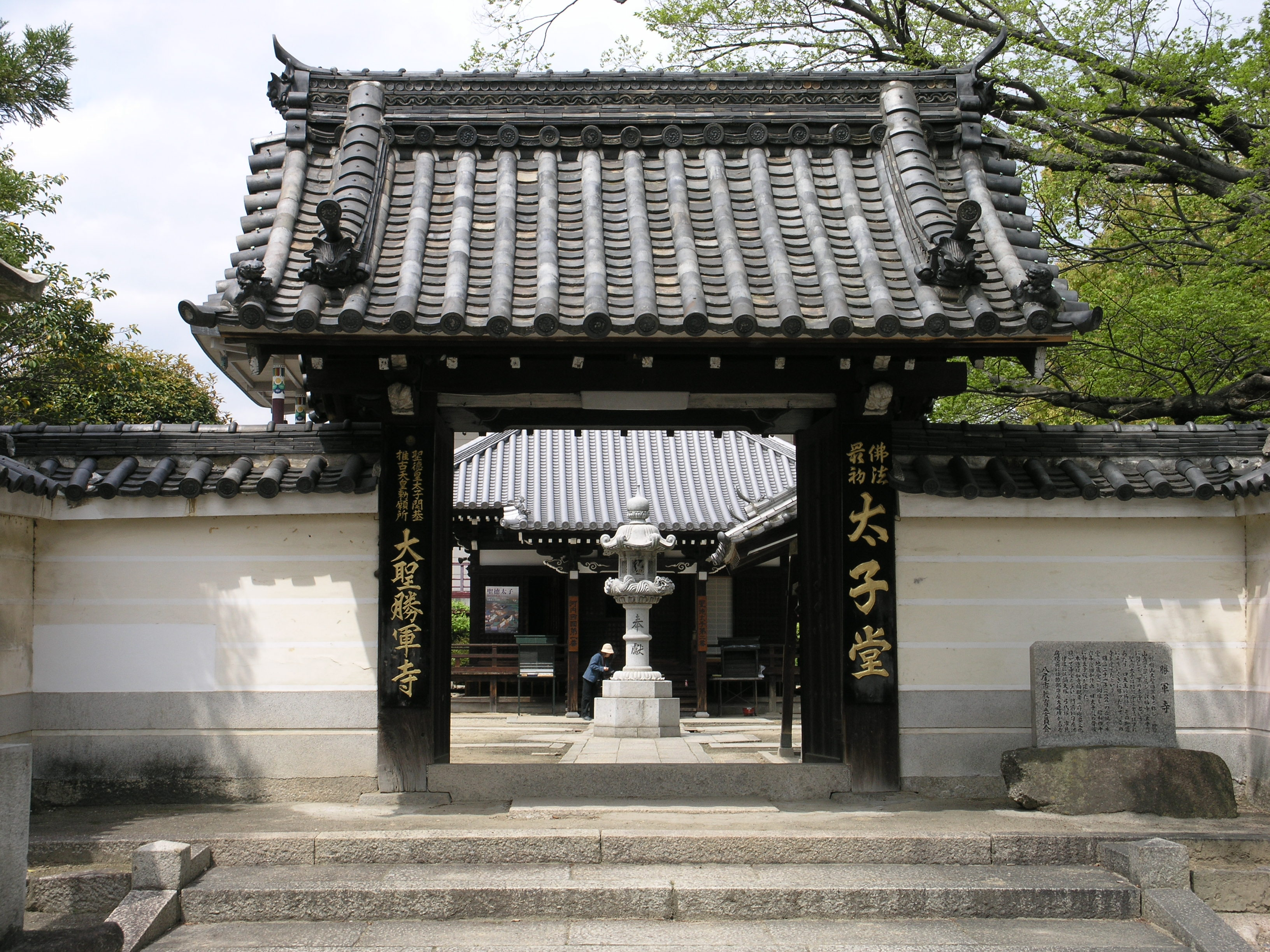
Main Hall

Taiseishōgun-ji (大聖勝軍寺) is a Buddhist temple in Yao, Osaka Prefecture, Japan. It was founded in 587 and is affiliated with Kōyasan Shingon-shū.

== See also ==
- Historical Sites of Prince Shōtoku
