= Genki: An Integrated Course in Elementary Japanese =

Textbook for learners of Japanese

- Genki Third Edition Cover
- Author: Eri Banno, Yoko Ikeda, Yutaka Ohno, Yoko Sakane, Chikako Shinagawa, Kyoko Tokashiki
- Original title: げんき
- Language: Japanese
- Publisher: The Japan Times
- Publication place: Japan
- Pages: 384 (Volume 1); 392 (Volume 2)
- Website: https://genki3.japantimes.co.jp/en/

Genki: An Integrated Course in Elementary Japanese is a textbook for learners of the Japanese language that starts at an absolute beginner level. The textbook is divided into two volumes, containing 23 lessons focusing on Japanese grammar, vocabulary, and kanji. It is used in many universities throughout the English-speaking world and also is often used as a self-study text. The course is notable for its illustrations and cast of recurring characters.

== Description ==
Genki: An Integrated Course in Elementary Japanese is divided into two volumes: Genki I and Genki II. Genki I has an orange scheme, while Genki II has a green color scheme. Genki I focuses on beginner-level Japanese, from kana on through adjective and verb constructions, and Genki II continued on to intermediate-level topics.

Both books are divided into a Conversation and Grammar section and a Reading and Writing section, each containing their own sets of 23 lessons. Each lesson follows a predictable structure.

Conversation and Grammar sections start with a Dialogue starring Genki's cast of characters navigating their lives as college students. These dialogues are followed by a vocabulary list and short grammar lessons featuring words and sentence structures from the Dialogue. These sections usually conclude with extra notes on Japanese grammar and culture. These sections are followed by practice questions and sometimes a Useful Expressions tab on simple grammatical concepts such as time or navigating a bank transaction in Japanese.

Reading and Writing sections are focused on introducing Kanji. Learners are presented with a grid of Kanji accompanied by on'yomi and kun'yomi pronunciations, writing steps, and a selection of words that incorporate each character. The rest of the lesson contains practice questions centered around a reading using new Kanji characters. These readings usually focus on some Japanese cultural or historical aspect, such as Doraemon, Yoko Ono or the bombing of Hiroshima.

Genki I and Genki II have accompanying workbooks that follow the 23 lessons with exercises based on each grammar topic, short writing exercises, and listening exercises. The listening questions are based on Genki audio materials distributed through the OTO-Navi or on a CD included with the workbook. The audio recordings feature narrations of each lesson's dialogue, reading, and certain practice questions.

The book's title Genki (from 元気) is an early vocab word meaning "lively" or "energetic." Some releases of the book feature a Japanese obi strip book cover.

== Characters ==
The narrative of the Genki textbooks focuses on the Japanese program of the fictional Sakura University and the foreign exchange students who attend classes there. Genki's third edition attempted to make the cast more diverse by adding foreign exchange students from non-English speaking countries.

=== Main ===
- Mary Hart (メアリー・ハート) is an American 2nd-year foreign exchange student from Arizona. Genki I begins with her arriving at Sakura University's orientation and introducing herself. Mary lives with a host family and enjoys traveling in Japan. She is frequently illustrated in the practice exercises doing any activity the questions require. Her voice actor in the Audio files is Migo Nagahori.
- Takeshi Kimura (木村たけし) is a 4th-year Japanese student at Sakura University, who later graduates and gets a job at a travel agency. Despite going to the wrong restaurant on their first date, he and Mary become a couple over the course of the textbooks.
- Professor Yamashita (山下先生) instructs the foreign students on Japanese at Sakura University. He is the only teacher to regularly feature in the Genki storyline and generally serves as a straight man to the students. As said in the amounts exercises, Professor Yamashita only has two shirts. This has caused speculation that Yamashita may be going through a financial crisis, and is even depicted as homeless in one of the stories. He first makes his appearance in a South Asian style restaurant known as “Little Asia”. At the restaurant, Yamashita does not know which curry to order, and asks the waiter for help. Towards the later books, he is seen with more and more dislike, and someone even threatens to whip him.
- John Wang (ジョン・ワン) is a student from Cairns, Australia, introduced near the end of Genki I. He later becomes a central character in Genki II, starring in nearly half of the Dialogues. John is presented as a worse student than Mary and Takeshi and suffers a string of bad luck, from losing his assignments to getting his apartment ransacked by a burglar.

Supporting characters include Japanese students Yuri Yamakura and Ken Suzuki as well as foreign exchange students Sora Kim and Robert Smith, who have minor recurring roles in various Dialogues.

== Publication history ==
- 1st edition: 20 May 1999
- 2nd edition: 20 March 2011
- 3rd edition: 5 March 2020
