= Eifuku-ji =

Buddhist temple in Minamikawachi District, Osaka

Coordinates: 34.0295°N 132.9785°E

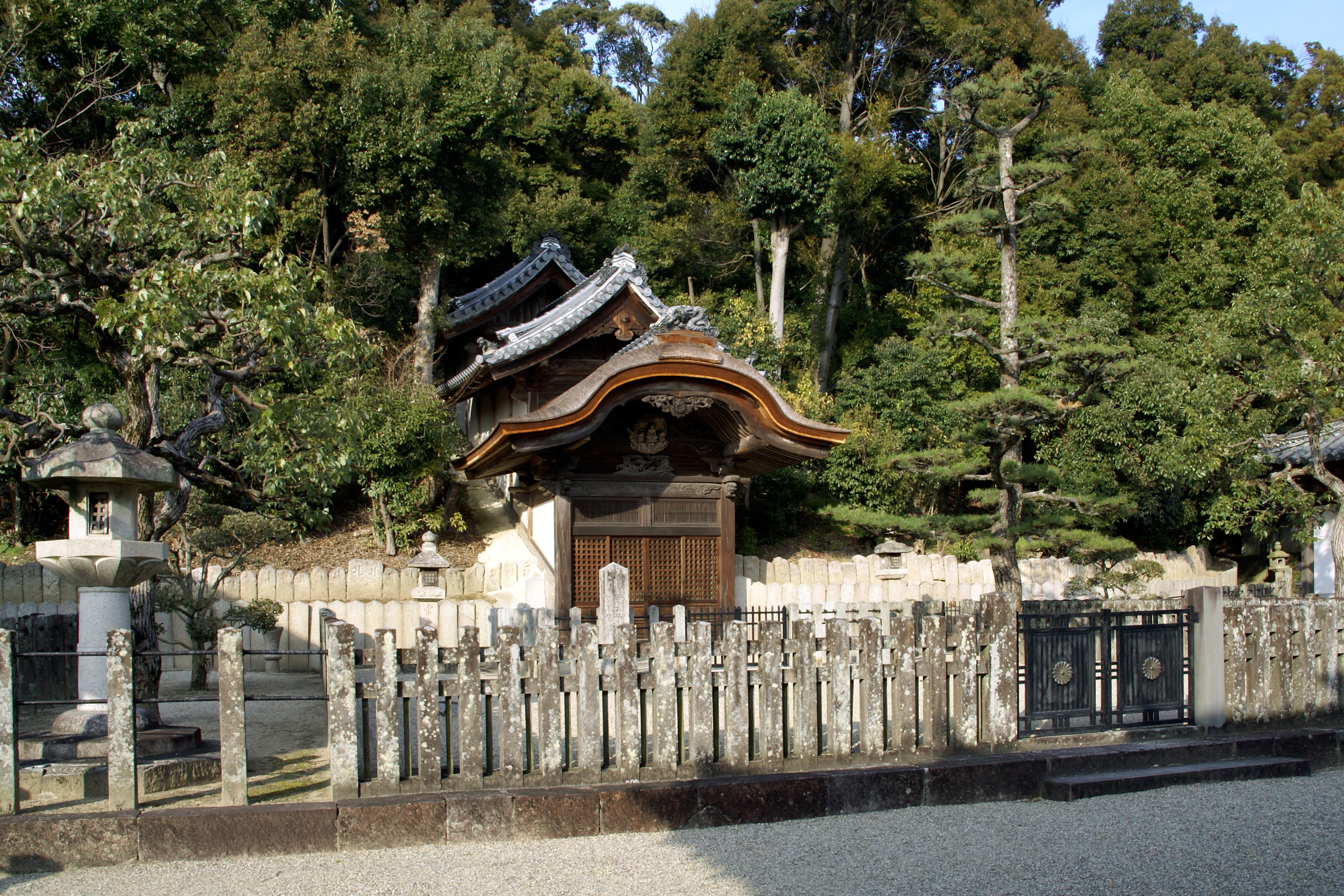
Temple buildings

Eifuku-ji (叡福寺) is a Buddhist temple in Minamikawachi, Osaka, Japan. It is affiliated with Shingon Buddhism. According to legend, it was founded in 724 by Emperor Shōmu.

== See also ==
- Historical Sites of Prince Shōtoku
