= Daruma Magazine =

Japanese art magazine

- Categories: Art
- Frequency: Quarterly
- Founded: 1993
- Final issue Number: 2011; 70
- Country: Japan
- Based in: Amagasaki
- Language: English
- Website: www.darumamagazine.com
- ISSN: 0918-0095

Daruma Magazine was a quarterly English language magazine published in Amagasaki, Japan, and devoted to Japanese art and antiques. It was published by Takeguchi Momoko and edited by author Alistair Seton. It commenced publication in 1993. In addition to the major articles, each issue contained brief articles on haiku, woodblock prints, and ikebana. The magazine ceased publication in 2011, with Issue 70 (Vol. 18, No. 2) being its last.
