= Fumi no Nemaro =

Japanese general (died 707)

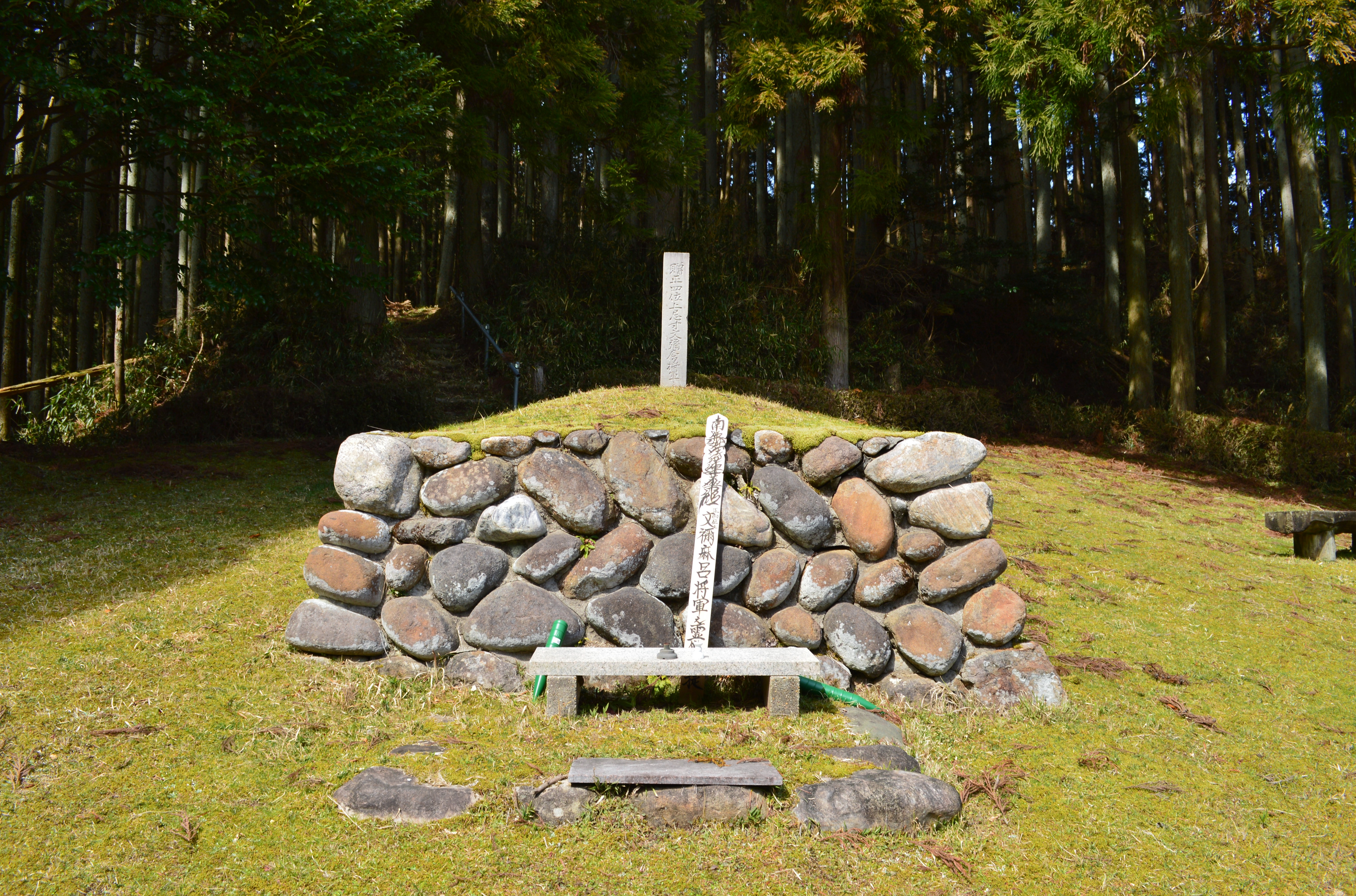
- Grave of Fumi no Nemaro
- Born: Unknown
- Died: October 21, 707
- Occupation: general in Asuka period Japan
- Known for: served in the army of Prince Ōama in the Jinshin War

Fumi no Nemaro (文禰麻呂) was a general in Asuka period Japan, who served in the army of Prince Ōama in the Jinshin War.

== Biography ==
The Fumi clan (written various as 書氏, 文首、文連、文忌寸文主) was a toraijin clan, claiming descent from Emperor Gaozu of the Han dynasty and the Wani clan, who came to Japan during the reign of Emperor Ojin. The name of Fumi no Nemaro appears in appears in the Nihon Shoki and Shoku Nihongi as one of the retainers of Prince Ōama. Emperor Tenji had originally designated his brother, Prince Ōama, as his successor, but later changed his mind in favor of his son, Prince Ōtomo. Following this decision, Prince Ōama retired to the Yoshino Palace and announced his intention to become a monk. However, in 672 on the death of Emperor Tenji and the accession of Prince Ōtomo as Emperor Kōbun, Prince Ōama decided to raise an army to take the throne by force. He fled east to Mino Province accompanied by his wife, children, about 20 servants, and about 10 court ladies and Fumi no Nemaro was in his retinue. Upon safely reaching Mino, the prince gathered forces, and divided his army into two, with one army to attack Ōmi Province, where Prince Ōtomo had his palace at Ōmi-Ōtsu (currently Ōtsu city, Shiga Prefecture) and the other to march directly into Yamato Province. Fumi no Nemaro was appointed general to lead the invasion of Ōmi, and successfully defeated Prince Ōtomo's forces in several engagements over the course of a month. After the fall of Ōmi-Ōtsu, Prince Ōtomo committed suicide, bringing the Jinshin War to an end.

In the Nihon Shoki, in an entry dated December 4, 672, the first year of Emperor Tenmu's reign, higher court ranks were given to those who had distinguished themselves in meritorious service in the war. In an entry dated July 21, 701, in the Shoku Nihongi, Fumi no Nemaro was given 100 estates for his past achievements. It is recorded that he died in 707. At the time of his death, he held the court rank of Junior Fourth Rank Lower Grade. Empress Genmei posthumously presented him with the rank of Junior Fourth Rank Senior Grade. Per the article in the Shoku Nihongi he died on October 24, but the inscription on the epitaph found in his tomb states that he died on September 21.

== Grave of Fumi no Nemaro ==
In September 1683, Fumi no Nemaro's grave was discovered and excavated in what is now the Haibara Hattaki neighborhood of the city of Uda Nara Prefecture. His cremated bones had been placed in a glass ossuary, which was then wrapped in cloth and placed in a gilt bronze urn. The copper epitaph plaque in the copper box read: " Jinshin Year General Commander of the Left Guard, Junior Fourth Rank Senior Grade, Fumi no Nemaro; Died on September 21, Year 4 of the Year of Keiun". This is the oldest known example of an epitaph associated with a cremated grave in Japan.

The grave was then refilled and the excavated items were placed in the local temple of Ryusen-ji. In 1952, these items were collectively designated a National Treasure, and are currently in the possession of the Tokyo National Museum. The grave was re-excavated in 1982 using modern methods. It was to be revealed a pit containing hard charcoal with a covering clay layer three meters thick. The pit was a square with rounded corners measuring 2.5 meters east-to-west and more than 2.0 meters north-to-south, with all four sides roughly aligned with the compass. The pit was covered with 4-5 centimeters of clay and sand, with fist-sized piles of hard coal on top, and a base was built to hold the ossuary and gravestone, which were then covered with clay. The site was designated a National Historic Site on April 5, 1984, was one of the few known graves of ancient high-ranking officials.

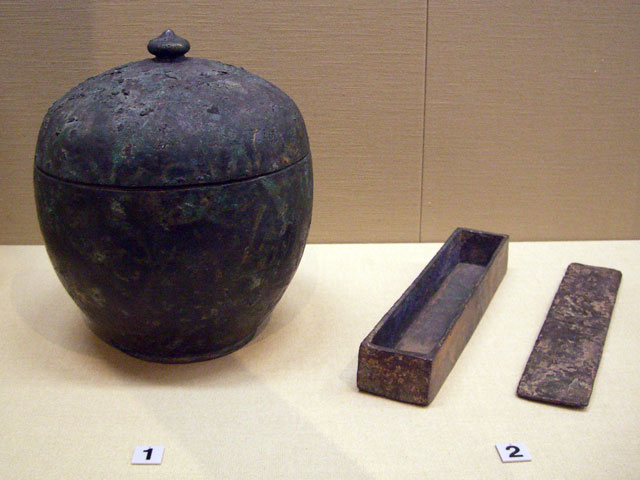
Gilt-bronze urn, NT

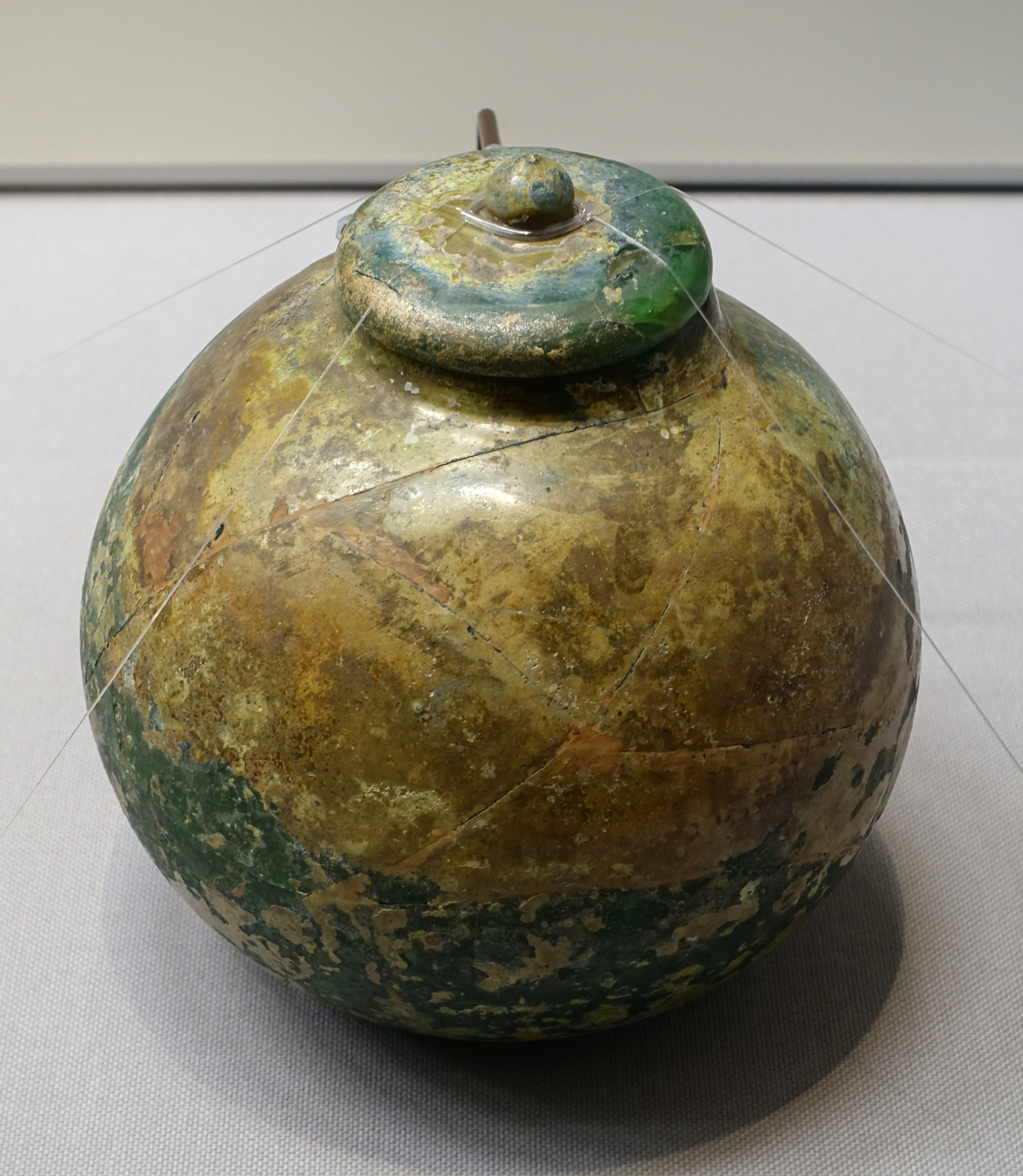
Glass ossuary, NT

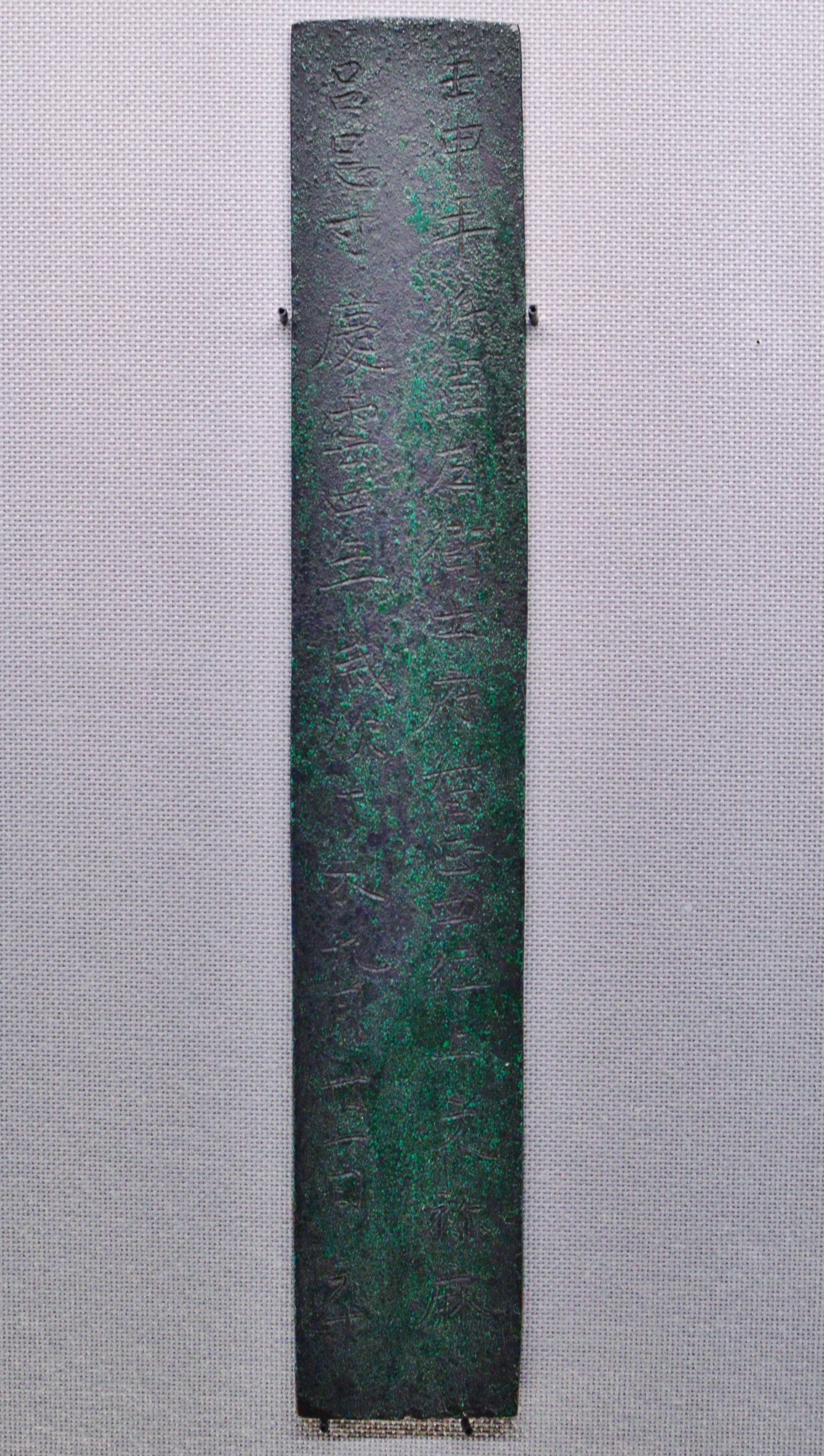
Epitaph (NT)

== Bibliography ==
- "Jinshin no Ran." (1985). Kodansha Encyclopedia of Japan. Tokyo: Kodansha Ltd.
