= Princess Hatsusebe =

- Died: 28 March 741
- Spouse: Prince Kawashima
- Father: Emperor Tenmu
- Mother: Shishihito no Kajihime-no-iratsume

Princess Hatsusebe (泊瀬部皇女, Hatsusebe no himemiko) (died 28 March 741) was a Japanese princess during the Asuka period and the Nara period.

== Life ==
Hatsusebe was a daughter of Emperor Tenmu. Her mother was Lady Kajihime, whose father was Shishibito no Omi Ōmaro. Her siblings included Prince Osakabe, Prince Shiki, and Princess Taki.

She was made to marry her cousin, Prince Kawashima. Kawashima took part in the conspiracy behind the rebellion with Princes Ōtsu, Osakabe, and Shigi in 686, then betrayed them. Because of his treachery, the plot was exposed before it could be carried out, and the conspirators were all punished except Kawashima.

She never remarried after Kawashima's death in 691, and she died on the 28th day of the 3rd month in 741.
