= Princess Ki =

Japanese princess

Princess Ki (紀皇女) was a Japanese princess during the Asuka period of Japanese history. She was a daughter of Emperor Tenmu and Lady Ōnu, whose father was Soga no Akaye. Her brother was Prince Hozumi and her sister Princess Takata.

== Genealogy ==
Some people say that she was once a wife of Prince Karu, a grandson of Empress Jitō, but no clear evidence exists.

The Man'yōshū includes some poems of her love for her half-brother Prince Yuge, a son of Princess Ōe. No other historical materials recording about her life are existing. No records say that she married him.
