= 699 =

Calendar year

699 in various calendars
Gregorian calendar	699; DCXCIX
Ab urbe condita	1452
Armenian calendar	148; ԹՎ ՃԽԸ
Assyrian calendar	5449
Balinese saka calendar	620–621
Bengali calendar	105–106
Berber calendar	1649
Buddhist calendar	1243
Burmese calendar	61
Byzantine calendar	6207–6208
Chinese calendar	戊戌年 (Earth Dog); 3396 or 3189 — to — 己亥年 (Earth Pig); 3397 or 3190
Coptic calendar	415–416
Discordian calendar	1865
Ethiopian calendar	691–692
Hebrew calendar	4459–4460
- Hindu calendars
Vikram Samvat	755–756
Shaka Samvat	620–621
Kali Yuga	3799–3800
Holocene calendar	10699
Iranian calendar	77–78
Islamic calendar	79–80
Japanese calendar	Shuchō 14 (朱鳥１４年)
Javanese calendar	591–592
Julian calendar	699; DCXCIX
Korean calendar	3032
Minguo calendar	1213 before ROC 民前1213年
Nanakshahi calendar	−769
Seleucid era	1010/1011 AG
Thai solar calendar	1241–1242
Tibetan calendar	ས་ཕོ་ཁྱི་ལོ་ (male Earth-Dog); 825 or 444 or −328 — to — ས་མོ་ཕག་ལོ་ (female Earth-Boar); 826 or 445 or −327

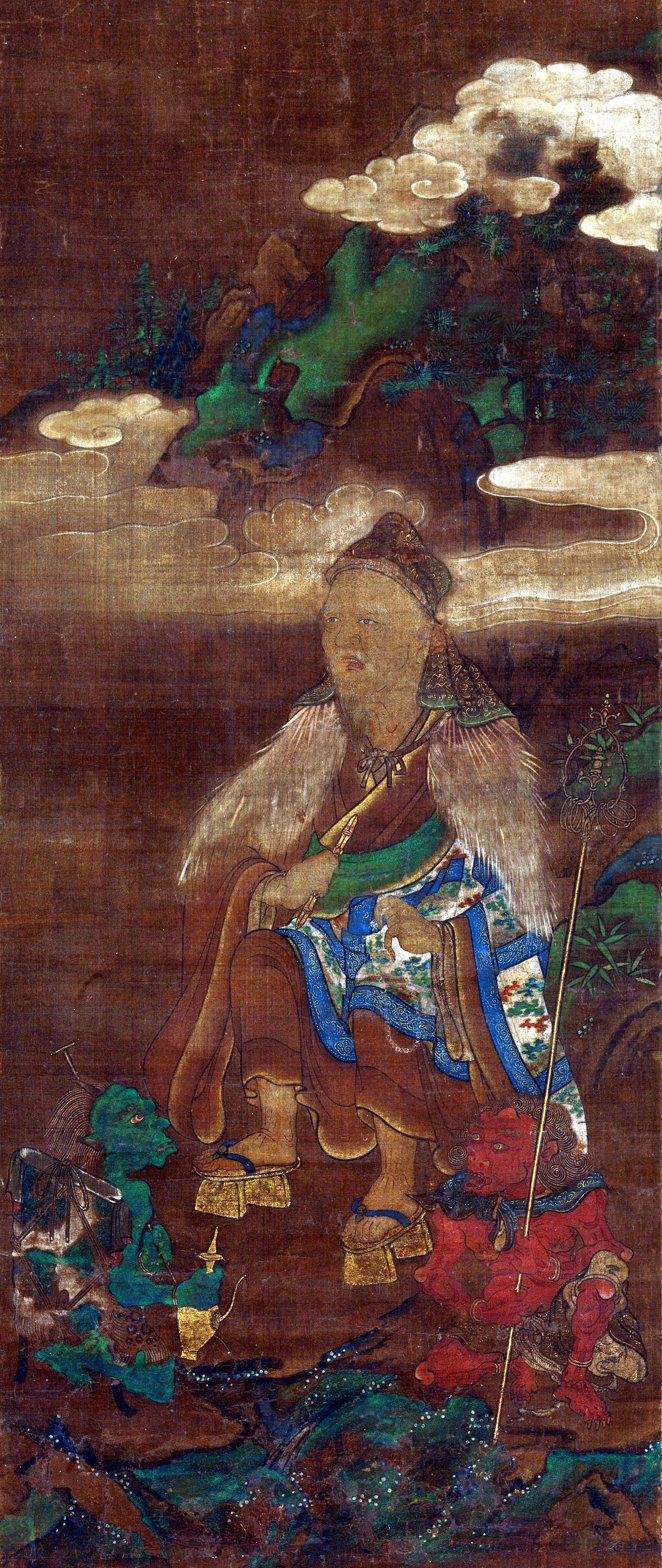
En no Ozunu (c. 634–c.700)

Year 699 (DCXCIX) was a common year starting on Wednesday of the Julian calendar. The denomination 699 for this year has been used since the early medieval period, when the Anno Domini calendar era became the prevalent method in Europe for naming years.

== Events ==
=== By place ===
==== Umayyad Caliphate ====
- Umayyad troops invade Armenia, and secure the submission of Prince Smbat VI Bagratuni. The South Caucasus becomes a viceroyalty called al-Arminiya, and is divided into four regions: Caucasian Albania, Caucasian Iberia, the area around the Aras River, and Taron (modern Turkey).

==== Asia ====
- June 26 – En no Ozunu, Japanese ascetic, is banished to Izu Ōshima (a volcanic island in the Izu Islands), and accused of confusing the mind of the people with magic. He will be later regarded as the founder of a folk religion called Shugendō.

== Births ==
- September 5 – Abū Hanīfa, Arab imam and scholar (d. 767)
- Dagobert III, king of the Franks (approximate date; d. 715)
- Wang Wei, Chinese poet (d. 759)
- Wasil ibn Ata, Muslim theologian (d. 748)

== Deaths ==
- Niitabe, Japanese princess
- Ōe, Japanese princess
- Seaxburh of Ely, queen of Kent
- Yuge, Japanese prince
