= Prince Osakabe =

Japanese prince (d. 705)

Prince Osakabe 刑部親王

Chancellor of the Realm
- Tenure: 703 – 705
- Successor: Prince Hozumi
- Born: Unknown
- Died: 2 June 706
- Spouse: Princess Asuka; Unknown concubine
- Issue: Prince Yamasaki; Prince Ōnu; Prince Iwata; Prince Konagaya
- Father: Emperor Tenmu
- Mother: Shishihito no Kajihime-no-iratsume

Prince Osakabe (刑部(忍壁)親王, Osakabe Shinnō) (died June 2, 705) was a Japanese imperial prince who helped write the Taihō Code (681 A.D.), alongside Fujiwara no Fuhito. The Code was essentially an administrative reorganization, which would serve as the basis for Japan's governmental structure for centuries afterwards.

== Background ==
Prince Osakabe was born to Emperor Tenmu and Kajihime no Iratsume in approximately 663 A.D.

According to the Nihon Shoki in the fifth month, on the fifth day of 679 A.D. Prince Osakabe, Prince Kusakabe, Prince Otsu, Prince Takechi, Prince Kawashima, and Prince Shiki, all swore to Emperor Tenmu that they wouldn't engage in future succession disputes. This occurred after Emperor Tenmu ascended the throne after the Jinshin War. In the first months of 704 A.D. he, Prince Naga, Prince Toneri, and Prince Hozumi were collectively awarded two hundred households by Emperor Monmu and Empress Genmei.

Along with Prince Kawashima, Osakabe was appointed to lead the emperor's 681 initiative, which was tasked with compiling the Imperial Chronicles and Fundamental Dicta.

== Works ==
The Nihon Shoki or The Chronicles of Japan, are a historiographical collection of writing composed into thirteen books covering the Japanese history from its beginning until Empress Jitō was forced to relinquish her throne in 697. Prince Osakabe was a contributor to the project since its inception in the 680's. Osakabe, like many other courtiers of the time, was also a poet, and one of his poems is included in the Man'yōshū. The Volume III of this collection opens with a poem - written by Kakinomoto no Asomi Hitomaro - dedicated to Osakabe.

Osakabe's contribution to the reforms undertaken by Emperor Monmu included the draft of several laws and decrees based on the Chinese model. With small modifications, many of these are still valid today.

== Genealogy ==
Parents

- Father: Emperor Tenmu (天武天皇, c. 631 – October 1, 686)
- Mother: Shishihito no Kajihime-no-iratsume (宍人梶媛娘), Shishihito-no-Omi Ōmaro's daughter

Consort and issue(s):

- Consort (Hi): Princess Asuka (明日香皇女, d. 27 April 700), daughter of Emperor Tenji
- Concubine: Unknown
  - First Son: Prince Yamasaki (山前王, d. 20 January 723)
  - Second Son: Prince Ōno (大野王, 5 August 737)
  - Third Son: Prince Iwata (石田王)
  - First Daughter: Princess Konagaya (小長谷女王, d. 11 February 767)
