= Murakuni Oyori =

Ancient Japanese military commander

Murakuni no Oyori
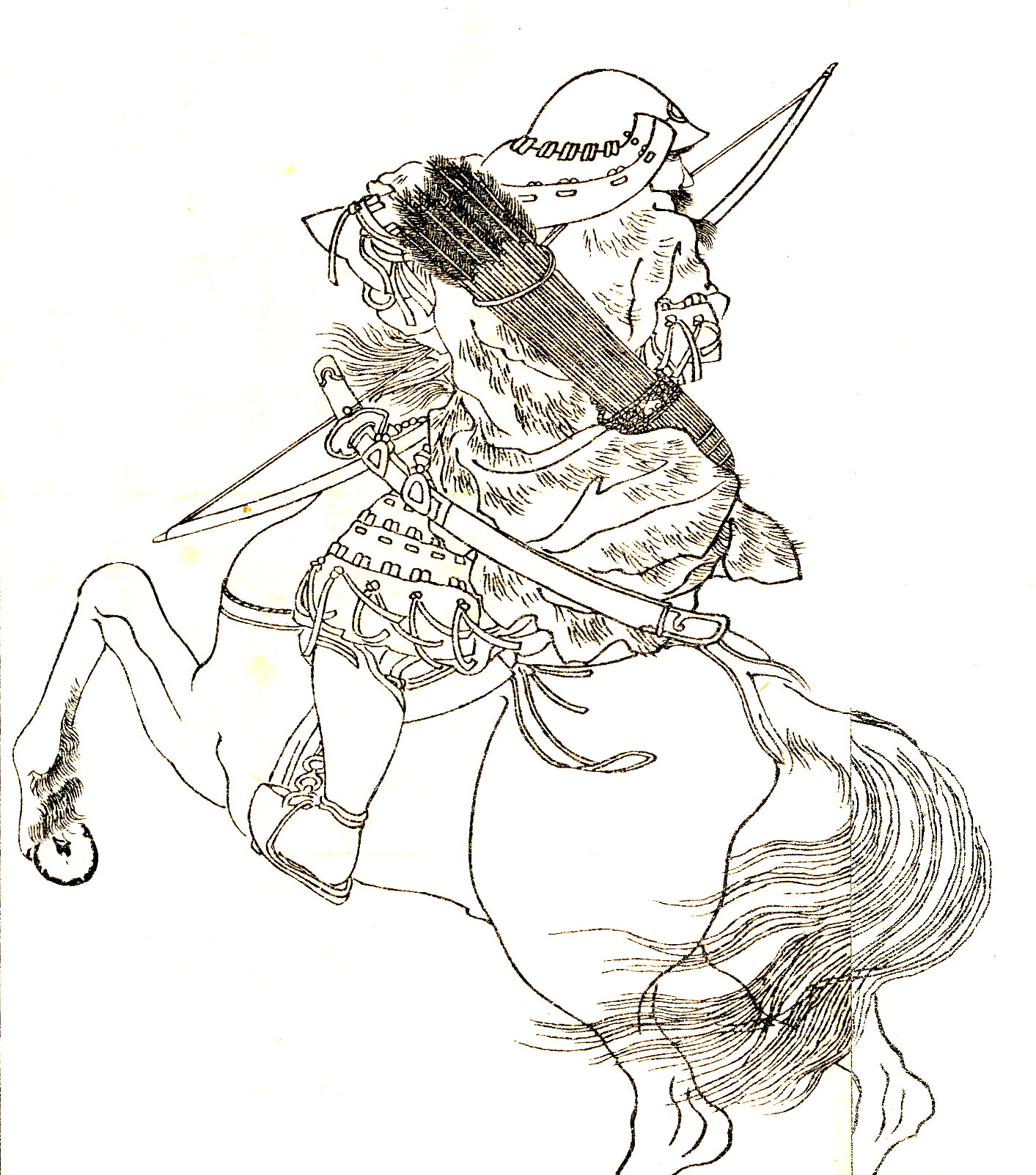
- Illustration of Murakuni no Oyori
- Native name: 村国男依
- Died: July 676
- Rank: Shōshi (posthumously)
- Battles / wars: Jinshin War

Murakuni Oyori (村国男依) (died 676) was a military commander of ancient Japan, who fought in the Jinshin War as a servant of Prince Ō-ama. His kabane, or family title, is muraji. He was given the rank of Shōshi after death.

The Murakuni clan was influential in Mino Province. Oyori was a servant of Prince Ō-ama. When Emperor Tenji became ill in 671, his brother Ō-ama decided to retire from political life in order to evade successor rivalry with Prince Ōtomo, the emperor's son. But the retirement was a fake. He later plotted a revolt called the Jinshin War.

Six months after the death of Tenji, on June 22, 672, Prince Ō-ama sent three messengers to Ō Honji, the administrator of the prince's domain of Ahachima (later Anpachi District) in Mino Province. This was the first action of the revolt. The messengers Murakuni Oyori, Wanibe Kimite, and Mugetsu Hiro incited the province to rebellion against the government of Prince Ōtomo (Emperor Kōbun). Then Oyori returned to report. Ō-ama started Yoshino to Mino on June 24 and met with Oyori on June 26 near the district office of Asaake District in Ise Province. Oyori informed that 3,000 soldiers of Mino occupied Fuwa (today's Sekigahara), a narrow point between the eastern provinces and Ōtsu, the capital of Japan at the time. Content with the success of the first critical action, Ō-ama praised Oyori.

Ō-ama collected more soldiers from the eastern provinces and sent two armies on July 2. One was a reinforcement to Yamato Province. The other main force marched to Ōmi Province and Ōtsu. Oyori was one of four commanders of this army and probably the most prominent one.

The army of "Oyori and others" fought their first battle at Yokokawa of Okinaga on July 7. They cut down the enemy general, Sakaibe Kusuri. On July 9 they defeated the enemy at Tokome and killed Hata Tomotari. On the 13th they won a victory at the riverside of Yasukawa, catching Kosohe Ōkuchi and Haji Chishima. On the 17th they swept the enemy from the capital of Ōmi province. Finally, on July 22, Prince Ōtomo himself led a large army at Seto of the Uji River near Ōtsu. Ōtomo lost the battle and committed suicide the next day.

Emperor Tenmu, former Prince Ō-ama, gave Oyori a fiefdom (in reality, tax revenue) composed of 120 families. This was the prize of highest merit given to warriors. Murakuni Oyori died in July 676. He was given the rank of Shōshi posthumously. On March 8, 716, his son Shigamaro was granted rice fields based on Oyori's meritorious service.
