= Funya no Kiyomi =

Funya no Kiyomi 文室浄三
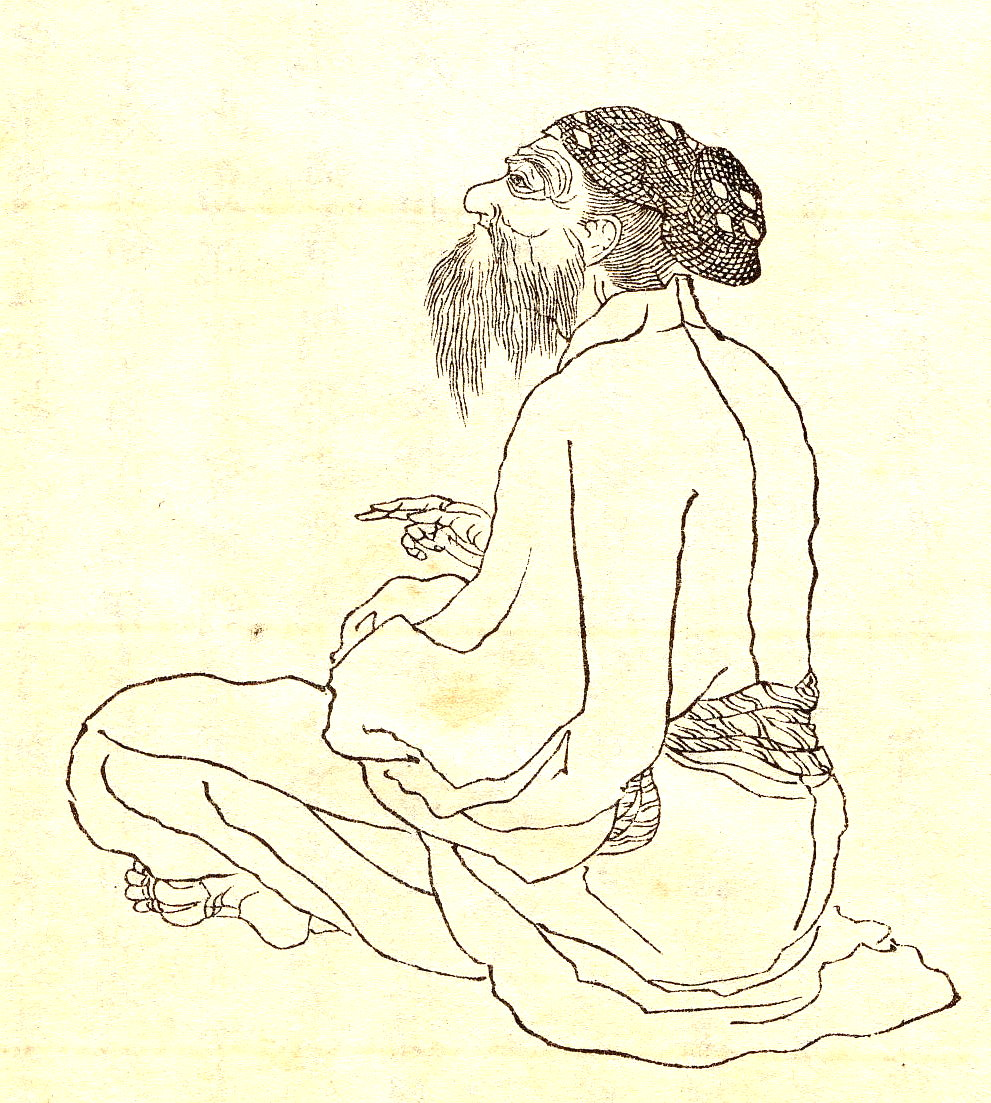
- Funya no Kiyomi by Kikuchi Yōsai
- Born: Prince Chinu; 693
- Died: October 9, 770 (aged 78)
- Occupations: Royal, nobleman

Funya no Kiyomi (文室 浄三; born Prince Chinu (智努王); 693 - October 9, 770) was a member of the Imperial Family of Japan, nobleman and politician during Asuka and Nara periods. He served as Major Counselor (Gyoshitaifu) in the Imperial Court and held the court rank of Junior Second Rank. He was the son of Prince Naga and the grandson of Emperor Tenmu.

== Life ==
Prince Chinu was born in 693 as the son of Prince Naga, the son of Emperor Tenmu, during the reign of Empress Jitō.

In 717, Prince Chinu received the court rank of Junior Fourth Rank, and in 740, he advanced to Senior Fourth Rank.

After serving as Head of Bureau of Carpentry (Moku no Kami), Minister of Imperial Palace Construction (Zōgūkyō), and Head of Bureau of Imperial Villa Construction (Zōrikyūshi), he was given Junior Third Rank in 747.

In 752, he received the surname Funya and the kabane Mahito. In 757, he became Sangi and advanced to the court rank of Junior Second Rank and Gyoshitaifu (later known as Dainagon).

After the death of Empress Kōken, he received support to become the crown prince but declined the offer.

Funya no Kiyomi died on October 9, 770 at the age of 78.

== Family ==
- Father: Prince Naga
- Mother: Unknown
- Wife: Princess Matta (Lord of Matta)
- Children of unknown birth mother
  - Son: Prince Sawa
  - Son: Funya no Yoki
  - Son: Funya no Mayamaro
  - Ninth son: Mimuro no Ōhara (? - 806)
  - Daughter: Queen Okaya
