= Princess Izumi =

Japanese princess

Princess Izumi 泉皇女

Saiō
- Tenure: 701 – 706
- Predecessor: Princess Taki
- Successor: Princess Takata
- Died: March 17, 734
- House: Imperial House of Japan
- Father: Emperor Tenji
- Mother: Lady Shikobuko
- Religion: Shinto

Princess Izumi (泉皇女, Izumi no himemiko; died March 17, 734) (Note: Date is 8th day of the 2nd month of the 6th year of the 天平 (Tenpyō) Era, equivalent of March 17, 734.) was a person in Japan during the Asuka period and the Nara period. She was a daughter of Emperor Tenji and Lady Shikobuko, whose father was Oshimi no Miyakko Otatsu. She had an elder brother, Prince Kawashima, and an elder sister, Princess Ōe.

Although her sister, Princess Ōe, and other half-sisters were married to Emperor Tenmu or his sons, Izumi did not marry because she was too young. When she reached the age suitable for marriage, she could not marry because there were no appropriate men among Emperor Tenmu's sons.

Additionally, her brother Prince Kawashima betrayed Prince Ōtsu and his followers, and they were all punished; Prince Kawashima and his relatives became the targets of criticism. After Prince Kawashima and Princess Ōe died several years later, she was completely isolated.

She was selected by divination as the Saiō in 701 when she was in her thirties, because the Saio of that year, Princess Taki, was suddenly dismissed. In principle, a newly selected Saio was supposed to make preparation by staying in the Abstinence-house near the capital for two years prior to going to Ise. However, she was in the Abstinence-house for over five years from 701 to 706. Also, she stayed in the Saikū in Ise for only half a year and was made to retire from the post. These unprecedented cases might be because of some political intentions.

She was almost 40 years old when she returned to the capital. She could not marry anyone as she became too old, so she lived an unmarried life until she died in 734 in her sixties.
