= Princess Tagata =

Japanese princess during Asuka period

- Born: 674
- Died: 728 (aged 53–54)
- Spouse: Prince Mutobe
- Issue: Princess Kasanui
- Father: Emperor Tenmu
- Mother: Soga no Ōnu-no-iratsume
- Occupation: Saiō

Princess Tagata (田形皇女; 674–728) was a Japanese princess during the Asuka period and Nara period of Japanese history. She was a daughter of Emperor Tenmu and Lady Ōnu, whose father was Soga no Akaye. Prince Hozumi was her older brother, and Princess Ki was her older sister. She was a Saiō.

== Life ==
Tagata took over the Saio's work from Princess Izumi on the 29th day of the eighth month in 706. Ten months later, she had to resign from the post and left Ise Grand Shrine on the 15th day of the 6th month, 707, due to Emperor Monmu's death. After that, she married Prince Mutobe and gave birth to Princess Kasanui (笠縫女王), who was later a great court poet. On the 6th day of the 2nd month in 724, the rank of Ni-hon was conferred on her.
