= Prince Nagaya =

Japanese prince (684–729)

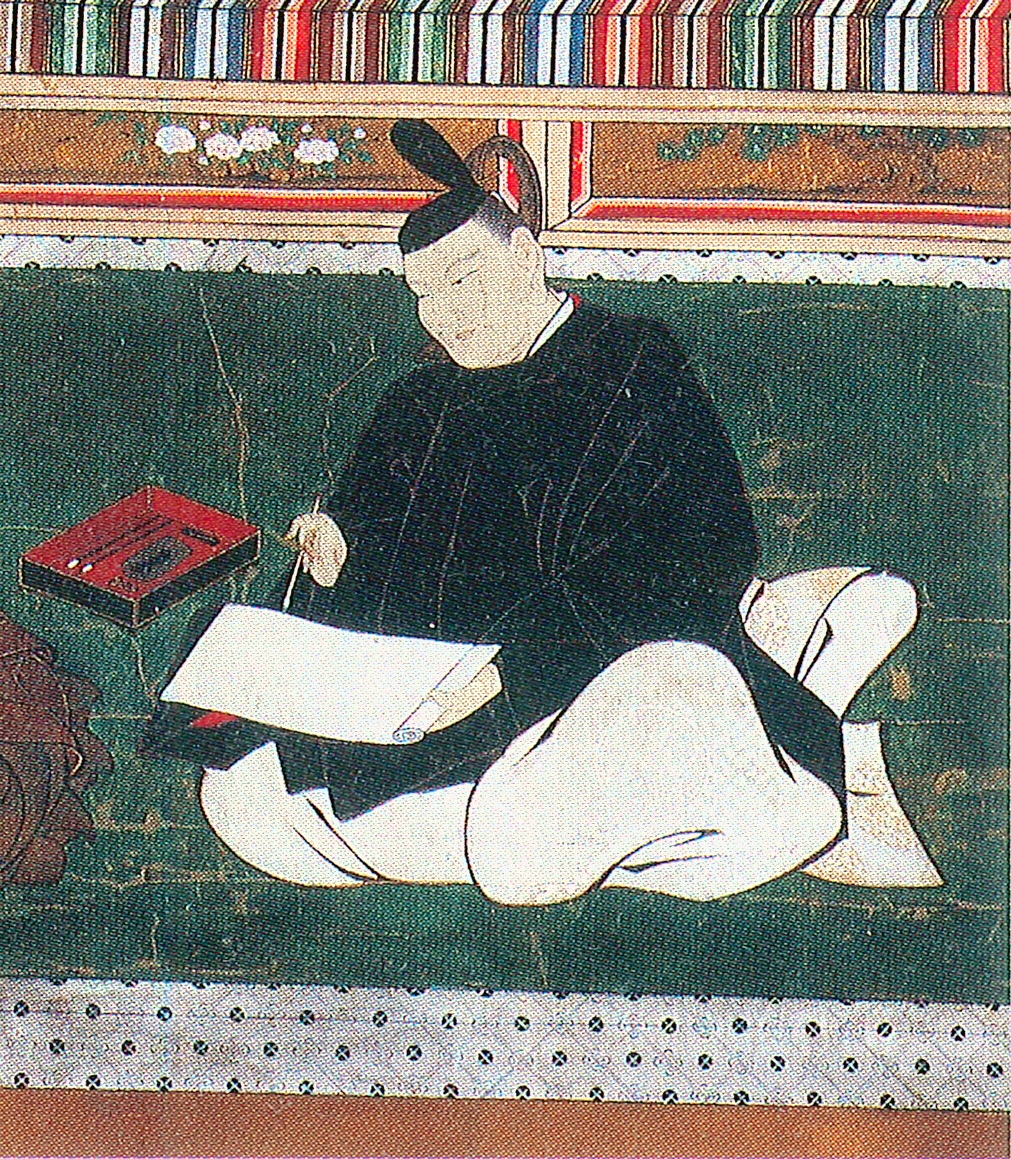
- Born: 684
- Died: 20 March 729 (aged 44–45); Nara, Japan
- Spouse: Princess Kibi (consort); a lady of Ishikawa clan; Fujiwara no Nagako; Abe no Ōtoji; Princess Chinu
- Issue: Prince Kashiwade; Prince Katsuragi; Prince Kagitori; Prince Kuwata; Prince Asukabe; Prince Kibumi; Prince Yamashiro (Fujiwara no Otosada); Princess Kyōshō; Princess Kamo; Princess Madokata
- Father: Prince Takechi
- Mother: Princess Minabe

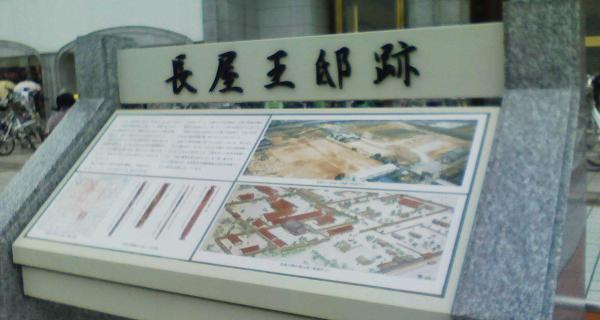
Nagaya's home site in Nara

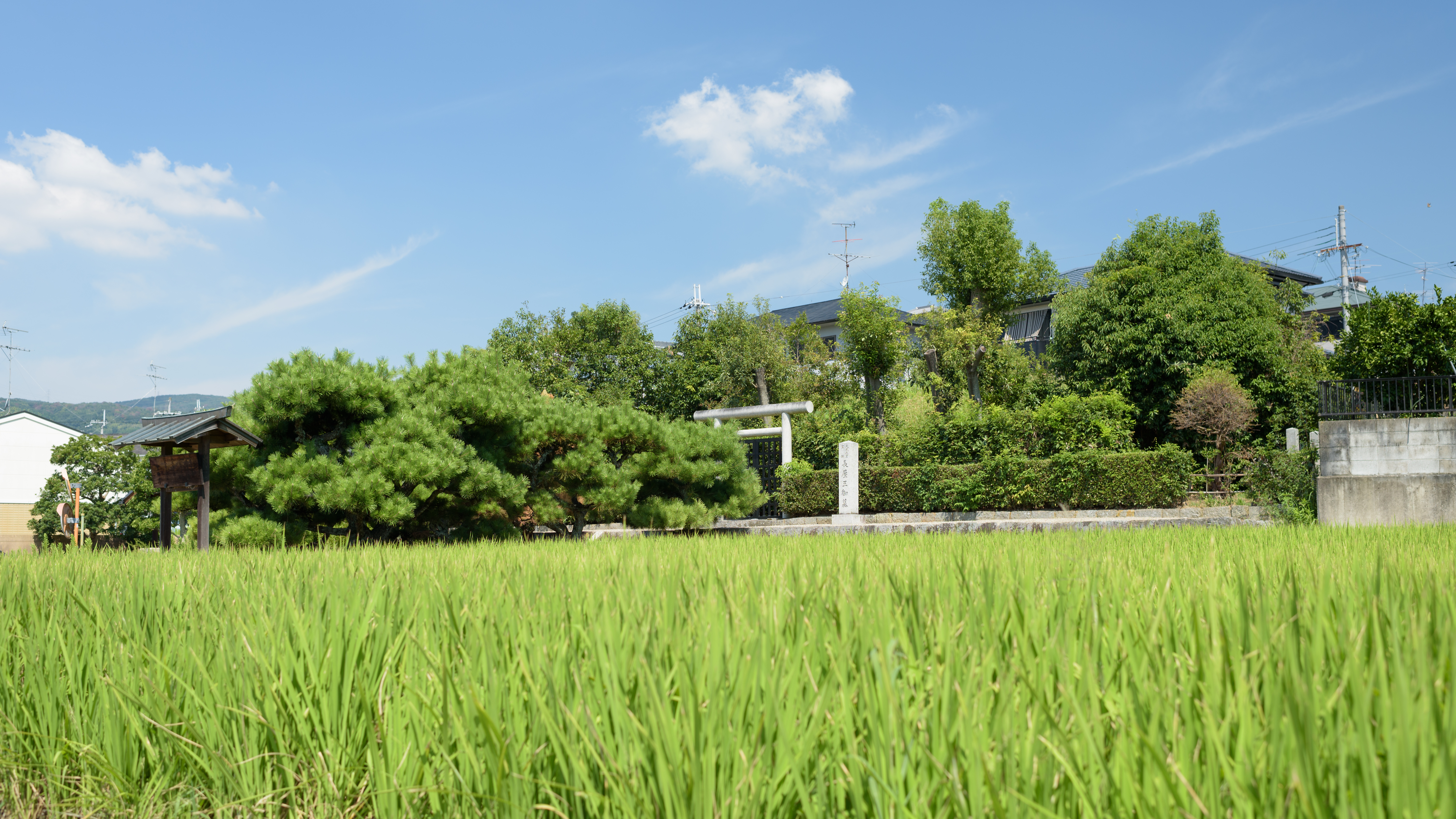
Tomb of Prince Nagaya in Heguri

Nagaya (長屋王 Nagaya-no-ōkimi) (684 – 20 March 729) was a politician of the Nara period and an imperial prince of Japan, a son of Prince Takechi (grandson of Emperor Tenmu).

His father was Prince Takechi and his mother Princess Minabe (a daughter of Emperor Tenji and Empress Genmei's sister). He married Princess Kibi (his cousin, a daughter of Empress Genmei and Empress Genshō's sister).

He was substantially influential in politics owing to his membership of the Imperial family of the most noble birth, and there were no other competitive Imperial members at that time. A large residence was allocated to him in a prestigious part of Heijō-kyō.

The Fujiwara clan were the most powerful competitors of Nagaya. Fujiwara no Fuhito, the leader of the house, had been the most powerful courtier in the court in the days when Japan was under the reign of Empress Genshō, a cousin of Nagaya's. After Fuhito's death in 720, Nagaya seized complete power within the court. This power shift was the source of later conflicts between him and Fuhito's four sons (Muchimaro, Fusasaki, Maro and Umakai) in the reign of Emperor Shōmu.

In 729, the four sons charged him with a false crime and Nagaya received the death penalty. He was forced to commit suicide. His wife, Princess Kibi, and his children were killed at the same time.

== Wives and children ==
Parents

- Father: Prince Takechi (高市皇子, Takechi no ōji, c. 654 – 13 August 696), Emperor Tenmu's son
- Mother: Princess Minabe (御名部皇女), Emperor Tenji's daughter

Consorts and issue

- Consort (Hi): Imperial Princess Kibi (吉備内親王, 686–729), Prince Kusakabe's daughter
  - Son: Prince Kashiwade (膳夫王, d. 16 March 729)
  - Son: Prince Katsuragi (葛木王, d. 729)
  - Son: Prince Kagitori (鉤取王, d. 729)
- Consort (Hi): Lady Ishikawa (石川夫人), daughter of Ishikawa no Mushina (石川虫名)
  - Second Son: Prince Kuwata (桑田王, d.729)
- Consort (Hi): Fujiwara no Nagako (藤原長娥子), daughter of Fujiwara no Fuhito (藤原不比等)
  - Fifth Son: Prince Asukabe (安宿王)
  - Son: Prince Kibumi (黄文王, d. 757)
  - Son: Prince Yamashiro (Fujiwara no Otosada) (藤原 弟貞, d. 17 October 763)
  - Daughter: Princess Kyōshō (教勝), a nun
- Consort (Hi): Abe no Ōtoji (安倍大刀自), daughter of Abe no Hironiwa (安倍広庭)
  - Daughter: Princess Kamo (賀茂女王)
- Unknown mother
  - Son: Prince Kurihara (栗原王)
  - Son: Prince Ankun (安君王)
  - Son: Prince Asazuma (朝妻王)
  - Daughter: Princess Chinu (智努女王)
  - Daughter: Princess Madokata (円方女王, d. 27 January 774)
  - Daughter: Princess Oshimi (忍海女王)
  - Daughter: Princess Ki (紀女王)

== Nagaya's Curse ==
It is said that, as Prince Nagaya was forced to die unreasonably, he bore a grudge against the living after his death. The following are believed to have been the victims of Nagaya's curse:

Muchimaro, Fusasaki, Maro and Umakai, responsible for the prince's death, caught smallpox one after another and eventually all of them died during a major Japanese smallpox epidemic in 737.

- In 1988, the former site of Nagaya's residence was discovered with many wooden tablets and historic relics on the construction site of a Sogo department store. Sogo did not care and continued construction. Twelve years after the store's completion, Sogo went bankrupt.
