= Prince Toneri =

Son of emperor Temmu; father of emperor Junnin (676-735)

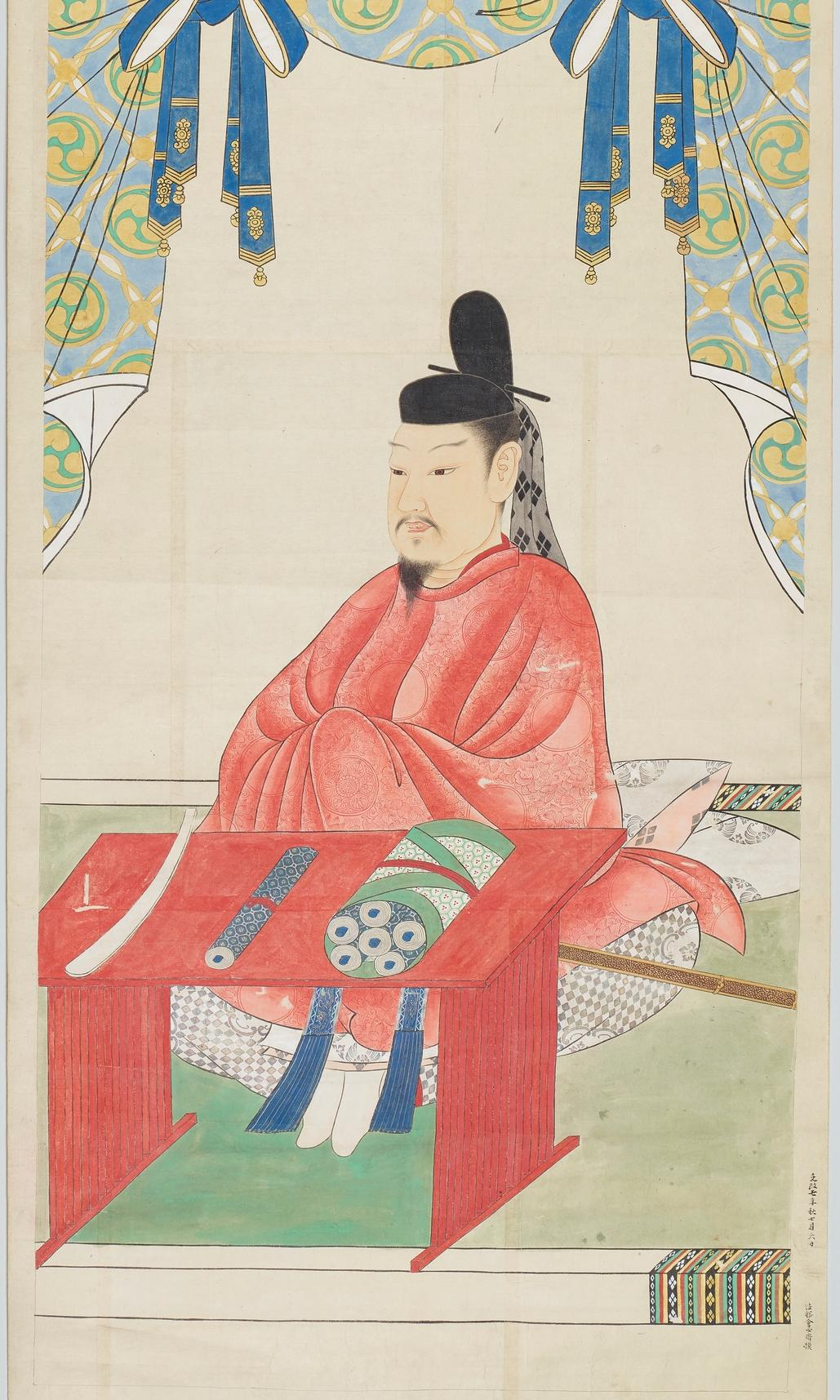
- Born: 28 January 676
- Died: 6 December 735 (aged 59)
- Spouse: Tagima-no-Yamashiro
- Issue: Prince Moribe; Prince Mihara; Prince Fune; Prince Ikeda; Prince Mishima; Emperor Junnin; Prince Miura
Posthumous name
- Emperor Sudoujinkei (崇道尽敬皇帝)
- House: Yamato
- Father: Emperor Tenmu
- Mother: Niitabe

Prince Toneri (舎人親王, Toneri shinnō) (January 28, 676 – December 6, 735) was a Japanese imperial prince in the Nara period. He was a son of Emperor Tenmu. He was given the posthumous name Emperor Sudoujinkei (崇道尽敬皇帝, Sudōjinkei Kōtei), as the father of Emperor Junnin. In the beginning of the Nara period, he gained political power as a leader of the Imperial family together with Prince Nagaya. He supervised the compilation of the Nihon Shoki.

== Genealogy ==
Prince Toneri was a son of Emperor Tenmu. Toneri's mother was Princess Nītabe, who was a daughter of Emperor Tenji.

His consort was Taima-no-Yamashiro (or Tagima-no-Yamashiro) and he had many sons: Princes Mihara, Mishima, Fune (or Funa), Ikeda, Moribe, Miura and Ōi (later Emperor Junnin).

Although he was plagued, he survived and lived longest among the sons of Emperor Tenmu.

Some of his descendants (known as the Kiyohara clan) took the Kiyohara surname. Examples include Kiyohara no Natsuno, who was the grandson of Prince Mihara, Kiyohara no Fukayabu, Kiyohara no Motosuke and his daughter, Sei Shōnagon.

=== Family ===
Parents

- Father: Emperor Tenmu (天武天皇, c. 631 – 1 October 686)
- Mother: Princess Niitabe (新田部皇女), Emperor Tenji’s daughter

Consorts and issues

- Consort (Hi): Tagima no Yamashiro (当麻山背)
  - Seventh Son: Prince Ōi (大炊王, 733 – 10 November 765), later Emperor Junnin (淳仁天皇)
- Consort (Hi): Lady Toma (当麻氏)
  - Third Son: Prince Fune (船王)
- Unknown Mother
  - First son: Prince Mihara (三原王, d. 2 August 752), descend of the Kiyowara clan (清原氏)
  - Second Son: Prince Moshima (三島王)
  - Fourth Son: Prince Ikeda (池田王)
  - Fifth Son: Prince Moribe (守部王)
  - Sixth Son: Prince Miura (御浦王)
  - First Daughter: Princess Muri (室女王, d. 4 December 759)
  - Second Daughter: Princess Asukata (飛鳥田女王, 23 July 783)

== In popular culture ==
The character Toneri Otsutsuki in The Last: Naruto the Movie is named after Prince Toneri.

== Ancestry ==
Ancestors of Prince Toneri

16. Emperor Bidatsu (538-585)
8. Prince Oshisakanohikohito-no-Ōe
17. Hiro-hime (d. c. 575)
4. Emperor Jomei (593-641)
18. Emperor Bidatsu (538-585)
9. Princess Nukate-hime (c. 570-664)
19. Unako no Otoshi
2. Emperor Tenmu (c. 631-686)
20. Prince Oshisakanohikohito-no-Ōe
10.Prince Chinu
21. Princess Nukate-hime (c. 570-664)
5. Empress Kōgyoku/Empress Saimei (594-661)
22. Sakurai no Miko (560-587)
11. Princess Kibitsu-hime (d. 643)
1. Prince Toneri
12. Emperor Jomei (593-641)
6. Emperor Tenji (626-672)
13. Empress Kōgyoku/Empress Saimei (594-661)
3. Princess Niitabe (d. 699)
28. Abe no Tori (d. 6??)
14. Abe no Uchimaro (d. 649)
7. Abe no Tachibana-no-iratsume (d. 681)
