= Princess Tajima =

Japanese princess (d. 708)

- Died: 708; Fujiwara-kyō, Japan
- Spouse: Prince Takechi
- House: Imperial House of Japan
- Father: Emperor Tenmu
- Mother: Fujiwara no Hikami-no-iratsume

Princess Tajima (但馬皇女, Tajima no himemiko) (died 708) was the daughter of Emperor Tenmu of Japan. Her mother was Lady Higami (氷上娘), whose father was Fujiwara no Kamatari, who co-worked with Emperor Tenji when they slew Soga no Iruka in the Taika Reform in 645.

== Marriage ==
Tajima was married to Prince Takechi by the Emperor's order, but she was not happy with him because he was much older than she was and looked like her father. She secretly loved her half-brother, Prince Hozumi. Some of her poems suggesting her love of him were collected in the Man'yōshū. One is about her longing for him, while another mentions the disapproval her affair with him caused when it became public knowledge. She died in 708, possibly suicide. Her grave site is located on the hill of Ikai at Yonabari near Hatususe.

After her death in 708, he produced a lament poem on her, which was also collected in the Man'yōshū.

== Sources ==
- Hiroaki Sato (2008). Japanese women poets: an anthology. M.E. Sharpe, Inc.
