= Princess Minabe =

- Spouse: Prince Takechi
- Issue: Prince Nagaya; Prince Suzuka
- Father: Emperor Tenji
- Mother: Soga no Mei-no-iratsume

Princess Minabe (御名部皇女, Minabe no himemiko) (? – ?) was a member of the royal family in Japan during the Asuka period. She was a daughter of Emperor Tenji. Her mother was Lady Mei (姪娘), daughter of Soga no Kurayamada no Ishikawa no Maro (蘇我倉山田石川麻呂). She was the elder sister of Princess Abe.

She married Prince Takechi and had two sons: Prince Nagaya and Prince Suzuka. The two princes were successful in Japan's aristocratic society several decades later.
