= Miyataki Site =

National Historic Site in Yoshino, Nara Prefecture Japan

- 宮滝遺跡 (Japanese)
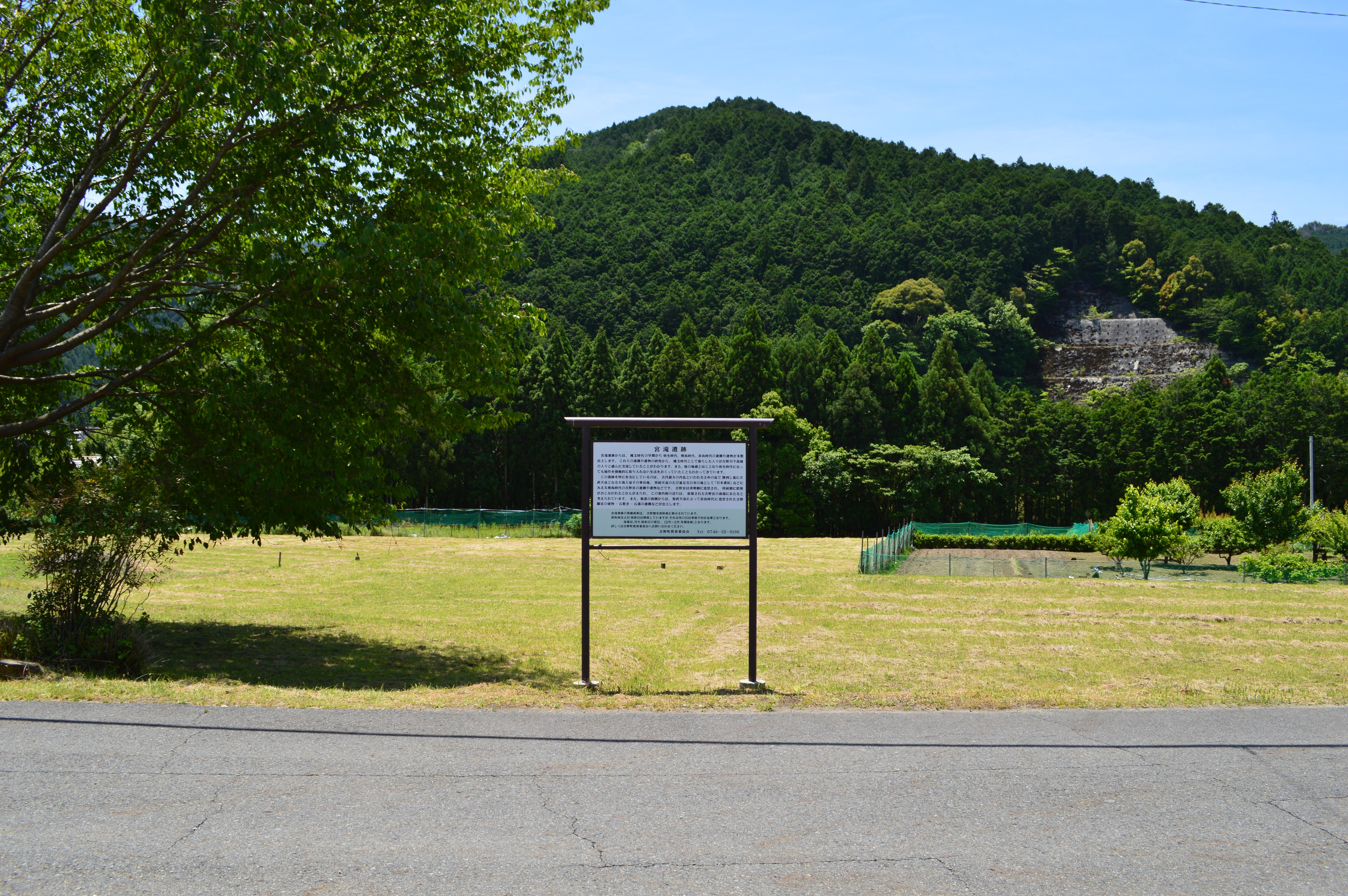
- Miyataki Site

- Miyataki Site Miyataki Site (Japan)
- Interactive map of Miyataki Site
- 34°22′37.9″N 135°53′35.9″E
- Type: Settlement
- Periods: Jōmon - Nara period
- Location: Yoshino, Nara, Japan
- Region: Kansai region

Site notes
- Public access: Yes

The Miyataki Site (宮滝遺跡, Miyataki iseki) is a complex archaeological site with traces from the Jōmon, Yayoi and early Nara periods, located in the Miyataki neighborhood of the town of Yoshino, Nara Prefecture Japan. It was designated a National Historic Site of Japan in 1924.

== Overview ==
The Miyataki site located on a river terrace 570 meters east-to-west and 300 meters north-to-south formed on the north bank of the meandering part of the Yoshino River upstream of the Kino River. Archaeological excavations from 1930 to 1939, and almost annual excavations since 1975, have been carried out to reveal the full extent of the site. The site mainly consists of three periods: the late and final Jōmon period, the early and middle Yayoi period, and the Asuka and Nara period.

The Jōmon site is located on the southwest terrace near the Yoshino River, and is limited to an area of 100 x 100 meters. Items related to the Jōmon culture include pottery, stone axes, stone arrowheads, stone knives, and stone clubs.The layer containing Jōmon pottery is 50–90 cm below the present-day surface. The distinctive feature of the pottery from this site is the extensive use of conch shells to apply patterns. Some patterns are created by simply pressing the abdomen of the conch shell, while others are created by pressing the shell down and rotating it slightly to create a fan-shaped impression pattern. The concave lines on the surface of the pottery are also created using snail shells, rather than using a rod-shaped or spatula-shaped tool.

The Yayoi site is found over almost the entire area of the terrace, with the remains of at least ten pit dwellings on a slight rise in the center, and jar coffins and seven square moat graves distributed around the dwellings. These are the oldest known jar burials in the Kansai region of Japan. A small number of Yayoi pottery from the early Yayoi period and a large number of pottery from the middle Yayoi period have been excavated from these remains.No ground stone knives (rice harvesting tools) from the Yayoi period have been found, although chipped stone axes, which had been used since the Jōmon period, continued to be in use into the middle Yayoi period. The settlement rapidly declined around the latter half of the middle Yayoi period.

The Asuka and Nara period ruins are divided into three periods. Period I consists of two post-hole buildings built east and west, one of which is 2 x 6 bays or more and had eaves on the north side. The other building is located 60 meters southeast and is 2 x 4 bays in size. Period II has the most remains, concentrated slightly west of Period I. There are three post-hole buildings built north and south, one east and west, three rows of fences, and a stone ditch, and with the remnants of a garden. A pit excavated from the site has unearthed Sue ware and Haji ware bowls from the first half of the Nara period, and a round roof tile from the Nara period. The third period overlaps with a building from the second period. The foundation stones for large 9 by 5 bays building with has been confirmed, and this building was surrounded by paving stones. Large numbers of roof tiles were also found.

== Yoshino Palace ==
Although there are records of visits to Yoshino by Emperor Ojin and Emperor Yuryaku in the Nihon Shoki, it is not until the entry on the construction of Yoshino Palace in the second year of the reign of Empress Saimei (656) that it can be said with certainty that a detached palace existed. After Emperor Tenchi died, his younger brother Prince Ōama (later Emperor Tenmu) retired to Yoshino Palace with his wife Princess Uno and their son Prince Kusakabe, but later came into conflict with Prince Ōtomo and raised an army there (the Jinshin War). After Emperor Tenmu and Prince Kusakabe, who had become the crown prince, died, Princess Uno was forced to take the throne as Empress Jitō. She made 31 visits to Yoshino Palace during her reign, and also made another visit in 701 after her grandson Emperor Mommu abdicated. It is known that Emperor Mommu, Empress Genshō and Emperor Shōmu made further visits to Yoshino Palace. Period I of the Miyataki ruins corresponds to the reigns of Emperor Tenmu and Empress Jitō; Period II to around the reign of Emperor Shōmu; and Period III to the imperial visit of Emperor Uda in 898, and thus there is a strong possibility that these ruins correspond to the Yoshino Palace as described in literature.

== Gallery ==
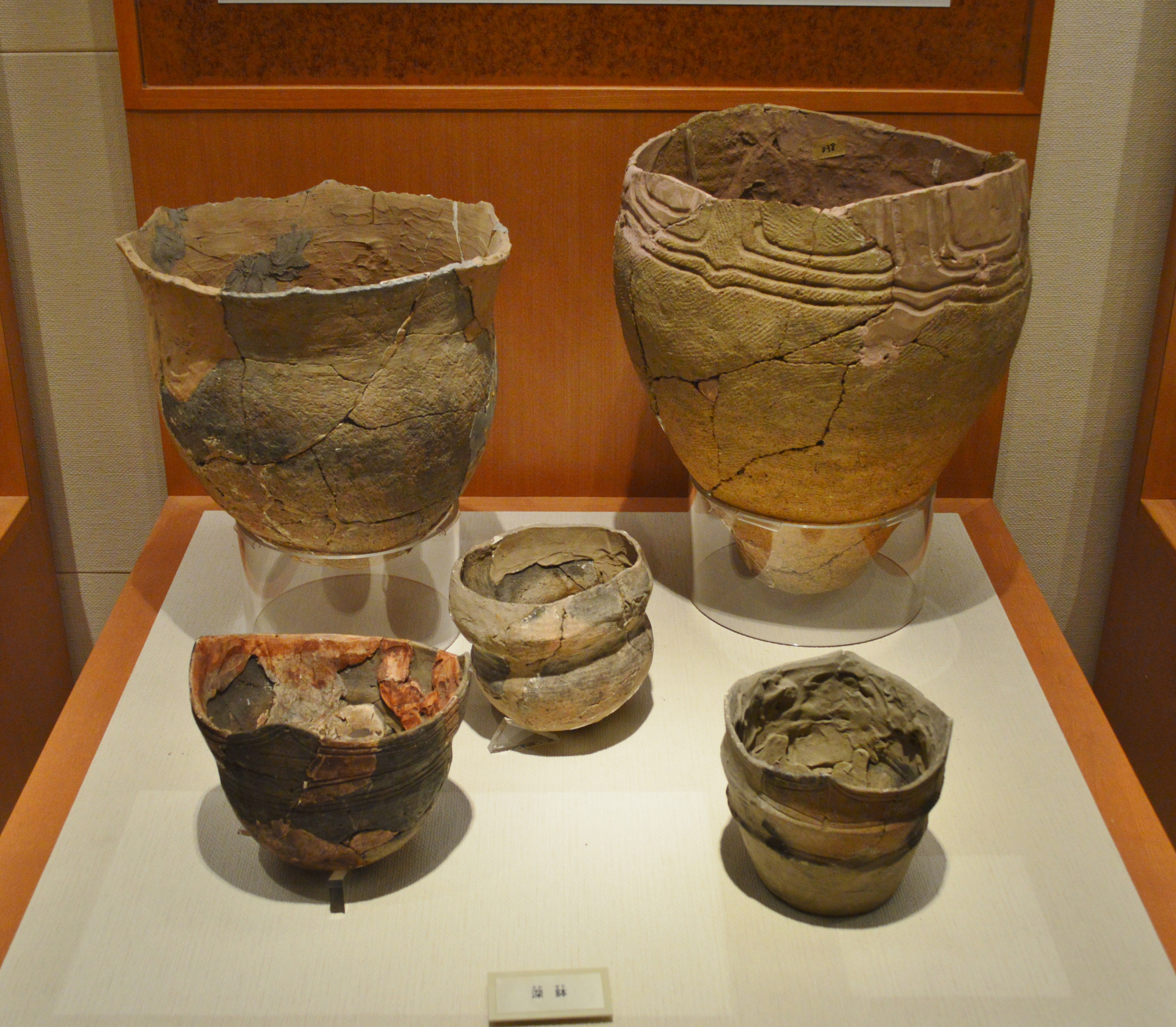
Jōmon pottery from Miyataki SIte

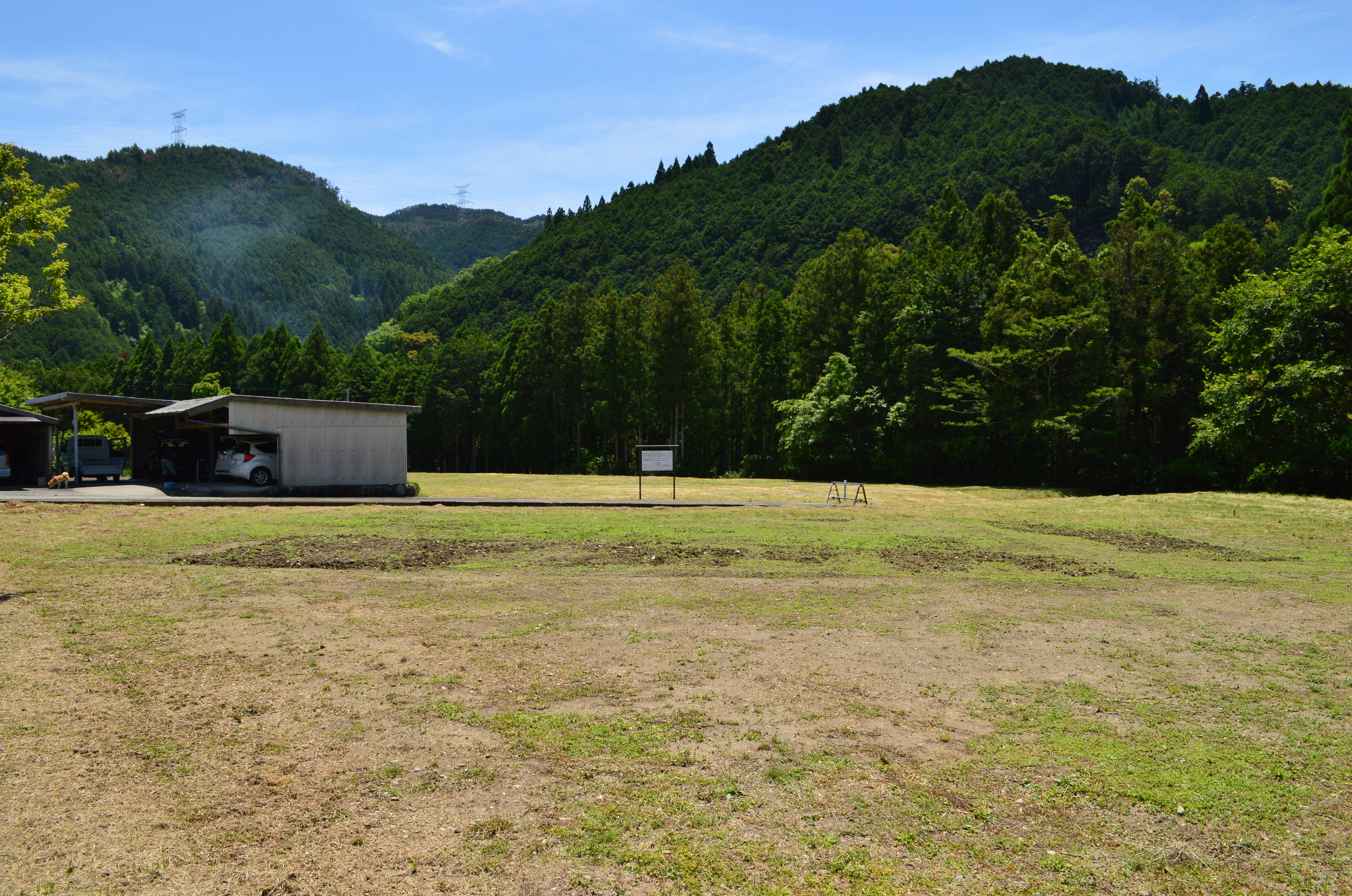
Possible location of Yoshino Palace

== See also ==
- List of Historic Sites of Japan (Nara)
