= Lady Ōnu =

Lady Ōnu (蘇我大蕤娘 Soga no Ōnu-no-iratsume; died 6 August 724) was a Japanese noblewoman. She was the daughter of Soga no Akae and consort to Emperor Tenmu, with whom she had three children.

Her children with the emperor were:

- Prince Hozumi (穂積皇子) (d. 715)
- Princess Ki (紀皇女) (?–?)
- Princess Takata (田形皇女) (d. 728), Saiō in Ise Shrine (706–707), and married to Prince Mutobe later
