= Princess Niitabe =

Princess Niitabe (新田部皇女, Niitabe no himemiko) (died 699) was a daughter of Emperor Tenji in Japan during the Asuka Period. Her mother was Lady Tachibana, whose father was Abe no Kurahashi Maro. Her elder sister was Princess Asuka.

She was a consort (妃, Hi) of Emperor Tenmu. One of her sons, Prince Toneri, was promoted in the Imperial Court.
