= Princess Asuka =

- Born: Unknown
- Died: April 27, 700
- Spouse: Prince Osakabe
- Father: Emperor Tenji

Princess Asuka (明日香皇女, Asuka no himemiko) (died 700) was a Japanese princess during the Asuka Period. She was a daughter of Emperor Tenji. Her mother was Lady Tachibana, whose father was Abe no Kurahashi Maro.

Although few episodes about her are recorded in the chronicles, she seemed to be a person of considerably high position, because it is recorded that, when she became ill, Empress Jitō visited her, and that Kakinomoto no Hitomaro, a famous poet in this period, produced a long lament poet for her when she died on the 4th day of the 4th month in 700.

== Links ==
Imperial House of Japan
