= Prince Naga =

Japanese prince

Prince Naga (長皇子; d. 9 July 715) was a Japanese prince. He was the son of Emperor Tenmu and Princess Ōe, daughter of Emperor Tenji. His full brother was Prince Yuge.

== Career ==
In the seventh year of Emperor Jito's rule (693) together with his brother Prince Yuge, he was conferred the rank of Kiyohiro 2 (equivalent to Sanhon). He became Nihon through the transition to the court rank system accompanying the enactment of the Taiho Code in 701.

Later, from the Monmu Dynasty to the Gen Ming Dynasty, 200 fudo were given in the first year of Keiun (704) and the seventh year of Wado (714). Among the princes of Emperor Tenmu, he had good lineage with his grandfather being Emperor Tenchi, and it was possible that he would be appointed Chidajokanji after Imperial Prince Hozumi, but he was appointed a month before Imperial Prince Hozumi. In the eighth year of the Wado era (715), he died on June 4. Though his age at death is unknown, judging from the timing of the birth of his daughter Princess Chinu, it is estimated that he was in his mid-forties to early fifties.

There is a theory that he was buried in the Kitora Tomb.

== Family ==
Parents

- Father: Emperor Tenmu (天武天皇, c. 631 – 1 October 686)
- Mother: Princess Ōe (大江皇女), Emperor Tenji’s daughter
  - Full Brother: Prince Yuge (弓削皇子, 673 – 21 August 699)

Consort and issues

- Unknown wife
  - First Son: Prince Kawachi (河内王, d. 733)
  - Second Son: Prince Kurisu (栗栖王, 682 – 6 November 753)
  - Third Son: Prince Chinu (智努王), later Funya no Kiyomi (文室 浄三, 693 – 9 October 770)
  - Fourth Son: Prince Ishikawa (石川王)
  - Fifth Son: Prince Nagata (長田王)
  - Sixth Son: Prince Oichi (大市王, 704 – 28 December 780) later Bunko Oichi (文室大市)
  - Seventh Son: Prince Nara (奈良王)
  - Eight Son: Prince Kayanuma (茅沼王)
  - Ninth Son: Prince Atoda (阿刀王, d. 22 July 763)
  - First Daughter: Princess Hirose (広瀬女王, d. 9 November 765)
  - Second Daughter: Princess Chinu (智努女王)
