= Prince Shiki =

Son of emperor Tenji (died 716)

- Born: Unknown
- Died: 1 September 716; Japan
- Spouse: Princess Taki; Ki no Tochihime
- Issue: Prince Kasuga; Prince Yuhara; Imperial Princess Namba; Prince Shirakabe; Prince Enai; Prince Ichi; Princess Kaijō; Princess Kinunui; Princess Sakaibe
Posthumous name
- 春日宮御宇天皇; Emperor Kasuga
- Father: Emperor Tenji
- Mother: Koshi-no-michi no Iratsume

Prince Shiki (志貴皇子, Shiki-no-miko, died 1 September 716), posthumously known as Emperor Kasuga (春日宮天皇), was a member of the royal family in Japan during the Asuka period.

== Biography ==
Prince Shiki was the seventh son of Emperor Tenji. The prince led a life devoted to cultural fields such as waka poetry, rather than to politics. However, after his death, his sixth son, Prince Shirakabe married Princess Inoe and ascended the throne with the support of many ministers.

He was buried in Tawara Nishi tomb of the Imperial Mausoleum in Nara.

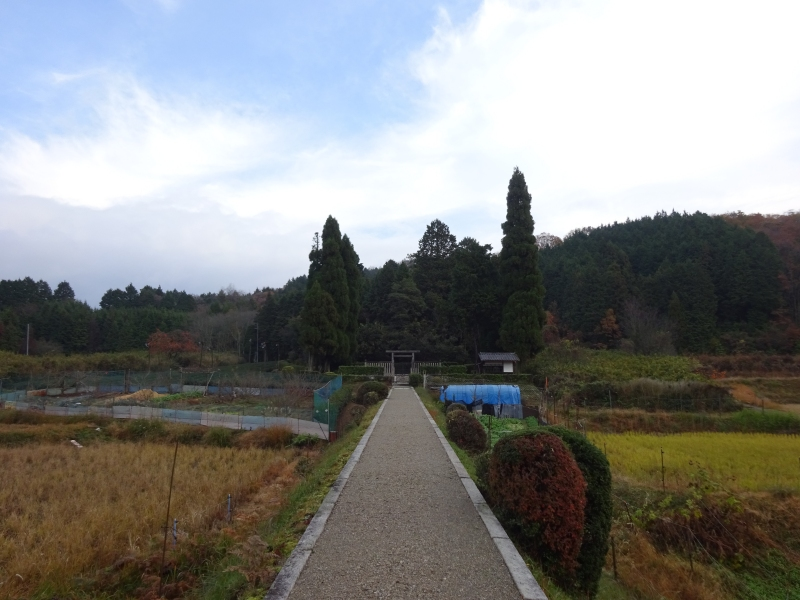
Emperor Kasuga Tomb

== Family ==
Parents

- Father: Emperor Tenji (天智天皇, 626 – January 7, 672)
- Mother: Court Lady Koshi-no-michi no Iratsume (越道伊羅都売)

Consort and issue(s):

- Consort (Hi): Princess Taki (託基皇女/多紀皇女, d. 25 February 751), daughter of Emperor Tenmu
  - Son: Prince Kasuga (春日王, d. 2 June 745)
  - Son: Prince Yuhara (湯原王)
- Concubine: Ki no Tochihime (紀橡姫, d. 21 October 709), daughter of Ki no Shite (紀諸人)
  - Daughter: Imperial Princess Nanba (難波内親王, d. 3 November 773)
  - Son: Prince Shirakabe (白壁王, 18 November 708 – 11 January 782 ), later Emperor Kōnin
- Concubine: Unknown women
  - Son: Prince Enai (榎井王)
  - Son: Prince Ichi (壱志王)
  - Daughter: Princess Kaijō (海上女王)
  - Daughter: Princess Kinunui (衣縫内親王, d. 12 August 772)
  - Daughter: Imperial Princess Sakaibe (坂合部内親王, d. 27 June 778)

== Poems ==
Prince Shiki wrote many poems during his lifetime. Below are two examples of his work.

A poem composed by Prince Shiki after he moved from Asakura Palace to Fujiwara Palace.

Uneme no/Sode fukikaesu /
Asukakaze/Miyako o tōmi/Itazura nu fuku.

Winds of Asuka
Blowing back the weaving sleeves
Of palaces women—
Now the capital is far,
And you blow in vain.

A Poem composed by Prince Shiki when he visited Naniwa Palace (706)

Ashibe yuku/Kamo no hagai ni/Shimi furite/Samuke yūke wa/Yamato shi omōyu

In among the reeds
Go to mallards through the frost
Falling on their wings:
Cold twilight, the still hour
Of longing for Yamato.
