= Prince Hozumi =

Japanese prince (d. 715)

Prince Hozumi (穂積親王, Hozumi Shinnō, d. 30 August 715) was a Japanese prince, the fifth son of Emperor Tenmu, who lived from the Asuka to Nara periods. He was the first child of the emperor and Soga no Ōnu-no-iratsume, who later had two daughters together as well. After the death of his half-sister Princess Tajima in 708, with whom he had had a tryst, he married the poet Ōtomo no Sakanoe no Iratsume. Four of his poems (plus many by his wife and Tajima) are included in the Man'yōshū, including a lament written after the death of the Princess. He had two sons.

Much of his early life is unknown. In 703, he was responsible for organising the funeral of Empress Jitō. He became Prime Minister in 705, taking over after the death of his half-brother Prince Osakabe. It has been speculated based on the Man'yōshū that he was banished to a mountain temple, Sūfukuji (崇福寺), in Ōmi, where he became a monk after the discovery of his affair with Princess Tajima, who was married to his older half-brother Prince Takechi.

== Family ==
Parents

- Father: Emperor Tenmu (天武天皇, c. 631 – 1 October 686
- Mother: Soga no Ōnu-no-iratsume (蘇我大蕤娘), Soga no Akae’s daughter

Consort and issues:

- Consort (Hi): Ōtomo no Sakanoue no Iratsume (大伴坂上郎女), daughter of Ōtomo no Yasumaro (大伴 安麻呂)
  - First Son: Prince Kamido (上道王, d. 28 April 727)
  - Second Son: Prince Sakaibe (境部王)
