= Princess Taki =

Princess Taki 託基皇女

Saiō
- Tenure: 698–701
- Predecessor: Princess Ōku
- Successor: Princess Izumi
- Died: February 25, 751
- Spouse: Prince Shiki
- Issue: Prince Kasuga
- House: Imperial house of Japan
- Father: Emperor Tenmu
- Mother: Princess Kaji

Princess Taki (託基皇女; d. February 25, 751) was a Japanese princess during the Asuka period of Japanese history. She was a daughter of Emperor Tenmu, a wife of Prince Shiki and the mother of Prince Kasuga. She was also a saiō.

== Genealogy ==
She was the daughter of Emperor Temmu and Lady Kajihime, whose father is Shishibito no Omi Ōmaro. Her siblings were Prince Osakabe, Princess Hatsusebe, and Prince Shiki.

The first record on her is that she visited Ise Jingū Shrine to see the saiō, Princess Ōku, in 686.

On the ninth month, tenth day of 698, she was selected by divination as the next saiō. The saiō system had been suspended since Princess Ōku resigned from the saiō in 686. Emperor Mommu wished to set up the system again and let a princess serve the Goddess of Ise at all times.

In the first month of 701, she was suddenly dismissed from the position of saiō. After she returned to the capital, she married Prince Shiki and gave birth to Prince Kasuga. She lived with her husband until he died in 716.

According to Nihon Shoki, she was conferred the rank of Ippon on the fourth month, 14th day of 749.
