= Prince Takechi =

Japanese prince (d. 696)

- Daijō Daijin of Japan
- Born: c. 654
- Died: 13 August 696 (aged 41–42); Fujiwara-kyō, Japan
- Spouse: Princess Minabe (consort); Princess Tajima
- Issue: Prince Nagaya; Prince Suzuka; Prince Kadobe; Princess Yamagata; Princess Kawachi; Princess Hinokuma
- Father: Emperor Tenmu
- Mother: Munakata no Amako-no-iratsume

Prince Takechi (高市皇子, Takechi no miko, Takechi no ōji; c. 654 – 13 August 696) was a member of the royal family in Japan during the Asuka period.

Prince Takechi was the eldest son of Emperor Tenmu.

== Life ==
Prince Takechi fought on the side of his father in the Jinshin War (672), a battle of succession, which resulted in his father becoming Emperor.

At the age of 19, he was dispatched by his father to the battle front in what is now Fuwa District, Mino Province (now the southern part of Gifu Prefecture) as vanguard and general commander.

In 679, while in Yoshino with his father, he swore to an oath of cooperation with his siblings. When Empress Jitō ascended to the throne in 686 he became the Daijō-daijin and handled government affairs. He died suddenly in 696 - his death is thought by some to have been an assassination.

Prince Takechi loved Princess Tōchi (his elder half-sister, Prince Ōtomo's wife). He left only three waka poems during his whole life, but they were all poetry offered to her.

== Family ==
Parents

- Father: Emperor Tenmu (天武天皇, c. 631 – 1 October 686)
- Mother: Munakata no Amako-no-iratsume (胸形尼子娘), unakata-no-Kimi Tokuzen's daughter

Consorts and issues

- Consort (Hi): Princess Minabe (御名部皇女), Emperor Tenji's daughter and Empress Genmei's full-sister
  - First Son: Prince Nagaya (長屋王, 684 – 20 March 729)
  - Second Son: Prince Suzuka (鈴鹿王, d. 3 October 745)
- Consort (Hi): Princess Tajima (但馬皇女), Emperor Tenmu's daughter and Prince Takechi's half-sister
- Unknown mother
  - Third Son: Prince Kadobe (門部王)
  - First Daughter: Princess Yamagata (山形女王, d. 5 October 745)
  - Second Daughter: Princess Kawachi (河内女王, d. 5 February 780)
  - Third Daughter: Princess Hinokuma (檜前女王)
