= Princess Ōe =

Princess Ōe (大江皇女, Ōe no himemiko) (died 699) was a Japanese princess who lived during the Asuka period. She was a daughter of Emperor Tenji. Her mother was Lady Shikobuko (色夫古娘), daughter of Oshiumi no Miyakko Otatsu (忍海造小竜). Ōe's siblings included Prince Kawashima and Princess Izumi.

Ōe married Emperor Tenmu and gave birth to two sons: Prince Naga and Prince Yuge. After Emperor Tenmu's death, they were qualified to become the next Emperor, but neither did.
