= Prince Yuge =

- Prince of Japan
- Born: Yuge 弓削皇子
- Died: August 21, 669
- Father: Emperor Tenmu
- Mother: Ōe

Prince Yuge (Japanese: 弓削皇子, d. August 21, 699) was a Japanese prince and waka poet. He was the sixth son of Emperor Tenmu, by Princess Ōe, daughter of Emperor Tenji. His full brother was Prince Naga.

Man'yōshū poems 111, 119, 120, 121, 122, 242, 1467 and 1608 are attributed to him.

He died on the twenty-first day of the seventh month of the third year of Emperor Monmu's reign (August 21, 699). He is one of the candidates for the Takamatsuzuka Tomb.
