= Jinshin War =

672 succession war in Japan

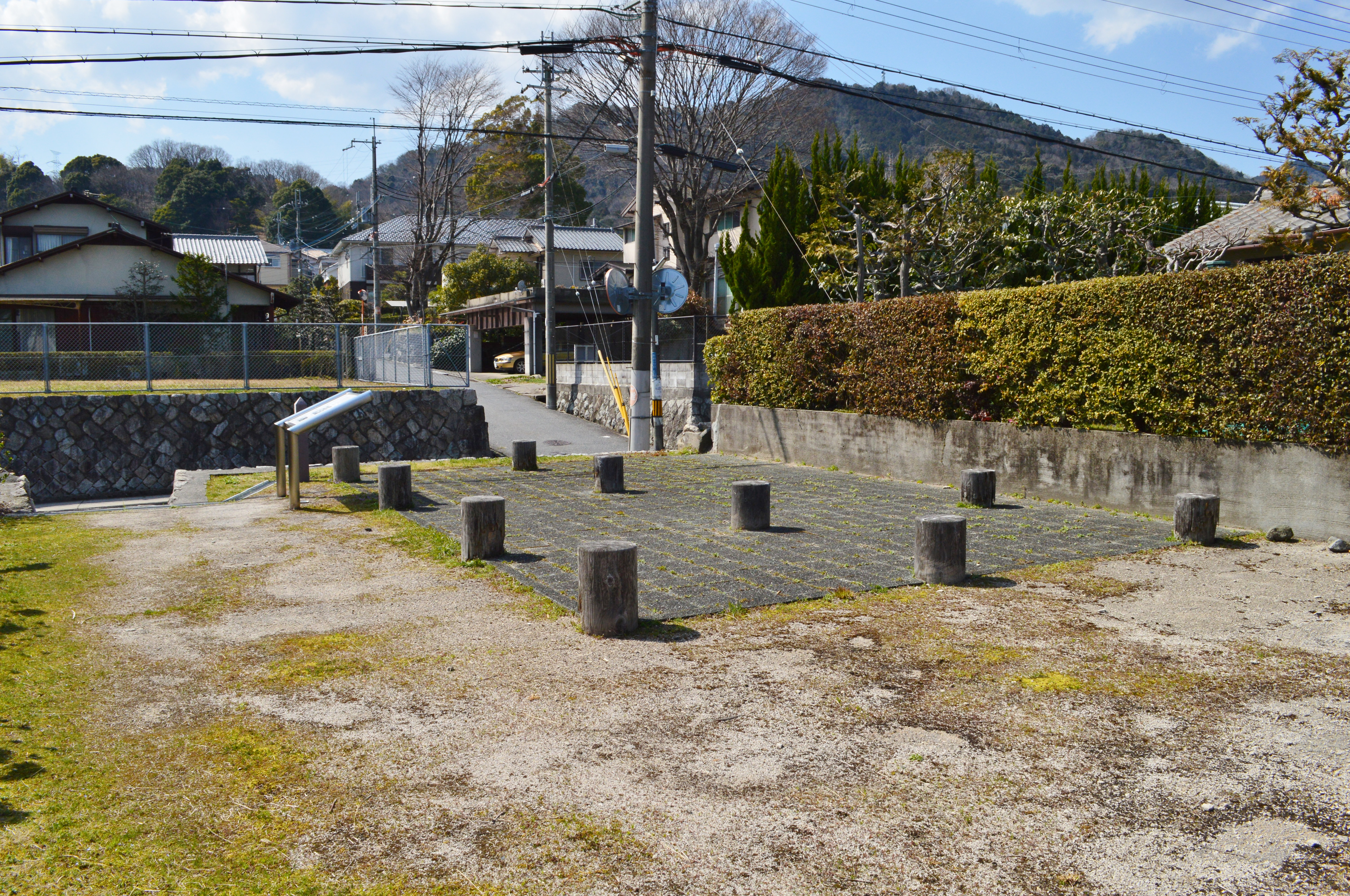
- A section of the Ōmi Ōtsu Palace ruins in modern day Ōtsu, Shiga Prefecture
Date	July 24 - August 21, 672
Location	Ōmi, Mino, Ise, Iga and Yamato provinces
Result	Ōama victory

Belligerents
Prince Ōama's forces	Court of Ōmi Ōtsu Palace

Commanders and leaders
Prince Ōama (Emperor Tenmu)	Prince Ōtomo (Emperor Kōbun) †

Strength
20,000 to 30,000 soldiers	20,000 to 30,000 soldiers

Casualties and losses
Unknown	Unknown

The Jinshin War (壬申の乱, jinshin no ran) was a war of succession that took place in the Yamato Kingship near the end of Asuka period. It broke out in 672 following the death of Emperor Tenji. The name refers to the jinshin (Ch. renshen 壬申) or ninth year of the sexagenary cycle, corresponding to the Gregorian year 672. It was one of the largest conflicts in classical Japanese history.

Tenji had designated his brother, Prince Ōama, as his successor, but later changed his mind in favor of his son, Prince Ōtomo. In the course of the violence that erupted as a result of factional rivalries, Ōtomo, having taken the throne as Kōbun, killed himself after reigning for less than a year. His uncle Ōama then succeeded to the throne as Emperor Tenmu. Tenmu was the first monarch of Japan contemporaneously documented as using the title Emperor of Japan (天皇, Tennō)

== Background ==
After the defeat of Baekje and their Yamato allies by Silla and Tang China in the Battle of Baekgang, Emperor Tenji, in defiance of opposition from his retainers, moved his capital to Ōmi Ōtsu Palace (now in Ōtsu, Shiga Prefecture), and prepared to respond to the growing threat from East Asia. He attempted to build a stronger centralized state, mimicking the Tang's bureaucracy, importing their political systems and legal codes, consequently affecting Japanese culture as a whole. Emperor Tenji is credited with compiling the Ōmi Code, the first collection of Ritsuryō laws, widely regarded as the earliest legal codes in Japan. Japan was under a process of political unification by the Yamato clan, seeking to dissolve the powerful hegemony of local prestigious clans in the Uji clan system.

The next task Tenji needed to address was that of securing his successor. His empress consort, Yamato hime, had borne no children. He had to find a successor among the sons of non-imperial wives. Prince Takeru, the eldest son, was mute from birth and died at age seven. Prince Ōtomo was the next prince; he was considered to be diligent, brilliant and had enough ability to be the next emperor. Although Ōtomo was a strong candidate, he was not born into the Imperial Household. His mother was of low birth from a rural landlord's family. This was a significant disadvantage to Ōtomo's candidacy for the throne. However, there was another candidate who was as good as Ōtomo: the emperor's younger brother, Prince Ōama, who was equally capable and known for his martial prowess. His reputation was much greater than Ōtomo's because he was of higher birth. This was a major cause of the subsequent conflict.

In 670, Emperor Tenji grew ill. Realizing he would not live much longer, he wished that, after his death, the throne would pass to his favorite son, Prince Ōtomo, who was appointed as the first Daijō-daijin (Chancellor of the Realm) in 671. Because Ōtomo's greatest rival was Ōama, the emperor attempted to drive the younger brother away; he invited the prince to his bedroom and asked if Ōama had an intention to take the throne. If Ōama answered yes, the emperor would have arrested and punished him as a traitor. However, the prince was clever enough to see through the trick and answered that he had no will to succeed to the throne, preferring that Ōtomo be the next emperor. He added that he wanted to become a Buddhist monk instead of inheriting the throne and would retire to a temple in Yoshino, Nara. Because there were no reasons to punish Ōama, the emperor accepted the prince's proposal. The next day, Ōama departed for Yoshino along with Tenji's daughter, Uno no Sarara (the future Empress Jitō), to become a monk.

The emperor declared Ōtomo his successor. Ōtomo summoned six subjects to the emperor's bedroom and had them swear to help him in the presence of his father. Tenji assented, and several days later, he died.

== The War ==
After the emperor's death, Prince Ōtomo began his administrative activities as the new emperor. Soga no Akae (蘇我赤兄), Soga no Hatayasu (蘇我果安), Kose no Omi Hito (巨勢臣比等), Ki no Ushi (紀大人) and other subjects followed him.

Meanwhile, Prince Ōama pretended to be a monk at a temple in Yoshino, all the while looking for the opportunity to instigate a rebellion against his nephew and drive him away. He secretly began collecting weapons and soldiers. In June 672, after learning that the Ōmi court plotted to kill him, he raised an army and departed Yoshino, marching for the palace in Ōtsu, where the new emperor resided. He strengthened his army by rallying local clans as he advanced through Uda, Iga and Suzuka, many of whom were dissatisfied by reforms put into place by Ōtomo's father. On his way, he was reunited with his sons who had fled from Ōmi. His eldest son Prince Takechi notably distinguished himself during this conflict. To cut off reinforcements from the eastern provinces, Prince Ōama seized strategic checkpoints such as the Fuwa Barrier, controlling ingress to the Kinai region.

Many challenges stood in the way of Ōama's forces: in some counties, guerrilla attacks prevented their march forward for many days. Every time they faced such difficulties, however, they fought bravely and patiently, gaining supporters to their cause along the way.

Ultimately, the war lasted for about a month. The important old capital of Asuka, was seized by general Ōtomo no Fukei on behalf of Ōama. Then on August 22, the outnumbered Ōmi court forces made their final stand west of the Seta Bridge in Ōmi, but were defeated. After a desperate struggle, Ōama captured the capital. Prince Ōtomo escaped to Mount Nagara near the palace, where he strangled himself to death. The subjects who supported him were arrested by Ōama's troops, and were punished as criminals. Many ancient clans were destroyed or fell into obscurity as a result of the war.

The victor eventually burnt the capital down and returned to Asuka, where he built the Asuka-Kiyomihara Palace and married Empress Uno no Sarara. Ōama (Emperor Tenmu), then instituted political and military reforms that consolidated imperial power and centralized governance with the emperor at its core. He was notably the first monarch of Japan contemporaneously documented as using the title Tennō (emperor), Tenmu's predecessors were retroactively given the title by later generations.

== Events in the War ==
The following dates are given in accordance with the Julian Calendar.

- June AD 672: Prince Ōtomo commands the governors of the provinces of Mino and Owari to allow for the assignment of laborers for the construction of a misasagi of the deceased Emperor Tenji.
- July 22: Prince Ōama, being informed that the Ministers of the Court of Ōmikyō are plotting mischief against them, gives orders to Murakuni no Oyori (村国男依), Wanibe no Kimite (和珥部君手) and some other servants to hasten to Ō no Honji (多品治) in the province of Mino for the collection of weapons of all kinds for his war party.
- July 24: Prince Ōama, leaving Yoshino, is about to proceed to the east. He dispatches Ōkida no Kimi Yesaka (大分君 恵尺) and some of his ministers to Prince Takasaka, who is given charge in his absence, directing them to apply to him for posting bells. Accordingly, he lets Yesaka hasten to Ōmikyō and summon Prince Takechi and Prince Ōtsu to meet him in Ise.
- July 26: In the morning, Prince Ōama offers worship to the goddess Amaterasu Ōmikami on the banks of the River Tohogawa (迹太川), in the district of Asake (朝明). Prince Ōtsu comes to join him.
- July 27: Prince Ōama proceeds to Fuwa (不破) on the advice of Prince Takechi.
- July 31: Prince Ōama sends Ki no Omi Abemaro (紀臣阿閉麻呂), Ō no Honji and some of his ministers to cross over to Yamato by way of Mount Miyama (大山) in Ise. He sends Murakuni no Oyori and some servants, commanding tens of thousands of men, with the orders to set forth from Fuwa to proceed directly to Ōmikyō. Fearing that these troops might be difficult to distinguish from the army of Ōmikyō, he places a red mark on their clothing. The Court of Ōmikyō ordered Prince Yamabe (山部王) and Soga no Hatayasu to encamp on the banks of the River Inugami (犬上川) in order to attack Ōama's troops in Fuwa, but troubles occur among Ōmi's troops, and Prince Yamabe is killed, preventing the army's advancement. Soga no Hatayasu, who killed Prince Yamabe, returns from Inugami and stabs himself in the throat so that he dies. Hata no Kimi Yakuni (羽田公矢国), an Ōmi general, comes forward and surrenders. Prince Ōama appoints him general and lets him proceed north to Koshi. Ōmi sends select troops to make a sudden incursion into the village around Samegai (醒ヶ井; present-day Shiga prefecture), so Izumo no Koma (出雲狛) is sent to attack them and drive them off.
- August 1: Ōtomo no Fukei (大伴吹負) encamps on the top of Mount Narayama (乃楽山). Aredao no Atae Akamaro (荒田尾直赤麻呂) addresses Fukei concerning the urgency of ensuring that the old Asuka capital be well guarded. Fukei removes the planks of the bridges on the roads and makes of them breastworks, which he sets up on the highways in the surrounding neighborhoods of the capital, and so keeps watch.
- August 2: Fukei fights in battle with Soga no Hatayasu at Mount Narayama, but is defeated by Hatayasu and his men, and scatters. Hatayasu pursues him as far as Asuka, where he comes within sight of the capital, but seeing the breastworks set up on the highways, he suspects an ambush, and instead withdraws and retreats.
- August 3: Tanabe no Osumi (田辺小隅), a lieutenant-general of the Ōmi party, and his select troops attempt to enter Prince Ōama's encampment secretly in order to attack the prince.
- August 4: Ō no Honji intercepts Tanabe no Osumi's troops, and defeats them.
- August 5: Murakuni no Oyori and his men fight with the Ōmi troops at the River Yokogawa in Okinaga (息長) and defeat them, killing their General Sakaibe no Kusuri (境部薬).
- August 7: Oyori and his men attack the Ōmi general, Hada no Tomotari (秦友足), at Mount Tokoyama (鳥籠山), and slay him. Ki no Abemaro, hearing that Fukei, one of his comrades, was defeated by the Ōmi troops, divides their army and dispatches Okizome no Muraji Usagi (置始連菟) at the head of more than a thousand cavalry in haste to the Asuka capital.
- August 11: Oyori and his men fight a battle on the banks of the River Yasukawa, and suffer a great defeat.
- August 15: In Kurimoto, the Ōmi army is attacked and repelled by Oyori.
- August 20: Oyori and his men arrive at Seta. Prince Ōtomo and his ministers are encamped together west of the bridge. They engage in battle, with Ōtomo and his ministers escaping with their lives. Ōtomo no Fukei, being defeated at Mount Narayama, rallies his dispersed troops again, and engages in battle with Iki no Karakuni (壱伎韓国) at Chimata (衢) in Taima (当麻). A brave soldier named Kume (来目) rushes straight into the midst of Karakuni's army, and defeats it.
- August 21: Oyori slays the Ōmi Generals Inukai no Isokimi (犬養五十君) and Hasama no Atae Shiote (谷直塩手) at the marketplace of Awazu (粟津). Upon learning of this, Prince Ōtomo realizes he has nowhere to go, and so turns and conceals himself on the side of Mount Nagara, where he strangles himself to death.
- October 8: Prince Ōama makes a triumphal procession to Asuka.

== Sources ==
- "Jinshin no Ran." (1985). Kodansha Encyclopedia of Japan. Tokyo: Kodansha Ltd.
