= Emperor Tenmu =

Emperor of Japan from 673 to 686

Emperor Tenmu 天武天皇
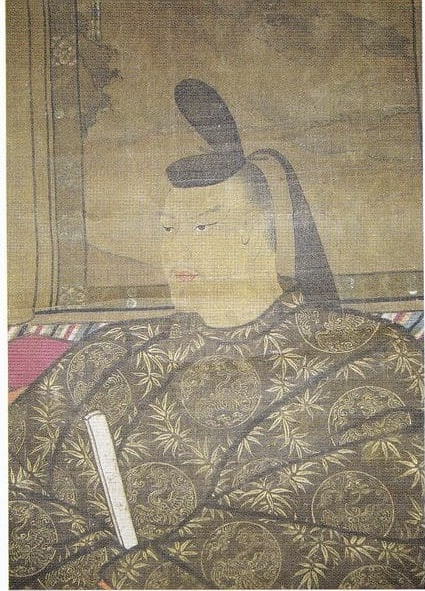

Emperor of Japan
- Reign: 673–686
- Predecessor: Tenji; Kōbun (disputed)
- Successor: Jitō
- Born: Ōama (大海人) c. 630; Asuka, Japan
- Died: 686 (aged around 56); Asuka, Japan
- Burial: Noguchi Ōbo Kofun, Asuka
- Spouse: Ten consorts, including Princess Uno no Sarara (later Empress Jitō)
- Issue: Princess Tōchi; Prince Takechi; Prince Kusakabe; Princess Ōku; Prince Ōtsu; Prince Naga; Prince Yuge; Prince Toneri; Princess Tajima; Prince Niitabe; Prince Hozumi; Princess Ki; Princess Tagata; Prince Osakabe; Princess Hatsusebe; Prince Shiki; Princess Taki; Prince Kawashima (adopted); Prince Shiki (adopted)
Posthumous name
- Chinese-style: Tenmu-tennō (天武天皇) Japanese-style: Ama-no-nunahara-oki-no-mahito-no-sumera-mikoto (天渟中原瀛真人天皇)
- House: Imperial House of Japan
- Father: Emperor Jomei
- Mother: Empress Kōgyoku

Emperor Tenmu (also romanized Temmu, c. 630 – 686) was the 40th emperor of Japan according to the traditional order of succession. The son of Emperor Jomei and Empress Kōgyoku, he was born Prince Ōama around 630. Ruling from 673 to 686, during the Asuka period, his life is mainly documented by the chronicles Nihon Shoki and Kojiki, as well as the poetry collection Man'yōshū.

Little is known of Ōama's early life. During the rule of his elder brother Tenji, Ōama was ambiguously favored as his successor, but was gradually bypassed in favor of Tenji's son Prince Ōtomo. Tenji allegedly offered Ōama the throne during an illness in 671, but fearing a conspiracy against him, Ōama declined and left to serve as a monk at Yoshino Palace. Tenji died soon after. The following year, Ōama received word that Ōtomo, now ruler, was planning to kill him. He fled Yoshino with a group of followers, beginning the Jinshin War. Along with a group of retainers and the governor of Ise Province, Ōama was able to block off the mountain passes to the northern and eastern provinces, where he raised an army against his nephew. Ōtomo was defeated and forced to commit suicide. Ōama took the throne and is posthumously known as Tenmu.

Tenmu made a number of political reforms, modeling his government after the centralized state of Tang China. He was likely the first Japanese ruler to use the title of tennō ('emperor') and the first to be described as a divine being (kami) in his lifetime. He redistributed political titles among his family and political supporters and created four new ranks at the top of the kabane noble title system. He selected a site for a new capital around 683, on which (after his death) was likely built Fujiwara-kyō. He was an enthusiastic supporter of both Buddhism and the goddess Amaterasu, making various reforms to Buddhist clerical governance and elevating Amaterasu's Ise Shrine to preeminence in Japan.

Tenmu's health began to decline in 685. In attempt to gain divine favor, the imperial court sponsored large-scale Buddhist rituals, but he died in 686. This began a mourning period and interregnum almost twice the usual length, during which both of his heirs died: Prince Ōtsu was executed later the same year, likely on the orders of Tenmu's consort Uno-no-sarara, while Prince Kusakabe died of ill health in 689. Uno-no-sarara ascended to the throne in 689 as Empress Jitō.

== Background and early life ==
Prince Ōama was the son of Emperor Jomei of Asuka Japan and his consort Princess Takara, and the younger brother of Naka no Ōe. His date of birth is unclear; traditional sources date his birth to either 613 or 621, but this would make him older than Naka, born in 626. Some modern historians have estimated a date around 630, owing to the existence of a middle sister, Princess Hashihito, between the two brothers. Due to the much older date in traditional sources, archaeologist Yuji Seki theorized that Ōama may have been the son of Takara and her first husband, Prince Takamuku.

Jomei had ascended to the throne in 629, around the time of Ōama's birth, following the death of the long-reigning Empress Suiko. Suiko had never selected an heir after the death of Prince Shōtoku in 622, leading to a protracted succession dispute between Jomei (the grandson of Suiko's husband and brother Emperor Bidatsu) and Shōtoku's son Yamashiro. Although Jomei took the throne with the support of Senior Minister Soga no Emishi, Yamashiro continued to press his claim.

Simplified family tree of the early Asuka period imperial house

Emperor Kinmei r. 531–571
Emperor Yōmei r. 585–587
Emperor Sushun r. 587–593
Empress Suiko r. 593–628	Emperor Bidatsu r. 572–585
Prince Shōtoku	Prince Takeda	Prince Oshisakao no Hikohito
Prince Chinu
Prince Yamashiro	Emperor Jomei (Prince Tamura) r. 629–641	Empress Kōgyoku/Saimei (Princess Takara) r. 642–645, 655–661	Emperor Kōtoku (Prince Karu) r. 645–654)
Emperor Tenji (Prince Naka no Ōe) r. 668–671	Emperor Tenmu (Prince Ōama) r. 673–686

Upon Jomei's death in 641, Yamashiro stood as the strongest potential candidate for emperor, as Jomei's heir Naka no Ōe was only sixteen years old. However, Emishi continued to oppose Yamashiro, and proposed Jomei's son Furuhito no Ōe (whose mother was a member of the Soga clan) take the throne. Lacking significant backing, Emishi agreed to a compromise following the precedent of Empress Suiko's ascension, and Princess Takara took the throne as Empress Kōgyoku. Emishi's son Soga no Iruka became the dominant political figure during Kōgyoku's reign, seizing control of administrative affairs and purging many of his opponents, including Yamashiro and his family. A triumvirate of three statesmen—Nakatomi no Kamatari, Soga no Ishikawa Maro, and Prince Naka no Ōe—assassinated Iruka in 645. Kōgyoku abdicated, initially intending for Naka to take the throne; however, with pressure from Nakatomi, her brother Prince Karu took the throne as Emperor Kōtoku.

Kotoku was succeeded by the former Empress Kōgyoku in 655, who reigned again under the new name Saimei. In 660, the Korean kingdom of Baekje (an ally of Japan) fell to a combined Tang–Silla force. The following year, Saimei, alongside Naka and Ōama, sailed to Kyushu to oversee the construction of an armada to invade Korea and restore Baekje. Saimei died in Kyushu in the 9th month of that year, and Prince Naka was appointed as an interim regent, unwilling to officially take the throne; two years later, the Japanese armada was defeated. Naka oversaw the expansion of fortifications around Kyushu, seeking to defend against a possible Sino-Korean invasion, and integrated provincial elites into the court rank system. These efforts increased imperial authority, but created considerable unrest among the Japanese clans.

Ōama's first wife was Princess Nukata, the daughter of an obscure noble named Prince Kagami. Ōama also married four of Naka's daughters, likely as an effort to lessen the influence of prominent families such as the Soga over future successors. Among these was Uno-no-sarara, who became his chief consort. He married five other wives, including Kamatari's daughter Ioe. According to legend, Nukata was forced to leave Ōama in order to marry Prince Naka around 660.

== Rise to power ==
Naka appears to have ambiguously supported Prince Ōama as his successor; the 8th century chronicle Nihon Shoki inconsistently labels him as heir. Naka moved the capital to the Ōtsu Palace in Ōmi Province in 667 and was formally enthroned as Emperor Tenji the next year. Following this, he distanced himself from his brother to support his own favorite son, Prince Ōtomo, as his successor. The Tōshi Kaden, an 8th century history of the Fujiwara clan, relays an anecdote from Tenji's coronation banquet in 668, stating that Ōama startled Tenji by throwing a spear into the floorboards in front of him. Tenji is said to have drawn his sword and prepared to kill his brother, but the Fujiwara ancestor Nakatomi no Kamatari calmed his temper and saved Ōama.

Ōtomo was granted the title of Daijō-daijin (prime minister) in early 671. The following day, either Ōama or Ōtomo was tasked with performing court duties; the chronicles are unclear and contradictory on who was entrusted with this role. In the eighth month of that year, Tenji became seriously ill and summoned Ōama, offering him the position as his successor. Either unwilling to become emperor or fearing that his acceptance would be used as pretext to have him removed from succession, Ōama refused, instead proposing that Tenji's consort Yamatohime serve as empress, with Ōtomo as her regent. Ōama shaved his hair and asked permission from Tenji to become a Buddhist monk; Tenji accepted two days later, and Ōama traveled to Yoshino Palace in southern Yamato Province with a small group followers. It is unknown if Tenji genuinely sought to offer the throne to his brother, or if the offer was made as part of a plot against him.

=== Jinshin War ===
Tenji died in the 12th month of 671. Although Ōtomo was recognized as his successor by the imperial court in Ōmi, later chronicles such as the Nihon Shoki do not recognize him as an emperor, and it is unclear if he was ever enthroned; he may have simply controlled affairs as the designated heir, possibly with Yamatohime as an uncrowned empress regnant. The imperial court suspected a conspiracy on Ōama's part, and cut him off from receiving supplies from the capital. In the sixth month of 672, Ōama received a report from his political allies in Mino Province that Ōtomo was plotting to attack him, and fled east on horseback, beginning a succession dispute known as the Jinshin War. Alongside a small group of retainers and soldiers from Yamato Province, he was accompanied by Uno-no-sarara and their eleven-year-old son Kusakabe.

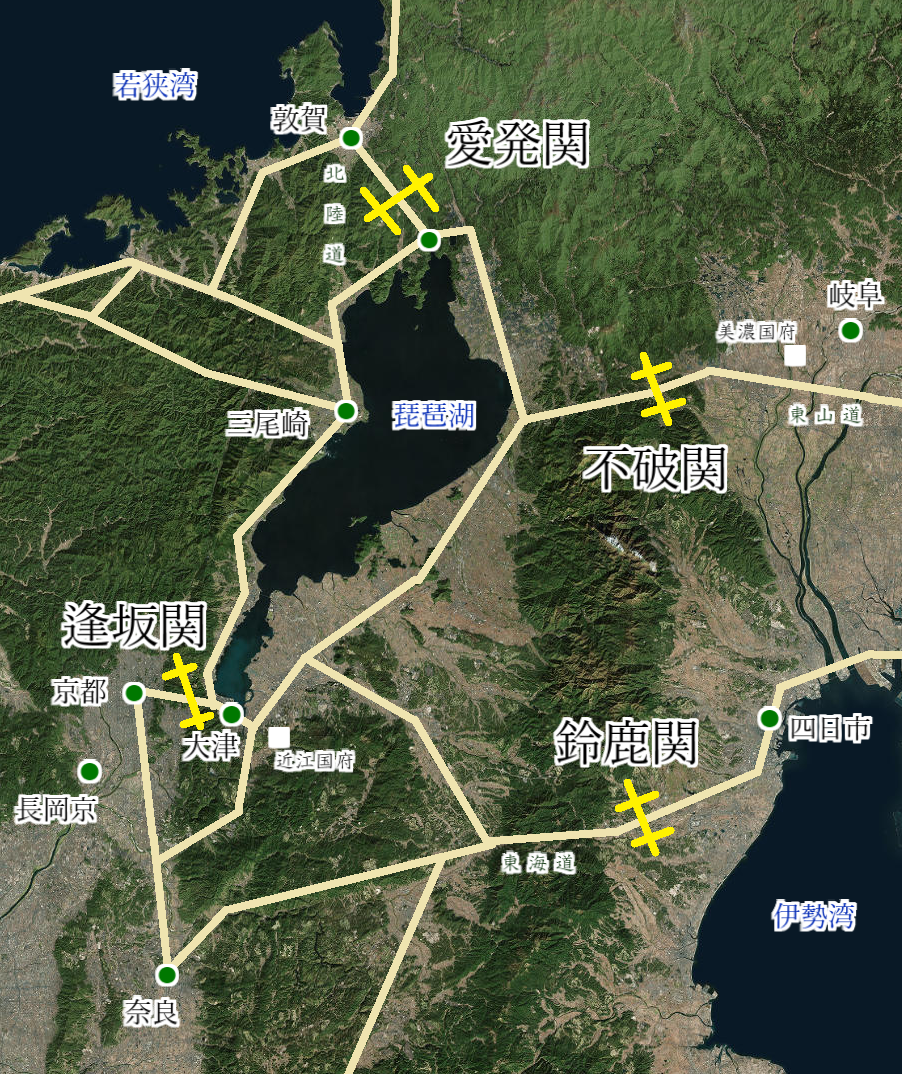
Japanese map of locations in ancient eastern Kansai. The Suzuka Barrier is marked at the bottom-right, with Fuwa Pass above it. Ōmi is marked at the southern end of Lake Biwa.

Ōama was limited by the small group of soldiers which came to support him. However, he was able to receive the support of the governor of Ise Province, who sent a force of five hundred soldiers to close the Suzuka Barrier, one of two mountain passes allowing access to the eastern provinces from the Kansai region. Following this, he was additionally able to gain support from officials in Owari and Mino, and possibly from the governors of Shinano and Kai. However, most governors were appointed directly by the Ōmi court, and continued to recognize its rule. Various local chieftains from across the eastern and northern provinces formed an important wellspring of support: he was able to mobilize a large number of supporters in eastern Japan, especially including the chieftains of the Hokuriku region, which had generally been affiliated with those in Owari and Mino. In Yamato, the powerful Ōtomo clan (unrelated to Prince Ōtomo) sided with Ōama, likely due to their opposition to the dominant Soga clan and the court's move to Ōmi. A strong hatred of Ōtomo's Baekjean generals may have also pushed the Ōtomo and the immigrant Yamato no Aya clan to support Ōama.

While Ōama was able to gain a significant amount of support in the north and east, the Ōmi court struggled to secure gaining reinforcements from the western and southern provinces. Despite this, pro-Ōmi forces were able to push back a contingent of Ōama's troops in Yamato Province early in the seventh month of 672. After this, Ōama split his main force into three armies: the largest marched through Fuwa Pass and along the southern shore of Lake Biwa, another went along the north of the lake, and the last retreated back through Mino and Ise to reinforce the troops in Yamato. Although shaken by a night cavalry raid, Ōama's largest army routed Ōtomo's forces at Seta, just to the southeast of Ōmi. Prince Ōtomo was said to have committed suicide by the end of the seventh month, although some historians have theorized that he was betrayed by his minister Mononobe no Maro (later known as Isonokami), who continued to serve under Ōama and his successors. Ōama executed or banished his top officials (inherited from Tenji's government), but pardoned many of the other ministers of the Ōmi court. Ōama was enthroned at Asuka in 673. He is often referred to during his reign by his posthumous name, Emperor Tenmu (天武; literally 'divine warrior').

== Reign ==
Tenmu was the 40th emperor in the traditional order of succession. He was likely the first ruler of Japan to use the title of Emperor (tennō, literally "heavenly sovereign") in his lifetime, with its use attested by a mokkan (wooden tablet) dating to his reign. The exact origins of the title is unknown; Tenmu, known to have an interest in Daoism, may have adopted it imitation of the Daoist deity Tianhuang Emperor (tennō taitei), a name also used for the North Star. Alternatively, it may have been borrowed from China, as Emperor Gaozong of Tang briefly adopted the Chinese equivalent (tiānhuáng) in 674. Before this, Japanese rulers generally used the title of King (Ō) or potentially Great King (Daiō), alongside various other ceremonial titles attested in the Nihon Shoki.

Shortly after he took office, a set of Korean dignitaries from the states of Goguryeo, Silla, and Tamna came to Kyushu to send their condolences for Tenji's death; they were rejected and asked to return home, told that Tenmu was only accepting envoys which came to offer congratulations to him. During his rise to power, the geopolitical situation in Korea began to shift: following a conflict with the Tang, Silla was able to gain hegemony over the Korean peninsula, pushing Chinese forces north and capturing the former territory of Baekje. Tenmu continued to reinforce northern Kyushu against a potential invasion and maintained the fortification system began by his brother. He began a practice of ferrying border guards from eastern Honshu to reinforce posts in Kyushu. Tenmu took a different foreign policy than his brother, cutting off formal relationships with the Tang in favor of the ascendant Silla.

=== Administrative reforms ===
Under Tenmu's reign, the Japanese state began to adopt elements of Chinese statecraft, seeking to create a more centralized state, while likely also taking inspiration from the structure of the rising Silla, which featured a powerful ritualistic emperor heading a powerful ministerial government. As Tenmu had most of the top officials under Tenji executed in the aftermath of the Jinshin War, he was able to redistribute the top political postings among his supporters. He opened up and expanded the ranks of his court, recruiting courtiers from among the realm's elites and chieftains. Unlike the reigns of many other emperors, no preeminent ministers came to power under Tenmu, as he leaned heavily on his immediate family for support.

Due to his reforms, Tenmu's reign is often seen as the beginning of the Japanese imperial system (Tennō-sei). He left vacant the positions of Minister of the Left (Sadaijin) and Minister of the Right (Udaijin)—previously the most powerful political appointments—while appointing a member of the imperial clan to the new post of Counselor (nagon), who served as his private secretary. Various other members of his immediate family received appointments: his consort Uno-no-sarara served as one of his main advisors, while two of his sons were given important posts during the early 680s. He largely preserved the old system of noble titles (kabane), but created four new ranks at the top of the hierarchy: Mahito for members of the imperial clan, Asomi for clan chiefs related to the imperial family, and Sukune and Imiki for chiefs of other clans loyal to imperial rule.

Between 680 and 684, Tenmu granted noble titles to 177 families. Tenmu's government inherited some aspects of his predecessors; he preserved a government structure of six ministries subordinate to a Council of State (Daijō-kan) and a Secretariat (Benkan). The Justice Ministry (Gyōkan) in particular saw expansion under Tenmu's reign, who proclaimed that both officials and nonofficials would be judged and punished for crimes.

=== Construction ===
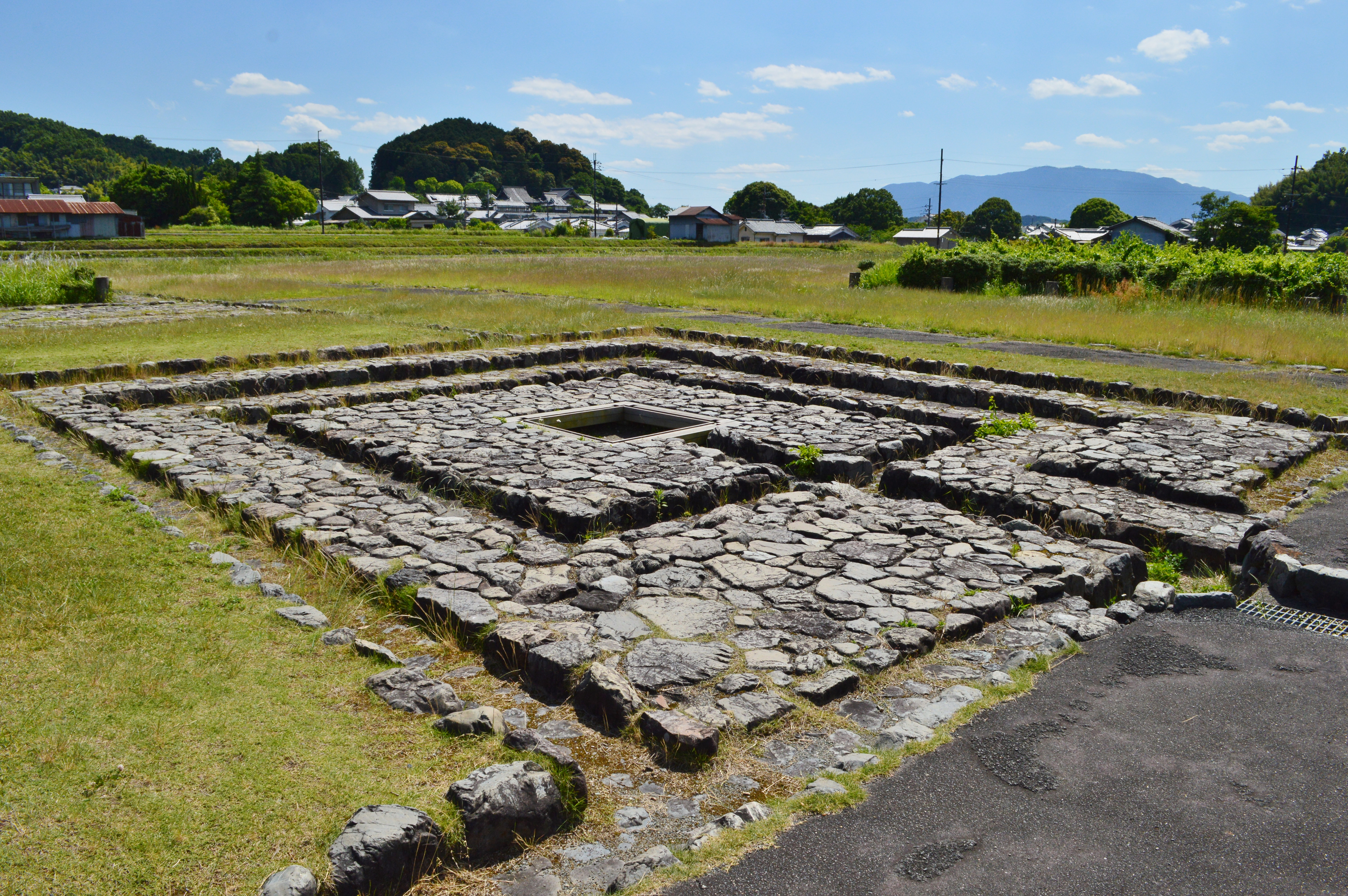
The ruins of Tenmu's Kiyomihara palace in Asuka

Upon taking the throne, Tenmu returned the imperial court from Ōmi to the old capital of Asuka. He ordered the construction of the new imperial palace of Kiyomihara at the site of three previous palaces in the prior decades, the first built by his father Jomei around 630. Although grand in scale—the Nihon Shoki describes it as featuring a variety of offices, halls, and a Daigoku-den (Hall of State) in addition to the imperial residence and courtyard—it was constructed very quickly, and likely incorporated parts of the previous palaces at the site. This may have only been intended as a temporary capital, as by 676 Tenmu began searching for a site to build a new, larger capital city (tentatively referred to as Shinjō, 'the new walled [city]") based on Chinese-style urban planning. However, he did not seem to have found a suitable site for some time after he became emperor.

Around 682 or 683, Tenmu seems to have settled on a location for his new capital; this was likely Fujiwara-kyō, a site near Asuka which would become Japan's first Chinese-style planned city. In addition to the new capital, he advocated for the coastal center of Naniwa-kyō to become a walled secondary capital, likely in imitation of the Tang dynasty's capitals at Chang'an and Luoyang.

=== Religious policy ===
One poem, allegedly written by Ōtomo no Miyuki in 672 following Tenmu's victory in the Jinshin War, celebrates him and the palace of Kiyomihara, and is possibly the first Japanese poem to describe a ruler as a kami (divine being); Tenmu himself is thought to have begun the practice of beginning imperial edicts with the proclamation "Hear ye the edict of an emperor of Japan who is a manifest kami". He reformed the system of kami worship, prioritizing the imperial clan in various religious matters: Amaterasu, the ancestral goddess of the imperial clan, was prioritized above other ancestral kami, while the tennō himself was placed at the top of both the hierarchy of religious leaders and the system of rites and offerings including Daijosai. The Ise Shrine to Amaterasu was made the preeminent shrine in Japan, with Tenmu reviving the practice of appointing an imperial princess to reside at the temple in order to worship Amaterasu on his behalf.

Tenmu sponsored and regularized official Buddhist rites, performed at the three temples he granted official status, all located in the vicinity of Kiyomihara: Gufuku-ji, Gangō-ji, and (the most prestigious) Daikandai-ji. The Soga-backed Asuka-dera, while not formally an official temple, was treated as such in accordance with Tenmu's edicts. Buddhist institutions became increasingly dependent on state backing during his reign; he reorganized the Prelates' Office (Sōgō), staffing it with clerics housed at Daikandai-ji. He moved one of the top Buddhist officials formerly under the Prelates' Office, the Chief of the Law (Hōtō), into the secular Agency of Buddhist and Alien Affairs (Genbaryō), which managed immigration in addition to Buddhist matters. In 673, Tenmu oversaw the completion of the Takechi no Ōdera temple, and commissioned construction of the grand Yakushi-ji temple in 680. He also sponsored the copying of the entire Buddhist canon in a project completed in 677.

== Death and legacy ==
Tenmu's health began to decline in the ninth month of 685. Various Buddhist rituals and prayers were performed in an attempt to aid him, and an infusion of the herb okera was prepared to restore his health. His health continued to decline over the following year. In the sixth month of 686, his advisors advised that the Kusanagi no Tsurugi sword—one of the three Imperial Regalia of Japan—had been cursed and was contributed to his ill health; it was taken to its home Atsuta Shrine for safekeeping. The Nihon Shoki reports a rapid succession of rituals conducted over the seventh and eighth months: Buddhist functionaries were called to the palace to perform penitential rituals and read sutras, while the Ōharae ('Great Purification') was ordered to be conducted in every province. Early in the seventh month, half of all taxes were remitted, forced labor was suspended, and the era name was changed to Shuchō, an action often made during dire situations for the desire of a new beginning.

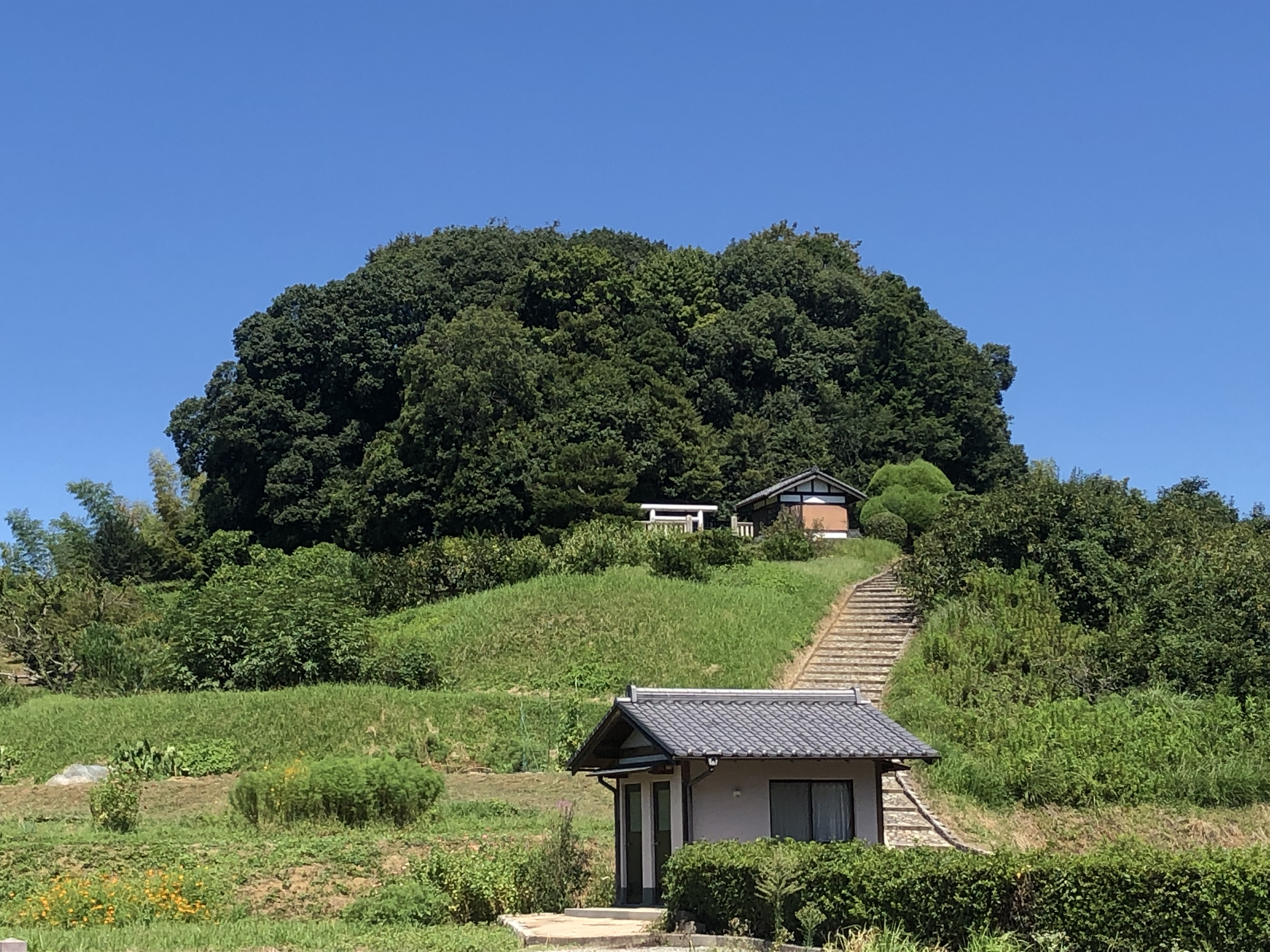
Noguchi Ōbo Kofun, the tomb (kofun) of Tenmu and Jitō in Asuka, Nara.

Around the end of the seventh month and the beginning of the eighth, hundreds of people were called up to become monks and nuns in Tenmu's honor, and a hundred statues of Guanyin were placed around the palace. Various fiefs were distributed to imperial princes and preeminent temples; the exact distribution was used to indicate how Tenmu judged the relative rank of each prince, as well as to show support to the noble benefactors of the temples. On the ninth day of the ninth month, Tenmu died and a temporary burial palace (the Mogari-no-miya) was erected at the capital. Officials from various departments and offices pronounced eulogies in his honor, and the monthly anniversary of his death was declared a day of mourning. Prince Kusakabe led funeral processions in his honor over the following months. A poem in Tenmu's honor is attributed to the widowed empress, Uno-no-sarara, lamenting how she can not let go of her grief over his death.

After his death, construction at Naniwa-kyō was halted; the site burned down the same year, and it was not rebuilt for another forty years. Tenmu was permanently reinterred on the 11th day of the 11th month in 688, over two years after his death, ending a lengthy period of Mogari-no-miya and allowing for the instatement of a formal successor. Tenmu was given a long posthumous name, Ama-no-nunahara-oki-no-mahito-no-sumera-mikoto, 'Emperor, the Perfected Man of the Offing in the Central Marsh of Heaven", incorporating a variety of Daoist terms. Tenmu's tomb is believed to be the Noguchi Ōbo Kofun at the site of Fujiwara-kyō in what is now the city of Kashihara. Empress Jitō (formerly Uno-no-sarara) was also later interred at this tomb.

=== Succession ===
In 679, Tenmu traveled to Yoshino and had six of his sons—Kusakabe, Ōtsu, Takechi, Kawashima, Osakabe, and Shiki (Note: Shiki and Kawashima were sons of Tenji that were adopted by Tenmu.)—swear an oath to not begin a succession dispute after his death, proclaiming that although born of separate mothers, all would be treated as if they were the sons of his chief consort Uno-no-sarara. Tenmu's other sons were too young to make the pledge, but they were still bound to its legal effects. In an edict promulgated in 681, Tenmu ordered the compilation of a new law code (the Asuka Kiyomihara Code) and proclaimed Kusakabe a senior prince, serving with full royal prerogative; this seems to indicate that he favored Kusakabe, Uno-no-sarara's son, to succeed him as emperor. However, in 683, he also granted elevated status to Prince Ōtsu, who (like Kusakabe) was his son with one of Tenji's daughters. It is unknown why Tenmu created an apparent rival to Kusakabe's position in the succession. From 683 until Tenmu's death, the state was managed by the co-rulership of Kusakabe, Ōtsu, Tenmu, and Uno-no-sarara.

Following Tenmu's death, Ōtsu was left politically isolated due to the prior death of his mother Princess Ōta and the preeminent power of his aunt Uno-no-sarara. Likely under her orders, Ōtsu was charged with treason and executed in 686. Kusakabe's succession was delayed by the extremely long mourning period of twenty-seven months (almost double the average of around fifteen months). Both a lack of political consensus over Kusakabe and a desire to elevate the status of the deceased emperor likely contributed to this lengthy interregnum. Kusakabe died in 689, long in poor health, leaving the succession uncertain. Following the precedent of Suiko and Kōgyoku and seeking to maintain Tenmu's branch of the inperial dynasty (a merger of Tenmu's and Tenji's lines), Uno-no-sarara ascended to the throne in 690, ruling as Empress Jitō. Jitō reigned until 697, when she retired to become the first Daijō-tennō ('empress emeritus') in favor of Kusakabe's son, the young Prince Karu, who took the throne as Emperor Monmu.

Tenmu's descendants would continue to rule as emperor throughout most of the late Asuka and Nara period. His stem line ruled until the death of Empress Shōtoku in 770, who was succeeded in favor of one of Tenji's descendants, Prince Shirakabe, who took the throne as Emperor Kōnin.

== Sources and historiography ==
The Nihon Shoki, published in 720, gives little coverage of the reign of Jomei, and as a result scant information is available on Tenmu's early life. The book gives Tenmu two chapters: the first covers the Jinshin War and his rise to power, while the second covers his reign itself. Despite the succession conflict, the Nihon Shoki treats Tenmu's reign as having begun immediately after Tenji's death, although Tenmu was not able to return to the capital to rule for ten months after this point. Tenmu is portrayed as trying to assert his rightful rule against those loyal to Prince Ōtomo. Ōtomo was recognized as a former emperor by some early modern historians such as Ban Nobutomo, but only in 1870 was he officially recognized as Tenmu's predecessor.

The Jinshin War and Tenmu's rise to power is described in a short preface to the 8th century chronicle Kojiki ('records of ancient matters'). The section within the Kojiki strongly supports Tenmu, describing him as a 'submerged dragon' (Note: A 'submerged dragon' likely refers to a virtuous emperor who was initially unwilling.) and 'molting cicada' (Note: The description of 'molting cicada' may refer to how Tenmu withdrew from the secular world to become a monk, but may also refer to the mystical concept of corpse liberation, implying that he shed his body to become a transcendent being.) who was called upon by heaven to take the throne and purify the land of the 'evil rebels'. The section also claims that he surpassed the Yellow Emperor and King of Zhou in his virtue and mastery of the Way.

The Kojiki preface claims that Tenmu had a deep interest in history, and was upset by the disordered state of the Teiki ('imperial chronicles') and Kyūji ('ancient accounts'). He is said to have ordered the court attendant Hieda no Are to compile these into a single definitive record; these were then transcribed by the scribe Ō no Yasumaro during Empress Genmei's reign and presented to the throne as the Kojiki in 712. The Nihon Shoki also claims to be created on the order of Emperor Tenmu, but attributes its compilation to a council of twelve princes and noblemen rather than any individual; although some scholars (such as the 19th-century theologian Hirata Atsutane) have claimed that both texts stem from the same origin, others have theorized that they stem from two different orders by Tenmu, or that work on the Nihon Shoki only began after the Kojiki was finished. The texts may have attributed their creation to Tenmu in order to legitimize their historical content.

=== Poetry ===
Three poems in the Man'yōshū, the oldest collection of Japanese poetry, are credited to Tenmu. These comprise one chōka and three tanka; the most famous is a reply to a poem by his former wife Princess Nukata, in which he expresses her longing for her after she was taken by his brother Tenji. The other poems attributed to Tenmu celebrate and praise Yoshino. These are juxtaposed in the same volume by other praise poems for Yoshino by Kakinomoto no Hitomaro, alongside poems about the ruined Ōmi capital by Hitomaro and Takechi no Kurohito. The historian Torquil Duthie theorized that the Yoshino Palace became a symbol of Tenmu's divine authority under the reigns of Jitō and her successors; Jitō made a large number of visits to the site, a practice resurrected by Tenmu's great-grandson Emperor Shōmu in the 8th century. Tenmu also serves as the subject of a number of other poems through the Man'yōshū. Poems mourning him are attributed to Jitō, Prince Kusakabe, and Prince Takechi.

== Family ==
Tenmu had ten consorts, four of whom were daughters of his brother Tenji. He had ten sons and seven daughters. Additionally, he adopted two of Tenji's sons as his own, Prince Kawashima and Prince Shiki. His consorts were:

- Princess Uno no Sarara, the daughter of Tenji and his consort Ochi no Iratsume (the daughter of Tenji's political ally Soga no Ishikawa Maro). Tenmu's chief consort, she married him when she was twelve years old, and became the mother of his favorite son Prince Kusakabe. She took the throne as Empress Jitō after Tenmu's death.
- Princess Ōta, the older sister of Princess Uno no Sarara. The mother of Prince Ōtsu and Princess Ōku, she died in 667, before Tenmu took the throne.
- Princess Ōe, a daughter of Tenji and mother of Prince Naga and Prince Yuge.
- Princess Niitabe, a daughter of Tenji and mother of Prince Toneri.
- Princess Nukata, the daughter of the obscure Prince Kagami. The first woman Tenmu married, she was the mother of Princess Tōchi. Evidenced by some of her poems in the Man’yōshū, she was forced to leave Tenmu and marry Tenji.
- Higami no Iratsume, the daughter of Fujiwara no Kamatari and mother of Princess Tajima.
- Ōnu no Iratsume, the daughter of Soga no Akae and mother of Prince Hozumi, Princess Ki, and Princess Tagata.
- Ioe no Iratsume, the younger sister of Higami and mother of Prince Niitabe.
- Amako no Iratsume, the daughter of Munakata no Tokuzen and mother of Tenmu's eldest son Prince Takechi.
- Kajihime no Iratsume, the daughter of Shishihito no Omi Ōmaro and mother of Prince Osakabe, Princess Hatsusebe, Prince Shiki (not to be confused with Tenji's son Shiki), and Princess Taki.

== Notes ==
=== Bibliography ===
- Brown, Delmer M., ed. (1993). The Cambridge History of Japan. Vol. 1. Cambridge University Press. doi:10.1017/CHOL9780521223522. ISBN 9781139055062.
  - Mitsusada, Inoue. "The Century of Reform". 163–220.
  - Kōjirō, Naoki; Bock, Felicia G. "The Nara State". 221–267.
- Duthie, Torquil (2013). "The Jinshin Rebellion and the Politics of Historical Narrative in Early Japan". Journal of the American Oriental Society. 133 (2): 295–320. doi:10.7817/jameroriesoci.133.2.0295. JSTOR 10.7817/jameroriesoci.133.2.0295.
- Duthie, Torquil (2014). Man'yōshū and the Imperial Imagination in Early Japan. Brill. doi:10.1163/9789004264540. ISBN 9789004251717.
- Ebersole, Gary L. (1989). Ritual Poetry and the Politics of Death in Early Japan. Princeton University Press. doi:10.2307/j.ctv14163gw. ISBN 9780691019291. JSTOR j.ctv14163gw.
- Farris, William W. (1995). Heavenly Warriors: The Evolution of Japan's Military, 500–1300. Vol. 157. Harvard University Asia Center. doi:10.2307/j.ctt1tfjbcf. ISBN 9780674387034. JSTOR j.ctt1tfjbcf.
- Farris, William W. (1998). Sacred Texts and Buried Treasures: Issues in the Historical Archaeology of Ancient Japan. University of Hawai'i Press. ISBN 9780824864224. JSTOR j.ctt6wqxt7.
- Hisamatsu, Sen'ichi (1976). Biographical Dictionary of Japanese Literature. Kodansha. ISBN 9780870112539.
- Hurst, G. Cameron (1978). "An Emperor Who Ruled as Well as Reigned: Tenmu Tennō". In Murakami, Hyōe; Harper, Thomas J. (eds.). Great Historical Figures of Japan. Japan Cultural Institute. pp. 16–27. ISBN 9780870404313.
- Seki, Yuji (2022). 女系で読み解く天皇の古代史 [Understanding the Ancient History of the Emperor through the Female Line]. PHP Institute. ISBN 9784569851921.
- Iwanaga, Shozo (2025). 文武大嘗宮論のための予備的検討 [Preparatory Study on Emperor Monmu's Daijo-kyu] (PDF). Bulletin of the Kyushu University Museum (in Japanese). 22 (22): 81–115. doi:10.15017/7343986.
- Ooms, Herman (2009). Imperial Politics and Symbolics in Ancient Japan: The Tenmu Dynasty, 650–800. University of Hawai'i Press. ISBN 9780824832353. JSTOR j.ctt6wr02x.
- Piggott, Joan (1997). The Emergence of Japanese Kingship. Stanford University Press. ISBN 9780804728324.
- Sakamoto, Tarō (1991). The Six National Histories of Japan. Translated by Brownlee, John S. University of British Columbia Press. ISBN 9784130270267.

=== Primary sources ===
- Aston, William George, ed. (1896). Nihongi: Chronicles of Japan from the Earliest Times to A.D. 697. Vol. 2. The Japan Society. OCLC 84460259.

Regnal titles
Preceded by Emperor Kōbun	Emperor of Japan: Temmu; 672–686	Succeeded by Empress Jitō
