= Suō Provincial Capital =

Coordinates: 34°3′27.5″N 131°35′10.9″E

Suō Provincial Capital Site
- 周防国衙跡 (Japanese)
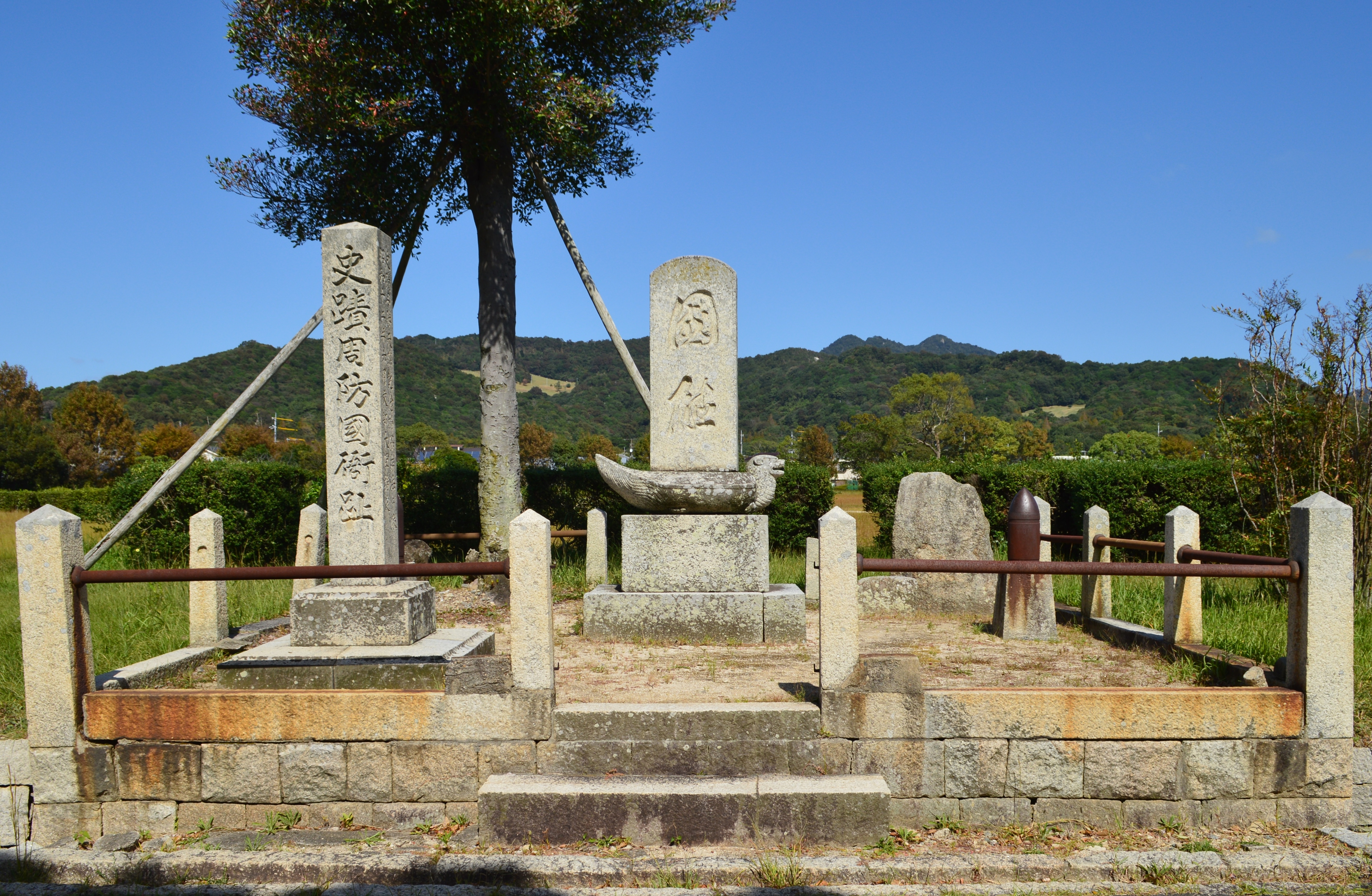
- Suō Provincial Capital Site

- Suō Provincial Capital Site Suō Provincial Capital (Japan)
- Type: Settlement
- Location: Hōfu, Yamaguchi, Japan
- Region: San'yō region

History
- Built: Nara - Heian period

Site notes
- Condition: ruins
- Public access: Yes (no public facilities)

The Suō Provincial Capital site (周防国衙跡, Suō Kokuga ato) is an archaeological site consisting of the ruins of the Nara period to early Heian period Provincial Capital of Suō Province, located in the Kokuga, Keigo and Katsuma neighborhoods of the city of Hōfu, Yamaguchi in the San'yō region of Japan. The site was designated a National Historic Site of Japan in 1937.

== Overview ==
Following the Taika Reform (645 AD) which aimed at a centralization of the administration following the Chinese model (ritsuryō), provincial capitals were established in the various provinces, headed by an official titled kokushi, who replaced the older Kuni no miyatsuko. With a square layout, the provincial capitals were patterned after the Capital of Japan, first Fujiwara-kyō and then Heijō-kyō, which in turn were modelled on the Tang capital Chang'an, but on a much, much smaller scale. Each had office buildings for administration, finance, police and military and the official building of the governor, as well as granaries for tax rice and other taxable produce. In the periphery there was the provincial temple (kokubun-ji), and nunnery (kokubun-niji) and the garrison. This system collapsed with the growth of feudalism in the Late Heian period, and the location of many of the provincial capitals is now lost.

The Suō Provincial Capital was located on an alluvial terrace to the south of Mount Tatara in the eastern part of the modern city of Hōfu. Per an archaeological excavation conducted from 1961 to 1964, its area was estimated to be 850 meters square, and the north–south boundaries and northwest and southwest corners were demarcated by a moat and earthen ramparts. The main administrative complex was an inner enclosure about 220 meters square, with its own moat and three-meter wide earthen rampart, bisected by a north–south road. The structures within the enclosure are uncertain due to later disturbances, but it is assumed that the government office complexes wee on the west side of the main axis, and that the kitchen, workshop, and miscellaneous quarters were located on the east side. Excavations have unearthed earthenware from the Nara period, as well as ritual objects, such as stones with human faces drawn in ink. In the Nara period, the coastline of the Seto Inland Sea stretched to the south of the Kokufu area, and there was a port in the area called Funadokoro and Hamanomiya, which is located in the southeastern part of the government complex. In the surrounding area were the foundations of warehouses thought to be from the late Heian period, and shards of Chinese ceramics, domestic roof tiles, and Haji ware have been found.

During the late Heian period to the beginning of the Kamakura period, most of the provincial capitals fell into ruin and disappeared due to the lack of power and influence of the central government; however, as the revenue of Suō Province was designated for use in the rebuilding of the great temple of Tōdai-ji in Nara, the kokufu complex was transformed into the temple of Kokuchō-ji until the start of the Meiji period. The area is now a historic park.

== See also ==
- List of Historic Sites of Japan (Yamaguchi)
