= Sakyo =

looSakyō (左京, "the left side of the capital") refers to the area east of Suzaku Avenue, the central avenue in the ancient capitals of Japan, especially Kyoto.

It may also refer to:

- Sakyo-ku, Kyoto
- Sakyoshiki, the administrator of Sakyo. It was an old government post established by the Ritsuryo system.
  - Names derived from Sakyoshiki
    - Sakyo Komatsu, a Japanese science fiction writer
    - Sakyo, a YuYu Hakusho character
    - Sakyo, a support character from Megane, Tokidoki, Yankī-kun
    - Sakyo Kuroyami, a character from Beyblade: Shogun Steel

== See also ==
- Ukyo (disambiguation)
