= Ukyo =

Ukyō (右京, "the right side of the capital") refers to the area west of Suzaku Avenue, the central avenue in the ancient capitals of Japan, especially Kyoto.

It may also refer to:

- Ukyo-ku, Kyoto
- Ukyoshiki, the administrator of Ukyo. It was an old government post established by the Ritsuryo system.
  - Names derived from Ukyoshiki
    - Ukyo Katayama, a Japanese racing driver
    - Ukyō Kodachi (小太刀右京), Japanese writer
    - Ukyo Kuonji, a Ranma ½ character
    - Ukyo Shuto (周東 佑京, born 1996), Japanese professional baseball player
    - Ukyo Tachibana, a Samurai Shodown character

== See also ==
- Sakyo (disambiguation)
