= Mokkan =

Wooden tablets found at Japanese archaeological sites

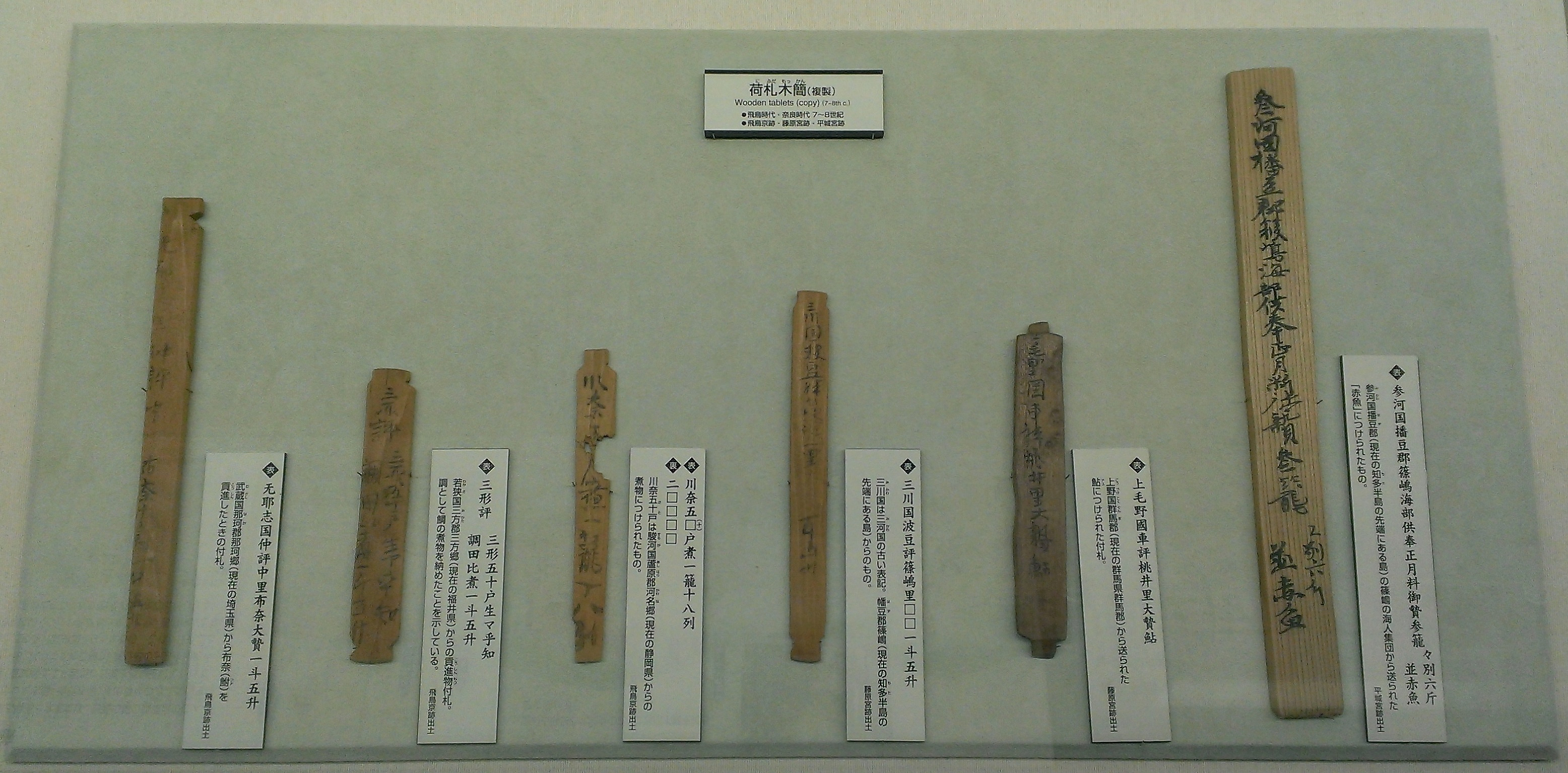
Replicas of mokkan

Mokkan (Japanese: 木簡) are wooden tablets found at Japanese archaeological sites. Most of the tablets date from the mid-7th to mid-8th century, but some are as late as the early modern period. They have been found in sites across Japan, but mostly around the old capitals of Nara and Fujiwara. They were used for informal purposes, such as shipping tags, memoranda, and simple messages, and thus complement official records transmitted on paper.

== Finds ==
The first mokkan was found in Mie Prefecture in 1928, but extensive caches have been found during construction work since the 1960s, especially in the 1980s and 1990s. In August 1988, some 50,000 tablets from the early 8th century were found during the excavation for a department store in Nara. The site turned out to be the residence of Prince Nagaya, a minister of the Nara court, and the tablets have improved historians' understanding of the period. Over 150,000 have been recovered.

== Language ==
Some mokkan are written in Classical Chinese, but many are written in Old Japanese, demonstrating that literacy was more widespread than previously thought in the second half of the 7th century. The texts are typically short and more informal than the poetry and liturgies that make up the main corpus of Old Japanese.

== See also ==
- Bamboo and wooden slips
