= Heijō-kyō =

Historical capital of Japan

Coordinates: 34°41′28″N 135°47′41″E

Heijo-kyō
- 平城京 (Japanese)
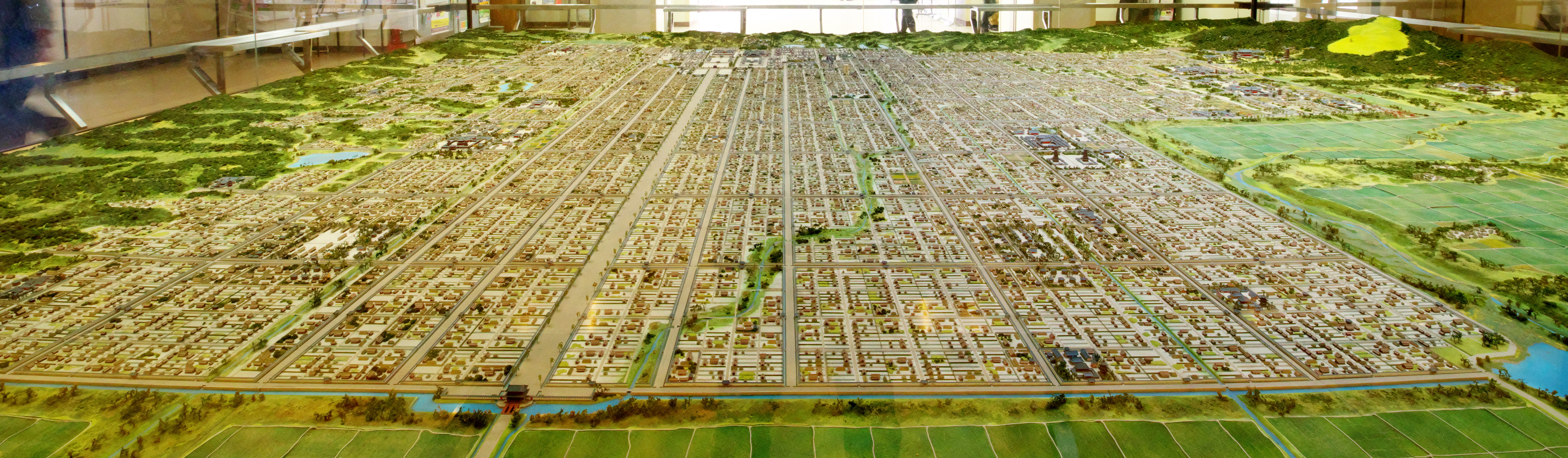
- 1/1000 scale model of Heijō-kyō

- Heijo-kyō Heijō-kyō (Japan)
- Interactive map of Heijo-kyō
- Type: settlement trace
- Periods: Nara period
- Location: Nara, Nara Prefecture, Japan
- Region: Kansai region

History
- Built: c.8th century

Site notes
- Public access: Yes (park)

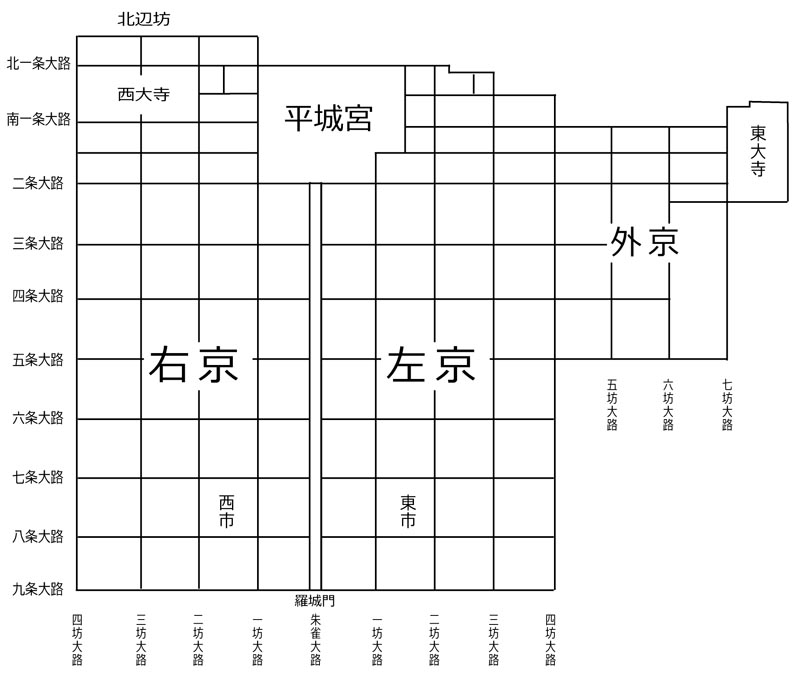
Street plan of Heijō-kyō

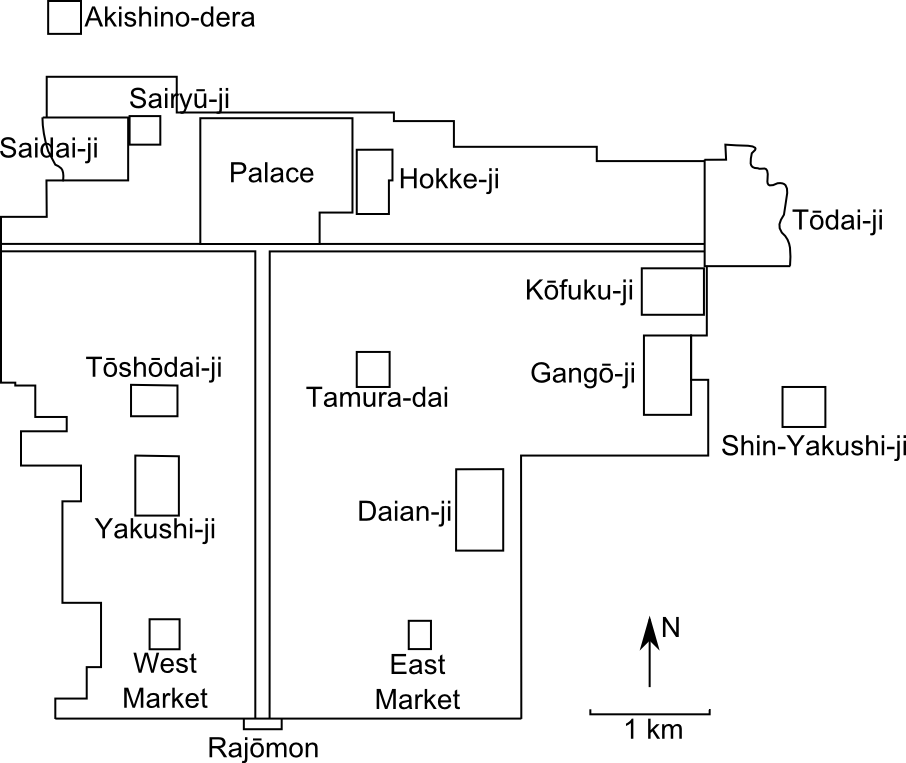
Map of the major sites of Heijō-kyō

Heijō-kyō (平城京; also Heizei-kyō, sometimes Nara no miyako) was the Capital of Japan during most of the Nara period, from 710 to 740 and again from 745 to 784. The imperial palace is a listed UNESCO World Heritage Site together with other places in the city of Nara (cf. Historic Monuments of Ancient Nara).

Empress Genmei ordered the Imperial capital moved from Fujiwara-kyō to Heijō-kyō in 708, and the move to Heijō-kyō was complete in 710. Heijō-kyō was modeled after Chang'an, the capital of Tang-dynasty China, although Heijō-kyō lacked walls. In the city, merchants and traders from China, Korea, and India introduced various foreign cultures to Heijō-kyō through the Silk Road. As a result, Heijō-kyō flourished as Japan's first international and political capital, with a peak population of between 50,000 and 100,000. The overall form of the city was an irregular rectangle, and the area of the city was more than 25 km^{2}.

== Heijō-kyō Suzaku-ōji ==
The Heijō-kyō Suzaku-ōji (平城京朱雀大路跡), the central street of Heijō-kyō, was located between Nijō-ōji Minami and Sanjō-ōji in modern Nara city. In 1984, the 220-meter stretch from the Heijō-kyō ruins to Ōmiya-dōri to the south was designated as a National Historic Site. The avenue, which stretched 3.7 kilometer from north to south, from the Rajōmon Gate, the main entrance to Heijō-kyō in the south, to the Suzakumon Gate, the main gate on the south side of the palace complex, was designed not only to function as a road, but also to accommodate the passage of foreign envoys, and its size and the surrounding streetscape were designed to be spectacular.

Excavations conducted since 1974 have clarified the route of the street, and it has been revealed that the width is about 74 meters between the centers of the east-and-west side gutters, and that the distance between the east and west embankments in Sanjō is about 85 meters. The remains of a previous 23 meter wide road were also discovered below the Nara period road. In 2010, a portion of the Heijō-kyō Suzaku-ōji, measuring 70 meters wide and 210 meters long, was restored from the south side of Suzakumon Gate.

== Architecture ==
In the area of Heijō-kyō, there are ancient Buddhist temples, and some temples are also listed as a UNESCO World Heritage Site together with Heijō Palace.

- Daian-ji (大安寺)
- Daigokuden (大極殿, reconstruction)
- Gangō-ji (元興寺)
- Kōfuku-ji (興福寺)
- Saidai-ji (西大寺)
- Suzakumon (朱雀門, reconstruction)
- Tōdai-ji (東大寺)
- Yakushi-ji (薬師寺)
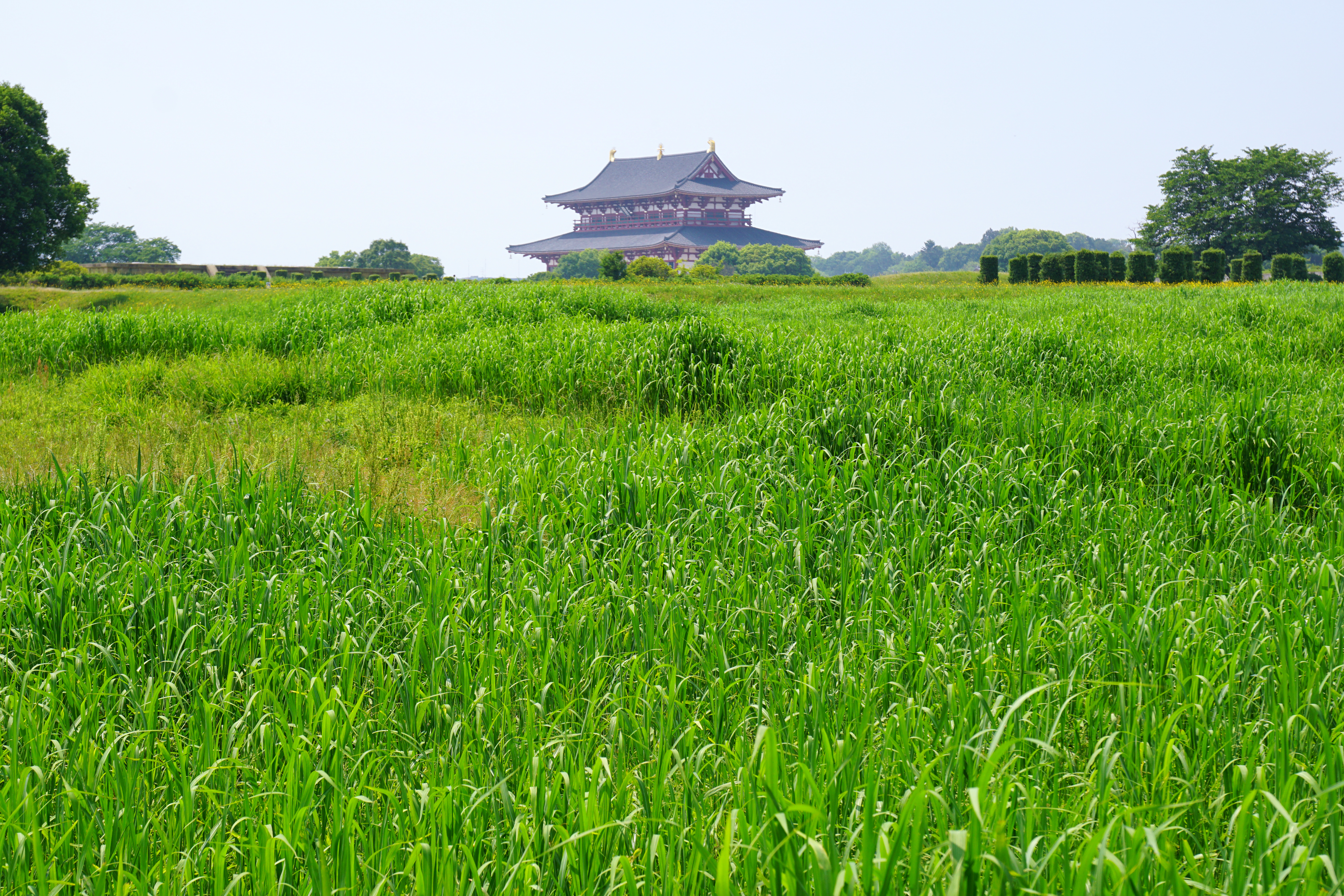
Heijō-kyō ruins

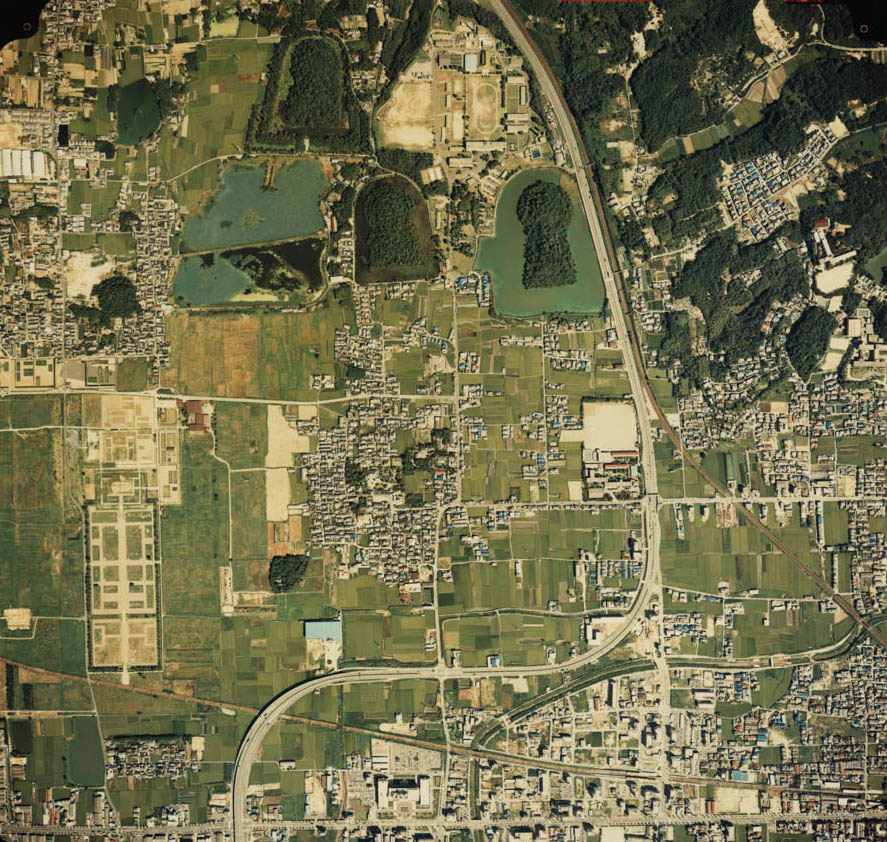
Satellite view of Heijō-kyō site (平城宮趾)

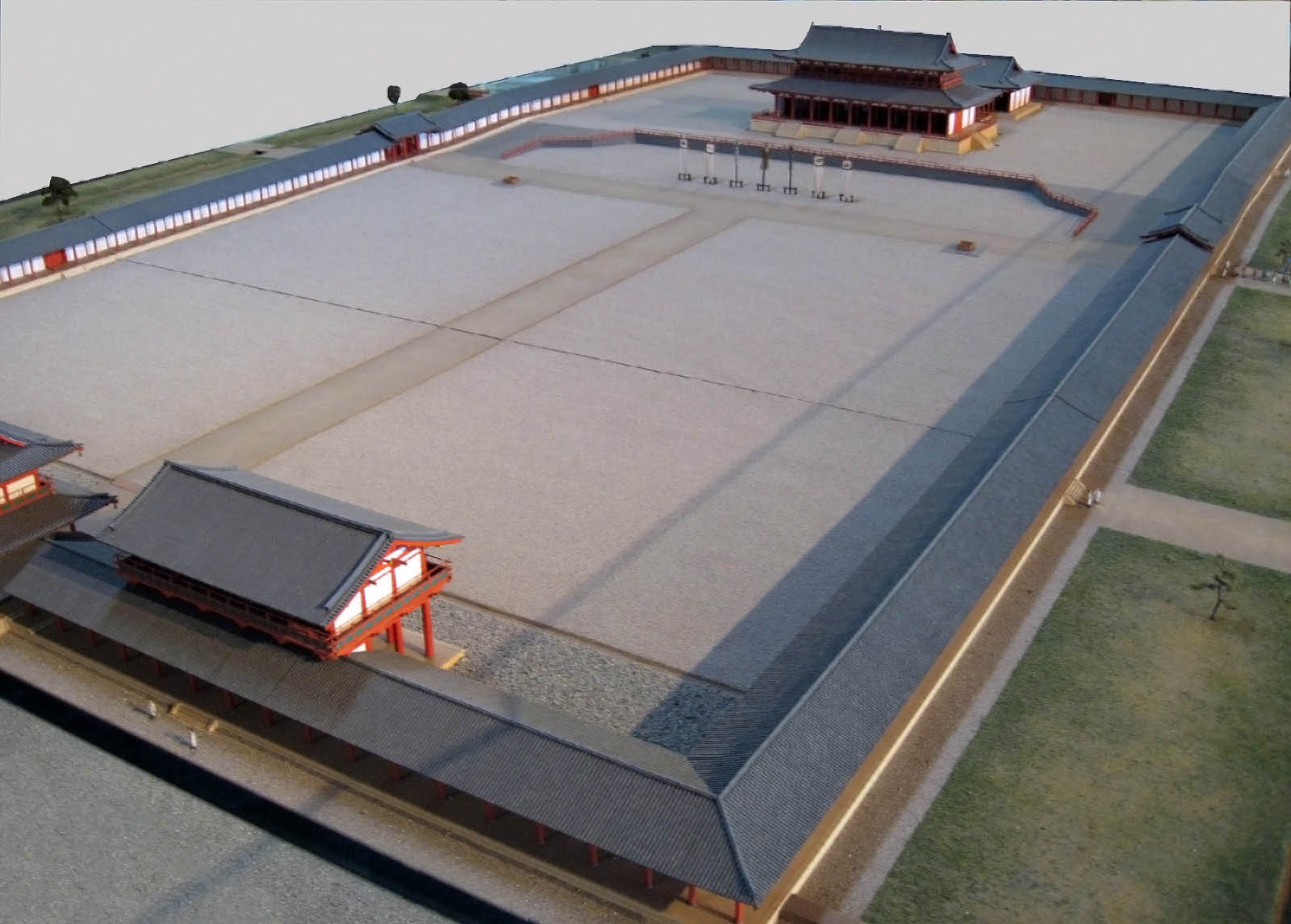
Miniature model of the Heijō Palace

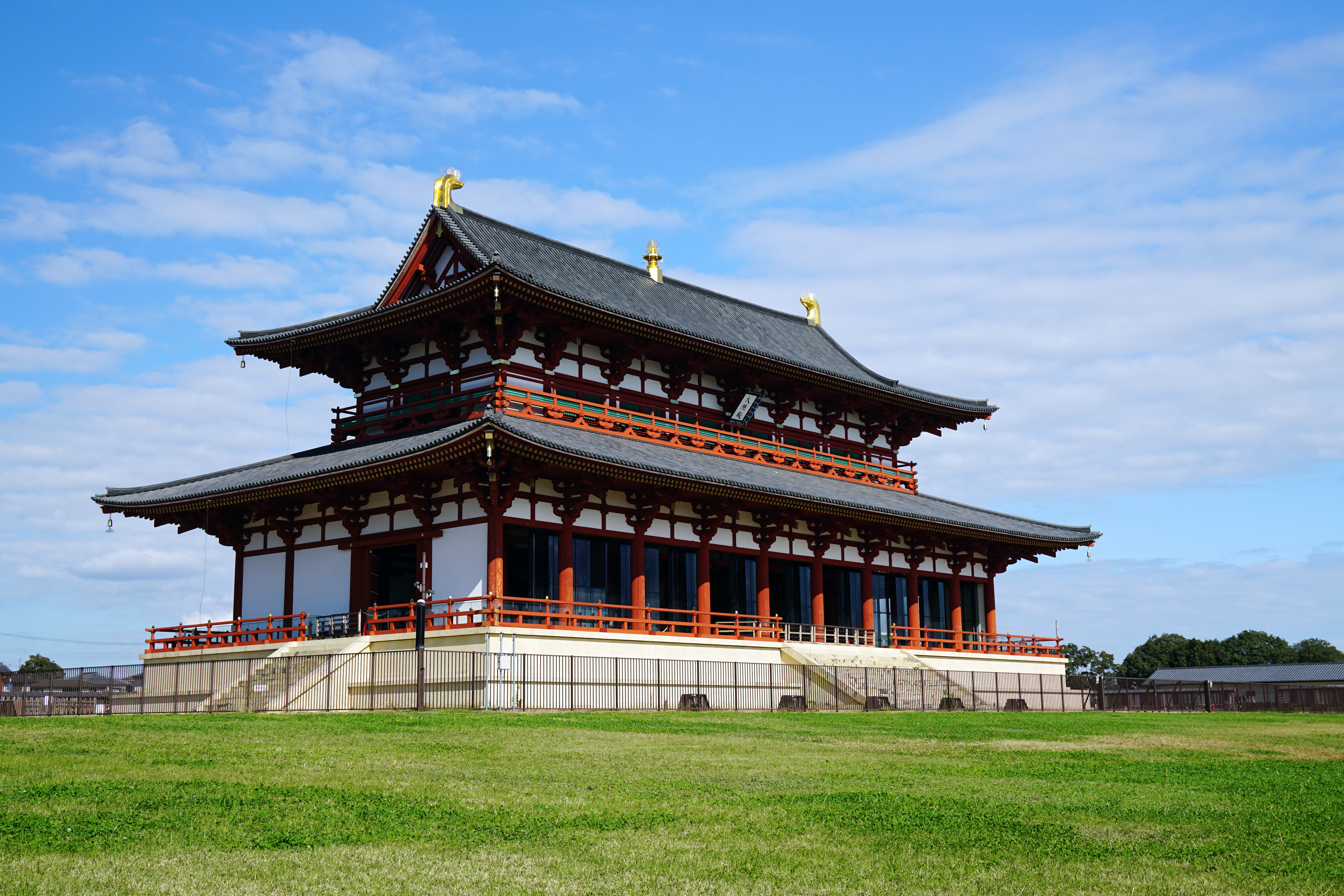
The Daigokuden, the main building to Heijo Palace

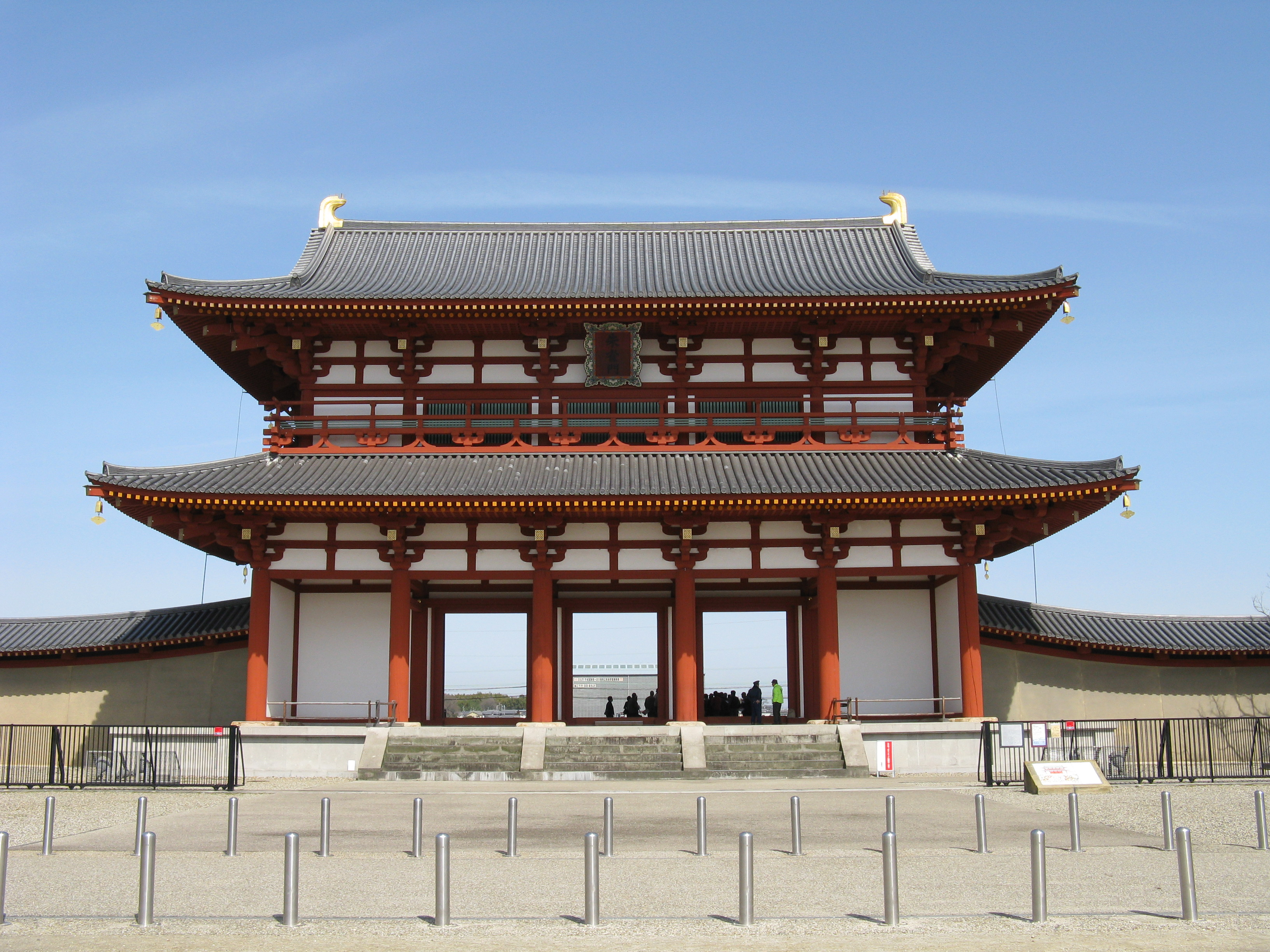
The Suzakumon, the main entrance to Heijo Palace

== 1,300th anniversary ==
The year 2010 marked the passage of 1,300 years since the establishment of Nara Heijō-kyō. Commemorative events of the 1,300th anniversary of Nara Heijō-kyō Capital (Japanese:平城遷都1300年祭) were held in and around Nara Prefecture from April 24 to November 7, 2010. These events included special displays of national treasures and other cultural properties, walking events that explore famous places in Nara, and traditional events in various places throughout Nara.

- Main Event Site – Heijō-kyō Capital Area (平城宮跡)

A：Entrance Plaza
●Heijō Palace Site Tour Center
●Corporate Participation Hall
B：Heijō History Museum/Full-Scale Replica of Japanese Diplomatic Ship for Envoys to Tang China
C：Suzaku Gate Plaza
●Suzaku Gate
D：Exchange Plaza
●Mahoroba Stage
●Exchange Hall
E：Heijō Palace Site Museum
F：Front Courtyard of the Former Imperial Audience Hall
G：South Gate Plaza
●Tempyo period costume rental area
H：Heijō-kyō Hands-on Learning Plaza
●Heijō-kyō Hands-on Learning Center
●Ministry of the Imperial Household
I：Excavation Site Exhibition Hall
J：Eastern Palace Garden Plaza
●Eastern Palace Garden

- Other Events Site

Ikaruga and Shigi-san Areas (cf. Ikaruga, 斑鳩・信貴山)
Asuka and Fujiwara Areas (cf. Asuka, 飛鳥・藤原)
Katsuragi Area (葛城)
Yoshino Area (cf. Mount Yoshino, 吉野)
Yamato Kogen Plains and Uda Area (大和高原・宇陀)

== See also ==
- Heijō Palace – Imperial palace
- Historic Monuments of Ancient Nara – UNESCO World Heritage Site
- List of Special Places of Scenic Beauty, Special Historic Sites and Special Natural Monuments

Preceded by Fujiwara-kyō	Capital of Japan; 710–740	Succeeded by Kuni-kyō
Preceded by Shigaraki Palace	Capital of Japan; 745–784	Succeeded by Nagaoka-kyō
