= Capital of Japan =

Historical aspects of the capital cities of Japan

The capital of Japan is Tokyo. Throughout its history, Japan has had capitals at locations other than Tokyo. Heijō-kyō, in present-day Nara, became the imperial capital in 710, following earlier capitals in the Asuka and Fujiwara areas. Kyoto served as the imperial capital from 794 until the Emperor and the government moved to Tokyo in 1868–1869, a move that was never formally proclaimed by edict.

== Legal status ==
No law currently in force directly designates Tokyo as the capital of Japan. Several laws use the term "capital area" (首都圏, shuto-ken), which includes Tokyo. Article 2 of the Metropolitan Area Readjustment Act (首都圏整備法) of 1956 defines the capital area as the broad area comprising the territory of the Tokyo Metropolis together with surrounding areas designated by Cabinet order; the definition sets the scope of that Act and does not by itself designate Tokyo as the national capital. The 1956 Act repealed the Capital Construction Act (首都建設法, Act No. 219 of 1950), Article 1 of which stated that its purpose was to plan and build Tokyo as the capital of the nation, and Article 12 of which referred to Tokyo as the national capital.

Other statutes that have used the term "capital area" include the Capital Expressway Public Corporation Law (首都高速道路公団法), the Capital Area Greenbelt Preservation Law (首都圏近郊緑地保全法), the Act on Arrangement of Suburban Development and Redevelopment Areas and Urban Development Areas in Metropolitan Area (首都圏の近郊整備地帯及び都市開発区域の整備に関する法律), the Act on State's Special Financial Measures on Arrangement of Suburban Development and Redevelopment Areas, etc. in Tokyo Metropolitan Area, Kinki Area and Chubu Area (首都圏、近畿圏及び中部圏の近郊整備地帯等の整備のための国の財政上の特別措置に関する法律), and the Act on Special Measures for Tokyo Inland Earthquakes (首都直下地震対策特別措置法).

In February 2018, Seiji Osaka, a member of the House of Representatives, submitted a written question to the government about the legal status of Japan's capital. In its written reply of 13 February 2018, the Cabinet under Prime Minister Shinzo Abe stated that no law directly designates Tokyo as the capital, but that Tokyo's status as Japan's capital is "widely accepted by society at large".

== History ==
Traditionally, the home of the Emperor is considered the capital. From 794 through 1868, the Emperor lived in Heian-kyō, modern-day Kyoto. After 1868, the seat of the Government of Japan and the Emperor's residence were moved to Edo, which was renamed Tokyo. The word now used for a national capital, shuto (首都), was not applied to Kyoto while it was the seat of the Emperor: it appears in an 1862 English–Japanese dictionary as a translation of the English word "capital", but was not in general use in the early Meiji period.

=== Transfer to Tokyo and the status of Kyoto ===
During the Meiji Restoration, several proposals for relocating the capital were put forward. These included Ōkubo Toshimichi's proposal to move it to Osaka and a plan drafted by Ōki Takatō and associated with Etō Shinpei for "eastern and western capitals" (東西両京, tōzai ryōkyō), under which Edo would become an "eastern capital" on an equal footing with Kyoto and the Emperor would move between the two. In the seventh month of 1868 (3 September 1868 in the Gregorian calendar), an imperial edict renamed Edo as Tokyo ("Eastern Capital"). The Emperor arrived in Tokyo later that year (26 November 1868), and Edo Castle was renamed Tokyo Castle. He returned to Kyoto at the end of the year and travelled to Tokyo again in 1869. On the 28th day of the third month (9 May 1869), after his arrival, Tokyo Castle was renamed the Imperial Castle (皇城, kōjō). The Daijō-kan (Great Council of State) was also moved to Tokyo, while an office of the rusukan (留守官) was left in Kyoto. The Emperor did not return to reside in Kyoto after this second journey. Historian Katsu Sasaki regards this renaming as the point at which the capital was effectively transferred.

Unlike many earlier relocations of the capital, which were proclaimed by imperial edict, no edict, proclamation or official government statement announcing a transfer of the capital to Tokyo was issued. Instead of "relocating" the capital (遷都, sento), the government spoke of "establishing" it (奠都, tento). According to the Edo-Tokyo Museum, sento is thought to have been avoided deliberately because it implied that Kyoto had ceased to be the capital, out of consideration for conservatives in the new government and for the residents of Kyoto; an article published by the Ministry of Land, Infrastructure, Transport and Tourism similarly states that the government left the move without official status to avoid strong opposition from the court nobility and the townspeople of Kyoto. The Ministry of Education's official history of the Restoration, Ishin-shi (維新史, 1941), refers to "establishing Tokyo as the capital" (東京奠都, Tōkyō-tento) rather than "transferring the capital to Tokyo" (東京遷都, Tōkyō-sento), while a contemporary high-school history textbook describes the capital (shuto) as having moved from Kyoto to Tokyo in 1869 without using the term sento.

Some Meiji-era figures maintained that Kyoto had retained its standing. The National Learning scholar Inoue Yorikuni argued that the government had never designated Tokyo as an imperial capital (帝都, teito) and that Japan could have more than one, citing the Imperial Household Law of 1889, which required the enthronement ceremony and the Daijōsai to be held in Kyoto. The statesman Fukuoka Takachika described Tokyo as having been only a temporary court (行在所, anzaisho) until the Emperor moved into the new palace in 1889. The enthronements of the Taishō and Shōwa emperors took place in Kyoto. The Imperial House Law of 1947 did not retain the requirement, and the Heisei and Reiwa enthronements were held in Tokyo, using the Takamikura and Michōdai thrones kept at the Kyoto Imperial Palace. Conversely, an imperial rescript issued after the 1923 Great Kantō earthquake described Tokyo as the capital of the Empire and declared that it would not lose its status as the national capital.

Since 2013, Kyoto's prefectural and city governments, together with local business, academic and cultural leaders, have promoted the "Sōkyō concept" (双京構想, Sōkyō kōsō; "twin capitals concept"), under which members of the Imperial family would also live in Kyoto so that Tokyo, as the political and economic capital, and Kyoto, as the historical and cultural capital, would jointly serve as the nation's capital (miyako). The proposal was first set out in "Kyoto Vision 2040", the 2013 final report of a forum that included the governor of Kyoto Prefecture and the mayor of Kyoto. After the 2017 law permitting Emperor Akihito's abdication, Mayor Daisaku Kadokawa said the city would ask the central government to study having some members of the Imperial family move to Kyoto.

The absence of a formal edict is still invoked in Japan, particularly in Kyoto, as grounds for saying that Kyoto never formally ceased to be a capital. In July 2026, asked whether Kyoto Prefecture would seek designation as a "secondary capital" (see below), Governor Takatoshi Nishiwaki said that it had no intention of doing so at that stage. He remarked that some people asked whether Kyoto, having originally been the capital, should be content with being a "secondary" one, stressing that he was quoting others rather than giving his own view, and added that the relocation of the Agency for Cultural Affairs demonstrated Kyoto's position as the capital of culture. No Japanese statute designates any city as the capital (see Legal status).

=== Relocation of capital functions ===
Proposals to relocate some of Japan's central government functions from Tokyo were discussed from the late 1970s. The Diet adopted a resolution on the relocation of the Diet and other national organizations in 1990, and the Act for Relocation of the Diet and Other Organizations was enacted in 1992. A 1995 report set out criteria for a new site, including a location approximately 60–300 kilometres from Tokyo (about one to two hours away by train) and an international airport no more than about 40 minutes' travel from the proposed city centre. In 1999, a government council selected the Tochigi–Fukushima area and the Gifu–Aichi area as candidate sites. It also identified the Mie-Kio area, spanning parts of Mie, Shiga, Kyoto and Nara prefectures, as a possible candidate if a new high-speed transport network were developed; the Ibaraki area was expected to support the Tochigi–Fukushima area. These proposals concerned the relocation of capital functions, particularly the Diet and other national organizations, rather than moving the Imperial Palace or the Emperor's residence, and the government explicitly distinguished the relocation of capital functions from the relocation of the capital itself.

During the 2000s, proposals continued to focus on relocating some central government functions, with Tokyo remaining the capital. The initiative was generally described as the "relocation of capital functions" or the "relocation of the Diet and other organizations", rather than as the relocation of the capital itself.

In 2023, the Government of Japan moved the Agency for Cultural Affairs to Kyoto. This was the first time that a central government office had been relocated outside Tokyo since the capital moved there.

In July 2026, the Diet enacted the Act on the Promotion of Measures to Ensure the Continuity of National and Social Functions and to Develop a Secondary Capital (国家社会機能継続性確保施策及び副首都の整備に係る施策の推進に関する法律, Law No. 78 of 2026); the House of Councillors passed it by 123 votes to 121. The Act was promulgated on 31 July 2026 and came into force on 30 October 2026. It establishes a framework under which the Prime Minister designates a prefecture as a "secondary capital" (副首都, fuku-shuto) on that prefecture's application. A designated prefecture is expected both to provide a temporary substitute for all or most central capital functions if those functions cannot be maintained in the Tokyo area after a major disaster, and to serve as a core of a multipolar economic area. The requirements for designation, set out in a Cabinet Order adopted on 27 October 2026, include thresholds for population and economic size and the exclusion of areas at risk from a Tokyo inland earthquake or an eruption of Mount Fuji; four prefectures (Hokkaido, Aichi, Osaka and Fukuoka) were reported to meet them. Kyoto Prefecture has said that it does not intend to apply at this stage.

== List of capitals ==
=== Legendary ===
This list of traditional, legendary capital sites begins with the reign of Emperor Jimmu. The names of the imperial palaces are given in parentheses:

1. Kashihara, Yamato at the foot of Mount Unebi during the reign of Emperor Jimmu
2. Kazuraki, Yamato during the reign of Emperor Suizei
3. Katashiha, Kawachi during the reign of Emperor Annei
4. Karu, Yamato during the reign of Emperor Itoku.
5. Waki-no-kami, Yamato during the reign of Emperor Kōshō
6. Muro, Yamato during the reign of Emperor Kōan
7. Kuruda, Yamato during the reign of Emperor Kōrei
8. Karu, Yamato during the reign of Emperor Kōgen
9. Izakaha, Yamato during the reign of Emperor Kaika
10. Shika, Yamato (Palace of Mizugaki) during the reign of Emperor Sujin
11. Shika, Yamato (Palace of Tamagaki) during the reign of Emperor Suinin
12. Makimuko, Yamato (Palace of Hishiro) during the reign of Emperor Keikō
13. Shiga, Ōmi (Palace of Takaanaho) during the reign of Emperor Seimu
14. Ando, Nara (Palace of Toyoura) and Kashiki on the island of Kyushu during the reign of Emperor Chūai

=== Historical ===
This list includes the names of the imperial palaces in parentheses.

Kofun period

- Karushima, Yamato (Palace of Akira), during the reign of Emperor Ōjin
- Naniwa, Settsu (Palace of Takatsu), during the reign of Emperor Nintoku
- Iware, Yamato (Palace of Wakasakura), during the reign of Emperor Richū
- Tajihi, Kawachi (Palace of Shibakaki), during the reign of Emperor Hanzei
- Asuka, Yamato (Palace of Tohotsu), during the reign of Emperor Ingyō
- Isonokami, Yamato (Palace of Anaho), during the reign of Emperor Ankō
- Sakurai, Nara (Hatsuse no Asakura Palace), 457–479 during the reign of Emperor Yūryaku
- Sakurai, Nara (Iware no Mikakuri Palace), 480–484 during the reign of Emperor Seinei
- Asuka, Yamato (Chikatsu-Asuka-Yatsuri Palace), 485–487 during the reign of Emperor Kenzō
- Tenri, Nara (Isonokami Hirotaka Palace), 488–498 during the reign of Emperor Ninken
- Sakurai, Nara (Nimiki Palace), 499–506 during the reign of Emperor Buretsu

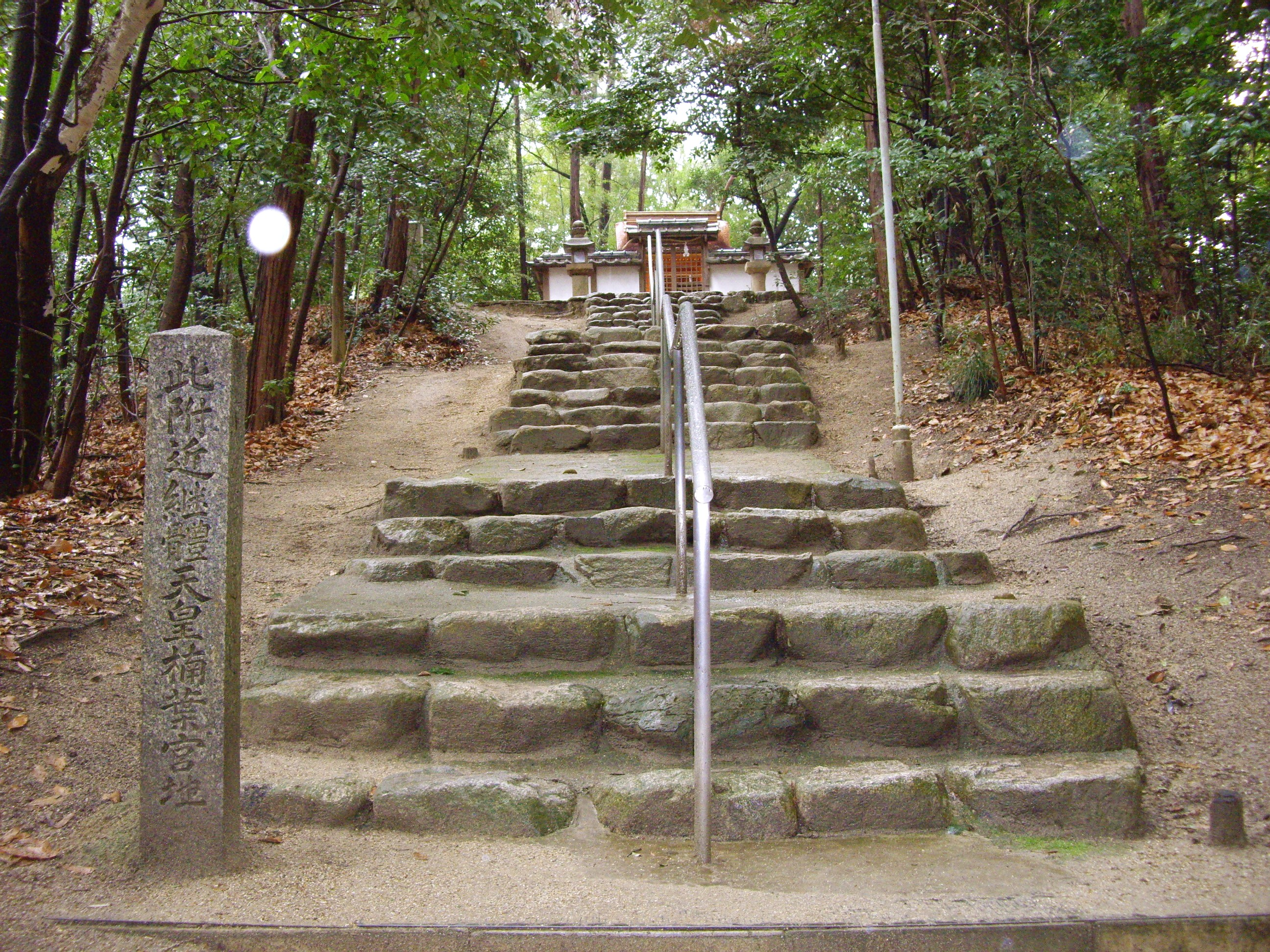
Traditional site of Kusuba-no-Miya Palace in Osaka Prefecture

- Hirakata, Osaka (Kusuba Palace), 507–511
- Kyōtanabe, Kyoto (Tsutsuki Palace), 511–518 during the reign of Emperor Keitai
- Nagaokakyō (Otokuni Palace), 518–526 during the reign of Keitai
- Sakurai, Nara (Iware no Tamaho Palace), 526–532 during the reign of Keitai
- Kashihara, Nara (Magari no Kanahashi Palace), 532–535 during the reign of Emperor Ankan
- Sakurai, Nara (Hinokuma no Iorino Palace), 535–539 during the reign of Emperor Senka

Asuka period

- Asuka, Yamato (Shikishima no Kanasashi Palace), 540–571 during the reign of Emperor Kinmei
- Kōryō, Nara (Kudara no Ohi Palace), 572–575
- Sakurai, Nara (Osata no Sakitama Palace or Osada no Miya), 572–585 during the reign of Emperor Bidatsu
- Shiki District, Nara (Iwareikebe no Namitsuki Palace), 585–587 during the reign of Emperor Yōmei
- Shiki District, Nara (Kurahashi no Shibagaki Palace), 587–592 during the reign of Emperor Sushun
- Asuka, Yamato (Toyura Palace or Toyura-no-miya), 593–603 during the reign of Empress Suiko
- Asuka, Yamato (Oharida Palace or Oharida-no-miya), 603–629 during the reign of Suiko
- Asuka, Yamato (Okamoto Palace or Okamoto-no-miya), 630–636 during the reign of Emperor Jomei
- Kashihara, Nara (Tanaka Palace or Tanaka-no-miya), 636–639
- Kōryō, Nara (Umayasaka Palace or Umayasaka-no-miya), 640
- Kōryō, Nara (Kudara Palace or Kudara-no-miya), 640–642
- Asuka, Yamato (Oharida Palace), 642–643
- Asuka, Yamato (Itabuki Palace or Itabuki no miya), 643–645 during the reign of Empress Kōgyoku
- Osaka (Naniwa Nagara-Toyosaki Palace), 645–654 during the reign of Emperor Kōtoku
- Asuka, Yamato (Itabuki Palace), 655 during the reign of Empress Saimei
- Asuka, Yamato (Kawahara Palace or Kawahara-no-miya), 655
- Asuka, Yamato (Okamoto Palace or Nochi no Asuka-Okamoto-no-miya), 656–660 during the reign of Emperor Saimei
- Asakura, Fukuoka (Asakura no Tachibana no Hironiwa Palace or Asakure no Tachibana no Hironiwa-no-miya), 660–661
- Osaka (Naniwa Nagara-Toyosaki Palace), 661–667
- Ōtsu, Shiga (Ōmi Ōtsu Palace or Ōmi Ōtsu-no-miya), 667–672 during the reign of Emperor Tenji and the reign of Emperor Kōbun
- Asuka, Yamato (Kiyomihara Palace or Kiomihara-no-miya), 672–694 during the reign of Emperor Tenmu and during the reign of Empress Jitō

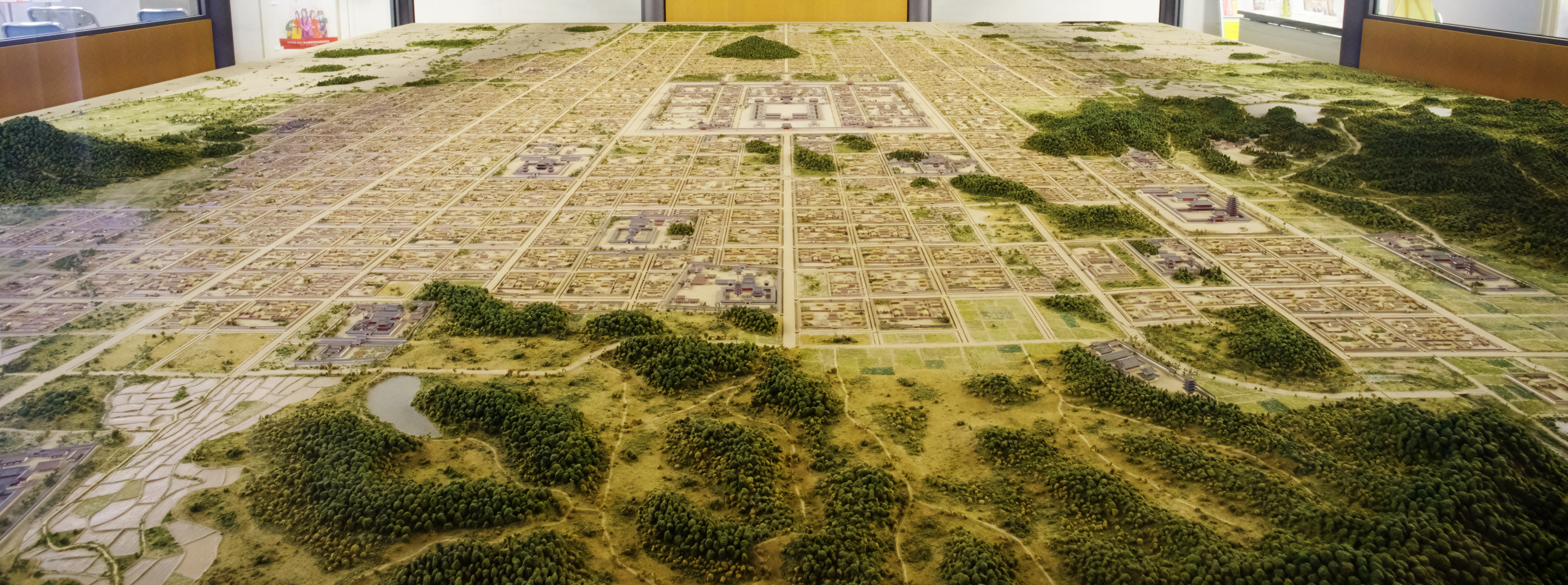
1/1000 scale model of Fujiwara-kyō, held by Kashihara-shi Fujiwara-kyō reference room

- Fujiwara-kyō (Fujiwara Palace), 694–710 during the reign of Emperor Monmu

Nara period

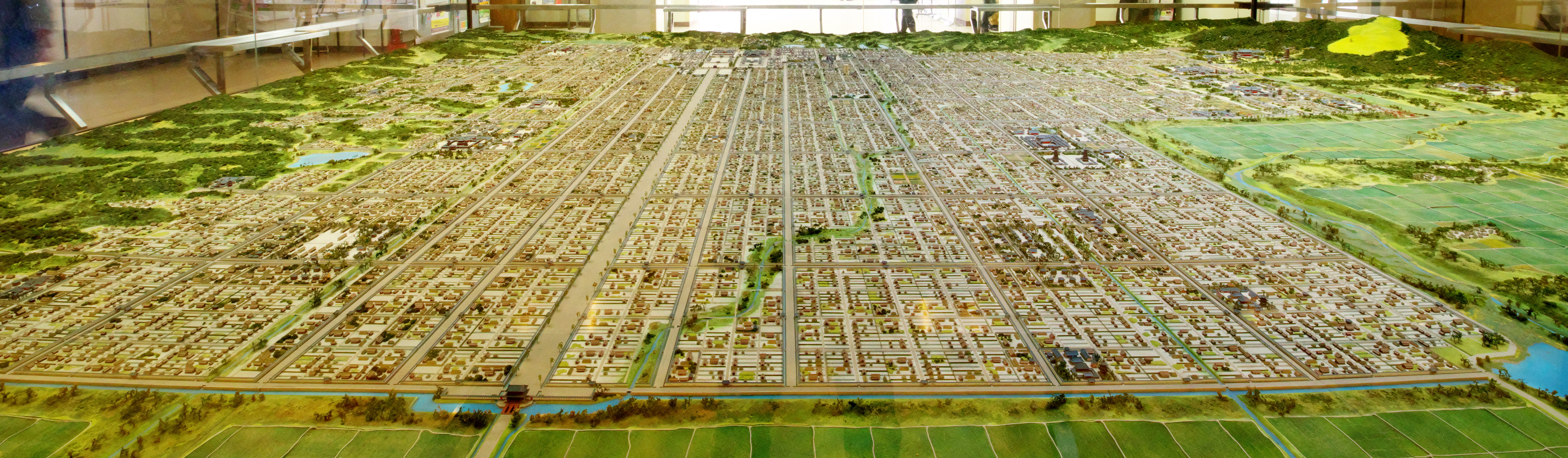
1/1000 scale model of Heijō-kyō, held by Nara City Hall

- Heijō-kyō (Heijō Palace), 710–740 during the reigns of Empress Genmei, Empress Genshō, and Emperor Shōmu
- Kuni-kyō (Kuni Palace), 740–744 during the reign of Emperor Shōmu
- Naniwa-kyō (Naniwa Palace), 744
- Shigaraki Palace (Ōmi Province), 744–745
- Heijō-kyō (Heijō Palace), 745–784
- Nagaoka-kyō (Nagaoka Palace), 784–794 during the reign of Emperor Kanmu

Heian period

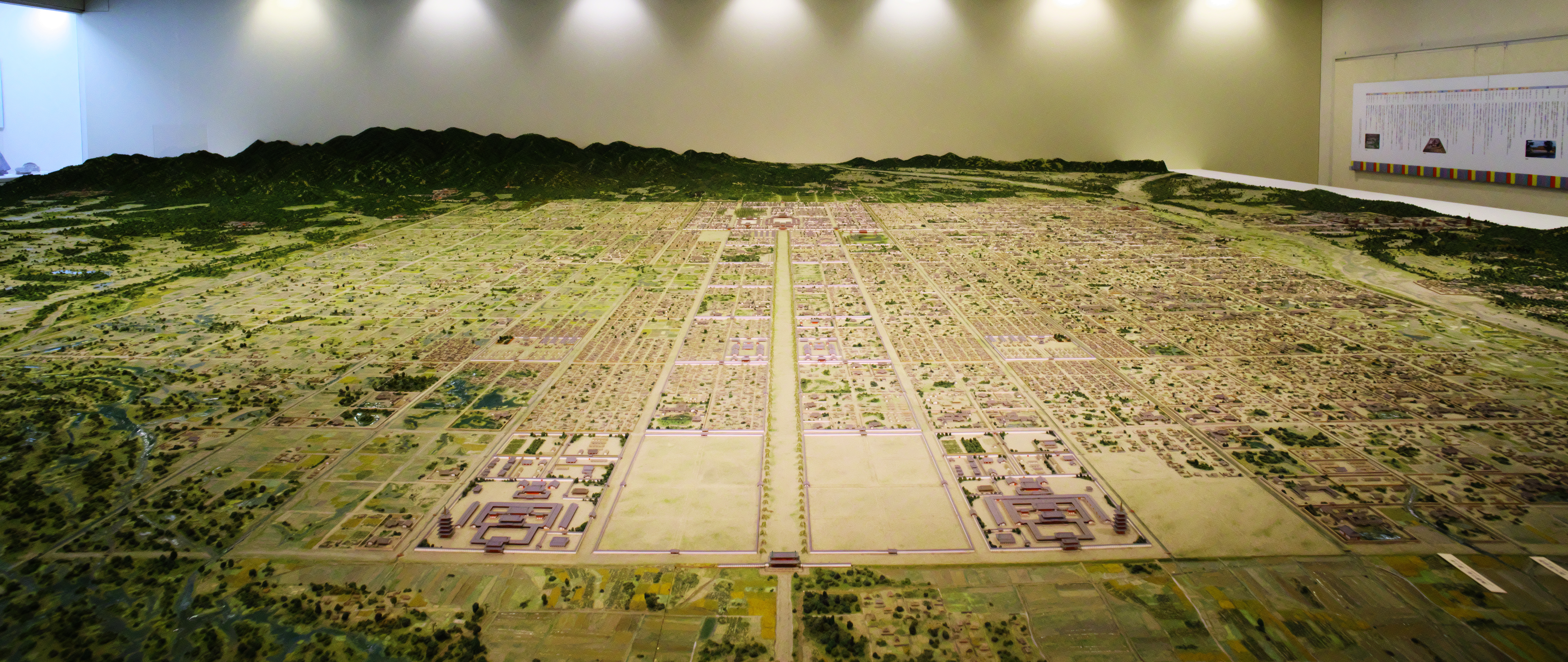
1/1000 scale model of Heian-kyō, held by Kyoto City Heiankyo Sosei-Kan Museum

- Heian-kyō (Heian Palace), 794–1180 during the reign of Emperor Kanmu and others
- Fukuhara Palace, 1180 during the reign of Emperor Antoku

Medieval Japan and early modern period (see also: History of Japan)

- Heian-kyō or Kyōto (Heian Palace), 1180–1868
- Yoshino (seat of the Southern Court during the Nanboku-chō period, rival to the Northern Court in Kyoto), 1336–1392

Modern Japan (see also: History of Japan)

- Tōkyō (Kōkyo), 1868–present

== Capitals of other historical polities in present-day Japan ==
- Hiraizumi was the political centre of the Northern Fujiwara (Ōshū Fujiwara) polity, which exercised substantial autonomy in the Tōhoku region from the 11th century until its defeat in 1189.
- Hakodate served as the capital of the short-lived Republic of Ezo in 1869.
- Shuri was the capital of the Ryukyu Kingdom from 1429 until 1879. Urasoe was an earlier political centre of Chūzan before the unification of the Ryūkyū Kingdom.

== See also ==
- List of capitals and largest cities by country
