= Naniwa-kyō =

Historical Japanese capital city in Osaka, Japan

- 難波京 (Japanese)
- Naniwa Palace Historic Park (Osaka city): The restored substructure of Daigokuden, before which there is a structure modeled after an Octagon House

- Naniwa-kyō Naniwa-kyō (Japan)
- Interactive map of Naniwa-kyō
- 34°40′50.35″N 135°31′23.8″E
- Periods: Asuka Period and Nara period
- Location: Osaka, Osaka Prefecture, Japan
- Region: Kansai region

Site notes
- Public access: Yes (park)

Naniwa-kyō (難波京) was a historical Japanese capital city, located in present-day central Osaka city.

Traces of ancient palaces in Naniwa were found in 1957. After the Kofun period, the Early Naniwa Palace was established as Japan's first capital in 651 during the Asuka period and is summed up with the Late Naniwa Palace that was established from 726 to 784 in the Nara period afterwards. Through more recent excavations, the existence of a city was confirmed, at least for the latter period in the 8th century.

Preceded by Kuni-kyō	Capital of Japan; 744	Succeeded by Shigaraki Palace
