= Naniwa Nagara-Toyosaki Palace =

Historical Palace in Osaka, Japan

Coordinates: 34°40′50.347″N 135°31′23.80″E

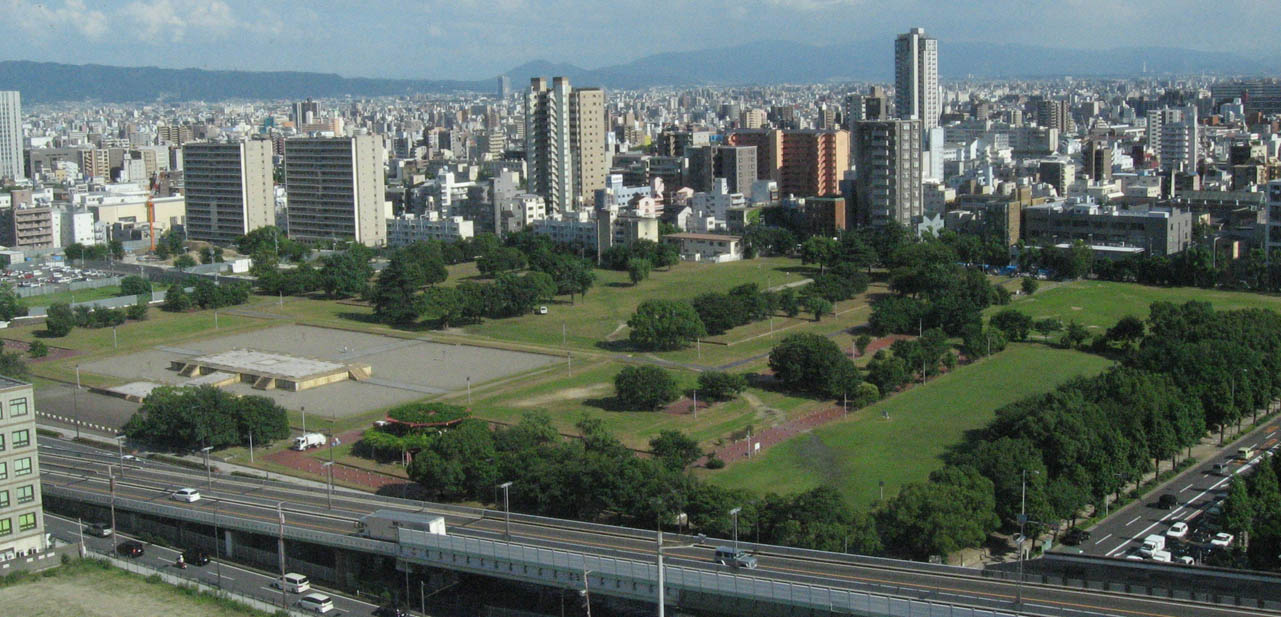
The Naniwa Palace Site Park

Naniwa Nagara-Toyosaki Palace (難波長柄豊碕宮, Naniwa-no-Nagara-no-Toyosaki-no-miya), is a historical palace which was located in present-day central Osaka, Japan. The palace of this period is also sometimes referred to as the Former Naniwa Palace (前期難波宮, zenki-Naniwa-no-miya) to distinguish it from the later, rebuilt Naniwa Palace built in the same location in 744 AD.

Construction of the palace was completed in 652 AD by Emperor Kōtoku and stood for 34 years before being destroyed in a fire in 686 AD.

== See also ==
- Naniwa-kyō

Preceded by Asuka	Capital of Japan; 645-654	Succeeded by Asuka
