= Asuka, Yamato =

Imperial capital of Japan during the Asuka period (538–710); now in Nara Prefecture

Coordinates: 34°28′56″N 135°48′47″E

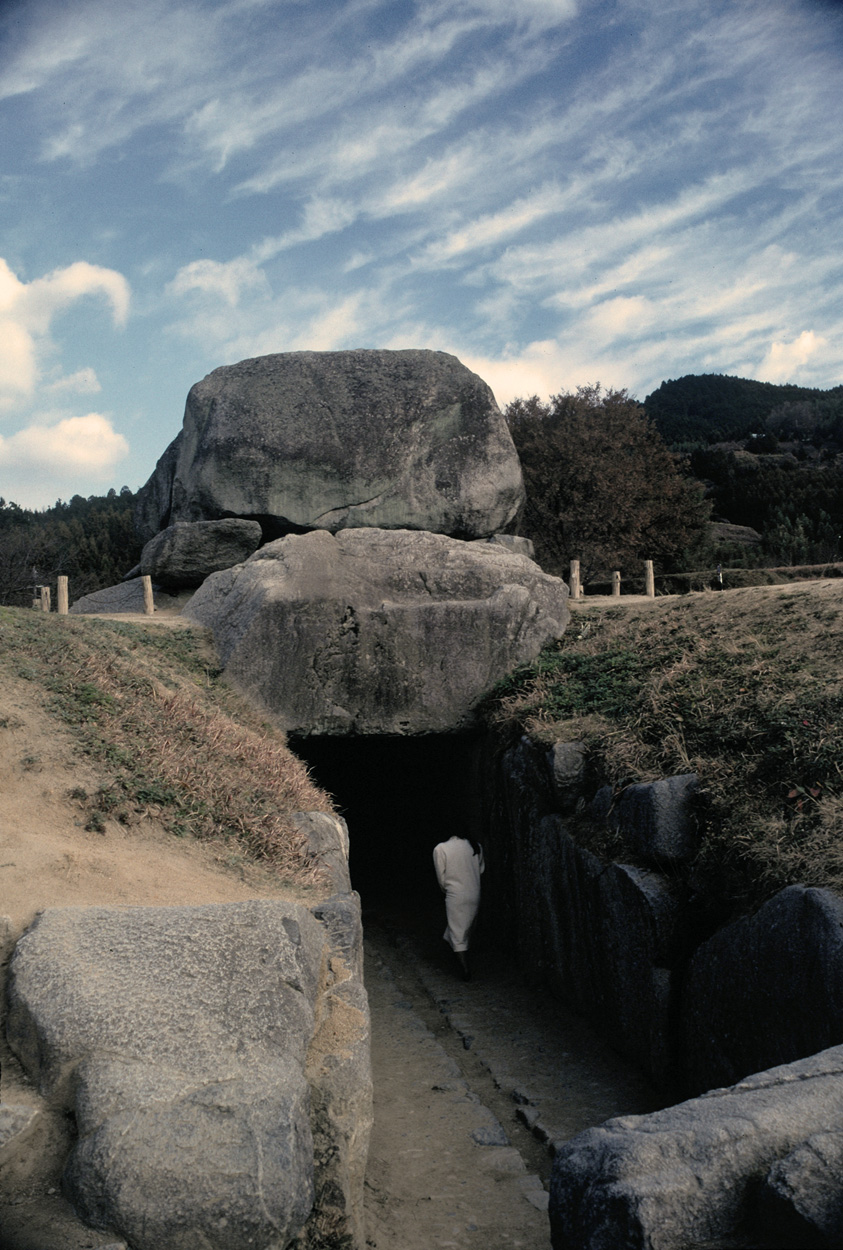
Ishibutai Kofun, believed to be the burial site of Soga no Umako (figure shows scale)

Asuka (飛鳥; Japanese pronunciation: [a.sɯ̥.ka], locally [aꜜ.sɯ̥.ka]) was the Imperial capital of Japan during the Asuka period (538 – 710 AD), which takes its name from this place. It is located in the present-day village of Asuka, Nara Prefecture.

== Etymology ==
Some of the many theories of what the place was named after include the bird common crossbill, or isuka in Japanese, or local geological features, e.g. 洲処 (suka, meaning sandbar, sandbank or delta) or 崩地 (asu) + 処 (ka). Or it may have been named in honor of Asuka (or Ashuku) Nyorai, the Japanese equivalent of Akshobhya, one of the Five Buddhas of Wisdom, who is still worshiped in the Asuka-dera (Asuka Temple), the Asuka-niimasu-jinja (the shrine for his manifestation as a Shinto god), and several other structures from those days.

== Archaeology ==
Archaeology projects continue to uncover relics from these ruins. Recent discoveries in the area include Wado coins, believed to be some of the oldest coins in Japan, and paintings in the Kitora and Takamatsuzuka Kofun, or tombs.

The Ishibutai Kofun is also located in Asuka. On March 12, 2004, the discovery of the remains of a residence's main building adjacent to the kofun was announced. It is likely that the residence belonged to Soga no Umako, who is believed to have been entombed in the kofun.

== Access ==
Asuka can be reached from either Okadera Station or Asuka Station on the Kintetsu train line, or by car on Route 169.

== Imperial palaces ==
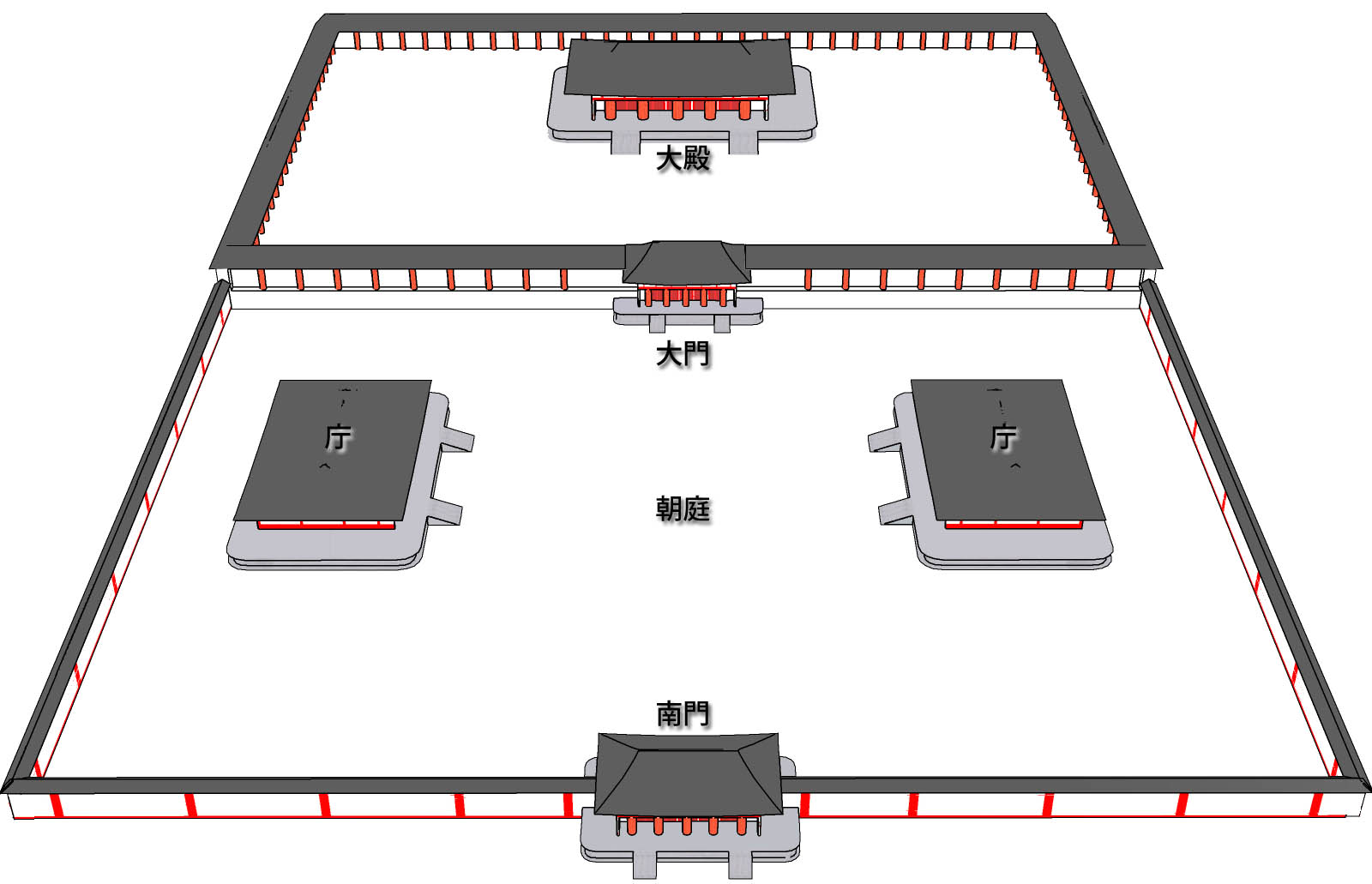
Layout of Oharida Palace

In the Asuka period, various palaces were constructed for each monarch. As soon as one emperor died, the whole court moved to a newly constructed palace, since it was considered dangerous and ominous to remain in a place where a deceased monarch's spirit might reside. Sometimes even during a single emperor's reign, palaces were changed multiple times due to destruction by fire or ill omens. Since these palaces were entirely constructed from wood, none of them have survived, although some archaeological work in modern times has uncovered such remains as stone bases for pillars.

Sakurai was briefly the capital of Japan during the reign of Emperor Ingyō. The life of the Imperial court was centered at the Palace of Tohotsu where the emperor lived in 457–479. Other emperors also built palaces at Asuka, including

- Chikatsu-Asuka-Yatsuri Palace, 485–487 in reign of Emperor Kenzō
- Shikishima no Kanasashi Palace, 540–571 in reign of Emperor Kinmei
- Toyura Palace or Toyura-no-miya, 593–603 in the reign of Empress Suiko
- Oharida Palace or Oharida-no-miya, 603–629 in the Suiko's reign
- Okamoto Palace or Okamoto-no-miya, 630–636 in the reign of Emperor Jomei
- Tanaka Palace, 636–40
- Umayasaka Palace, 640

In 640–642, the Imperial court briefly moved to the Kudara Palace in Kōryō, Nara; then the emperor returned to Asuka where he lived at

- Oharida Palace, 642–643
- Itabuki Palace or Itabuki no miya, 643–645 in the reign of Empress Kōgyoku

In 645–654, the court moved to the Naniwa Nagara-Toyosaki Palace in Osaka; then the capital moved back to Asuka when the emperor lived at

- Itabuki Palace, 655–655 in the reign of Emperor Kōtoku
- Kawahara Palace or Kawahara-no-miya, 655–655
- Okamoto Palace or Nochi no Asuka-Okamoto-no-miya, 656–660 in the reign of Empress Saimei

In 661–667, the court moved to the Tachibana no Hironiwa Palace (661–67) in Asakura, Fukuoka. Then the court moved again to the Ōmi Palace or Ōtsu Palace (667–72) in Ōmi-kyō (today Ōtsu, Shiga). Once more, the court moved back to Asuka at

- Kiyomihara Palace or Kiomihara-no-miya, 672–694 in the reign of Emperor Tenmu and in the reign of Empress Jitō

Asuka was abandoned by Empress Jitō when she and her court moved to Fujiwara-kyō.

== See also ==
- The 100 Views of Nature in Kansai

First	Capital of Japan; 538–710	Succeeded by Fujiwara-kyō
