= Shigaraki Palace =

- 紫香楽宮 (Japanese)
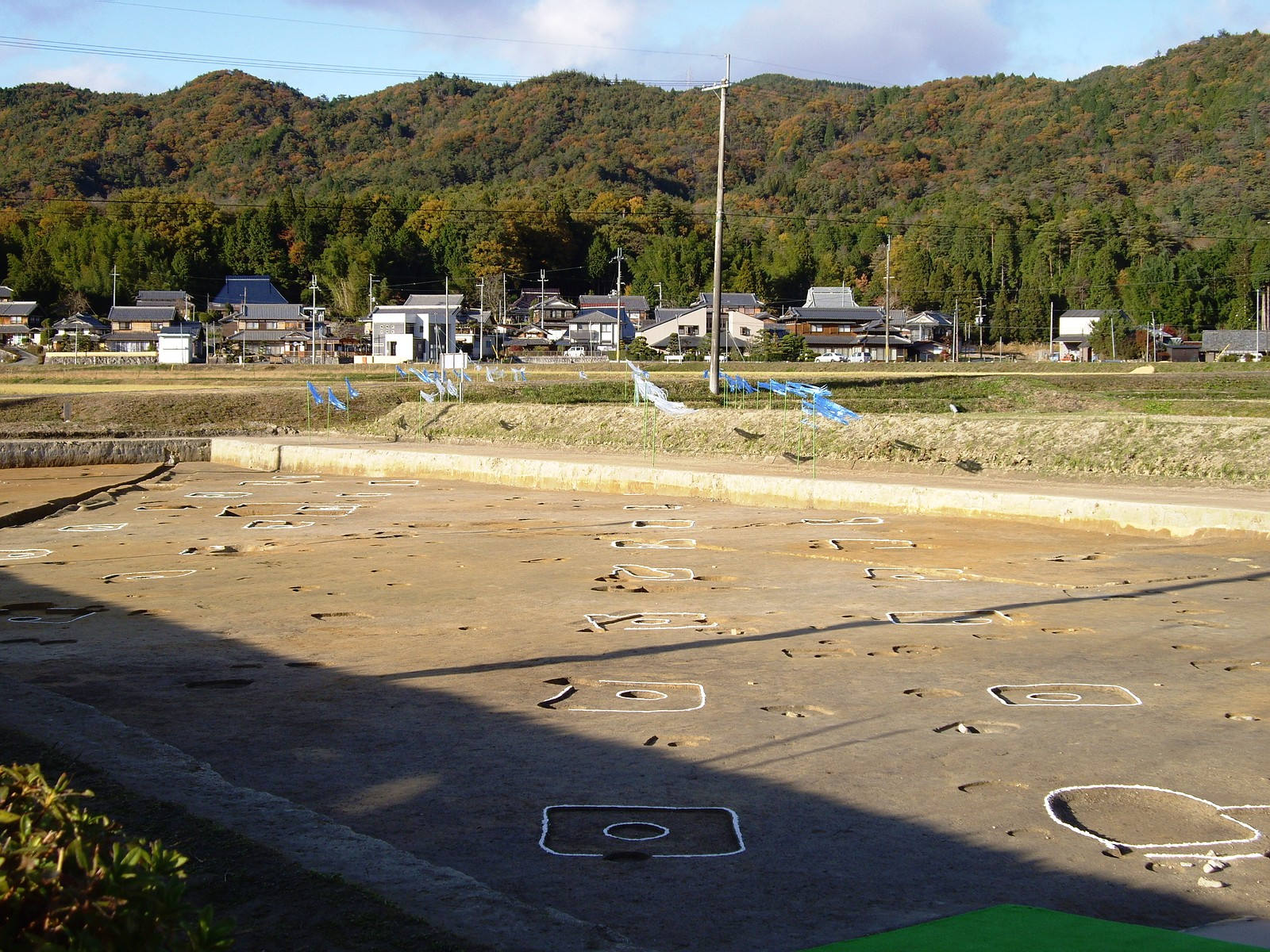
- Shigaraki Palace ruins

- Shigaraki Palace Shigaraki Palace (Japan)
- 34°56′05″N 136°05′04″E
- Type: settlement ruins
- Periods: Nara period
- Location: Kōka, Shiga, Japan
- Region: Kansai region

History
- Built: 8th century AD

Site notes
- Public access: Yes (no public facilities)

The Shigaraki Palace (紫香楽宮, Shigaraki-no-miya; also written 信楽宮) was an imperial palace built by Emperor Shōmu, initially as a villa, later named by himself as the capital of Japan in 744 AD. It was located in Kōka District of Ōmi Province in what is now part of the city of Kōka, Shiga Prefecture, Japan. The capital-palace is also referred to as Kōka Palace (甲賀宮, Kōka-no-miya) in the Shoku Nihongi. Its ruins were designated a National Historic Site of Japan in 1974.

== Overview ==
After the rebellion of Fujiwara no Hirotsugu in 740, Emperor Shōmu relocated his seat to Kuni-kyō (恭仁京) (currently part of Kizugawa, Kyoto) and also built a detached villa deep in the mountains of southern Ōmi, which was called "Rakumura". He often visited this villa and, in 742, decided to make it his primary residence.

There are various theories as to why Emperor Shōmu chose to relocate to such an inconvenient location deep in the mountains. The Kuni area was a power base for Tachibana no Moroe, who was then the minister with de facto power over the "dajō-kan" council. The preference of Shigaraki possibly points to the rival Fujiwara clan under Fujiwara no Nakamaro mounting a comeback, since their influence extended around the Shigaraki area in Ōmi Province. On the other hand, Emperor Shōmu may have been influenced by Buddhist prelates such as Rōben and Gyōki, who saw the area as a holy site. An indication of this is the plans Emperor Shōmu announced the following year for the construction of a monumental image of the Vairocana Buddha in emulation of the Longmen Grottoes in Tang dynasty China near the Shigaraki site.

In 744, the name of the palace gradually changed from "Shigaraki" to "Kōka", and in November of the same year, the central support pillar of the Vairocana Buddha statue was erected at Kōka-ji, a Buddhist temple which had been established to house the image. In 745, Kōka was officially proclaimed as the capital. However, the vast expense required for the project resulted in resistance by many of his vassals, and a series of natural disasters such as wildfires and the Tenpei Earthquake forced Emperor Shōmu to return to Heijō-kyō. The plan to build a giant statue in Shigaraki was transformed into the Nara Daibutsu project.

The actual site of the palace was lost for many years. Initially, ruins in the Urano neighborhood of Shigaraki were thought to be the site of the palace, and these ruins were given the National Historic Site designation in 1926. However, later archeologists located another possible site two kilometers to the north, in the Miyamachi neighborhood. The foundation of large buildings were uncovered, and artifacts included a large number of wooden tags indicating tax payments. This site was redesignated the "Shigaraki Palace ruins" in 2005, with the original site now thought to be the ruins of Kōka-ji.

The site is about 20 minutes on foot from Shigarakigushi Station on the Shigaraki Kogen Railway. The site was backfilled after excavation, but some of the artifacts can be seen at the Shigaraki Palace Remains Related Archaeological Site Research Office (紫香楽宮跡関連遺跡群調査事務所)

== See also ==
- List of Historic Sites of Japan (Shiga)

== Notes ==
Preceded by Naniwa-kyō	Capital of Japan; 745	Succeeded by Heijō-kyō
