= Fujiwara-kyō =

Ancient capital of Japan

Coordinates: 34°30′08″N 135°48′26″E

- 藤原京 (Japanese)
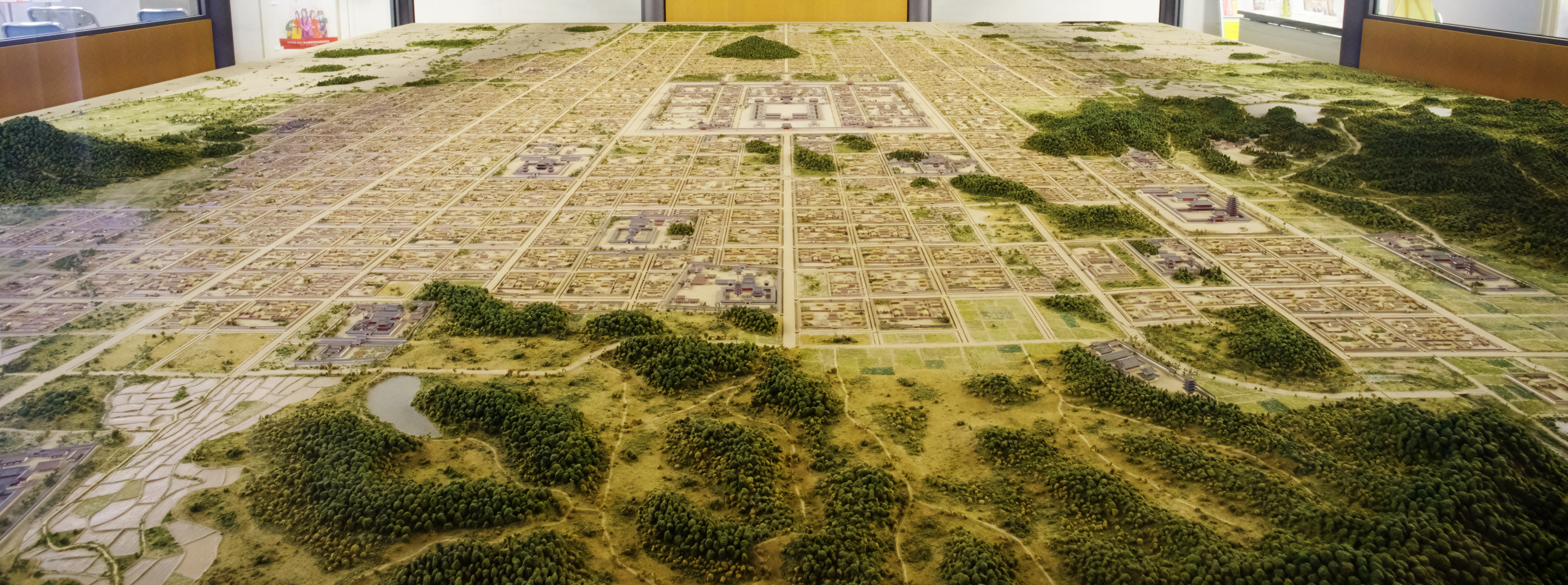
- 1/1000 scale model of Fujiwara-kyō

- Fujiwara-kyō Fujiwara-kyō (Japan)
- Type: settlement trace
- Periods: Asuka period
- Location: Kashihara, Nara, Japan
- Region: Kansai region

History
- Built: c.7th-8th century

Site notes
- Public access: Yes (park)
- Special National Historic Site of Japan

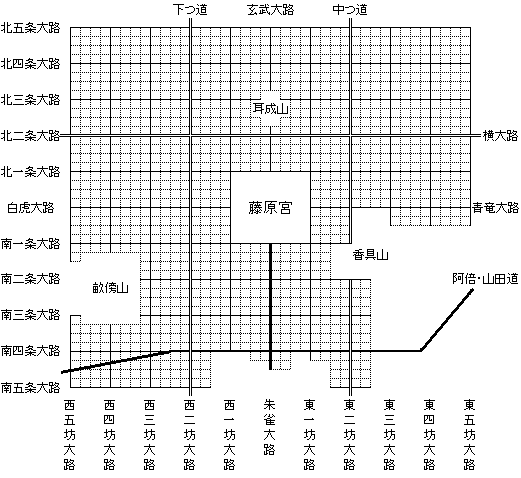
Map of Fujiwara-kyō

Fujiwara-kyō (藤原京) was the Imperial capital of Japan for sixteen years, between 694 and 710. It was located in Yamato Province (present-day Kashihara in Nara Prefecture), having been moved from nearby Asuka, and remained the capital until its relocation to Heijō-kyō, present-day Nara. It was the first in Japanese history to have been a planned city based on a square grid pattern modeled after Chang'an, the capital of Tang dynasty China.

== History ==
Per the Nihon Shoki, in the 5th year of Emperor Tenmu's reign (676), the emperor began selecting the site of a new capital. Construction work was carried out over a number of years, based on the different standards of grid-like grids discovered during excavations, and was halted by the emperor's death. It was resumed in 690 under Empress Jitō and continued under the reigns of Emperor Monmu and Empress Genmei. Empress Genmei (661–721) moved the capital from Fujiwara-kyō to Nara (then Heijō-kyō) in 710, mainly to carry out the wishes of her son Emperor Monmu (683–707), who was the previous occupant of the throne and had ordered in 697 to search for a new proper capital site.

According to Delmer Brown, the reason for Monmu to found a new capital may be that he was influenced by the ancient belief that a new Emperor should reign at a new capital and that Nara was intended to be the capital for his son Shōmu. Archaeological evidence indicates that construction of the corridor surrounding the palace was still ongoing even at the time the decision to move the capital to Heijō-kyō was made in 708, suggesting the possibility that Fujiwara-kyō was abandoned unfinished.

This waka poem, written by Empress Jitō, describes Fujiwara-kyō in the summer:

春すぎて夏来にけらし白妙の
衣ほすてふ天の香具山
haru sugite natsu kinikerashi shirotae no
koromo hosu chō Ama no Kaguyama
Spring has passed, it seems, and now summer has arrived;
For this, they say, is when robes of pure white are aired on heavenly Mount Kagu.
(Shin Kokin Wakashū 3:175; Hyakunin Isshu 2)

However, the name "Fujiwara-kyō" itself was never used in the Nihon Shoki; during those times it was recorded as Aramashi-kyō (新益京). The name "Fujiwara-kyō" was first coined in an academic paper in 1913 by Kida Sadakichi, a pioneer of Fujiwara-kyō research, with the justification that the imperial palace at the time was called "Fujiwara-miya" in the Nihon Shoki, and this term came to be the accepted academic nomenclature.

=== Fujiwara-kyō extent and layout ===
In early research, Fujiwara-kyō was assumed to be located inside the Yamato Sanzan (Mount Miminashi to the north, Mount Unebi to the west, and Mount Amanokagu to the east), and was thought to be a rectangle of 12 rows and 8 blocks measuring 2.1 kilometers east-to-west and 3.2 kilometers north-to-south, with Fujiwara Palace located slightly north of the center. However, with the discovery of the east-west Kyōgoku-ōji street in the 1990s, the complete layout is now thought to be 5.3 square kilometers (10 ri), or at least 25 km^{2}, surpassing both Heian-kyō (23 km^{2}) and Heijō-kyō (24 km^{2}), and encompassed the site of the old Asuka-kyō to the south.

A distinctive feature of the capital is that, unlike Heijo-kyō, and Heian-kyō, which were built in the Northern Court style with the palace and government offices in the north, Fujiwara Palace, which contained the Imperial Palace and government offices, was located almost in the center of the capital. It is believed that this was designed based on the ideal capital city construction described in the "Kaogongji" (Record of the Winter Palace) section of the Rites of Zhou (records of the Zhou dynasty), rather than imitating Chang'an, as a sign of Emperor Tenmu's rivalry with the Tang dynasty.

The grid pattern reflected an area of 5.3 kilometers east-to-west (20 grids) and 4.8 kilometers north-to-south (18 grids). Suzaku-oji, the main street, ran north and south from Fujiwara Palace, dividing the city into east and west halves. The Fujiwara-kyō Suzaku-oji was not as wide as later Heijō-kyō and Heian-kyō, which were more than 70 meters wide, but was instead very narrow at just over 24 meters wide (between the centers of the gutters). There is a theory that the Suzaku-oji and Rajōmon on the south side of the Asuka River were not developed in the capital due to lack of archaeological evidence and the presence of a number of large Buddhist temples in that area.

It is clear that the city also existed to the north of the palace. The grid pattern is thought to have been omitted in the area that covers the Yamato Sanzan mountains, but the group of kofun burial mounds in the site was leveled, except for the mausoleums of Emperor Jimmu and Emperor Suizei. Fujiwara-kyō did not have any external defenses, and there were no walls or fortified gates surrounding the capital.

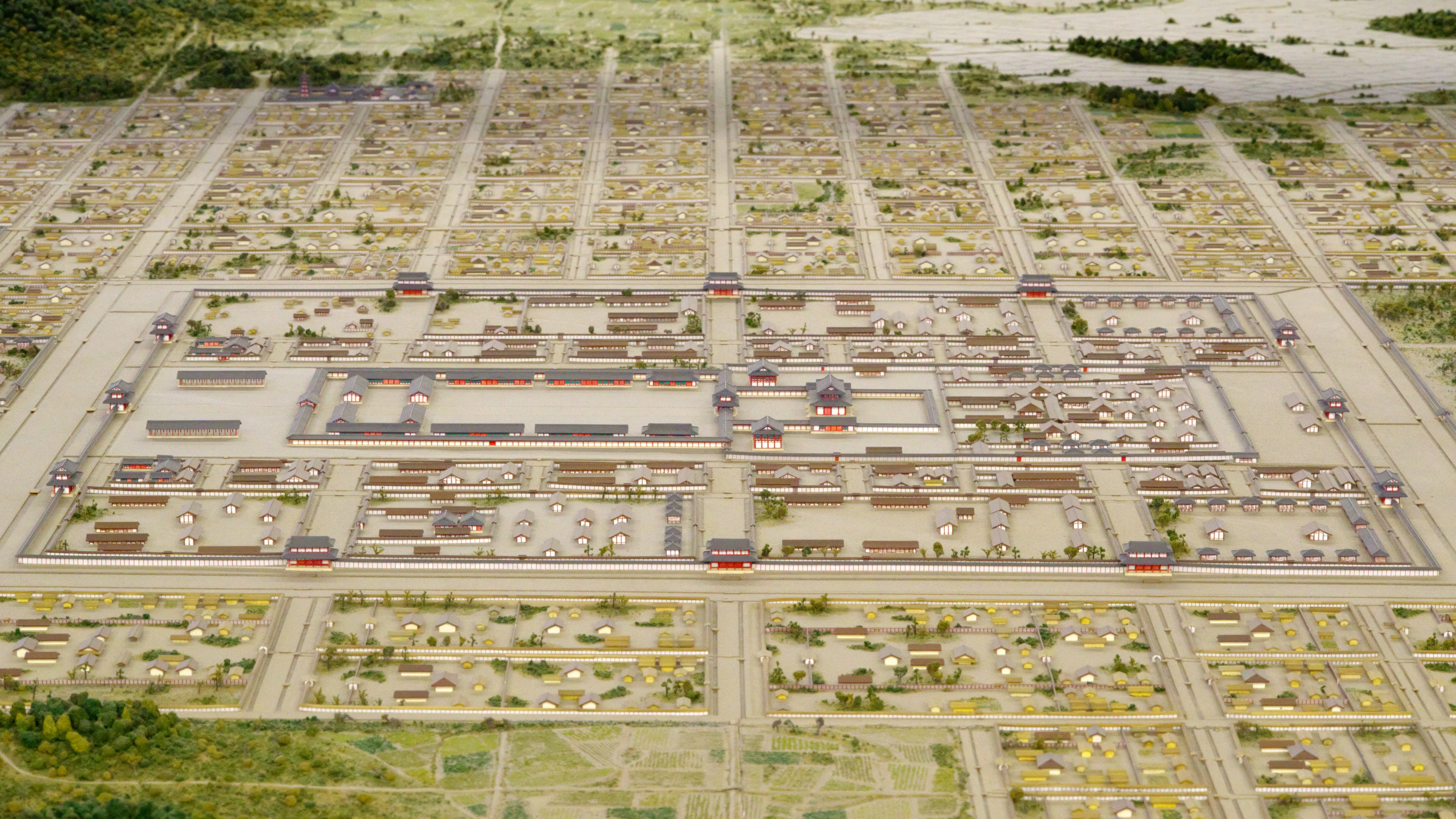
Scale model of Fujiwara Palace

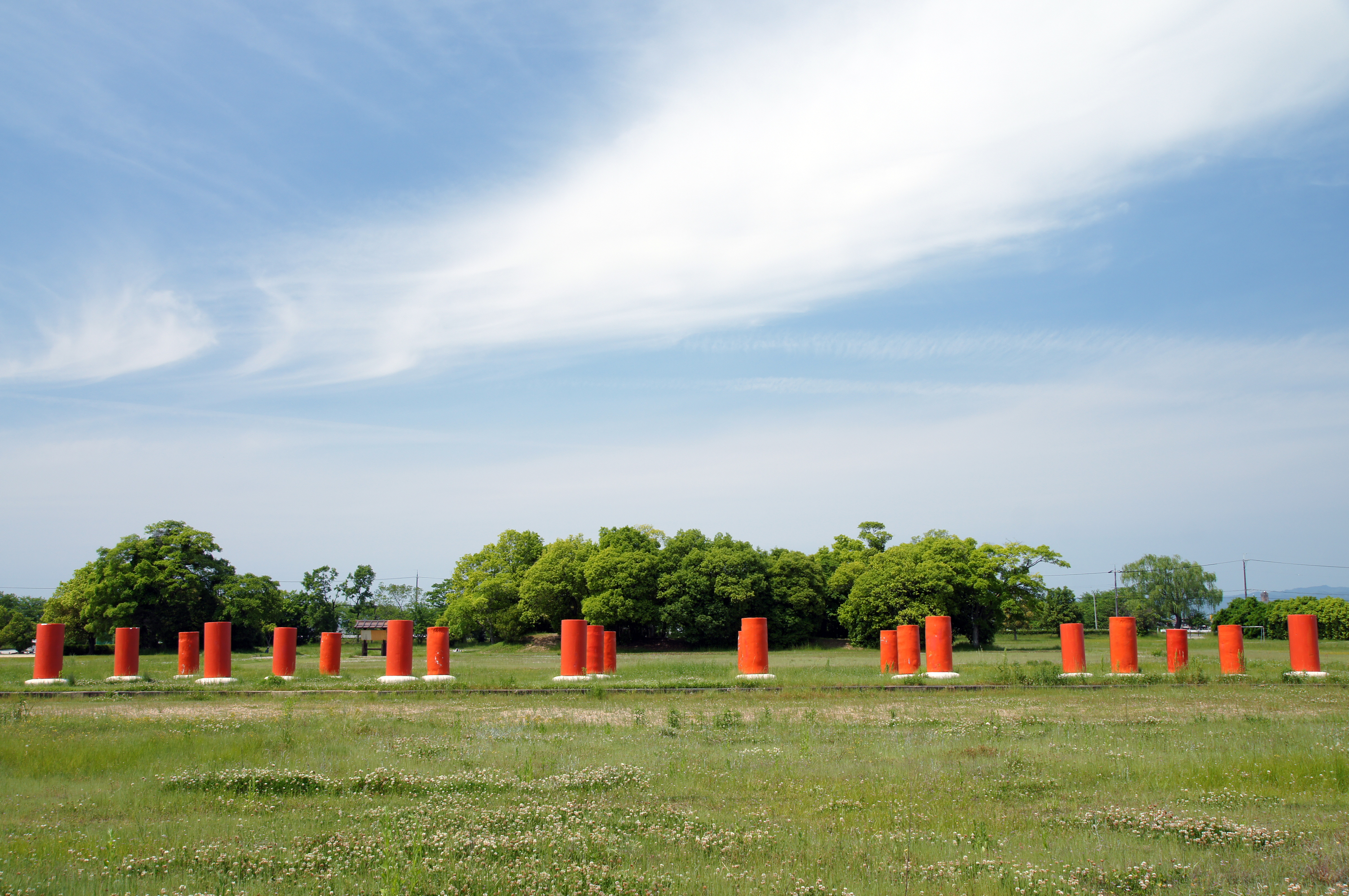
Site of the Daigokuden (大極殿)

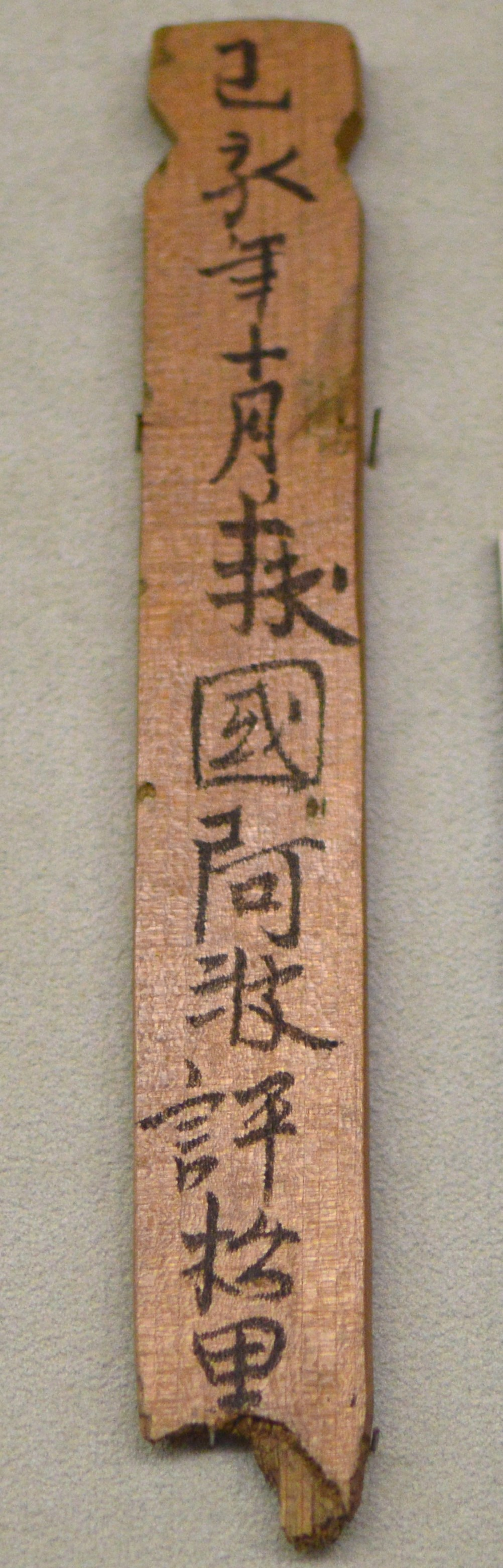
Mokkan

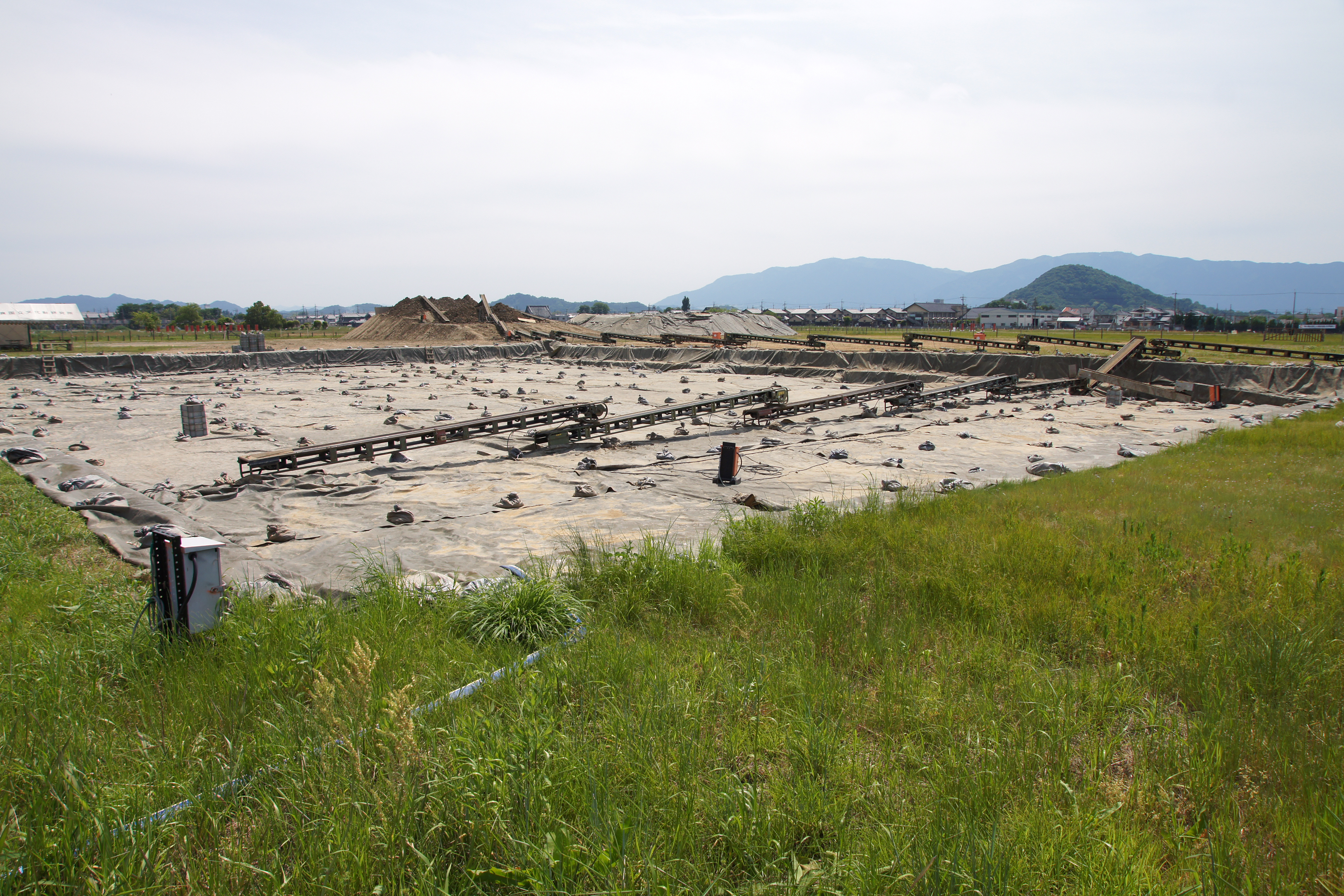
Excavation site

=== Fujiwara Palace ===
As a result of the archaeological investigation of Fujiwara Palace, traces of streets of the same grid standard were found within the palace grounds. Normally, there should be no streets for the general public to walk on within the palace, so this indicates that the site for Fujiwara-kyō was laid out on the grid-like streets throughout the entire area, and then the location and extent of the palace were determined and the streets in that area were demolished. This was also the case with the site of the temple of Yakushi-ji.

The palace was approximately one square kilometer, surrounded by a wall about 5 meters high, with 12 gates in total, three on each side. The central gate on the south side was the Suzaku Gate, which was the main entrance. The wall structure consisted of pillars spaced 2.7 meters apart, 5.5 meters high, which supported a tiled roof, and 25 cm thick rammed earthen walls filling the spaces between. During the excavation of Heijō Palace, some of the walls that had been reused from Fujiwara Palace were discovered. Important buildings were built on foundation stones, and are believed to be the first Japanese palace buildings to be covered with roof tiles in the Chinese style.

Approximately 1,200 wooden tablets have been excavated from the palace site. Some record names of government agencies such as "Ministry of Central Affairs" and "Ministry of the Imperial Household," as well as the names of high-ranking officials at the time, and contain historical materials not found in later historical documents such as the Nihon Shoki. Others are written with spells or symbols written on them to prevent or drive away evil spirits and demons that cause disasters. They appeared in the 7th century. There are eight examples from the 7th century all over Japan, six of which have been excavated from the Fujiwara Palace ruins.

The site of the palace has become a historic park. About 60% of the Fujiwara Palace ruins are designated as a Special National Historic Site.

In January 2007, the Japanese government included "Asuka-Fujiwara: Archaeological Sites of Japan's Ancient Capitals and Related Properties" on the tentative list, which is a prerequisite for World Heritage registration.

Since 2006, with the cooperation of the Asuka-Fujiwara Site Development Cooperation Committee comprising five neighboring towns (Daigo-cho, Kinomoto-cho, Nawate-cho, Bessho-cho, and Takadono-cho), the Fujiwara Palace Site Flower Garden Planting Project has been carried out to raise awareness of the Fujiwara Palace site among a wider audience. In spring, approximately 2.5 million Nanohana blossoms are planted on about 20,000 square meters. In summer, about 1 million yellow cosmos flowers are planted on approximately 7,000 square meters, along with 11 varieties of lotus on around 3,000 square meters. In autumn, about 3 million cosmos flowers are planted on approximately 30,000 square meters.

Flower Garden Planting Project

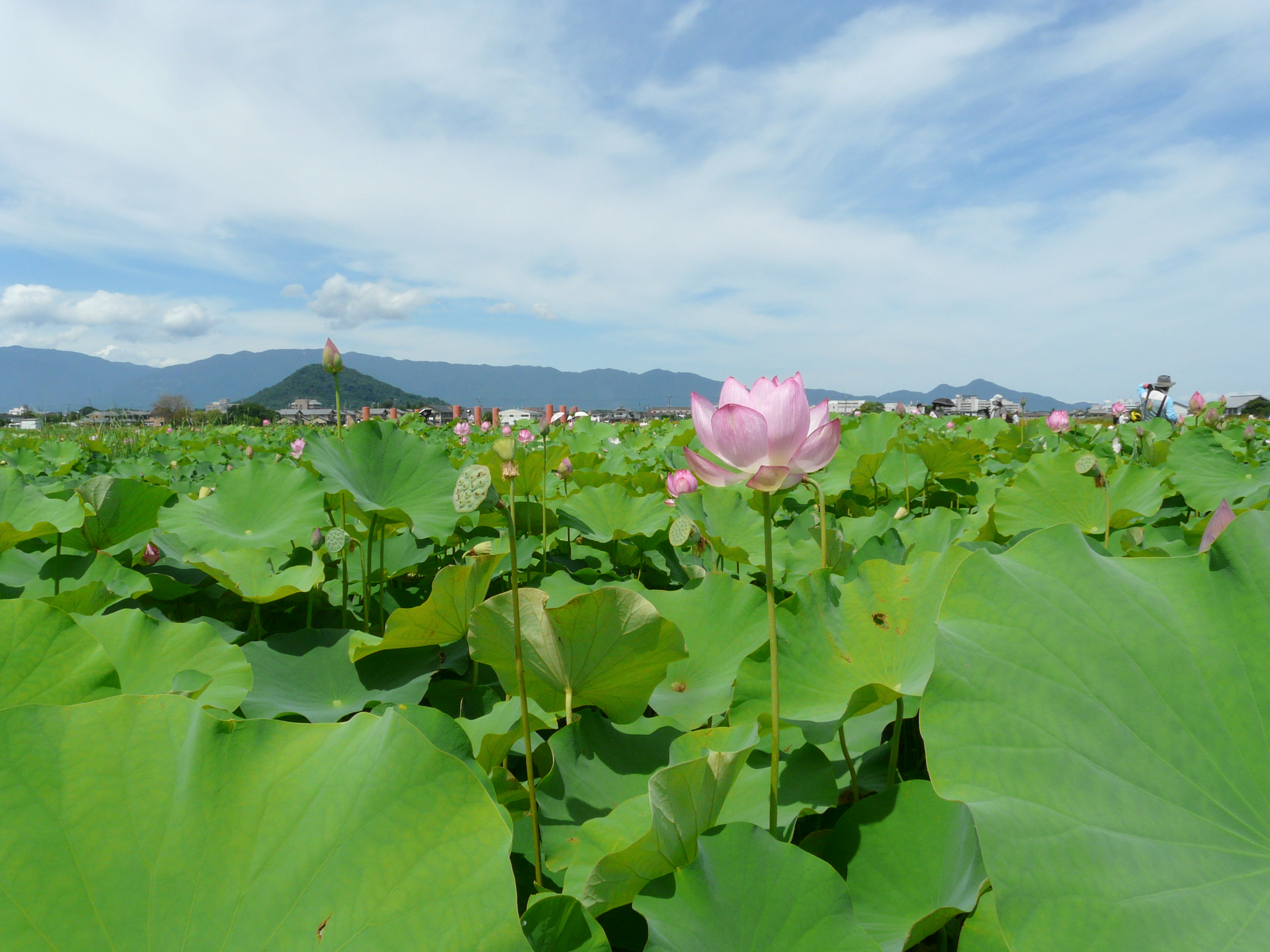
Lotus

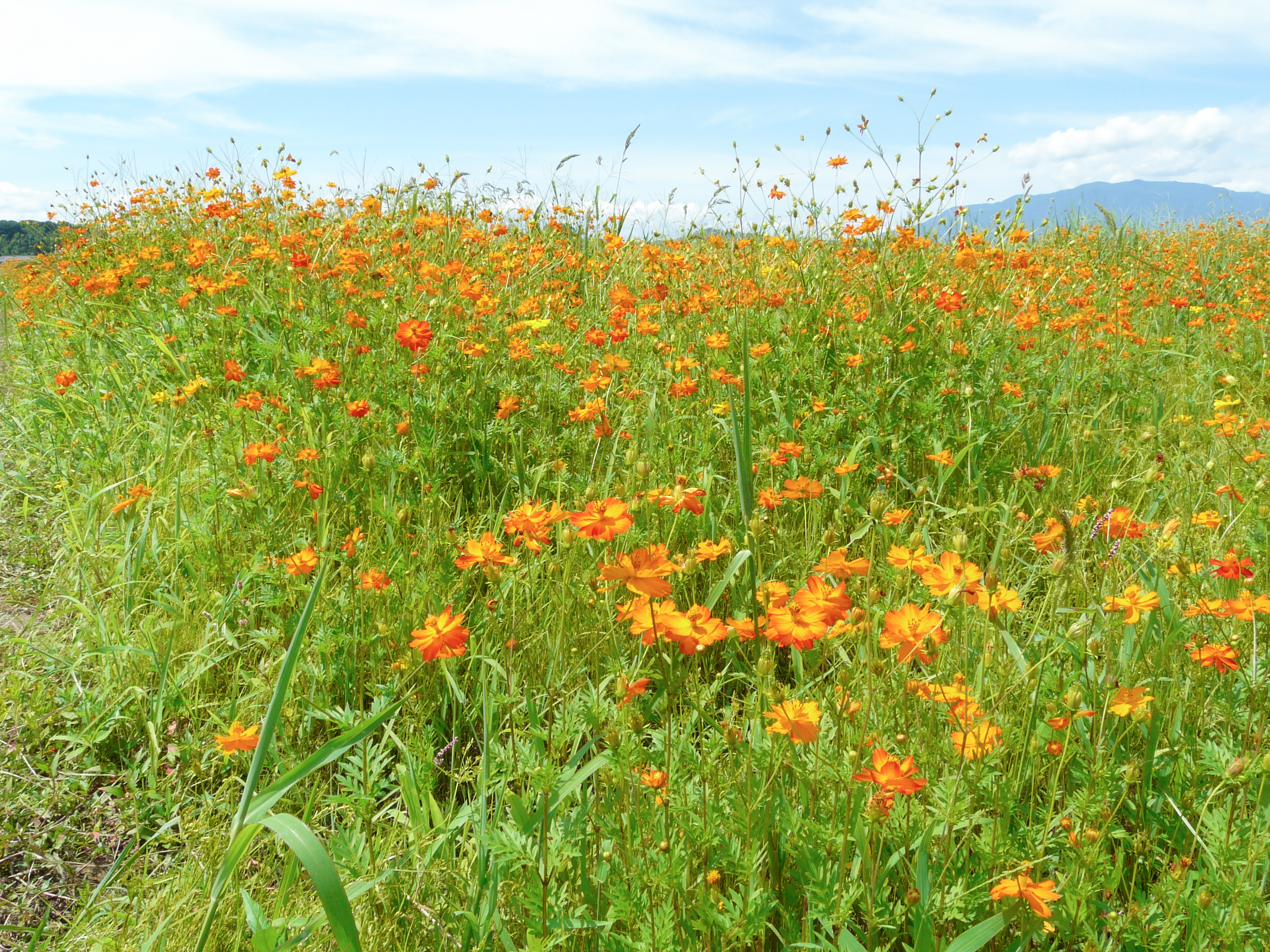
Yellow Cosmos

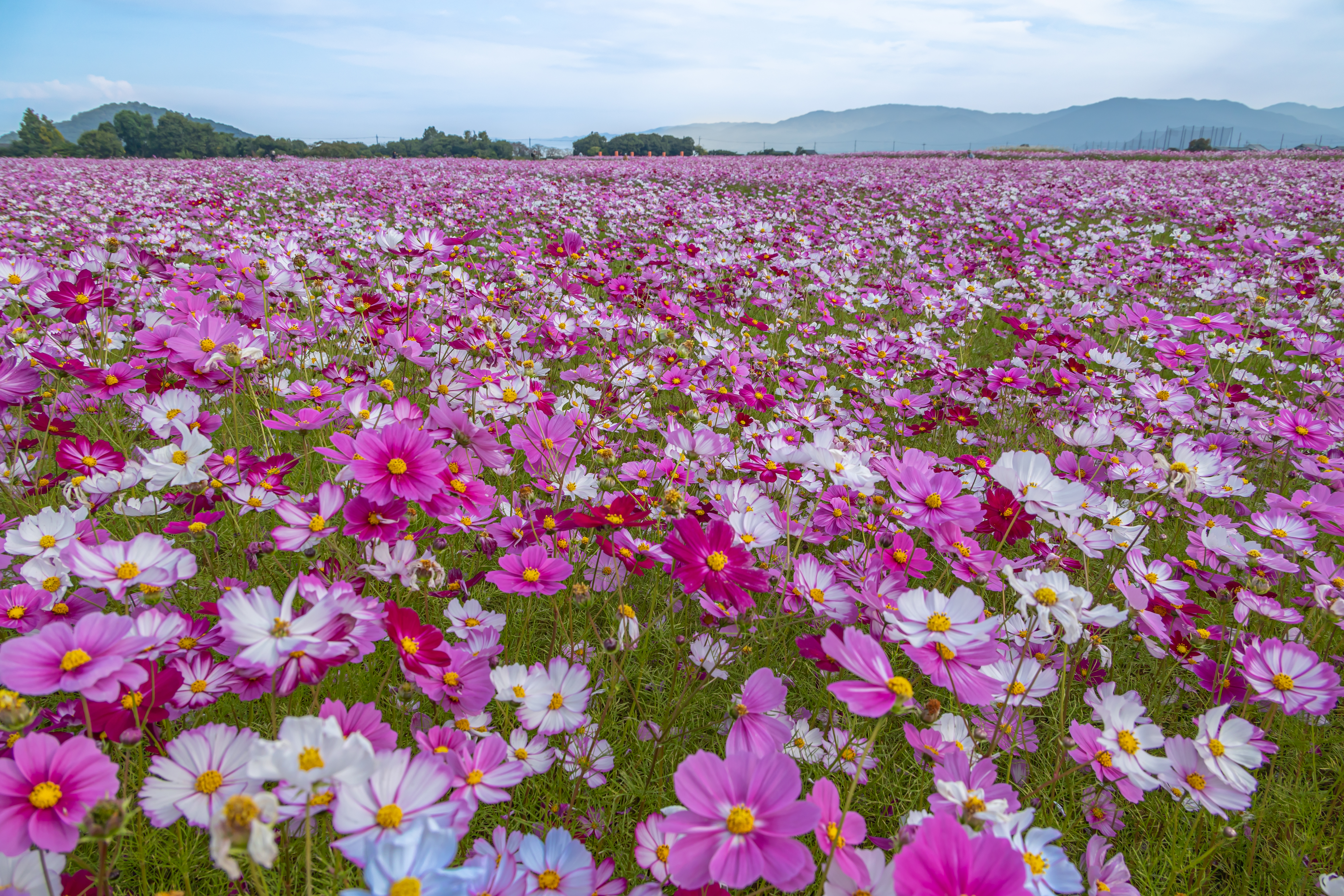
Cosmos

== See also ==
- Fujiwara clan
- List of Historic Sites of Japan (Nara)

Preceded by Asuka-kyō	Capital of Japan; 694–710	Succeeded by Heijō-kyō
