= Suzaku Avenue =

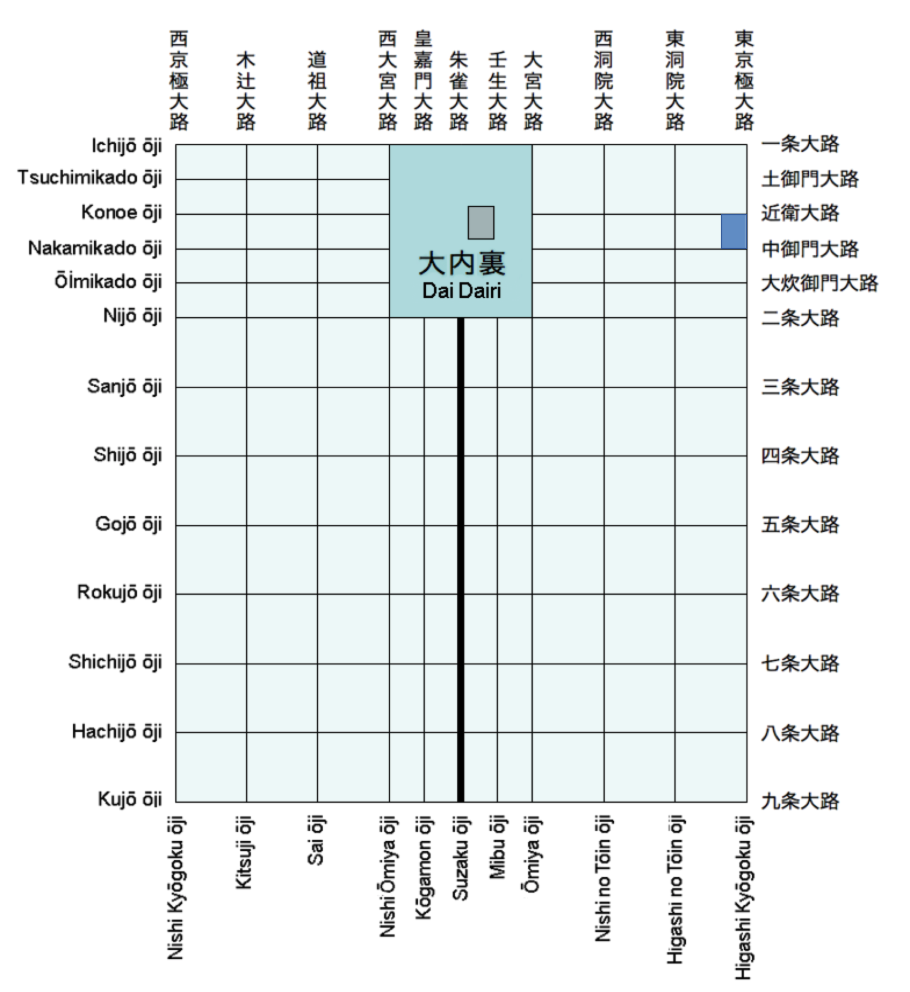
Heian-kyō layout. Suzaku Avenue shown in bold vertical line

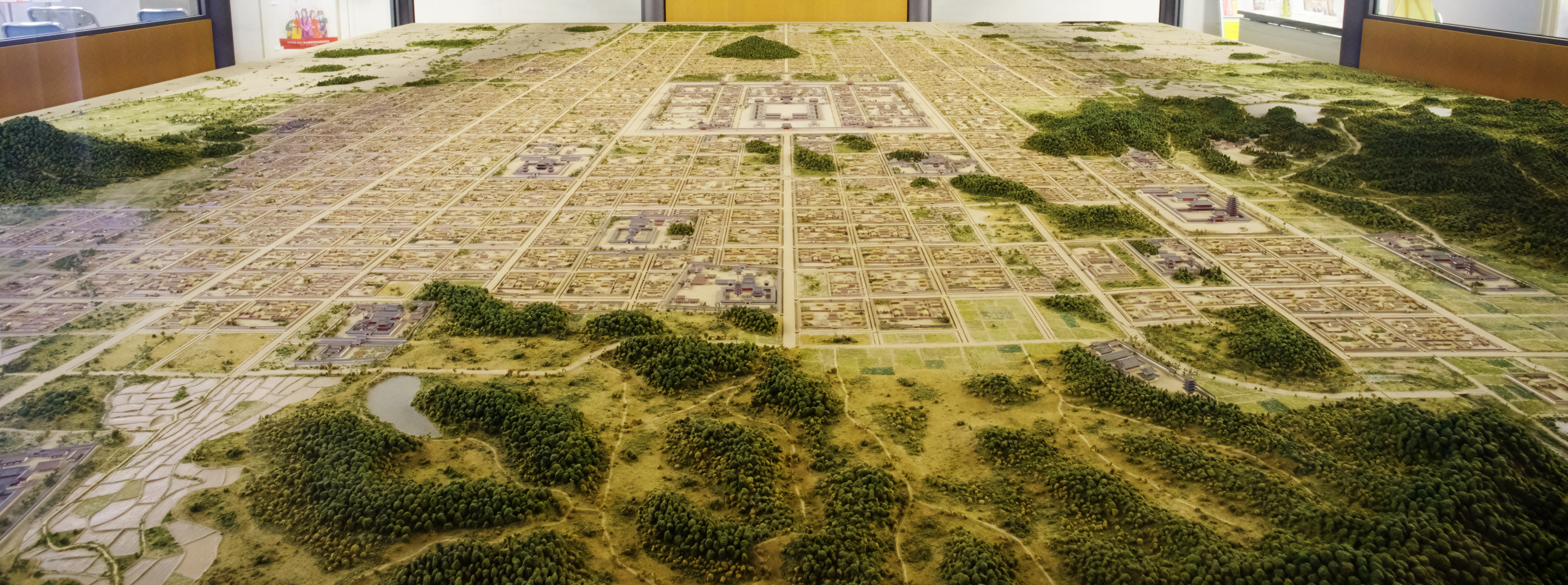
Reconstructed model of Fujiwara-kyō showing the Suzaku Avenue at center

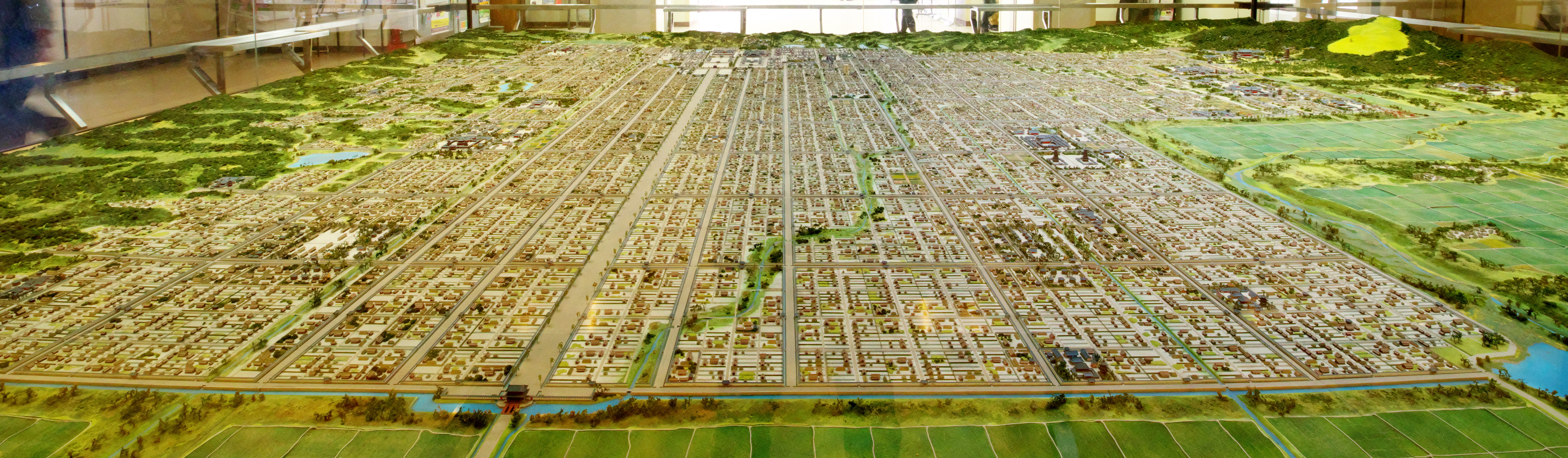
Reconstructed model of Heijō-kyō showing the Suzaku Avenue on the left

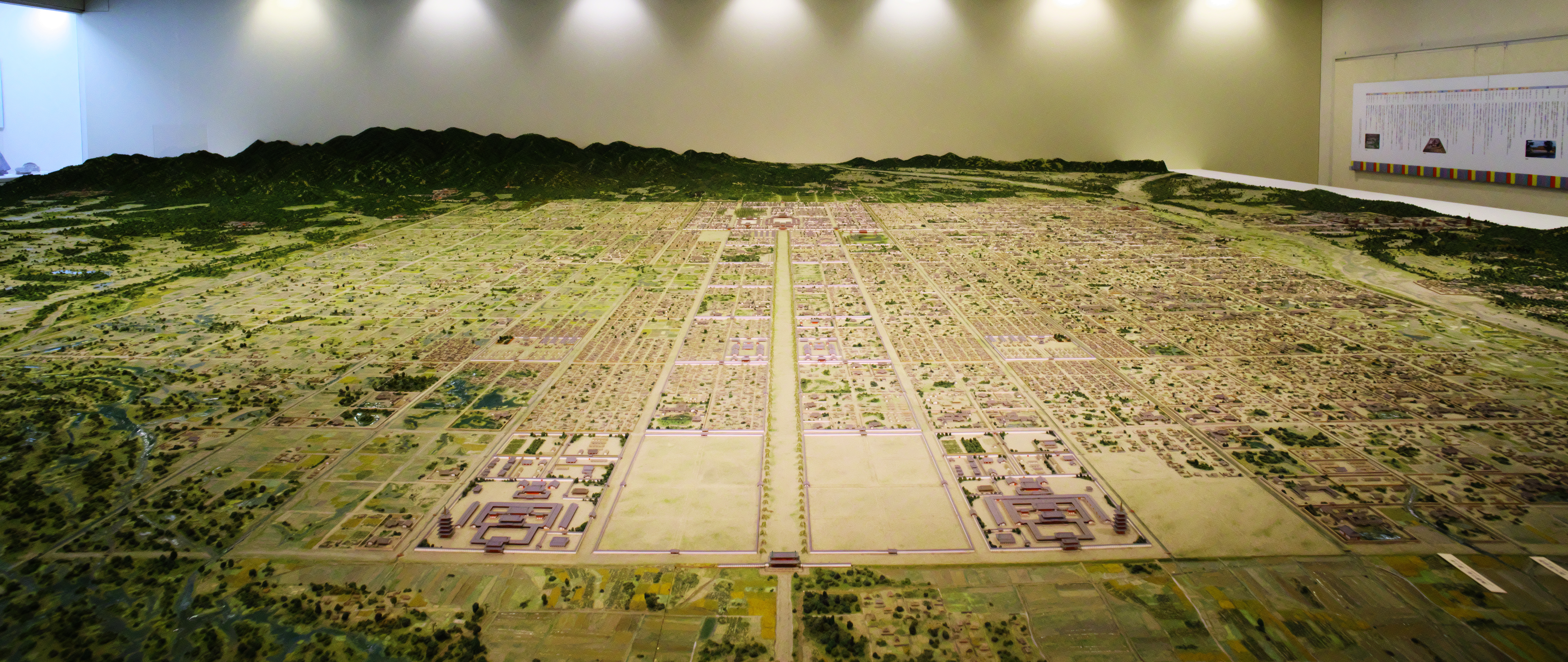
Reconstructed model of Heian-kyō showing the Suzaku Avenue and Rashōmon flanked by Tō-ji and Sai-ji

Suzaku Avenue or Suzaku Boulevard (朱雀大路, Suzaku Ōji) is the name given to the central avenue leading to the Imperial Palace from the south in Japanese capitals. Traditionally the Imperial palace complex faces south, whilst Suzaku Avenue leads directly away from the main gate. Cities were often based on a traditional Chinese grid pattern. Suzaku Avenue was typically the central road within the city grid, and as a result, the widest. Fujiwara-kyō, Heijō-kyō, and Heian-kyō each had their own Suzaku Avenue.

The word "Suzaku" refers to the Guardian God of the South, who was said to appear in the form of a bird.

== Fujiwara-kyō ==
Fujiwara-kyō's Suzaku-oji ran north and south from Fujiwara Palace, dividing the city into east and west halves. The Fujiwara-kyō Suzaku-oji was not as wide as later Heijō-kyō and Heian-kyō, which were more than 70 meters wide, but was instead very narrow at just over 24 meters wide (between the centers of the gutters). There is a theory that the Suzaku-oji and Rajōmon on the south side of the Asuka River were not developed in the capital due to lack of archaeological evidence and the presence of a number of large Buddhist temples in that area.

== Heijō-kyō ==
The Heijō-kyō Suzaku-ōji (平城京朱雀大路跡) was located between Nijō-ōji Minami and Sanjō-ōji in modern Nara city. In 1984, the 220-meter stretch from the Heijō-kyō ruins to Ōmiya-dōri to the south was designated as a National Historic Site. The avenue, which stretches 3.7 kilometer from north to south, from the Rajōmon Gate, the main entrance to Heijō-kyō in the south, to the Suzakumon Gate, the main gate on the south side of the palace complex, was designed not only to function as a road, but also to accommodate the passage of foreign envoys, and its size and the surrounding streetscape were designed to be spectacular.

Excavations conducted since 1974 have clarified the route of the street, and it has been revealed that the width is about 74 meters between the centers of the east-and-west side gutters, and that the distance between the east and west embankments in Sanjō is about 85 meters. The remains of a previous 23 meter wide road were also discovered below the Nara period road. In 2010, a portion of the Heijō-kyō Suzaku-ōji, measuring 70 meters wide and 210 meters long, was restored from the south side of Suzakumon Gate.

== Heian-kyō ==
In Heian-kyō, present-day Kyoto, the Rajōmon (also Raseimon) was at the southern end of Suzaku Avenue, flanked on the east by the temple of Tō-ji, and on the west by the temple of Sai-ji, whilst at the northern end there was the main gate (Suzakumon) of Heian Palace. Of these, only Tō-ji remains.

Over time, Suzaku Avenue stopped being the central street due to the gradual abandonment of the west of the city. Eventually the road served as the western boundary of the town, up until the Meiji period. Presently it is still a major street, called Senbon Street or Senbon Avenue (千本通, Senbon Dōri), and once served as a route for the city's tramline.
