= Prince Takamuku =

Japanese prince, and first husband of Empress Kōgyoku

Prince Takamuku 高向王
- Spouse: Princess Takara (later Empress Kōgyoku/Saimei)
- Issue: Prince Kara
- House: Imperial house of Japan
- Father: Prince Tame

Prince Takamuku (高向王; Takamuku no Ōkimi) was the first husband of Princess Takara (later Empress Kōgyoku/Saimei), and a son of Prince Tame, making him a grandson of Emperor Yōmei. He had one son, Prince Kara (also known as Prince Aya), from his marriage with Princess Takara.

== Life ==
Prince Takamuku was born as the son of Prince Tame, a son of Emperor Yōmei and his concubine Soga no Ishikina.

It is believed to have been bought up by a man named Takamuku no Kunioshi.

He married Princess Takara and they had one child together, named Prince Kara (also known as Prince Aya). However, the couple separated for unknown reasons, sometime before Princess Takara's second husband, Prince Tamura, succeeded to the throne as Emperor Jomei.

Prince Takamuku was not recorded in most imperial geologies, but is mentioned in the Nihon Shoki. However, much of his life is not recorded.

== Emperor Tenmu theory ==
Many people, such as historian Yamato Iwao, have theorised that Prince Ōama (later Emperor Tenmu), is the son of Prince Takamuku, as the Prince Kara mentioned as the son of Takamuku and Empress Kōgyoku. The theory is based of medieval writings (such as the Ichidai Yoki) that state Prince Ōama is actually older than Prince Nakano Ōe (later Emperor Tenji). Historian Yamato Iwao has said that if this is true, then there is a possibility that Prince Ōama may be Prince Kara. Author Sasa Katsuki also put forward the theory that Tenmu was older than Tenji in 1974, but stated Tenmu may have been of Silla origin, with historian Yasuko Kobayashi soon after proposing the theory that Tenmu was the son of Kōgyoku and Takamuku. However this has been heavily contested by historians of the Nihon Shoki, as there is little to no evidence outside of these medieval writings.
