= Yamato Hime no Ōkimi =

Yamato Hime no Ōkimi 倭姫王

Empress consort of Japan
- Tenure: 661–671
- Born: Unknown; Japan
- Died: Unknown; Japan
- Burial: Ōtsu City, Shiga Prefecture, Japan
- House: Imperial House of Japan
- Father: Prince Furuhito-no-Ōe

Yamato Hime no Ōkimi (倭姫王) was a poet and Empress of Japan, as the wife of her paternal uncle Emperor Tenji. This marriage produced no children. She was a granddaughter of Emperor Jomei (舒明天皇) and Soga no Hote-no-iratsume (蘇我法提郎女), through their son Prince Furuhito-no-Ōe (古人大兄皇子).

Her poetry is collected in the Man'yōshū (万葉集), the oldest existing collection of Japanese poetry believed to have been collected by Ōtomo no Yakamochi (大伴 家持). After the death of her husband in 671, she wrote a song of mourning about him.

She is believed to have served as a ruler in the interregnum between her husband's death and the ascension of the next emperor.

== Notes ==
Japanese royalty
Preceded by Princess Hashihito	Empress consort of Japan; 661–671	Succeeded by Princess Unonosarara
