= Prince Karu =

Prince Karu (軽皇子) may refer to either of the following Japanese emperors:

- Emperor Kōtoku (645–654), 36th emperor
- Emperor Monmu (697–707), 42nd emperor
