= Kengoshizuka Kofun =

Kofun period octagonal-shaped burial mound in Japan

- 牽牛子塚古墳 (Japanese)
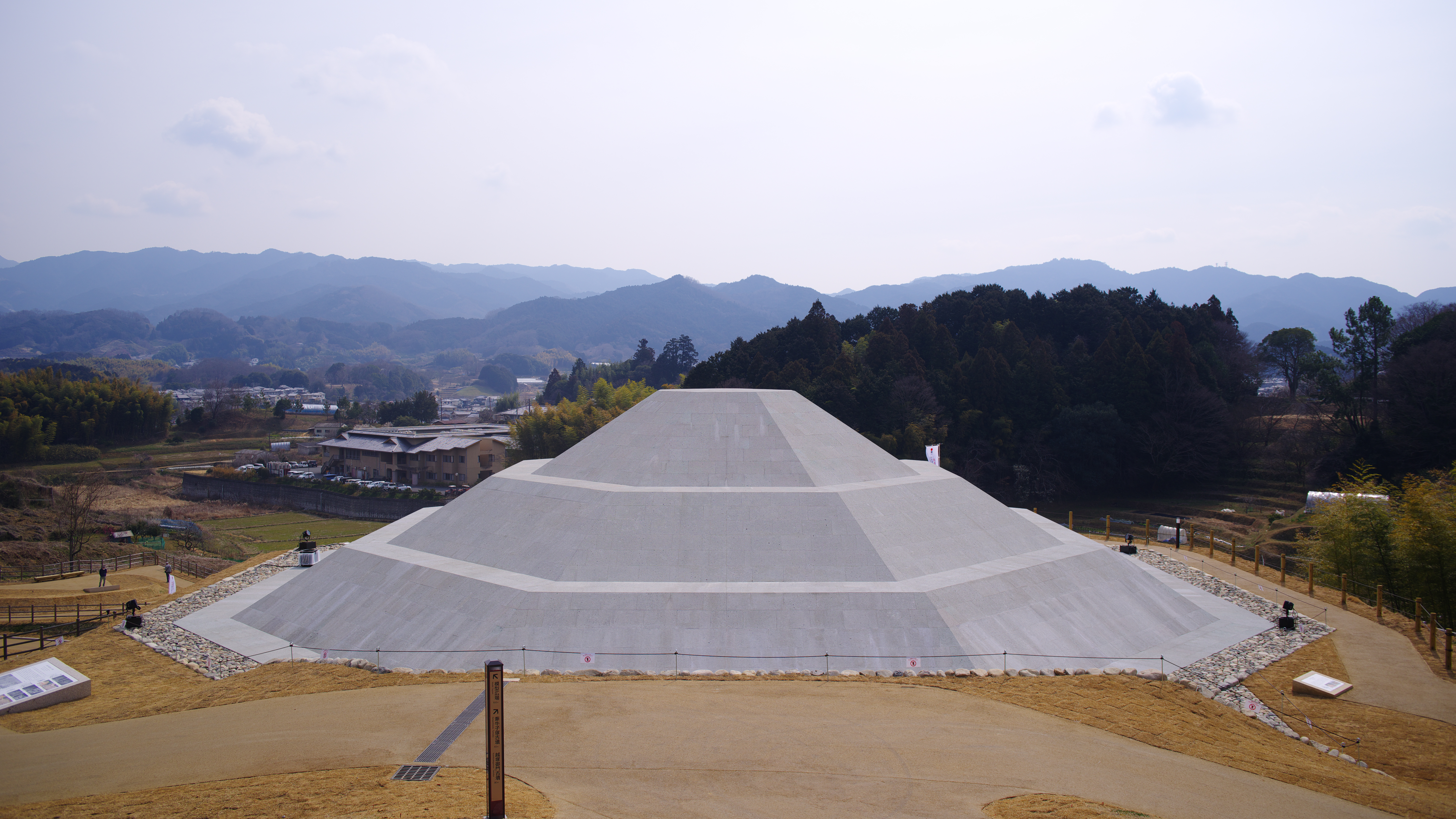
- Kengoshizuka Kofun in 2022

- Kengoshizuka Kofun Kengoshizuka Kofun (Japan)
- Interactive map of Kengoshizuka Kofun
- 34°27′58.7″N 135°47′32.29″E
- Type: Kofun
- Periods: Kofun period
- Location: Asuka, Nara, Japan
- Region: Kansai region

History
- Built: c.7th century

Site notes
- Public access: Yes (no facilities)

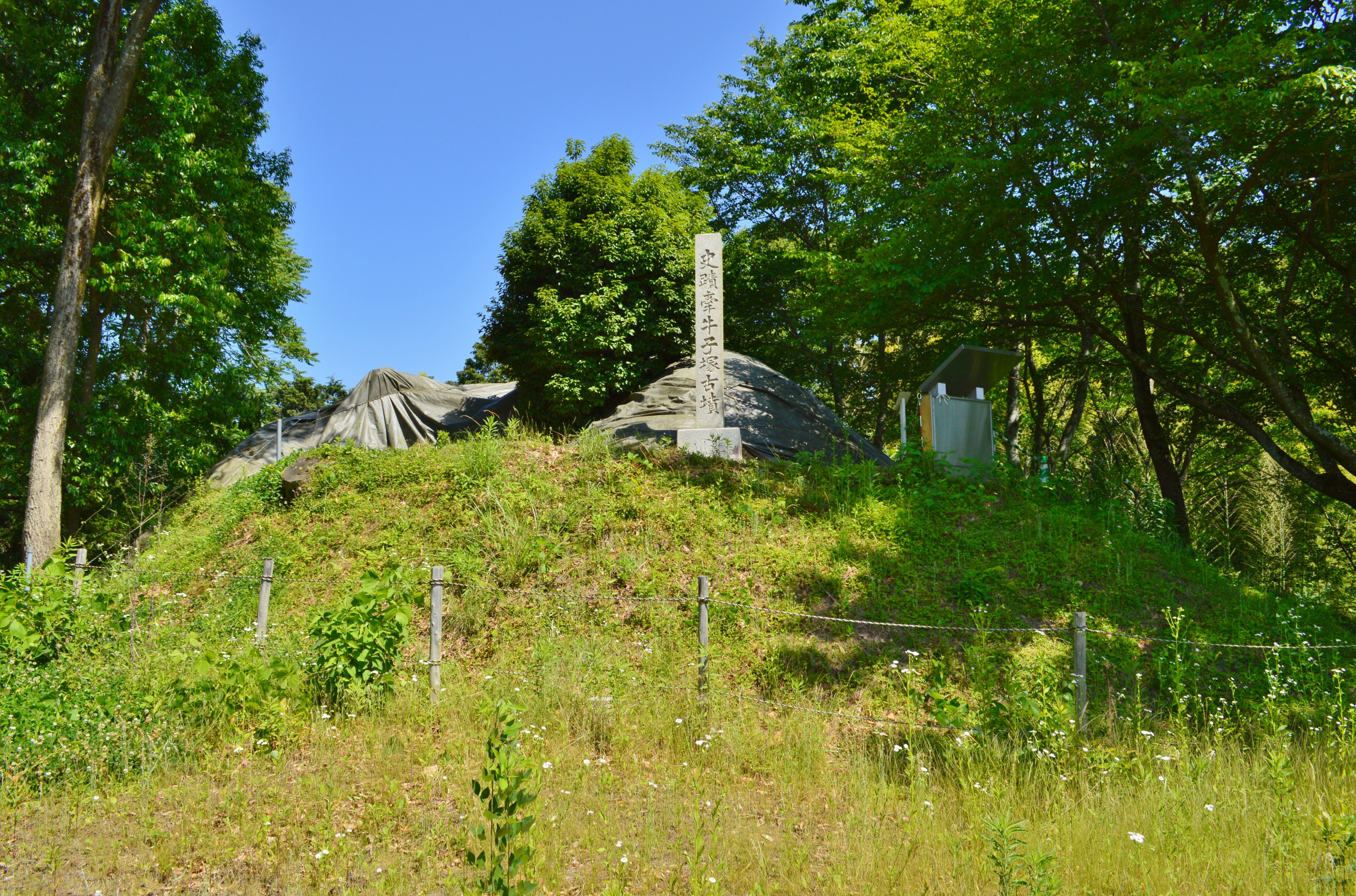
Kengoshizuka Kofun before reconstruction

Kengoshizuka Kofun (牽牛子塚古墳) is a Kofun period burial mound, located in the Koshi neighborhood of the village of Asuka, Nara in the Kansai region of Japan. The tumulus was designated a National Historic Site of Japan in 1923, with the area under protection expanded in 2014 and again in 2015, together with the nearby Koshitsukagomon Kofun (越塚御門古墳墳). It is most likely the tomb for Empress Saimei (also known as Empress Kōgyoku) the 35th and 37th monarch of Japan, and her daughter, Princess Hashihito. The tumulus is also called the "Asagao Kofun" from an alternative reading of the kanji in its name.

== Overview ==
The Kengoshizuka Kofun is located on the top of a branch ridge that runs south from an east-west ridge near the border between Asuka Village and Kashihara City at an elevation of 126.3 meters. It is located about 500 meters west of the Iwayayama Kofun, also a National Historic Site. Long thought to have been an enpun (円墳)-style circular tumulus, it was excavated from 1977-1978 and was found to be a hakkaku-fun (八角墳)-style octagonal tumulus built in three tiers using tamped earth with an original height of 4.5 meters.The base of the mound had been carved into an octagonal shape with opposite sides measuring about 22 meters. Stone paving remains surrounding the mound in an octagonal shape were found around the outside, and stone paving was found on three sides of the northwest base. One side (about 9 meters) remained almost intact, and the width was about 1 meter, with three rows of cut stone blocks laid out without gaps. The stone paving remains themselves are bent at an angle of about 135 degrees in the middle to form a regular octagon. When viewed from above, they have a common center and are made up of three tiers of mounds and three rows of flat stone paving, which are similar octagons of different sizes. The outside of the stone paving is covered with gravel, and including this, the entire area is estimated to be about 32 meters in size.

In addition, hundreds of cut stones and fragments of white tuff cut into triangular prisms have been excavated. Researchers believe that these cut stones were piled up in pyramids to decorate the slope of the mound, and they estimate that the total number of pieces is about 7,200. The first tier of the mound has a side length of 12.2 meters and a diagonal length of about 33 meters, while the second tier has a side length of about 7 meters, a diagonal length of about 18.5 meters, and a height of 4 meters.

The burial facility is a horizontal-entrance stone burial chamber opening to the south, which was carved out of a single tuff breccia monolith weighing about 80 tons. The huge stone is thought to have been transported from the western foot of Mount Nijō, about 15 kilometers away. The burial chamber is 5 meters wide, 3.5 meters deep, and 2.5 meters high, and divided into two spaces, east and west, by a partition wall 44.7 centimeters wide and 152.5 centimeters long in the center. The dimensions of the hollowed-out part are 1.41 meters wide, 1.01 meters high, and 0.63 meters long. They also found three huge dacite cut stones, each of which was a rectangular parallelepiped (2.7 meters long, 1.2 meters wide, 0.7 meters thick) that had been carefully carved to surround the outside of the megalith, and confirmed that originally there were 16 stones lined up in an orderly fashion.

Each of the two chambers, are about two meters long, with double plasterwork on the walls. Both chambers have rounded ceilings, and are about 1.3 meters high. The left chamber is 2.1 meters long and 1.14 meters wide, while the right chamber is 2.08 meters long and 1.16 meters wide. On the floor of each chamber is a base for the sarcophagus, about 1.95 meters long, 0.78 meters wide, and 0.08 meters high, carved out of the ground. The blocking stone consists of an inner door and an outer door. The inner door is made of tuff and is about 1.12 meters high, 0.62 meters thick, and 1.47 meters wide, while the outer door is made of andesite and is about 2.4 meters high, 0.63 meters thick, and 2.69 meters wide. In addition, square holes have been confirmed in the four corners of the inner door, which suggests that it was fitted with door ornaments. Fragments of a dry lacquer coffin made from multiple layers of hemp cloth pasted with lacquer, have been found. This type of coffin found in a very small number of late Kofun period tombs, and is thought to have been used for the funerals of nobles as it was considered the highest quality of the time. Grave goods include tortoise-shell cloisonné fittings, and glass beads, as well as iron rivets, and iron nails. Human molar teeth from a young woman have also been found. These artifacts were collectively designated as a National Important Cultural Property in 1953. The designated items are now kept at the Nara Prefectural Kashihara Archaeological Institute Museum.

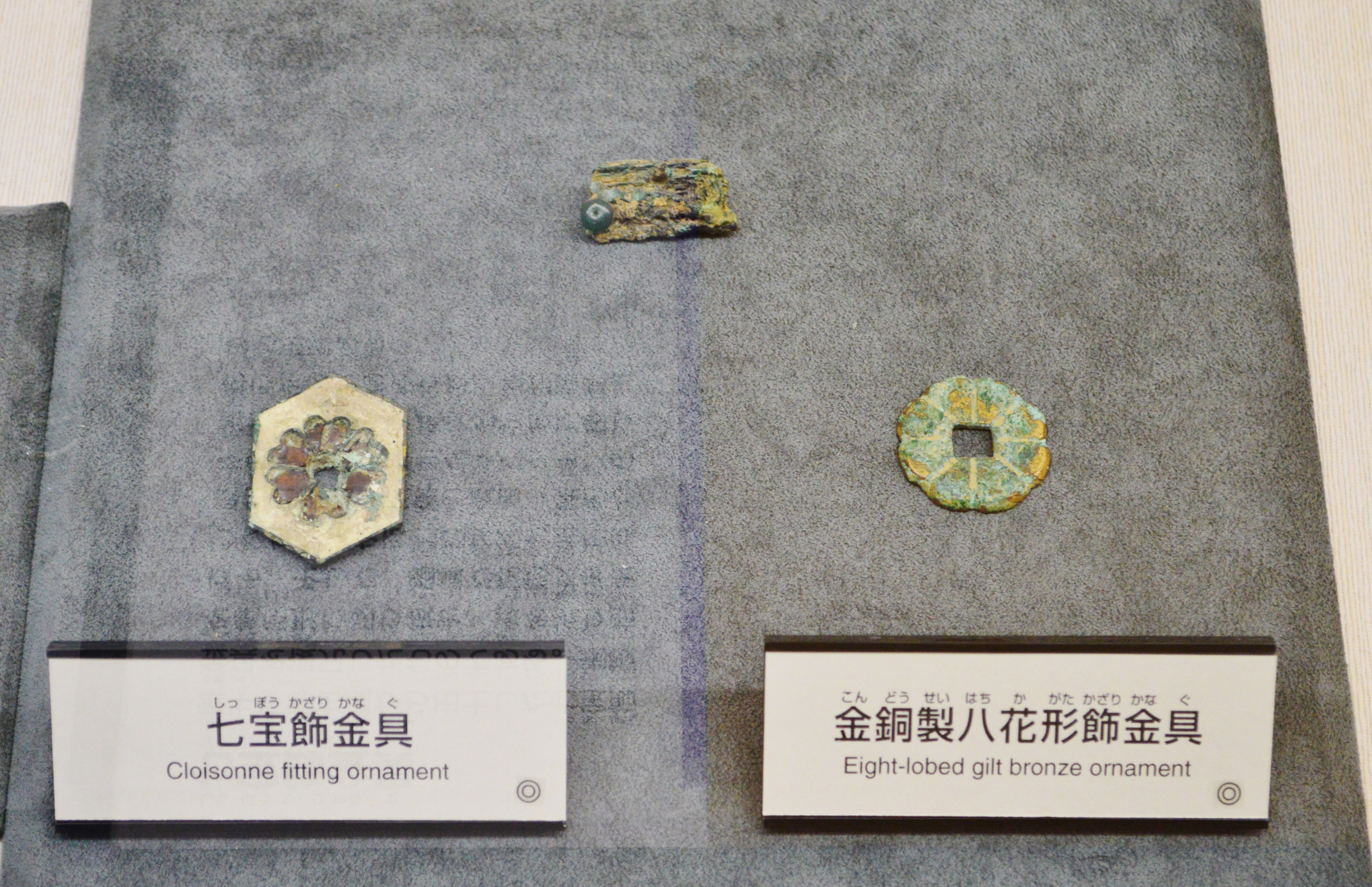
Cloisonne ornaments and gilt bronze eight-flower ornaments (ICP)
Displayed at the Nara Prefectural Kashihara Archaeological Institute Museum.

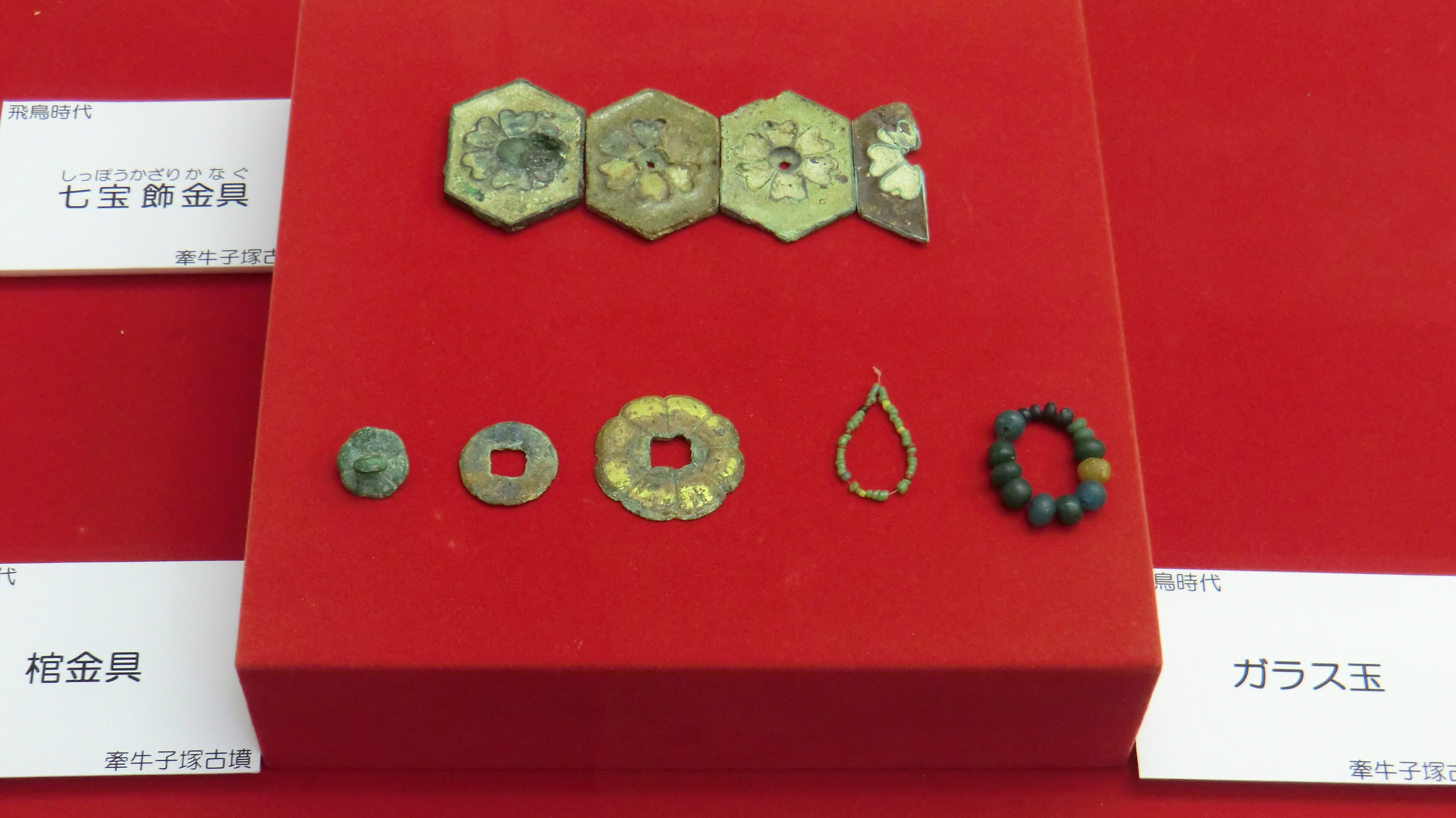
Cloisonne ornaments, coffin fittings, glass beads
Displayed at the Asuka Village Buried Cultural Property Exhibition Room

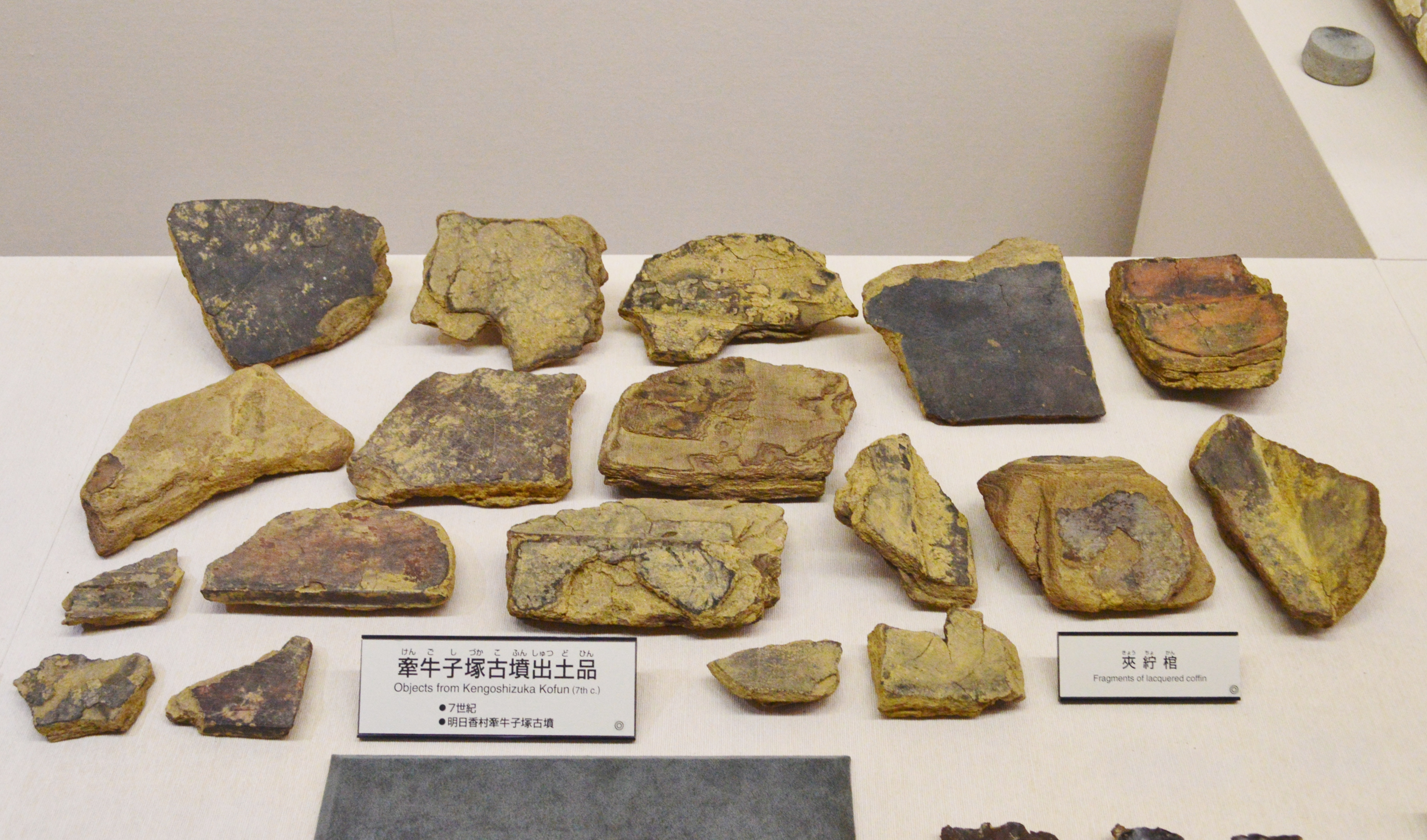
Remnants of a dry lacquer coffin (ICP)
Displayed at the Nara Prefectural Kashihara Archaeological Institute Museum

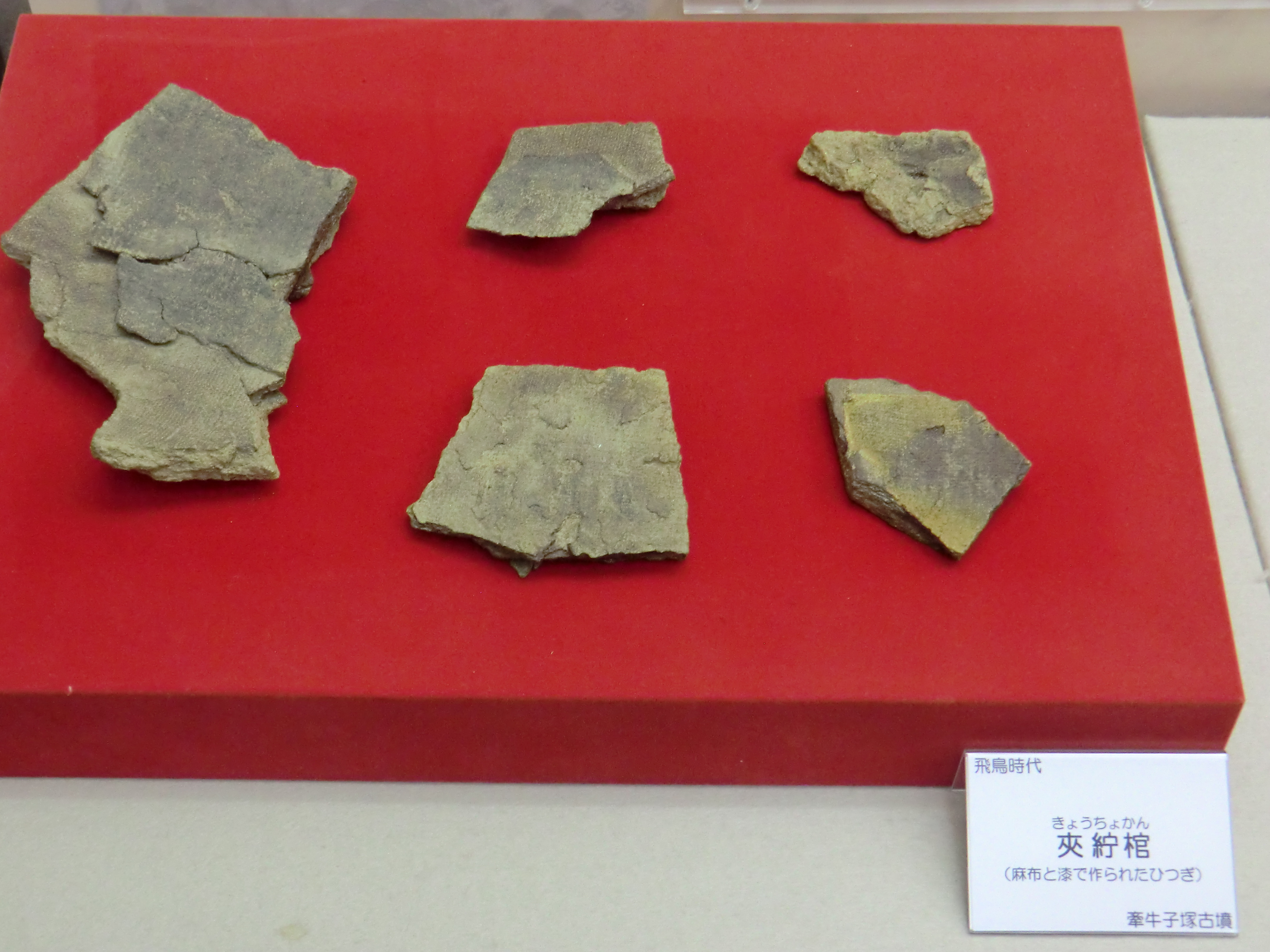
Remnants of a dry lacquer coffin (ICP)
Displayed at the Asuka Village Buried Cultural Property Exhibition Room

The construction date of the tumulus is estimated to be the late 7th century based on these remains and the construction techniques and materials. This date, along with the fact that octagonal kofun were exclusively reserved for imperial burials, the location, and the unusual double burial all match with the description of the joint burial of Empress Saimei and Princess Hashihito in the Nihon Shoki. The Kengoshizuka Kofun is also known in local folklore as the tomb of Empress Saimei and Princess Hashihito. On the other hand, in the early Meiji period, the Imperial Household Agency arbitrarily designated the Kurumaki Kenno Kofun, located 2.5 kilometers southwest of this tomb in the town of Takatori, as the tomb of Empress Saimei. While the Imperial Household Agency Archives and Mausolea Department acknowledges that there is a theory that Kengyokozuka Kofun is a likely candidate for the tomb of Empress Saimei, it has no intention of altering its designations. it was reconstructed and opened to the public on May 6, 2022.

The tumulus has been restored to what archaeologists believe to have been its original appearance. The tumulus is about 700 meters west of Asuka Station on the Kintetsu Railway Yoshino Line.

== Koshitsukagomon Kofun ==
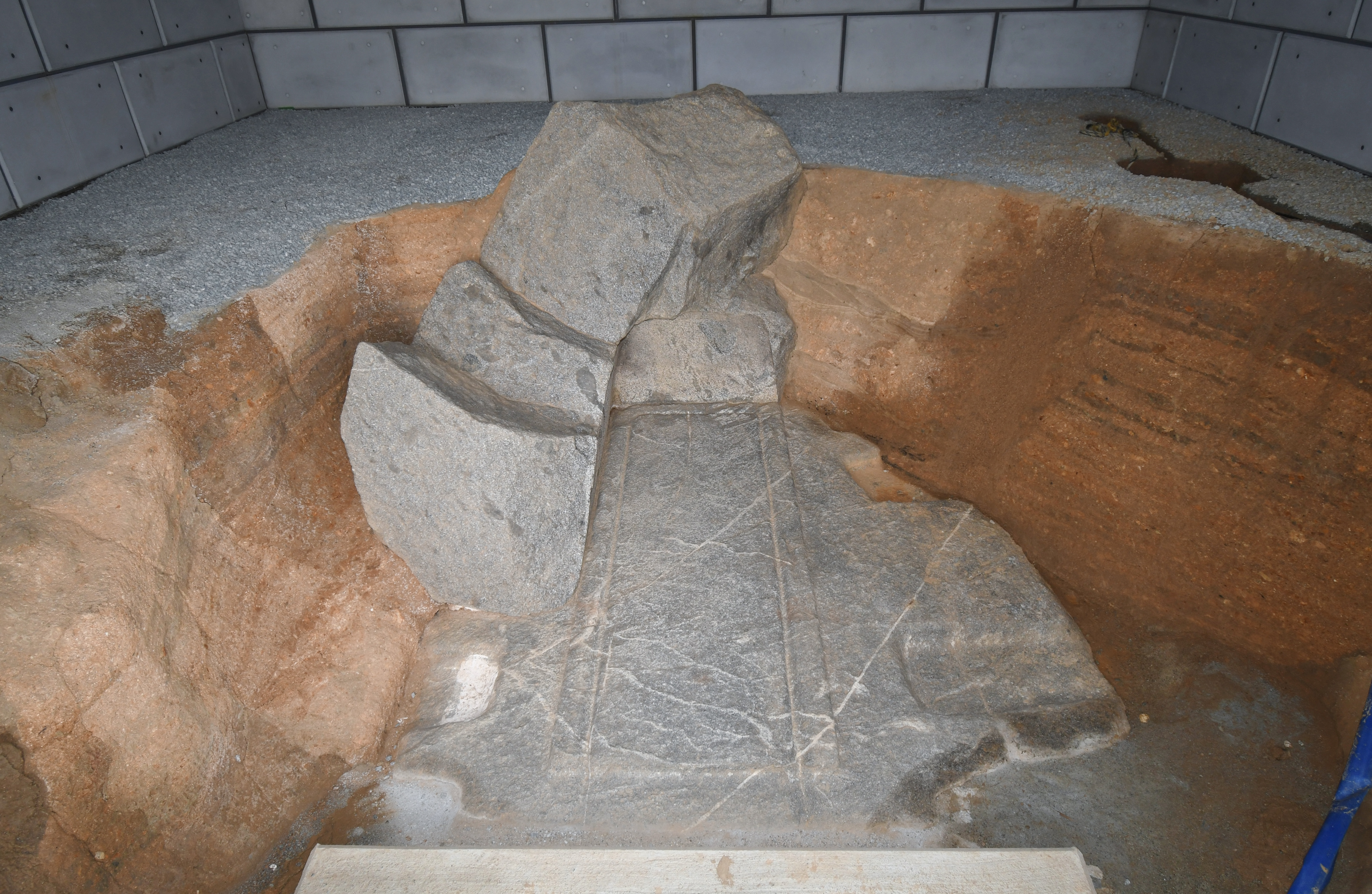
Koshitsukagomon Kofun burial chamber fragments

The academic position regarding the location of Empress Saimei's tomb was further strengthened in 2010 with the excavation of the Koshitsukagomon Kofun (越塚御門古墳墳), a baizuka auxiliary tumulus adjacent to the Kengyokozuka Kofun. In October 2010, when the site of the Kengoshizuka Kofun was being backfilled, fragments of a stone burial chamber, were discovered. The location vis-a-vis the Kengyokozuka Kofun corresponded to where the Nihon Shoki described the location of the grave of Empress Saimei's granddaughter, Princess Ōta.

== See also ==
- List of Historic Sites of Japan (Nara)
- Japanese imperial tombs
