= Iwayayama Kofun =

Kofun period burial mound in Japan

- 岩屋山古墳 (Japanese)
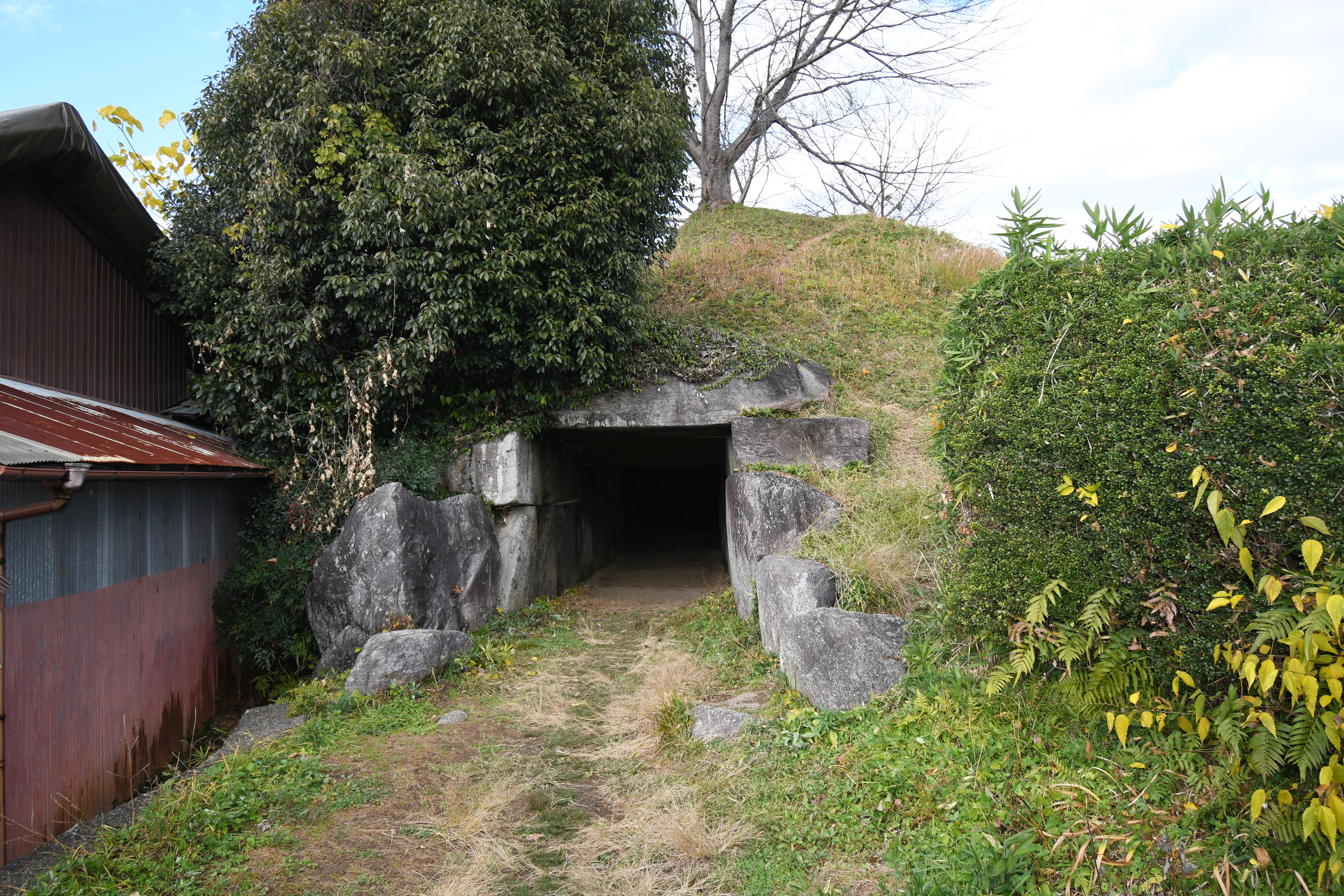
- Iwayayama Kofun

- Iwayayama Kofun Iwayayama Kofun (Japan)
- Interactive map of Iwayayama Kofun
- 34°27′56.6″N 135°47′51.5″E
- Type: Kofun
- Periods: Kofun period
- Location: Asuka, Nara, Japan
- Region: Kansai region

History
- Built: c.7th century

Site notes
- Public access: Yes (no facilities)

Iwayayama Kofun (岩屋山古墳) is a Kofun period burial mound, located in the Koshi neighborhood of the village of Asuka, Nara in the Kansai region of Japan. The tumulus was designated a National Historic Site of Japan in 2008.

== Overview ==
The Iwayayama Kofun has been widely known since ancient times because of the opening of the horizontal-entry stone burial chamber, which was robbed in antiquity. It was long thought to be a square hōfun (方墳)-style tumulus with 45-meter sides, but modern archaeological techniques indicate that it was mostly likely originally square in the lower section, but with an octagonal upper section. In 1978, the western side of the mound, which had been previously eroded, collapsed due to flooding, so environmental improvement work was carried out and excavations could be carried out. This revealed that it was originally built in two stages with a sides of about 45 meters in length and a height of 12 meters. The mound was also carefully tamped.

The burial chamber is a double-sided horizontal-entry type stone chamber made entirely of granite, with elaborate cut stone processing applied to the inside. The walls of the burial chamber are stacked in two layers, with one cut stone on the top and one on the bottom, and two cut stones on the top and three on the bottom for the side walls, with the upper layer of each wall tilting inward. The ceiling stone is made of a large monolith. The side walls of the passage are single-tiered in the back half, but double-tiered in the front half. The chamber is 4.9 meters long, 2.7 meters wide, and 3 meters high, while the passage is 12 meters long and 1.9 meters wide. In the area from Nara Prefecture to southern Osaka Prefecture, there are several kofun that have the same layout and proportions, notably the burial chamber of the Eifuku-ji Kita Kofun in Osaka Prefecture (said to be the tomb of Prince Shōtoku). It burial was first reported to the academic community by the Englishman William Gowland in 1897. As the burial chamber has been open for centuries, no grave goods have been found.

It has been estimated that the construction period of Iwayayama Kofun was from around the middle of the 7th century to the third quarter of the 7th century, based on the type of house-shaped sarcophagi, and the chronology of Sue ware pottery excavated from similar tombs, and it has been suggested that this may have been the tomb of Empress Saimei, based on its unusual style, which was typically only used for royal tombs during this period. On the other hand, based on the assumption that the Eifuku-ji Kita Kofun is indeed the tomb of Prince Shotoku, who died in 621 or 622 AD, this would move the construction of this tumulus to the first quarter of the 7th century, which would rule out the possibility that it was the tomb of Empress Saimei.

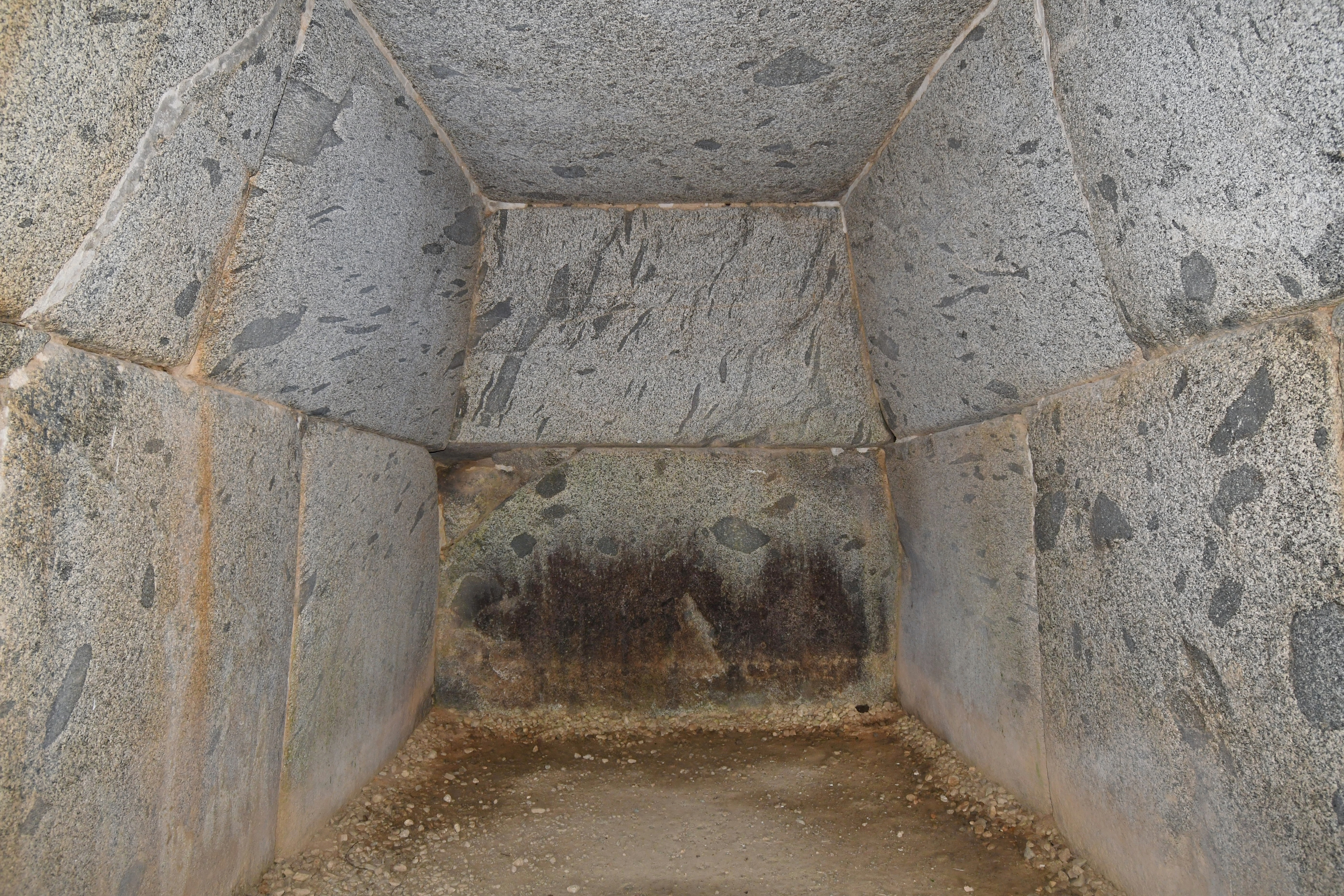
Burial chamber（interior）

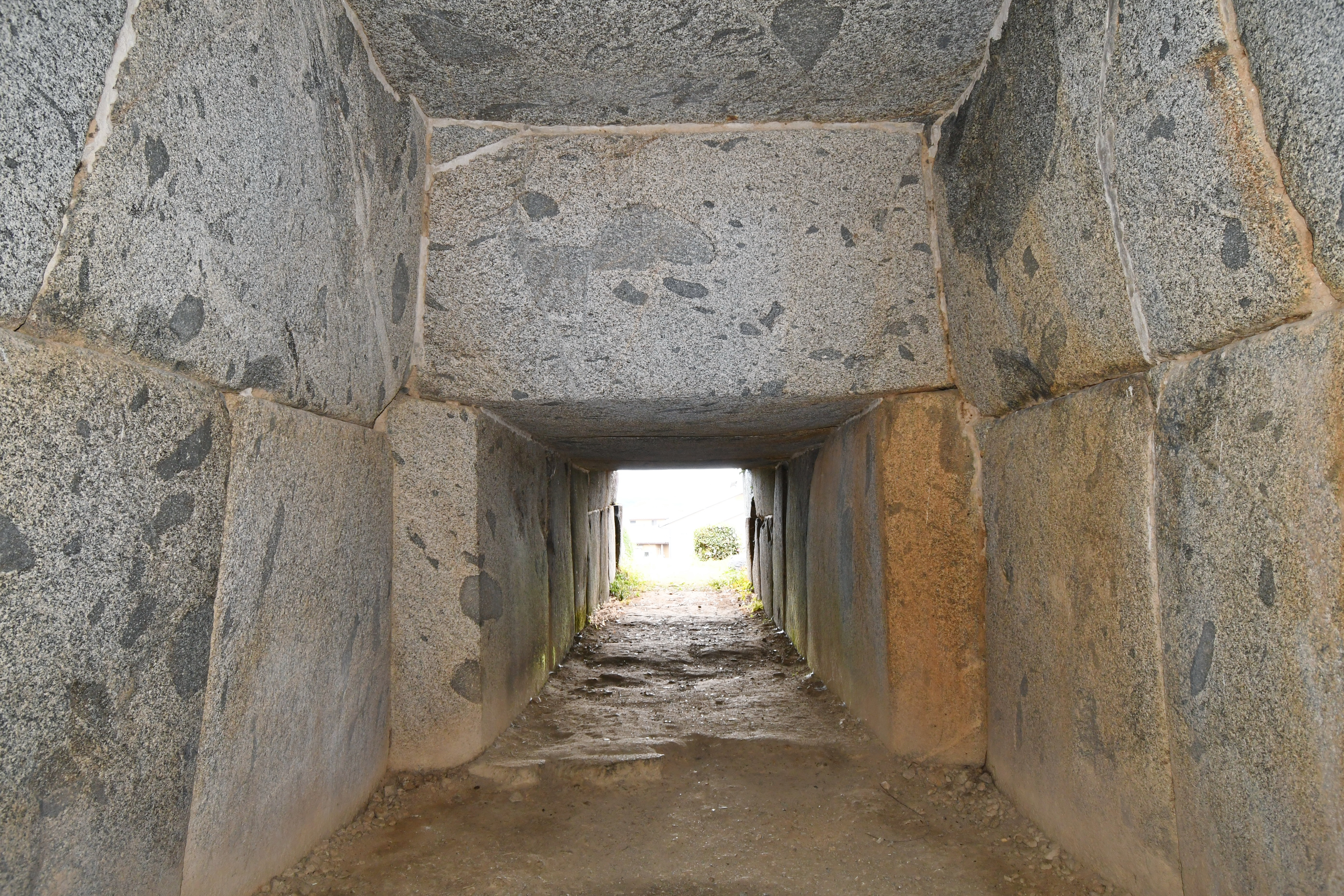
Burial chamber（towards entry）

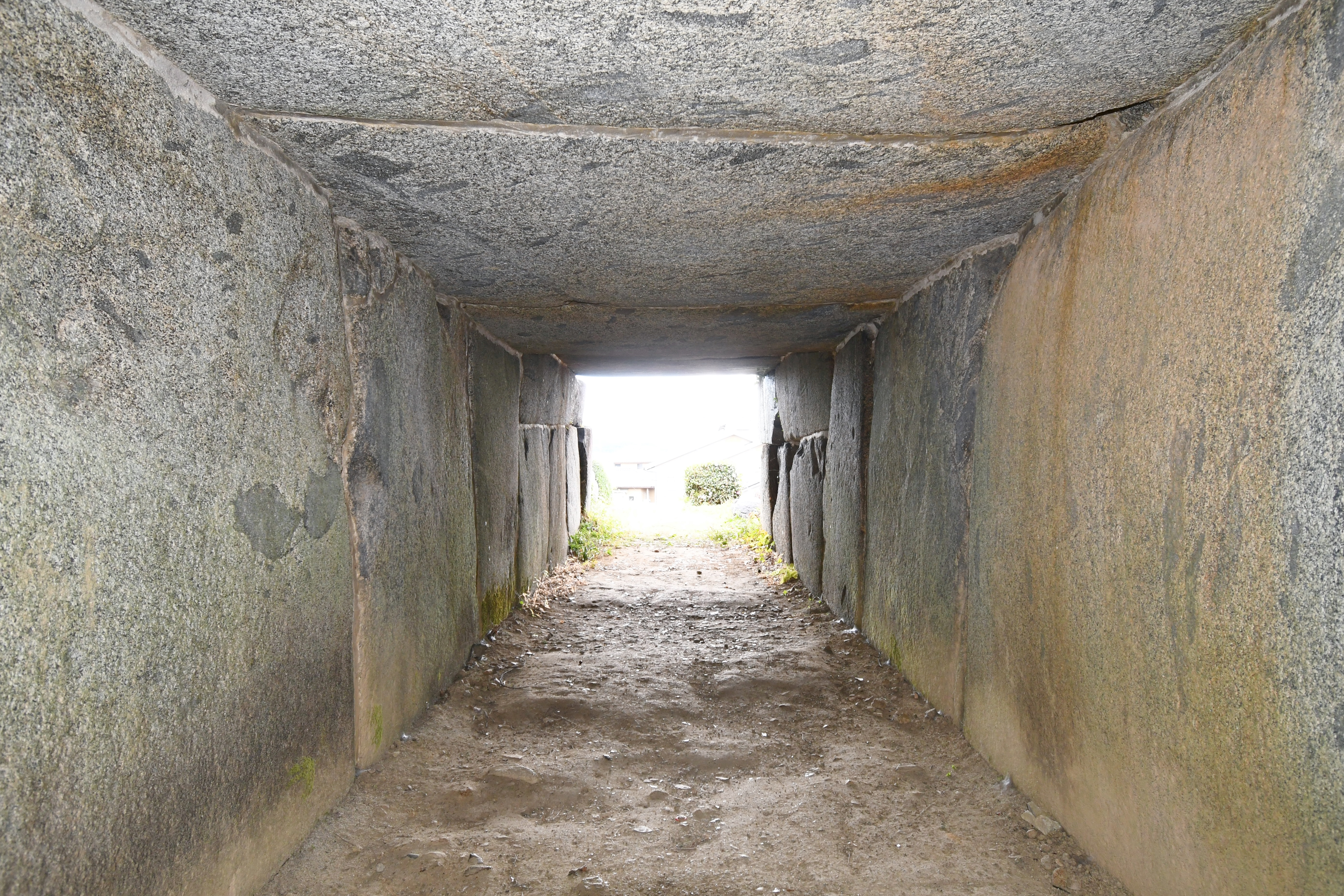
Passage（towards entry）

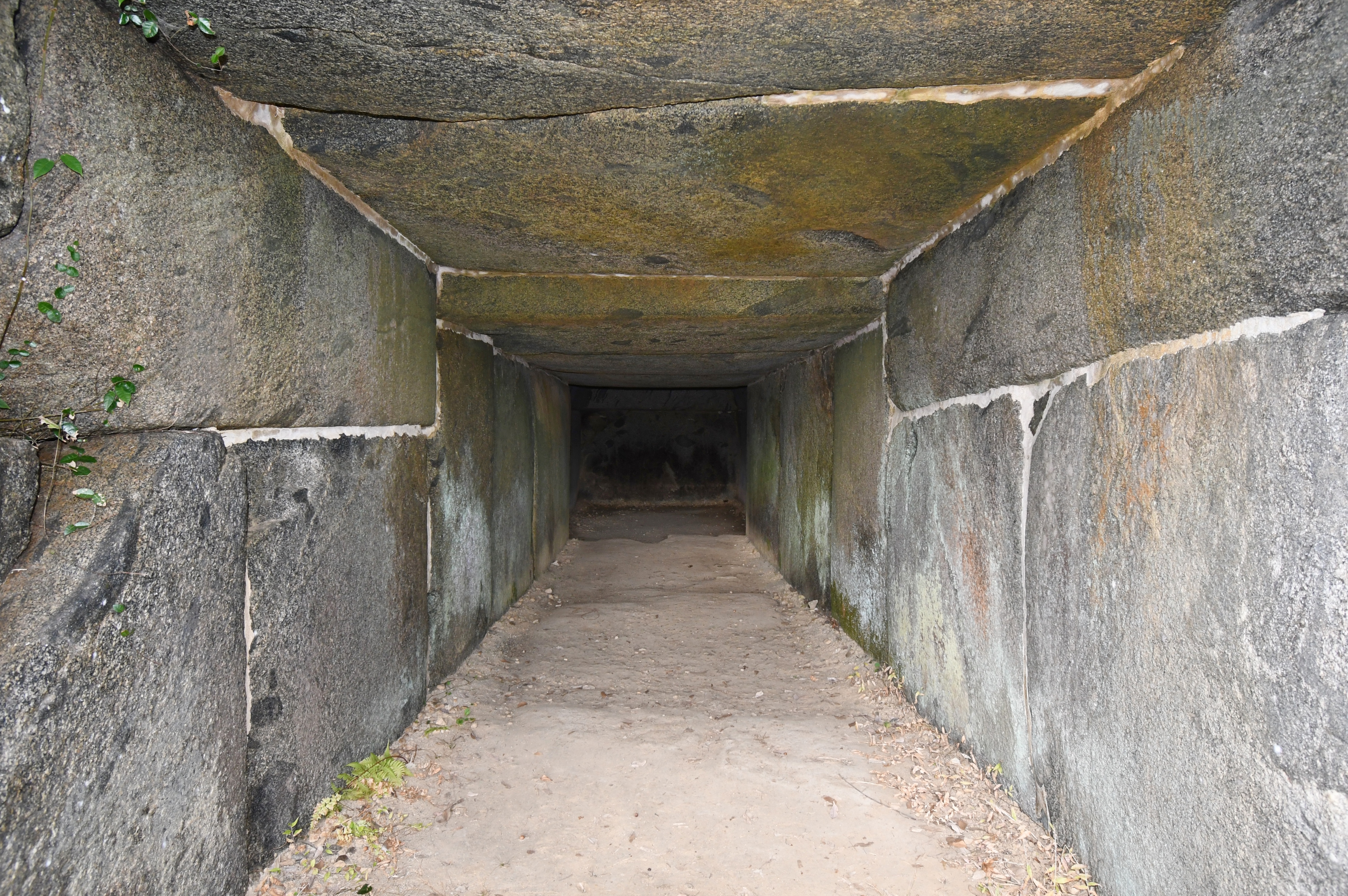
Passage（towards burial chamber）

The tumulus is about two minutes on foot from Asuka Station on the Kintetsu Railway Yoshino Line.

== See also ==
- List of Historic Sites of Japan (Nara)
