= Princess Minushi =

Japanese princess

- Born: c. 7th century
- Died: 22 September 737
Era name and dates
- Asuka period, Nara period: 538—710, 710–794
- House: Yamato
- Father: Emperor Tenji
- Mother: Kurohime Musume
- Religion: Buddhism
- Occupation: Poet

Princess Minushi (水主皇女, Minushi no himemiko; Moitori no himemiko) (died 22 September 737) was a princess in Japan during the Asuka period and the Nara period. She was the last surviving princess of Emperor Tenji. Her mother was Lady Kurohime, whose father was Kurikuma no Tokoma. None of her siblings were recorded.

Her detailed biography is not recorded. Although it was claimed that she was a believer in Buddhism, and in 734, she purchased water fields in Hirose District, Yamato Province, and used them for Gufuku-ji Temple. The “Suishu Gung Sutra” that she created was lent to various places for her copying, and a catalog was even created. On February 14, 737, she was promoted to Sanshin.

Ishikawa no Myobu's poem collected in the Man'yōshū is all that records on her in the history. In the Man'yōshū, the Empress Dowager Gensho ordered Ishikawa no Myobu to compose it to express her hope of Princess Minushi's recovery from illness. It was a few years before her death.
