= Empress Kōgyoku =

Empress of Japan (642–645, 655–661)

Empress Kōgyoku / Empress Saimei 皇極天皇 / 斉明天皇
- Great Queen of Yamato
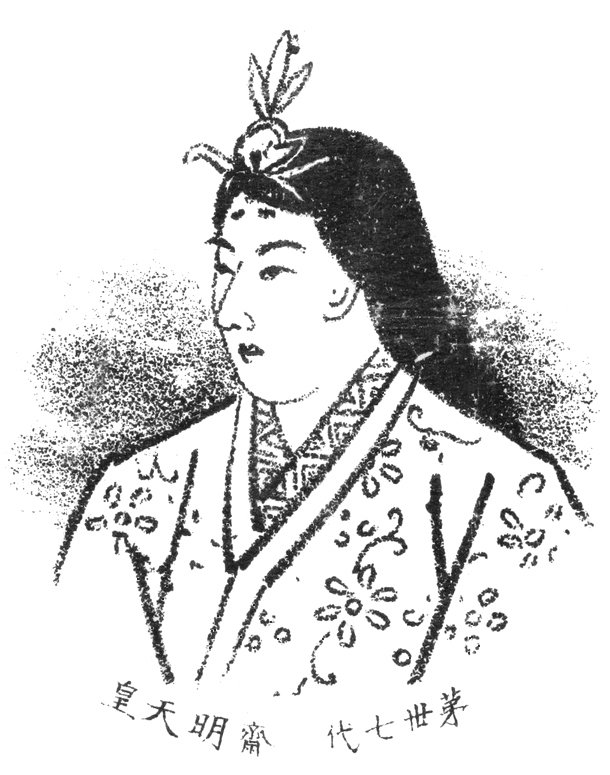

Empress of Japan (Kōgyoku, first reign)
- Reign: 19 February 642 – 12 July 645
- Predecessor: Jomei
- Successor: Kōtoku

(Saimei, second reign)
- Reign: 14 February 655 – 24 August 661
- Predecessor: Kōtoku
- Successor: Tenji

Empress consort of Japan
- Tenure: 630 – 641
- Born: Takara (宝); 7 August 594; Japan
- Died: 24 August 661 (aged 67); Asakura no Miya
- Burial: Ochi-no-Okanoe no misasagi (越智崗上陵) (Nara)
- Spouses: Prince Takamuku; Emperor Jomei
- Issue: Prince Kara; Emperor Tenji; Princess Hashihito; Emperor Tenmu
Posthumous name
- Chinese-style shigō: Empress Kōgyoku (皇極天皇); Empress Saimei (斉明天皇) Japanese-style shigō: Ametoyotakaraikashihitarashi-hime no Sumeramikoto (天豊財重日足姫天皇)
- House: Imperial House of Japan
- Father: Prince Chinu
- Mother: Princess Kibitsu-hime

Empress Kōgyoku (皇極天皇, Kōgyoku-tennō; 7 August 594 – 24 August 661), also known as Empress Saimei (斉明天皇, Saimei-tennō), was the 35th and 37th monarch of Japan, according to the traditional order of succession. Both her reigns were within the Asuka period.

== Pre-ascension ==
Kōgyoku was born on 7 August 594 as Princess Takara (宝). Her father, Prince Chinu, was a minor prince of which little is recorded. Her mother, Princess Kibitsu-hime was similarly a minor princess of which little is written. Paternally Kōgyoku was a great-granddaughter of Emperor Bidatsu and his first wife Hirohime. Maternally she is a great-granddaughter of Emperor Kinmei (Bidatsu's father) and his concubine Soga-no-Kitashihime.

She would marry Prince Takamuku, a grandson of Emperor Yōmei. This marriage produced one child, a son, however the two separated. After separating she married Prince Tamura (later Emperor Jomei).

Tamura and another Prince, Prince Yamashiro, were political rivals. Both claimed that before the then monarch, Empress Suiko, died, she declared the respective Prince her heir. What ensued was a civil war, ultimately ending with Tamura winning. Upon this, Princess Takara would become the empress consort.

The Man'yōshū records correspondence the two sent to each other. Once while the emperor was away, a messenger gave this letter that Takara sent him:

I hear the twang of the mid-strings

Of his royal birchwood bow, Which my Sovereign, ruling in peace, Loves to handle at break of day, And fondly leans against with dusk. Now he must be out for his morning hunt, Now he must be out for his evening chase; I hear the twang of the mid-string

Of his loved birchwood bow!

In 641 Jomei would die. Jomei did not seek to name an heir, and Prince Yamashiro was still alive. In order to ensure a stable succession, and avoid conflict between Prince Yamashiro, and Jomei's own children, his wife, Princess Takara, succeeded to the throne.

== First reign ==
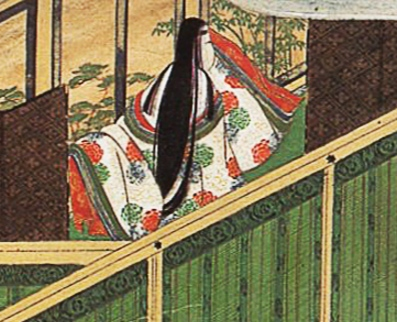
Kōgyoku during the Isshi incident

Princess Takara came to the throne in 642 as Empress Kōgyoku to avoid dynastic conflict. A year into her reign, Prince Yamashiro, his wife Princess Tsukishine and their children would commit suicide after coming into conflict with the Soga clan.

Her first reign as Kōgyoku was mainly marked with the domination of the Soga clan, who had been growing in power. The beginning of her reign was also marked with a drought. Supposedly many clouds could be seen but no rain fell from them. The Nihon Shoki records however that eventually the drought came to an end after the empress prayed to the heavens:

8th month, 1st day. The Emperor made a progress to the river-source of Minabuchi. Here (s)he knelt down and prayed, worshipping towards the four quarters, and looking up to Heaven. Straightway there was thunder and a great rain, which eventually fell for five days, and plentifully bedewed the Empire. [One writing has:—"For five days there was continuous rain, and the nine grains ripened."] Hereupon the peasantry throughout the Empire cried with one voice, "Banzai," and said, "An Emperor of exceeding virtue!"

Before her death, the wife of Prince Yamashiro (Princess Tsukishine) argued against the Soga clan saying "There cannot be two suns in the heavens, nor two sovereigns upon the earth." This argument was also being used by many other people against the Soga clan. Prince Naka no Ōe (the empress's son, and later Emperor Tenji), Nakatomi no Kamatari (later Fujiwara no Kamatari), and other prominent court nobles began arguing against the growing influence of the Soga clan. This growing anger and political unrest would culminate in an event known as the Isshi incident, ending in the assassination of the heir to the Soga clan, Soga no Iruka. Due to Japanese customs about blood impurity and death, and given the fact that Iruka was assassinated in front of her, Kōgyoku had to abdicate, becoming the first Japanese monarch to do so. She would pass the throne to her brother, who would become Emperor Kōtoku.

== Interregnum ==
After abdicating, Kōgyoku received the name Sumemioya. (Note: 皇祖母尊 (Sumemioya no Mikoto, translated as Empress Dowager).) During her time in retirement, she was a respected figure at court. The previous female emperor, Suiko, also saw newfound respect, despite having died over two decades prior, due to her adoption of Buddhism (it was said of the new emperor, Kōtoku that he "honoured the religion of Buddha").

Sumemioya and the crown prince, Naka no Ōe, visited the emperor as his health worsened. Due to the Isshi incident, as well as the fact that Kōgyoku had abdicated, Naka no Ōe was anxious about succeeding to the throne. In order to ensure stable succession, so that the princes legitimacy wasn't called into question, Sumemioya would succeed to the throne again. This was so Naka no Ōe would be directly succeeding one of his parents, thus ensuring stable parent child succession.

== Second reign ==
Sumemioya came to the throne a second time as Saimei. Her son, Prince Naka no Ōe, would continue implementing the Taika Reform.

The empress would begin carrying out an "important task", according to the Nihon Shoki, which is known as Taburegokoro no Mizo. This is a canal and it took 30,000 labourers, which led to criticism from the people. It was used for defence and to transport stone, and the remains are in modern day Asuka, Nara, and are designated as a Japan Heritage site.

Under her second reign, there was opposition to her carrying out large scale projects. Soga no Akae went to the empress's nephew, Prince Arima to lay out three faults in her rule:

There are three faults in the Empress's administration of the affairs of Government. The first is that she builds treasuries on a great scale, wherein she collects the riches of the people. The second is that she wastes the public grain revenue in digging long canals. The third is that she loads barges with stones and transports them to be piled up into a hill.

However, modern historians in the 21st century believe the empress's actions were not reckless, but actually an attempt to build and develop Asuka into a proper capital city.

A rebellion, headed by Soga no Akae and Prince Arima, was planned during her second reign with the intention to depose the empress and her son, Crown Prince Naka no Ōe. The two did not go ahead, but Akae used this to frame Arima and informed the empress of the plot. The Prince and others were questioned and executed by the Crown Prince.

On the continent, one of the Three Kingdoms of Korea, Paekche was destroyed. Paekche was an ally of Japan and so requested Japan's help. She and her army left Yamato Province for Paekche, where many temporary residences were built. However, she would become ill and have to halt her expedition. Many of those with her also died (something which the Nihon Shoki says was due to an angry god) and the empress's illness rapidly accelerated and she died.

== Death ==
After becoming ill, the empress died in 661. Her body was returned to the capital for the funeral. Her son became Emperor Tenji. After her death he was supposedly overcome with emotion and said:

Longing as I do

For a sight of thee, Now that I have arrived here, Even thus do I long

Desirous of a sight of thee!

She was buried at Kengoshizuka Kofun.

According to the Zenkoji Engi, she was damned to hell. However, on her way to hell, the son of Honda Yoshimitsu along with the Amida Buddha saved her and she appointed Honda Yoshimitsu and his son as governors before finally dying. This is not mentioned in any other texts.

== Kugyō ==
Kugyō (公卿) is a collective term for the very few most powerful men attached to the court of the Emperor of Japan in pre-Meiji eras.

In general, this elite group included only three to four men at a time. These were hereditary courtiers whose experience and background would have brought them to the pinnacle of a life's career. During Kōgyoku's reign, this apex of the Daijō-kan included:

- Sadaijin
- Udaijin

The kugyō during Saimei's reign included:

- Sadaijin, Kose no Tokoda (巨勢徳太) (593–658), 649–658
- Udaijin (not appointed)
- Naidaijin (内臣), Nakatomi no Kamako (中臣鎌子) (Fujiwara no Kamatari, 藤原鎌足) (614–669), 645–669

== Spouses and children ==
Empress Saimei, born Princess Takara, was the daughter of Prince Chinu, a grandson of Emperor Bidatsu, and his princess consort.

Firstly, she married Prince Takamuku and had a son. Secondly, the princess married Prince Tamura who also was Emperor Bidatsu's grandson. The marriage produced one daughter and two sons who both ascended the throne in the future.

- First Husband: Prince Takamuku (高向王), Prince Tame's son (also Emperor Yomei’s grandson)
  - First Son: Prince Kara (漢皇子)
- Second Husband: Prince Tamura (田村皇子), later Emperor Jomei, Prince Oshisaka-no-hikohito-no-Ōe's son (also Emperor Bidatsu's grandson)
  - Second Son: Prince Naka no Ōe (中大兄皇子) later Emperor Tenji)
  - First Daughter: Princess Hashihito (間人皇女, d. 665), married Emperor Kōtoku
  - Third Son: Prince Ōama (大海人皇子) later Emperor Tenmu

== Popular culture ==
- Portrayed by Kim Min-kyung in the 2012–2013 KBS1 TV series Dream of the Emperor.

== See also ==
- Empress of Japan
- Emperor of Japan
  - List of emperors of Japan
- Imperial cult

== Notes ==
=== References ===
Regnal titles
Preceded by Emperor Jomei	Empress of Japan: Kōgyoku; 642–645	Succeeded by Emperor Kōtoku
Preceded by Emperor Kōtoku	Empress of Japan: Saimei; 655–661	Succeeded by Emperor Tenji
Royal titles
Preceded by Princess Hashihito no Anahobe	Empress consort of Japan; 630–641	Succeeded by Princess Hashihito
