= Emperor Kōtoku =

Emperor Kōtoku 孝徳天皇
- Great King of Yamato
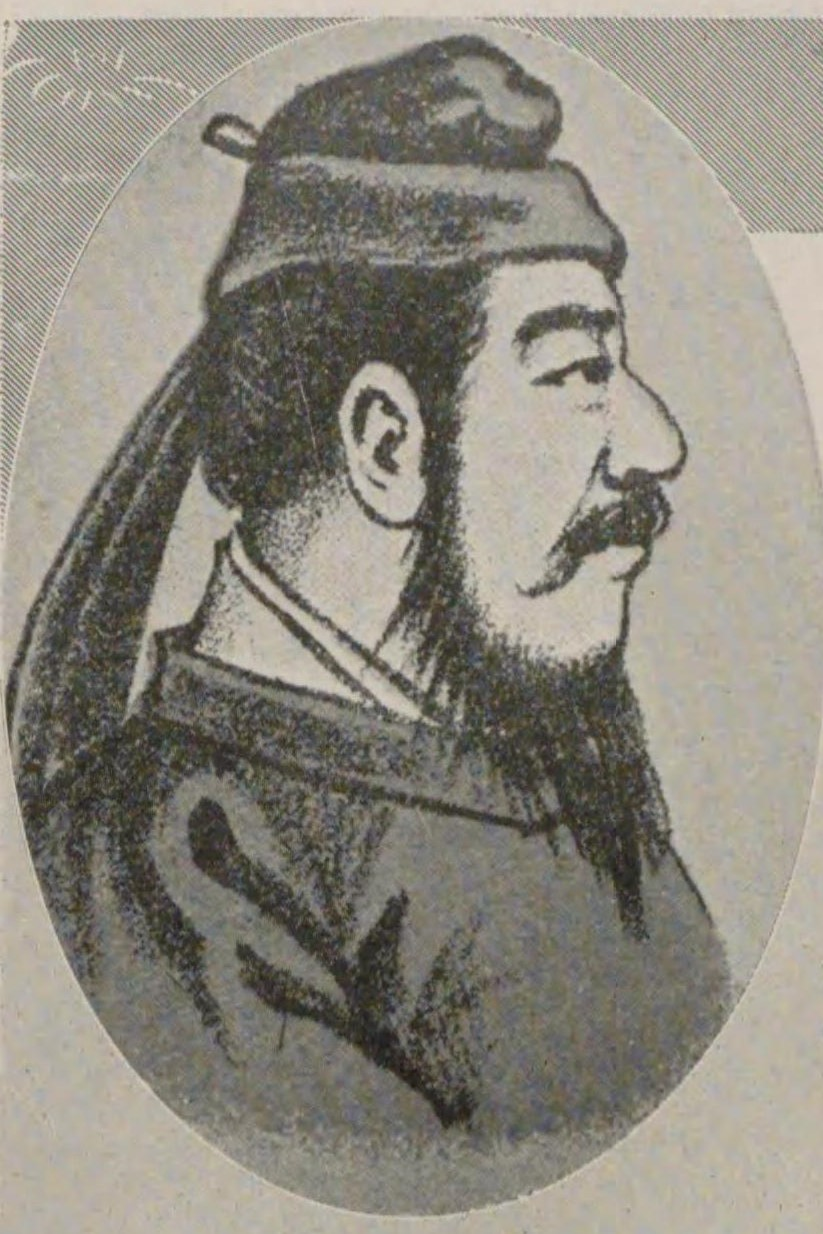

Emperor of Japan
- Reign: 645–654 (AD)
- Predecessor: Kōgyoku
- Successor: Saimei
- Born: Karu (軽); 596 (AD)
- Died: 24 November 654 (age 57 or 58); Toyosaki no Miya (Ōsaka)
- Burial: Ōsaka-no-shinaga no misasagi (大阪磯長陵) (Osaka)
- Spouse: Hashihito
- Issue: Prince Arima
Posthumous name
- Chinese-style shigō: Emperor Kōtoku (孝徳天皇) Japanese-style shigō: Ameyorozutoyohi no Sumeramikoto (天万豊日天皇)
- House: Imperial House of Japan
- Father: Prince Chinu
- Mother: Princess Kibitsu-hime

Emperor Kōtoku (孝徳天皇, Kōtoku-tennō; 596 – 24 November 654) was the 36th emperor of Japan, according to the traditional order of succession.

The years of his reign lasted from 645 through 654.

== Traditional narrative ==
Before Kōtoku's ascension to the Chrysanthemum Throne, his personal name (imina) was Karu (軽) or Prince Karu (軽皇子, Karu-no-Ōji).

He was a descendant of Emperor Bidatsu. He was a son of Chinu no ōkimi (Prince Chinu, 茅渟王) by Kibitsuhime no ōkimi (Princess Kibitsuhime, 吉備姫王). Empress Kōgyoku was his elder sister from the same parents. Chinu was a son of Prince Oshisaka Hikohito no Ōe, whose father was the Emperor Bidatsu. He had at least three consorts including his Empress, Hashihito no Himemiko (Princess Hashihito), the daughter of Emperor Jomei and his sister Empress Kōgyoku. In the 3rd year of Kōgyoku-tennō's reign (皇極天皇三年), the empress abdicated; and the succession (senso) was received by her younger brother. Shortly thereafter, Emperor Kōtoku is said to have acceded to the throne (sokui).

Kōtoku ruled from July 12, 645 (AD), until his death in 654. In 645, he ascended to the throne two days after Prince Naka no Ōe (Emperor Tenji) assassinated Soga no Iruka in the court of Kōgyoku. Kōgyoku abdicated in favor of her son and crown prince, Naka no Ōe, but Naka no Ōe insisted Kōtoku should ascend to the throne instead. Kōtoku's contemporary title would not have been tennō, as most historians believe this title was not introduced until the reigns of Emperor Tenmu and Empress Jitō. Rather, it was presumably Sumeramikoto or Amenoshita Shiroshimesu Ōkimi (治天下大王), meaning "the great king who rules all under heaven". Alternatively, Kōtoku might have been referred to as (ヤマト大王/大君) or the "Great King of Yamato". According to the Nihonshoki, he was of gentle personality and was in favor of Buddhism.

In 645, he established a new capital city at Naniwa-kyō. The new capital had a seaport and was good for foreign trade and diplomatic activities. In 653, Kōtoku sent an envoy to the court of the Tang dynasty in China, but some of the ships were lost en route.

Naka no Ōe held the rank of crown prince and was the de facto leader of the government. In 653 Naka no Ōe proposed to move the capital again to Yamato province. Kōtoku denied. Naka no Ōe ignored the emperor's policy and moved to the former province. Many courtiers of the court, including Empress Hashihito, followed him. Kōtoku was left in the palace. In the next year he died of an illness. After his death, Naka would not ascend to the throne. Instead, his mother and the sister of Kōtoku, the former Empress Kogyoku, ascended to the throne under another name, Empress Saimei.

He enacted the Taika Reform edicts. The system of hasshō kyakkan (eight ministries and a hundred offices) was first established during the reign of Emperor Kōtoku.

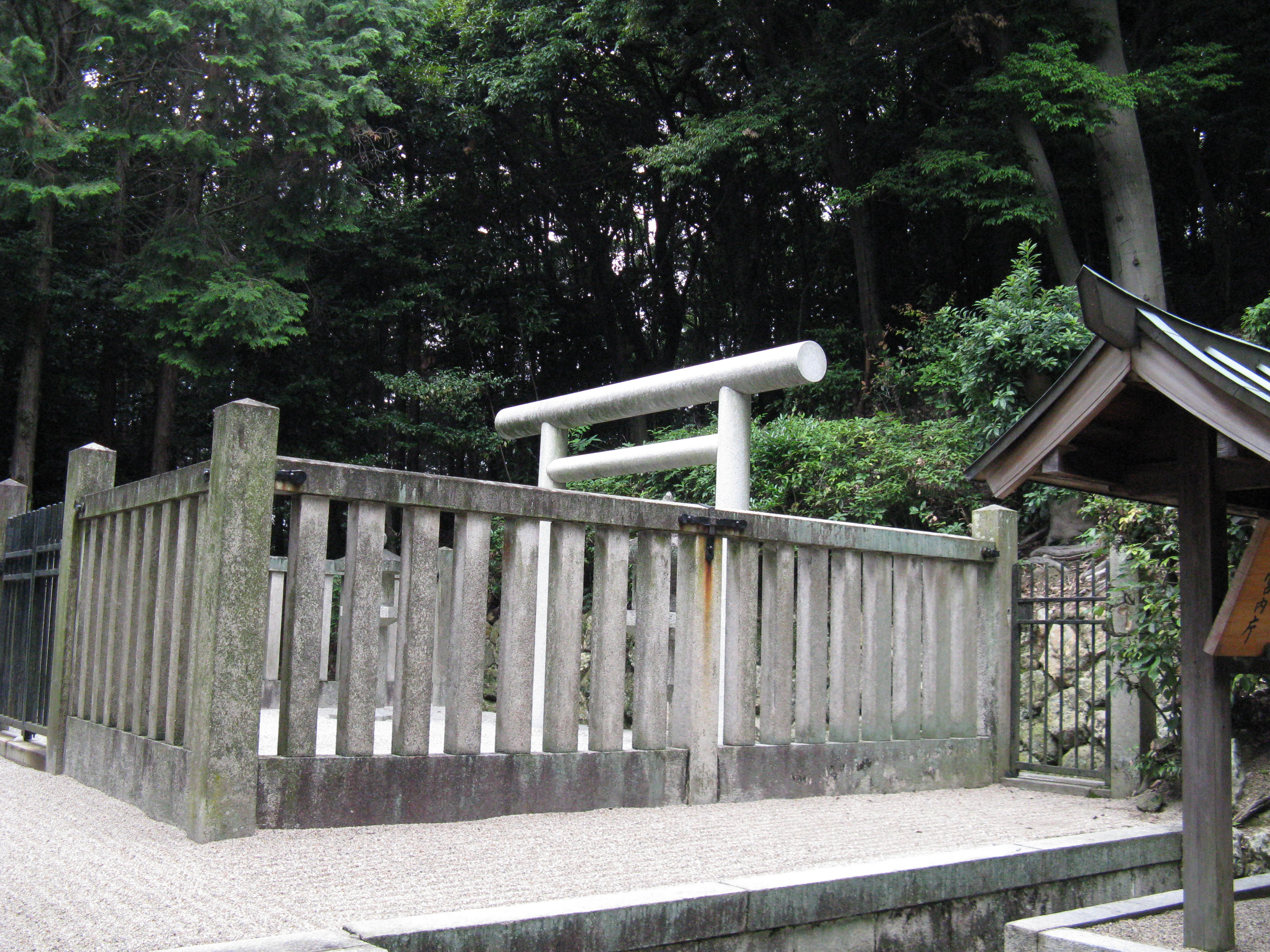
Memorial Shinto shrine and mausoleum honoring Emperor Kōtoku

The actual site of Kōtoku's grave is known. This emperor is traditionally venerated at a memorial Shinto shrine (misasagi) at Osaka. The Imperial Household Agency designates this location as Kōtoku's mausoleum. It is formally named Ōsaka-no-shinaga no misasagi.

Traditionally the monk Hōdō, was born in today India, and traveled to Japan via Tang China and the Baekje kingdom in Korea. Hōdō cured an illness of the Emperor Kōtoku (596 – 654 AD), who then sent the monk to establish numerous Buddhist temples. According to legend Hōdō founded Tenjō-ji in 646 (AD). The monk is worshipped in the Gion faith.

=== Kugyō ===
Kugyō (公卿) is a collective term for the very few most powerful men attached to the court of the Emperor of Japan in pre-Meiji eras.

In general, this elite group included only three to four men at a time. These were hereditary courtiers whose experience and background would have brought them to the pinnacle of a life's career. During Kōtoko's reign, this apex of the Daijō-kan included:

- Sadaijin, Abe no Kurahashi-maro (阿部倉梯麻呂) (d. 649), 645–649.
- Sadaijin, Kose no Tokoda (巨勢徳太) (593–658), 649–658.
- Udaijin, Soga no Kura-no-Yamada no Ishikawa-no-maro (蘇我倉山田石川麻呂) (d. 649), 645–649.
- Udaijin, Ōtomo no Nagatoko (大伴長徳) (d. 651), 649–651.
- Naidaijin(内臣), Nakatomi Kamako (中臣鎌子) (Fujiwara no Kamatari, 藤原鎌足) (614–669), 645–669.

== Eras of Kōtoku's reign ==
The years of Kōtoku's reign are more specifically identified by more than one era name or nengō.

- Taika (645–650)
- Hakuchi (650–655)

== Consorts and children ==
Empress: Princess Hashihito (間人皇女, d. 665), Emperor Jomei and Empress Kogyoku's daughter

Hi: Abe no Otarashi-hime (阿部小足媛), Abe no Kurahashi-maro's daughter

- Prince Arima (有間皇子, 640–658)

Hi: Saga no Chi-no-iratsume (蘇我乳娘), Soga no Kura-no-Yamada no Ishikawa-no-maro's daughter

== Ancestry ==
Ancestors of Emperor Kōtoku

8.Emperor Bidatsu (538–585)
4. Prince Oshisakanohikohito-no-Ōe
9. Hiro-hime (d. c. 575)
2. Prince Chinu
10. Emperor Bidatsu (538–585)
5. Princess Nukate-hime (c. 570–664)
11. Unako no Otoshi
1. Emperor Kōtoku
12. Emperor Kinmei (509–571)
6. Sakurai no Miko (560–587)
13. Soga no Kitashihime
3. Princess Kibitsu-hime (d. 643)

== See also ==
- Emperor of Japan
- List of Emperors of Japan
- Imperial cult

== Notes ==
Regnal titles
Preceded by Empress Kōgyoku	Emperor of Japan: Kōtoku; 645–654	Succeeded by Empress Saimei
