= Emperor Tenji =

Emperor of Japan from 668 to 672

Emperor Tenji 天智天皇
- Great King of Yamato
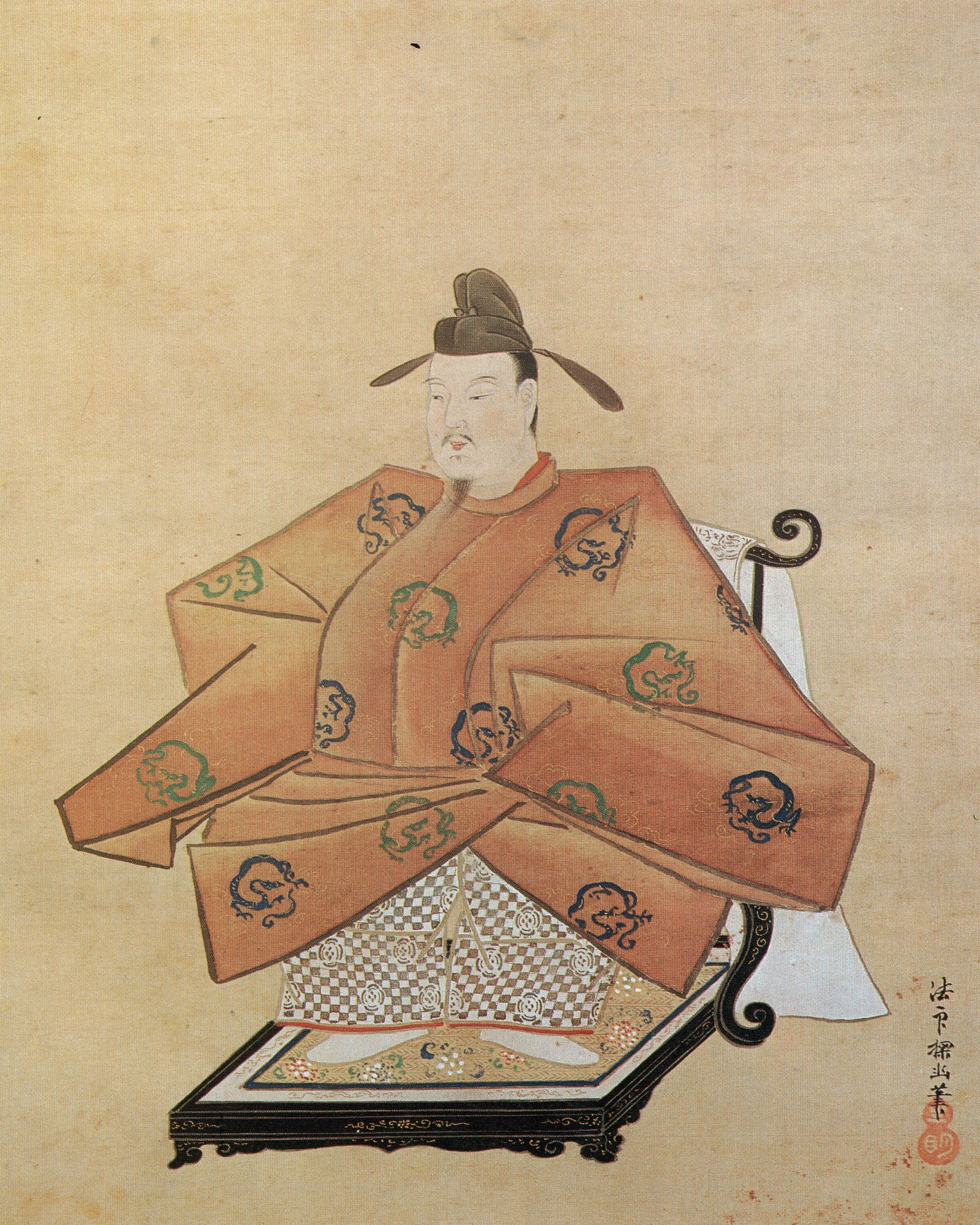
- 17th-century depiction of Tenji

Emperor of Japan
- Reign: 668–672
- Predecessor: Saimei
- Successor: Kōbun (disputed); Tenmu
- Born: Prince Kazuraki (葛城); 626
- Died: 672 (aged 45–46); Ōtsu, Ōmi Province
- Spouse: Yamato Hime no Ōkimi
- Issue among others...: Princess Ōta; Empress Jitō; Princess Minabe; Empress Genmei; Princess Yamanobe; Princess Asuka; Princess Niitabe; Princess Ōe; Princess Izumi; Princess Minushi; Emperor Kōbun
Posthumous name
- Chinese-style shigō: Emperor Tenji (天智天皇); Japanese-style shigō: Amemikoto Hirakasuwake (天命開別)
- House: Imperial House of Japan
- Father: Emperor Jomei
- Mother: Empress Kōgyoku

Emperor Tenji (also romanized Tenchi, 626–671) was the 38th emperor of Japan according to the traditional order of succession. Initially known as Prince Kazuraki, and later Prince Naka no Ōe, he was the son of Emperor Jomei and Empress Kōgyoku. After his father's death in 641, the young Prince Naka entered into a succession dispute with another imperial prince, Yamashiro. To mediate, Empress Kōgyoku ascended the throne. Naka conspired with a group of aristocrats to assassinate the authoritarian minister Soga no Iruka in 645. After the assassination, Kōgyoku resigned as ruler and was succeeded by her brother (Naka's uncle), Emperor Kōtoku, who appointed Naka as his heir. However, after Kōtoku's death in 654, Kōgyoku reascended the throne as Empress Saimei. She died in 661 amid preparations for an expedition to Korea, where the forces of Tang China and Silla defeated those of Japan. Prince Naka did not immediately ascend to the throne, instead serving as regent for the following seven years.

During his term as regent, Naka implemented reforms to the imperial court and built up military infrastructure in Kyushu, fearing a Chinese invasion. He moved the capital to the Ōmi Ōtsu Palace northeast of Asuka, after which he ascended to the throne as emperor. He established the Daijō-kan (Council of State), appointing his son Prince Ōtomo as the inaugural Daijō-daijin ('prime minister'), and allegedly ordered the compilation of the first version of the Ritsuryō law code. He fell ill and died in 671, prompting a succession dispute between Prince Ōtomo and Tenji's brother, Prince Ōama. It is unknown which Tenji wished to succeed him. The dispute broke out into a brief civil war, which ended with the victory of Ōama, who then ruled as Emperor Tenmu. Tenji was not memorialized under Tenmu's reign, but was given a burial tumulus in 700 under the reign of his daughter, Empress Jitō.

The 8th-century history chronicle Nihon Shoki dedicates relatively little coverage to Tenji's reign, although it emphasizes his importance during the reigns of his predecessors. He received poems in honor of him in the 8th-century anthologies Man'yōshū and Kaifūsō, including a cycle of nine banka elegies. Tenji's reign at Ōmi was traditionally portrayed as a golden age for art and culture, although this was likely overstated by later chroniclers.

== Early life ==
Prince Kazuraki was born in 626 as the eldest son of Prince Tamura (later known as Emperor Jomei) and his consort Princess Takara (later known as Empress Kōgyoku). Two years later, the empress regnant Suiko died. This caused a succession crisis, as two of her potential successors (her nephew Prince Shōtoku and son Prince Takeda) had recently died, leaving Prince Tamura and Prince Yamashiro as the highest ranking princes. Tamura was the grandson of Emperor Bidatsu, Suiko's consort and brother, while Yamashiro was Prince Shōtoku's son. Unlike in the earlier succession crisis which brought Suiko to the throne, there were no imperial princesses in a position to serve as a neutral candidate.

Simplified family tree of the Asuka period imperial house

Emperor Kinmei r. 531–571
Emperor Yōmei r. 585–587
Emperor Sushun r. 587–593
Empress Suiko r. 593–628	Emperor Bidatsu r. 572–585
Prince Shōtoku	Prince Takeda	Prince Oshisakao no Hikohito
Prince Chinu
Prince Yamashiro	Emperor Jomei (Prince Tamura) r. 629–641	Empress Kōgyoku/Saimei (Princess Takara) r. 642–645, 655–661	Emperor Kōtoku (Prince Karu) r. 645–654)
Prince Furuhito no Ōji	Emperor Tenji (Prince Naka no Ōe) r. 668–671	Emperor Tenmu (Prince Ōama) r. 673–686

The powerful Senior Minister Soga no Emishi backed Prince Tamura's candidacy, and Tamura took the throne in 629 as Emperor Jomei. However, Yamashiro continued to serve as a pretender. The Nihon Shoki, an early 8th century chronicle produced by the imperial court, first mentions Prince Kazuraki when describing Jomei's ascension. After his father's ascension, he took a new name, Naka no Ōe no Ōji (中大兄皇子; 'middle senior prince'), likely indicating preferential status in the line of succession. However, he would not officially become the heir to the throne until 645. Minabuchi Shōan, part of an embassy of Japanese scholars who studied in China from 608 to 640, tutored Prince Naka on Confucian philosophy.

Emperor Jomei died in 641, beginning a succession dispute between Prince Yamashiro and Prince Naka. As the latter was only sixteen years old, he was considered too young to rule. Soga no Emishi proposed that another of Jomei's sons, Naka's half-brother Prince Furuhito no Ōji, should take the throne instead. However, Emishi was unable to secure support for this candidate. Reportedly, Naka's mother Princess Takara was instead instated, following the precedent set by Suiko, and reigned as Empress Kōgyoku. However, some scholars have theorized that there may have been an interregnum, with no sovereign until 645. The Nihon Shoki names Naka as Kōgyoku's heir, although it is more likely that Furuhito served in this position.

=== Isshi incident ===
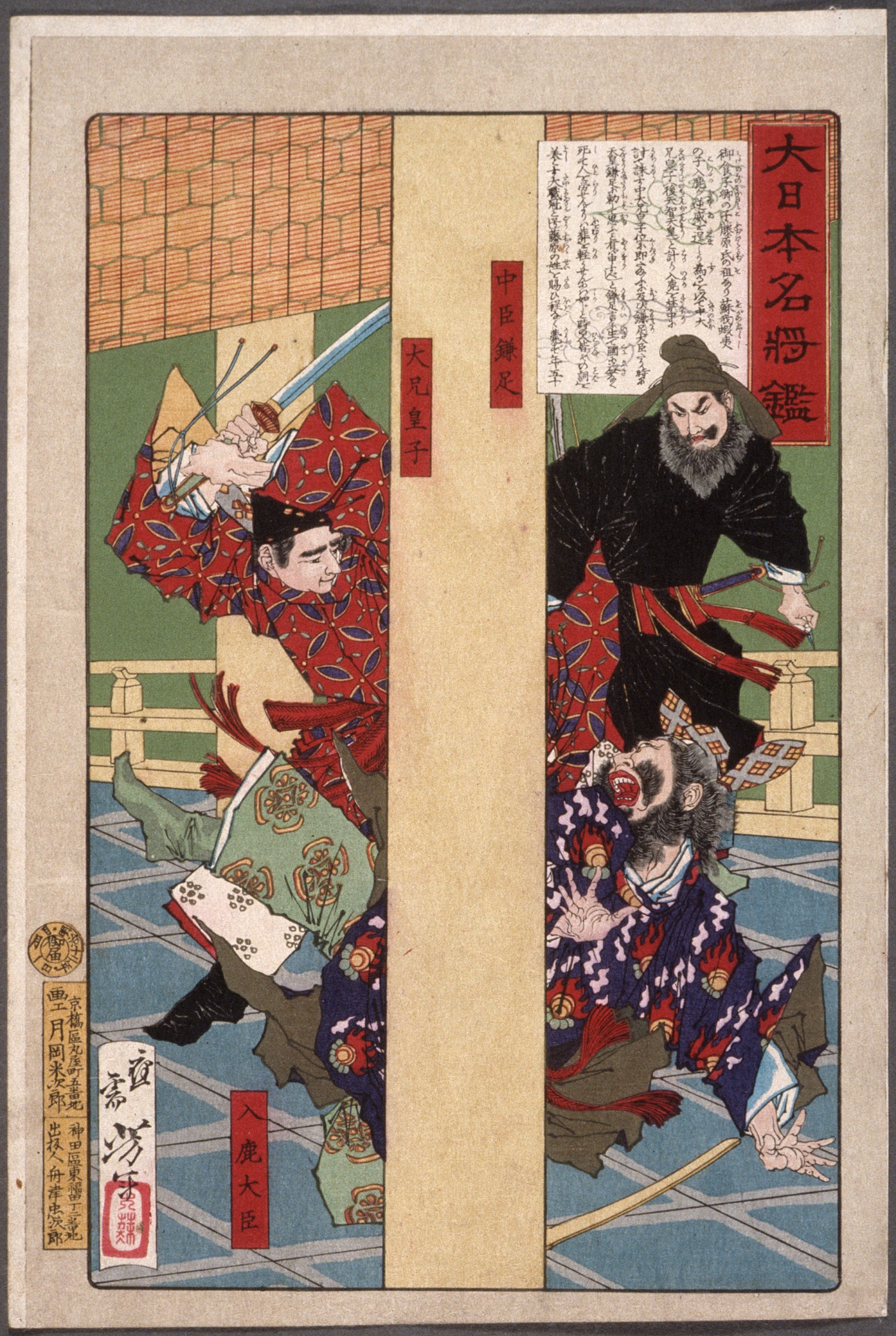
1879 depiction of Kamatari (right) and Prince Naka (left) attacking Iruka

Empress Kōgyoku had much less authority over her ministers than prior sovereigns. Some historians have theorized that this reign was a later historical fabrication, and that there was in fact no sovereign during this period. In the early 640s, Soga no Emishi's son Soga no Iruka emerged as an authoritarian political leader. The Nihon Shoki records that Iruka built palaces for himself and his father, stockpiled weapons, and began to refer to members of the clan as princes and princesses. In 642, Prince Yamashiro's sister openly criticized her brother for constructing extravagant tombs for himself and their father using forced labor. In response, Iruka dispatched a military force to attack Yamashiro's family, forcing him and thirty-two of his close relatives to commit suicide.

By 643, the Nihon Shoki relays that Iruka's activities had prompted the aristocrat Nakatomi no Kamatari to recruit conspirators to overthrow him. He approached figures such as Prince Naka, Kōgyoku's younger brother Prince Karu, and the military commander Soga no Ishikawa Maro. In reality, as a relatively low-level courtier at the time, Kamatari may have been a minor player in the plot whose importance was exaggerated by later chroniclers. In 644, the military dictator Yŏn Kaesomun overthrew and massacred the royal family of the Korean kingdom of Goguryeo, sparking a Tang invasion and likely fears among Japanese nobles that Iruka would do the same.

In the 6th month of 645, four days before a court ceremony where memorials from the Korean kingdoms would be presented to Empress Kōgyoku, Prince Naka explained to the other conspirators his plot to kill Iruka. By the day of the ceremony, Naka had the palace gates closed, bribed guards, hid a spear in the great hall, gained the support of a group of soldiers, and arranged for four men to attack Iruka during the ceremony, in what would be known as the Isshi incident.

During the ceremony, the conspirator reading out the memorials to Kōgyoku had difficulties continuing to read, and the men Naka had ordered to attack Iruka hesitated. Naka instead rushed forward and attacked Iruka with a sword, hitting him in his head and shoulder. The wounded Iruka claimed that he was innocent of the charges against him. Naka explained his case to Kōgyoku, claiming that Iruka intended to usurp the imperial throne for the Soga clan. She left the room, and Naka's assassins killed Iruka. His father, Soga no Emishi, killed himself at Hōkō-ji.

According to the Nihon Shoki, a building housing the imperial and provincial chronicles, alongside various other precious items, was set aflame during the incident. The courtier Fune no Fubito is said to have rushed into the building to save the provincial chronicles, and presented them as a gift to Prince Naka. The chronicles burned were likely compiled by Prince Shōtoku and Soga no Umako in 620, and likely had a pro-Soga bias. As such, their destruction may have been an effort by the conspirators to minimize the Soga legacy.

== Heir apparent ==
Within days of the Isshi incident, Kōgyoku abdicated, and her stepson Furuhito was sent to become a Buddhist monk. The Empress's younger brother, Prince Karu, took the throne as Emperor Kōtoku; both Kamatari and Naka have been described as the force behind Kōtoku's selection. Naka took control of state affairs, occupying a similar role to what Prince Shōtoku had taken. Kamatari became inner minister (equivalent to an advisor to the emperor), while Soga no Ishikawa Maro became minister of the right.

The post-coup government quickly implemented various reforms, beginning a decades-long transformation of the imperial government which would later be known as the Taika Reforms. The Nihon Shoki describes the reforms, which purportedly overhauled the taxation system and set the borders for the provinces. Over the course of 645, the government was said to have established a new governance system for Buddhist temple affairs, began a census and land survey, and set up a system of provincial emissaries. In an attempt to prevent future revolts, weapons were confiscated across Japan.

Also in 645, the imperial court decided to move from Asuka to the port of Naniwa-kyō in modern day Osaka, likely to have easier access to diplomatic communications. Early into the new administration, Emperor Kōtoku and Prince Naka called a meeting of the new ministers, and had them swear an oath of allegiance. The Naniwa Nagaratoyosaki palace was completed in 652, including a Chinese-style temple. The Nihon Shoki describes a falling out between Naka and Kōtoku over unspecified reasons, which led Naka and Kōgyoku to return to Asuka in 653. The chronicles cover Kōtoku's reign little, avoiding direct mention of him when describing imperial edicts; these are instead presented through Prince Naka (or other courtiers) relaying them to others. This was likely done to elevate Naka's importance with regard to the Taika Reforms.

Emperor Kōtoku died in 654, and Kōgyoku again took the throne, ruling from Asuka under the new name Empress Saimei. It is unknown why Prince Naka, the heir, was passed over in the succession. The Nihon Shoki records that Naka oversaw the construction of a water clock in Asuka in 660, the first in Japan. This had ritual and political connotations, tying the monarchy to roles of timekeeping traditionally held by Chinese sovereigns.

In late 660, the Korean kingdom of Paekche collapsed in a war against the Tang dynasty of China and the kingdom of Silla. After the Tang forces withdrew from the region, the Japanese imperial court partnered with restorations in Paekche and prepared a military expedition to restore the allied kingdom. In 661, Prince Naka visited Naniwa to manage plans for the naval expedition. Empress Saimei traveled to Tsukushi Province (in modern Fukuoka Prefecture on Kyushu) to oversee the preparations for a military expedition to Korea, accompanied by her sons Naka and Ōama as well as Kamatari. Soon after meeting with returning diplomats in Tsukushi, the Empress died.

=== Regency ===
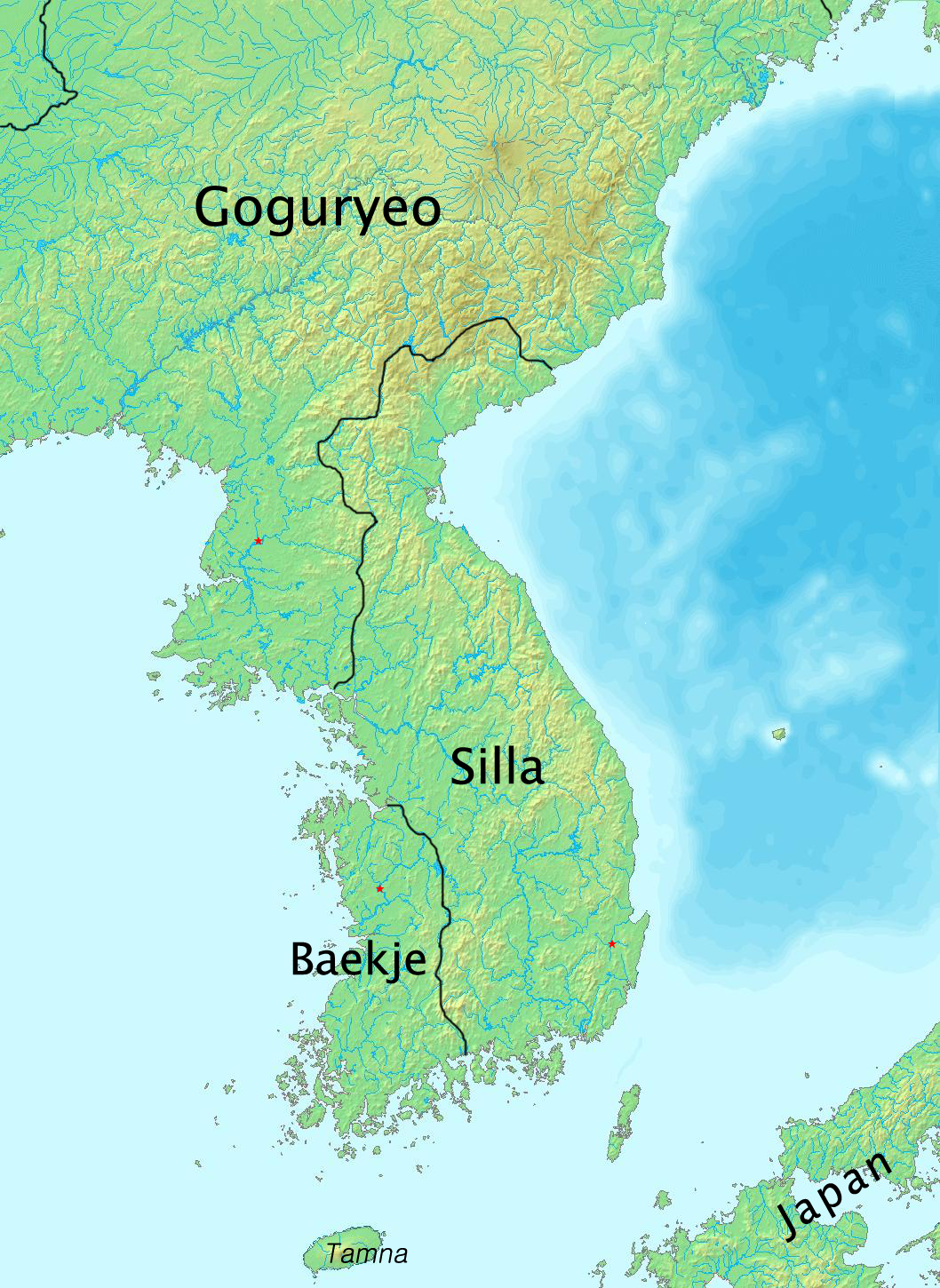
Borders of the Three Kingdoms of Korea prior to the collapse of Paekche (here romanized Baekje)

After Saimei's death, Prince Naka became the regent, but the position of emperor was left vacant. He further mobilized the military. The Paekche prince Pung had been sent to Japan as a hostage in 631; he returned to Korea by 661 as part of a Japanese-backed movement to restore the Paekche monarchy. Japanese forces arrived in the region by 662, and restorationist rebels enthroned Pung as king. The rebels were able to secure a region around the old capital of Sabi and hold off Tang and Silla forces. In 663, the Tang and Silla navies destroyed the Japanese fleet at the mouth of the Geum River, killing many Japanese soldiers. Pung fled north to Goguryeo, and the rebellion in Paekche collapsed, leading to the loss of Japanese influence in Korea.

The defeat at the Geum prompted fears of an invasion of Japan. Naka oversaw the construction of fortifications on the islands of Tsushima and Iki, and established the Dazaifu regional government at Hakata Bay on Kyushu, alongside a network of forts and signal beacons. The new Tang-controlled government of Paekche sent delegations to Japan over the following two years, leading to the restoration of Japan's friendly relations with the Tang and Silla. However, by 667, Tang forces under Emperor Gaozong invaded Goguryeo, leading to its collapse by the following year. Japan refused to send a military expedition to Goguryeo, focusing instead on building up its defenses. Following the collapse of Paekche and Goguryeo, thousands of migrants fled from there to Japan. Many of these migrants were former elites and officials, and received positions in the Japanese government. They allowed for the transmission of new military technology and methods of statecraft to Japan. In 667, Naka moved the imperial seat away from Asuka to the new Ōmi Ōtsu Palace at Ōtsu, situated between Lake Biwa and the mountains. The location was easily defensible, allowed for easier connection to the eastern provinces, and was adjacent to the provinces of Ōmi and Yamashiro, areas heavily settled by Korean refugees.

In 664, Prince Naka is recorded to have ordered his younger brother Ōama to reform and expand the system of court ranks to 26 ranks, integrating regional elites. Heads of noble families were obligated to receive confirmation in their positions by the imperial court. Implemented by 671, these reforms may have been an attempt to reform the system of court ranks along Chinese and Korean lines. The provincial emissaries drew new districts boundaries across the realm, and conducted a census in 670.

== Reign ==
In 668, following the move to Ōmi, Prince Naka was officially enthroned as emperor, a reign referred to by his posthumous name Tenji. That year, he is said to have ordered the compilation of a law code, the first iteration of the Ritsuryō, as well as the compilation of ceremonial regulations. Scholars generally consider it unlikely that Tenji ordered the law code, viewing it as an anachronism. He later established the Daijō-kan (Council of State), an executive body consisting of six ministries, alongside several ministers and advisors. It was headed by a Daijō-daijin ('prime minister'), tasked with carrying out the emperor's orders. The inaugural Daijō-daijin was Tenji's son Prince Ōtomo, codifying the elevated status of senior princes previously held by Tenji and Prince Shōtoku.

Taking advantage of the influx of scholars and literary material from Tang China, Tenji established a university at Ōtsu, and recruited noted scholars and poets to his court. Chinese encyclopedias and dictionaries circulated among his courtiers. Due to increased familiarity with the Chinese classics among the imperial government, Tenji was depicted as a Son of Heaven, following the Chinese concept of divine rulership. A Japanese embassy was dispatched to Tang China in 669. This would be the last such official delegation until 701. Sources such as the Nihon Shoki and the 8th-century poetry anthology Kaifūsō portray Tenji's reign in Ōmi as a golden age of prosperity and artistic achievement.

The Nihon Shoki is inconsistent when describing who Tenji appointed as his heir. Tenji's brother Ōama is most frequently referred to as the heir, with titles such as Eastern Prince (東宮), but other accounts instead claim that the Emperor's son Ōtomo was his heir. As Ōtomo's mother was a low-ranking concubine, Ōama may have had more political legitimacy, being the son of two previous rulers.

== Death and succession ==
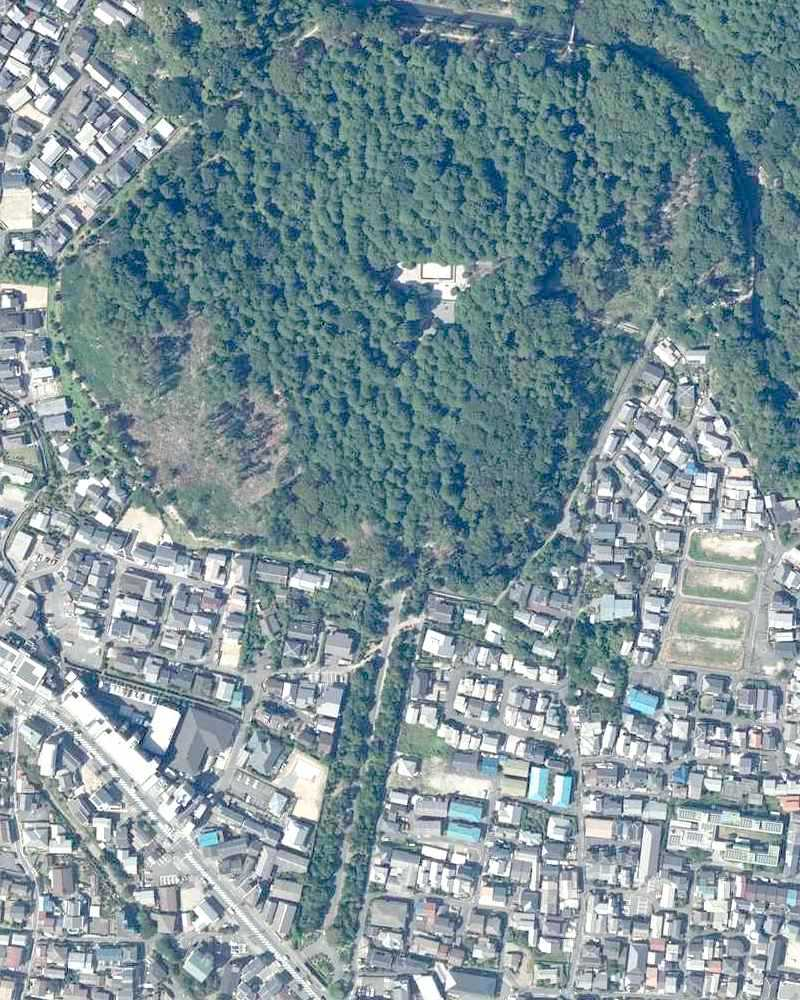
The tumulus of Emperor Tenji in modern Kyoto, as seen from above

Tenji suffered an illness in 671. Attempting to secure his recovery through religious means, he authorized a mass admission of novices to Buddhist monastic orders. Different chapters of the Nihon Shoki give contradicting accounts of the events around Tenji's death and succession, portraying him and Prince Ōama alternatively as allies or rivals. The Tenji volume states that Tenji summoned Ōama on his deathbed and offered him the throne. Ōama refused on the grounds of poor health, and suggested that Tenji's consort Yamato-hime instead serve as empress regent, with Ōtomo as the state minister. The volume then states that Prince Ōama gained his permission to leave the capital and become a Buddhist monk. In contrast, the volume covering Ōama's reign as Emperor Tenmu states that the minister Soga no Yasumaro warned Ōama to "think carefully before you speak", leading him to suspect that the offer of the throne was in reality a plot against him. Tenji died in the last month of 671.

After Tenji's death, a succession dispute broke out between Prince Ōama and Prince Ōtomo, leading to the Jinshin War. Ōtomo controlled the palace at Ōmi, while Ōama traveled to the eastern and northern provinces to rally support against him. The Japanese government retroactively recognized Ōtomo as a legitimate emperor in 1870, under the posthumous title Emperor Kōbun. However, it is unknown whether he was ever enthroned; some historians instead posit that Yamato-hime served as a regent during the war. Alternatively, there may have simply been no emperor during this period. After several battles, Ōtomo was defeated and forced to commit suicide. Ōama was enthroned as Emperor Tenmu in 673.

=== Legacy ===
But to leave Yamato, so full of heaven,
and cross the Nara hills, so rich in green,
what designs, were in his mind,
that in a barbarous place, far from heaven,
in the land of Ōmi of the racing rocks,
in the palace of Ōtsu of the rippling waves,
he reigned and ruled all under heaven?

天尓満倭乎置而
青丹吉平山乎超
何方御念食可
天離夷者雖有
走淡海國乃
楽浪乃大津宮尓
天下所知食兼

— Kakinomoto no Hitomaro, 'At the time of visiting the ruined Ōmi capital', Volume I of the Man'yōshū

The Emperor was honored with the posthumous name Tenji. The names Tenji and Tenmu both refer to heaven through the syllable ten. Emperor Tenji was also given the Japanese-style posthumous name Amemikoto Hirakasuwake (天命開別).

Tenji was not memorialized under Tenmu's reign, as the imperial court sought to emphasize Tenmu's role as a transformative and powerful ruler. Tenji was initially the only Japanese ruler since the mythical Emperor Ōjin not to be honored with an official mausoleum or burial after his death. However, his memory began to be rehabilitated at the end of the century, during the reign of his daughter Empress Jitō. Around 700, a tomb was constructed in his honor. His tomb is octagonal, covered by a round tumulus. This was a new form of burial first used for his mother Saimei. It was intended to represent universal rule and distinguish the tombs of the sovereigns from the similarly grand tombs made for the chiefs of prominent uji (clans).

Shortly before her death in 703, the empress emerita Jitō ordered that Tenji be honored in the imperial memorial ceremonies. The reign of Tenmu's descendants came to an end with the ascension of Emperor Kōnin, one of Tenji's grandsons, in 770. All Japanese emperors since then have been descendants of Tenji.

The Man'yōshū, a collection of Japanese poetry compiled during the mid-8th century, contains a long sequence of nine banka (elegies, literally 'coffin-puller's songs') centered around Tenji's death and burial. These comprise six tanka (short poems) and three chōka (long poems). The Man'yōshū attributes the first banka to Prince Arima in the late 650s, although the Tenji banka are more closely tied to funerary rituals, leading scholar Kevin Collins to describe them as the "first real banka". Commentators have praised these poems for their lyrical qualities, possibly reflecting a broader perception of Tenji's reign as a flourishing of culture.

Unlike Jomei or Tenmu, there is no "imperial poem" attributed to Tenji in the Ōmi section of the collection. However, one poem is credited to him from his time as the heir to Empress Saimei. The preface to the Kaifūsō, a 751 collection of kanshi (Chinese-language poetry from Japan), credits the introduction of the genre to Tenji's political reforms. This collection likely overstates the cultural importance of the Ōmi court.

The Nihon Shoki dedicates far more detail for Tenmu's reign in comparison to that of Tenji; according to one estimate, Tenmu received almost ten times as much coverage. However, Tenji is covered disproportionately often in the chapters on his predecessors. Eighth century chroniclers depicted the Isshi incident and the succeeding Taika Reforms as a monumental event which solidified imperial control across Japan. The historian Herman Ooms describes Tenji as one of the chief initiators of the bureaucratic state under the Ritsuryō system.

== Family ==
Emperor Tenji is recorded to have had nine consorts and fourteen children. Emperor Tenmu took four of his brother's daughters as consorts, and adopted two of Tenji's sons after his death. Some legends claim that Tenmu's first wife, Princess Nukata, was forced to marry Tenji around 660. His consorts and children recorded in the Nihon Shoki were:

- Empress Yamato-hime no Ōkimi, the daughter of Prince Furuhito no Ōji
- Ochi no Iratsume, the daughter of Soga no Ishikawa Maro
  - Prince Takeru
  - Princess Ōta, a consort of Tenmu
  - Princess Uno no Sarara, the chief consort of Tenmu. She later reigned as Empress Jitō and mothered Prince Kusakabe.
- Mei no Iratsume, the daughter of Soga no Ishikawa Maro
  - Princess Minabe
  - Princess Abe, later reigned as Empress Genmei. She mothered Emperor Monmu and Empress Genshō with Prince Kusakabe.
- Tachibana no Iratsume, the daughter of Abe no Kurahashi Maro
  - Princess Asuka
  - Princess Niitabe, a consort of Tenmu.
- Hitachi no Iratsume, the daughter of Soga no Akae
  - Princess Yamanobe
- Shikibuko no Iratsume, a courtier
  - Princess Ōe, a consort of Tenmu.
  - Prince Kawashima, credited with a poem in the Man’yōshū. Later adopted by Tenmu.
  - Princess Izumi
- Kurohime no Iratsume, a courtier
  - Princess Minushi
- Kochi no Michi no Iratsume, a courtier
  - Prince Shiki, later adopted by Tenmu. The father of Emperor Kōnin.
- Yakako no Iratsume, a courtier from Iga Province
  - Prince Ōtomo, born Prince Iga, later served as Emperor Kōbun

Regnal titles
Preceded by Empress Saimei	Emperor of Japan: Tenji; 661–672	Succeeded by Emperor Kōbun
