= Princess Hashihito =

Hashihito

Empress consort of Japan
- Tenure: 645–654
- Died: 665
- Spouse: Emperor Kōtoku
- House: Imperial House of Japan
- Father: Emperor Jomei
- Mother: Empress Kōgyoku

Hashihito (? – 665) was Empress of Japan as the consort of Emperor Kōtoku. Her husband was also her maternal uncle.

She was Emperor Jomei and Empress Kōgyoku's daughter.

== Notes ==
Japanese royalty
Preceded by Princess Takara	Empress consort of Japan; 645–654	Succeeded by Yamato Hime no Ōkimi
