= Emperor Jomei =

Emperor of Japan from 629 to 641

Emperor Jomei 舒明天皇
- Great King of Yamato
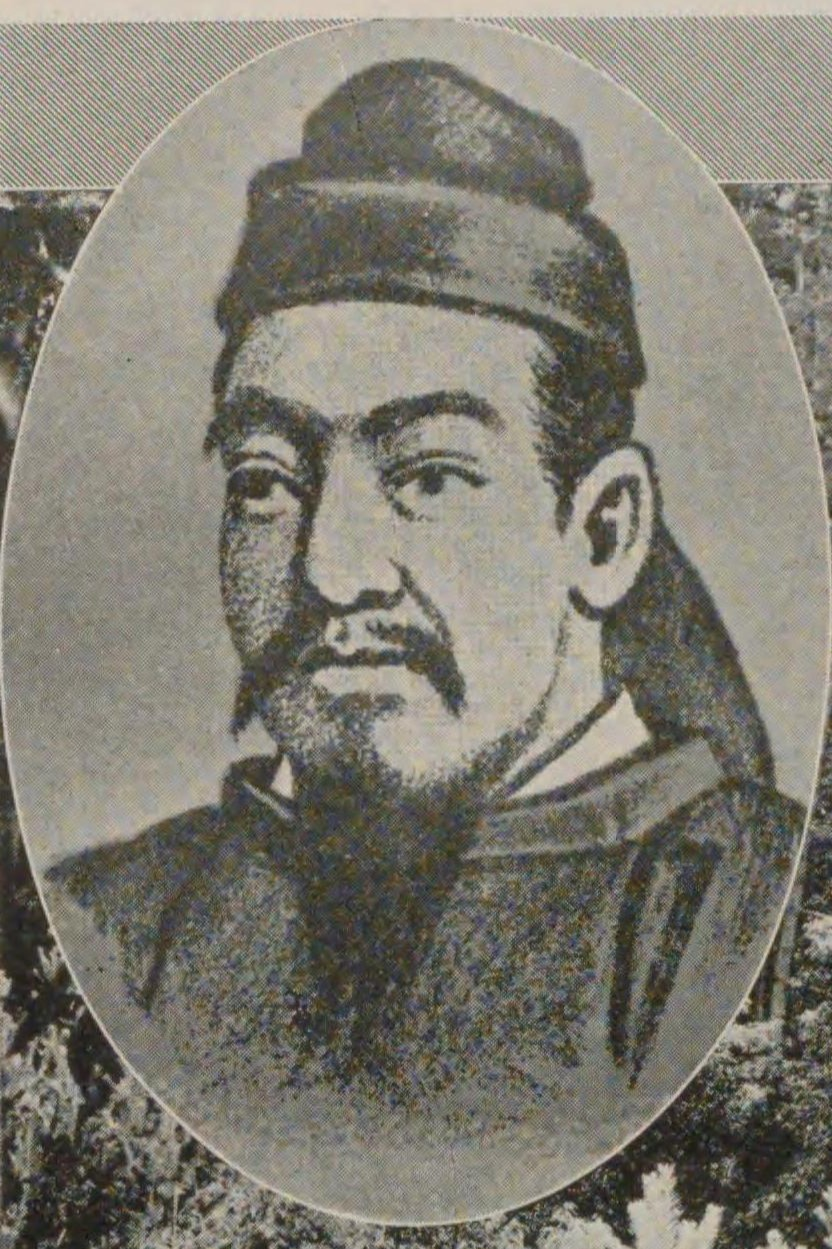

Emperor of Japan
- Reign: 629–641
- Predecessor: Suiko
- Successor: Kōgyoku
- Born: Tamura (田村); April 17, 593
- Died: November 17, 641 (aged 48); Kudara no Miya
- Burial: Osaka no uchi no misasagi (Nara)
- Spouse: Takara (later Empress Kōgyoku)
- Issue: Emperor Tenji; Emperor Tenmu; Princess Hashihito; Prince Furuhito-no-Ōe; Princess Nunoshiki; Princess Oshisaka-no-watamuki; Princess Yata; Prince Kaya
Posthumous name
- Chinese-style shigō: Emperor Jomei (舒明天皇) Japanese-style shigō: Okinagatarashihihironuka no Sumeramikoto (息長足日広額天皇)
- House: Imperial House of Japan
- Father: Prince Oshisako-no-hikohito-no-Ōe
- Mother: Princess Nukate-hime

Emperor Jomei (舒明天皇, Jomei-tennō; April 17, 593 – November 17, 641) was the 34th emperor of Japan, according to the traditional order of succession.

Jomei's reign spanned the years from 629 through 641.

== Traditional narrative ==
Before Jomei's ascension to the Chrysanthemum Throne, his personal name (imina) was Tamura (田村) or Prince Tamura (田村皇子, Tamura-no-Ōji). As emperor, his name would have been Okinagatarashihi Hironuka Sumeramikoto (息長足日広額天皇).

He was a grandson of Emperor Bidatsu, both paternally and maternally. His father was Prince Oshisakanohikohito-no-Ōe, his mother was Princess Nukate-hime, who was a younger sister of his father.

== Events in Jomei's reign ==
He succeeded his great-aunt, Empress Suiko. Suiko did not make it clear who was to succeed her after her death. Before her death in 628, she called Tamura and Prince Shōtoku's son, Prince Yamashiro, and gave some brief advice to each of them. However, it was unclear as to whom she wanted to succeed her. After her death the court was divided into two factions, each supporting one of the princes for the throne. Soga no Emishi, the head of Soga clan, supported Tamura. He claimed that Empress Suiko's last words suggested her desire that Tamura succeed her to the throne. Scholars then construed that the succession (senso) was received by Tamura. Shortly thereafter, he is said to have acceded to the throne (sokui) as Emperor Jomei.

Jomei's contemporary title would not have been tennō, as most historians believe this title was not introduced until the reigns of Emperor Tenmu and Empress Jitō. Rather, it was presumably Sumeramikoto (written the same way as tennō: 天皇) or Amenoshita Shiroshimesu Ōkimi (治天下大王), meaning "the great king who rules all under heaven". Alternatively, Jomei might have been referred to as (ヤマト大王/大君) or the "Great King of Yamato".

Emperor Jomei did not seek to name an heir, and Prince Yamashiro, his political rival, was still alive. In order to ensure peace between Yamashiro and his family, and Jomei's own children, the throne passed to his wife and niece, who became Empress Kōgyoku.

During Emperor Jomei's reign, Soga no Emishi seized several political initiatives. After Jomei's death, the throne was passed to his wife and niece, Empress Kōgyoku, and then to her younger brother, Emperor Kōtoku, after which the throne returned to Kōgyoku again under the name Saimei, before eventually being inherited by two of his sons, Emperor Tenji and Emperor Tenmu.

Emperor Jomei's reign lasted 13 years. In the 13th year of his reign (舒明天皇十三年), he died at the age of 49.

=== Grave ===
The actual site of Jomei's grave is known. The emperor is traditionally venerated at a memorial Shinto shrine (misasagi) located in Sakurai, Nara. The Imperial Household Agency designates this location as Jomei's mausoleum. It is formally named Osaka no uchi no misasagi.

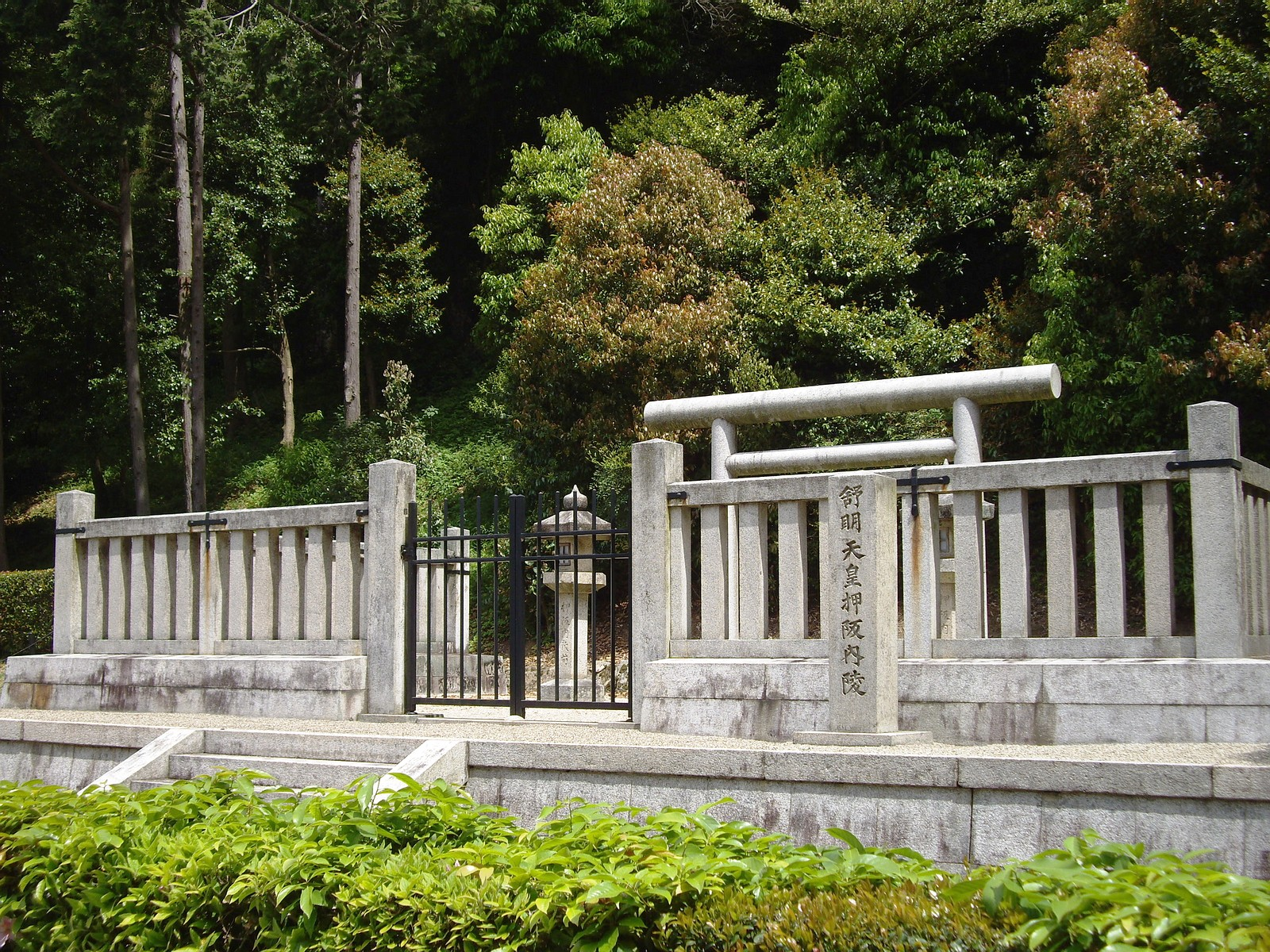
Dannozuka Kofun

It is commonly called Dannozuka Kofun. It is an Octagonal Kofun. It is identified as the tomb of Emperor Jomei by the Imperial Household Agency and of the same form as the attributed tomb of his son. and of his wife Empress Kōgyoku buried in Kengoshizuka Kofun.

=== Poetry ===
The Man'yōshū includes poems attributed to emperors and empresses, including "Climbing Kagu-yama and looking upon the land", which is said to have been composed by Emperor Jomei:

Countless are the mountains in Yamato,
But perfect is the heavenly hill of Kagu;
When I climb it and survey my realm,
Over the wide plain the smoke-wreaths rise and rise,
Over the wide lake the gulls are on the wing;
A beautiful land it is, the land of Yamato!

– Emperor Jomei

== Consorts and children ==
- Consort (Hi): Princess Tame (田眼皇女), Emperor Bidatsu’s daughter
- Empress (Kōgō): Princess Takara (宝皇女) later Empress Kōgyoku, Prince Chinu's daughter (also Prince Oshisaka-no-Hikohito-no-Ōe's grand daughter and Emperor Bidatsu’s great grand daughter)
  - Second Son: Prince Kazuraki/Naka-no-Ōe (葛城/中大兄皇子) later Emperor Tenji
  - Prince Ōama (大海人皇子) later Emperor Tenmu
  - Princess Hashihito (間人皇女, d. 665), Empress Consort of Emperor Kōtoku
- Madame (Bunin): Soga no Hote-no-iratsume (蘇我法提郎女), Soga no Umako’s daughter
  - First Son: Prince Furuhito-no-Ōe (古人大兄皇子) (ca. 612–645)
  - Princess Nunoshiki (布敷皇女)
- Court lady (Uneme): Kaya no Uneme (蚊屋采女), lower court lady from Kaya (蚊屋采女姉子)
  - Prince Kaya (蚊屋皇子)
- Madame (Bunin): Awata no Kagushi-hime (粟田香櫛媛)
  - Princess Oshisaka-no-watamuki (押坂錦向皇女)
- Madame (Bunin): Soga no Tetsuki-no-iratsume (蘇我手杯娘), Soga no Emishi’s daughter
  - Princess Yata (箭田皇女)
- Unknown:
  - Prince Isobe (磯部皇子), founder of Kuge clan

== See also ==
- Emperor of Japan
- List of Emperors of Japan
- Imperial cult

== Notes ==
Regnal titles
Preceded by Empress Suiko	Emperor of Japan: Jomei; 629–641	Succeeded by Empress Kōgyoku
