= Wado =

Wado may refer to:

- WADO, a radio station in New York City
- Wadō (era) (Japanese: 和銅), a Japanese era
- Wadō-ryū (Japanese: 和道流), a style of karate
- Wadokai (Japanese: 和道会), a karate organization
- WADO, part of the DICOMweb standard

== People ==
- Wado, nickname for Eduardo de Pedro (born 1976), Argentine politician
- Wado Siman

== Places ==
- Wadō Archaeological Site
- Wado City, Nigeria
- Wado Station, Miyashiro, Saitama, Japan
