= Prince Kusakabe =

Japanese royalty

- Born: 662
- Died: May 10, 689 (aged 26–27)
- Spouse: Princess Abe (later Empress Genmei)
- Issue: Emperor Monmu; Empress Genshō; Princess Kibi
- House: Kōshitsu
- Father: Emperor Tenmu
- Mother: Empress Jitō

Prince Kusakabe (草壁皇子, Kusakabe no miko; 662 – May 10, 689) was a Japanese imperial crown prince from 681 until his death. He was the second son of Emperor Tenmu. His mother was the empress Unonosarara, today known as Empress Jitō.

Kusakabe was the sole child of his mother. According to Nihon Shoki, in 681 he was appointed the crown prince. In the summer of 686 his father, Emperor Temmu, fell ill and gave the imperial authority to his wife Empress Jitō and the crown prince Kusakabe. After the death of his father, he surprisingly did not ascend to the Chrysanthemum Throne. He led the funeral ceremony and the construction of Emperor Temmu's tomb but before the coronation, he died in 689 at the age of 28. He was posthumously titled Emperor Okanomiyagyou (岡宮御宇天皇, Okanomiyagyou Tennō).

The location of Prince Kusakabe's tomb is uncertain. Some suppose it to be in Takatori, Nara.

Prince Kusakabe married his paternal cousin and maternal aunt, Princess Abe, the daughter of Emperor Tenji. They had at least three children, Prince Karu, Princess Hidaka and Princess Kibi. After his death, his mother Empress Jitō ascended to the throne. Later, Karu and Hidaka reigned as Emperor Monmu and Empress Genshō. Asakura clan claimed to be from his lineage.

== Family ==
Parents

- Father: Emperor Tenmu (天武天皇, c. 631 – 1 October 686)
- Mother: Empress Jitō (持統天皇, 645 – 13 January 703), Emperor Tenji’s daughter
- Wife: Princess Abe/Ahe (阿閇皇女) later Empress Genmei, Emperor Tenji's daughter
  - Princess Hidaka (氷高皇女) later Empress Gensho, first daughter
  - Prince Karu (珂瑠/軽) later Emperor Monmu, first son
  - Daughter: Imperial Princess Kibi (吉備内親王, 686–729), Wife of Prince Nagaya, second daughter

== Ancestry ==
Ancestors of Prince Kusakabe

8. Prince Oshisakanohikohito-no-Ōe
4. Emperor Jomei (593-641)
9. Princess Nukate-hime (c. 570-664)
2. Emperor Tenmu (c. 631-686)
10. Prince Chinu
5. Empress Kōgyoku/Empress Saimei (594-661)
11. Princess Kibitsu-hime (d. 643)
1. Prince Kusakabe
12. Emperor Jomei (593-641)
6. Emperor Tenji (626-672)
13. Empress Kōgyoku/Empress Saimei (594-661)
3. Empress Jitō (645-703)
14. Soga no Kurayamada no Ishikawa no Maro (d. c. 649)
7. Soga no Ochi-no-iratsume (d. c 651)
