= Wadō (era) =

Period of Japanese history (708–715 CE)

Wadō (和銅) was a Japanese era name (年号, nengō; "year name") after Keiun and before Reiki. This period spanned the end of the Asuka period and the beginning of the Nara period: January 708 through September 715. The reigning monarch was Empress Genmei (元明天皇, Genmei-tennō).

== Change of era ==
- 708 Wadō gannen (和銅元年): The new era name Wadō (meaning "Japanese copper") was created because a high-quality copper mine was discovered in Chichibu in Musashi Province, what is now known as Wadō Archaeological Site. The previous era ended and the new one commenced in the spring of Keiun 5, on the 11th day of the 1st month of 708.

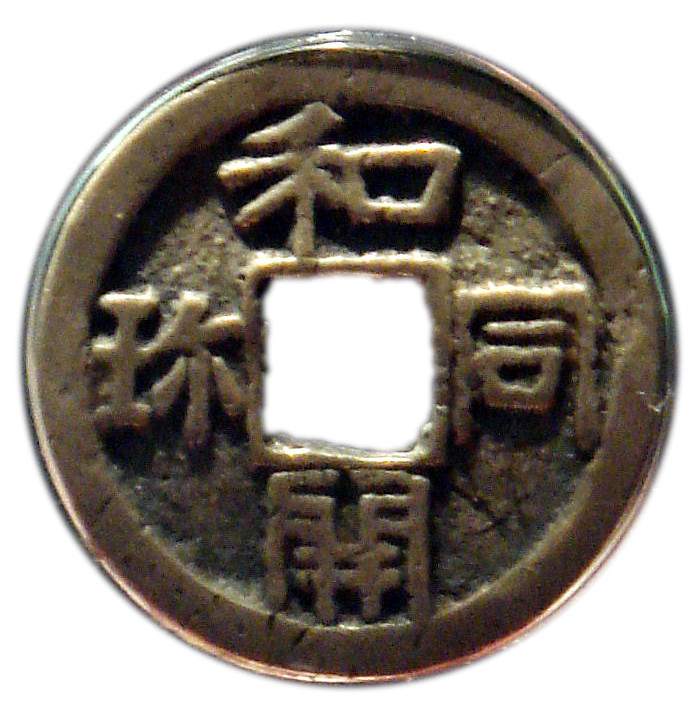
Wadōkaichin (和同開珎) coin, 8th century, Japan.

The Japanese word for copper is dō (銅); and since this was indigenous copper, the "wa" (the ancient Chinese term for Japan) could be combined with the "dō" (copper) to create a new composite term -- "wadō"—meaning "Japanese copper". A mint was established in the province of Ōmi; and the Wadō era is famous for the coin wadōkaihō/wadōkaichin (和同開珎), which is recognized as the first Japanese currency. -- see image of Wadō Kaichin from Japan Mint Museum

== Events of the Wadō era ==
- 5 May 708 (Wadō 1, 11th day of the 4th month): A sample of the newly discovered copper from Musashi was presented in Gemmei's court where it was formally acknowledged as Japanese copper.
- 708 (Wadō 1, 3rd month): Fujiwara no Fuhito (藤原不比等) is named Udaijin (Minister of the Right). Iso-kami Marō is Sadaijin (Minister of the Left).
- 709 (Wadō 2, 3rd month): There was an uprising against governmental authority in Mutsu Province and in Echigo Province. Troops were promptly dispatched to subdue the revolt.
- 709 (Wadō 2, 5th month): Ambassadors arrived from Silla, bringing an offer of tribute. He visited Fujiwara no Fuhito to prepare the way for further visits.
- 710 (Wadō 3, 3rd month): Empress Gemmei established her official residence in Nara, which was known then as Heijō-kyō. In the last years of the Mommu's reign, the extensive preparations for this projected move had begun; but the work could not be completed before the late-emperor's untimely death. Shortly after the nengō was changed to Wadō, an imperial rescript was issued concerning the establishment of a new capital at the Heijō-kyō at Nara in Yamato Province. It had been customary since ancient times for the capital to be moved with the beginning of each new reign. However, Emperor Monmu decided not to move the capital, preferring instead to stay at the Fujiwara Palace which had been established by Empress Jitō.
- 711 (Wadō 5, 1st month, 28th day): Ō no Yasumaro completes the Kojiki
- 712 (Wadō 5): The Mutsu Province was separated from Dewa Province.
- 713 (Wadō 6, 3rd month): Tanba Province was separated from Tango Province; Mimasaka Province was divided from Bizen Province; and Hyūga Province was divided from Ōsumi Province.
- Wadō 6, 5th month, 2nd day (713): imperial decree to compile Fudoki
- 713 (Wadō 6): The road which traverses Mino Province and Shinano Province was widened to accommodate travelers; and the road was widened in the Kiso District of modern Nagano Prefecture.

After Empress Gemmei transferred the seat of her government to Nara, this mountain location remained the capital throughout the succeeding seven reigns. In a sense, the years of the Nara period developed into one of the more significant consequences of her comparatively short reign. After reigning for eight years, Empress Genmei abdicated in favor of her daughter.

== Notes ==
Preceded by Keiun	Era or nengō Wadō; 708–715	Succeeded by Reiki
