= Yōrō =

Period of Japanese history (717–724 CE)

Yōrō (養老) was a Japanese era name (年号, nengō, "year name") after Reiki and before Jinki. This period spanned the years from November 717 through February 724. The reigning empress was Genshō-tennō (元正天皇).

== Change of era ==
- 717 Yōrō gannen (養老元年): The new era name was created to mark an event or series of events. The previous era ended and the new one commenced in Reiki 3, on the 17th day of the 11th month of 717.

== Events of the Yōrō era ==
- 717 (Yōrō 1, 3rd month): The sadaijin Isonokami no Maro died at age 78.
- 717 (Yōrō 1, 9th month): Empress Genshō traveled through Ōmi Province where she was met by the lords of the San'indō, the San'yōdō and the Nankaidō; and she was entertained with singing and dancing. From there, she traveled to Mino Province where the lords of the Tōkaidō, Tōsandō and Hokurikudō who rendered similar honors and entertainments.
- 718 (Yōrō 2): Revisions and commentaries on the Taihō Code are issued; and these changes are collectively known as the Yōrō Code (養老律令, Yōrō-ritsuryō).
- 721 (Yōrō 5, 5th month): The newly completed Nihon Shoki in 30 volumes was offered to the Empress.
- 721 (Yōrō 5, 5th month): The udaijin Fujiwara no Fuhito died at age 62.
- 721 (Yōrō 5, 5th month): The former-Empress Genmei died at age 61.

== Notes ==
Preceded by Reiki	Era or nengō Yōrō; 717–724	Succeeded by Jinki
