= Reiki (era) =

Period of Japanese history (715–717 CE)

Reiki (霊亀) was a Japanese era name (年号, nengō, "year name") after Wadō and before Yōrō. This period spanned the years from September 715 through November 717. The reigning empress was Genshō-tennō (元正天皇).

== Change of era ==
- 715 Reiki gannen (霊亀元年); 715: The new era name was created to mark the beginning of the reign of Empress Genshō. The previous era ended and the new one commenced in Wadō 8 on the 3rd day of the 9th month of 715.

== Events of the Reiki era ==
- 715 (Reiki 1): Empress Gemmei abdicates; and her daughter receives the succession (senso). Shortly thereafter, Empress Genshō formally accedes to the throne (sokui). Emperor Mommu, Genshō's father, had died in 707, but his son (her brother) was deemed too young to receive the succession (senso); and instead, the mother of the male heir formally acceded to the throne (sokui) as Empress Gemmei until her son would grow mature enough to accept senso and sokui. The future Emperor Shōmu's sister undertook a similar responsibility as Empress Genshō. Additional information needed

== Notes ==
Preceded by Wadō	Era or nengō Reiki; 715–717	Succeeded by Yōrō
