= Empress Genshō =

Empress of Japan from 715 to 724

Empress Genshō 元正天皇
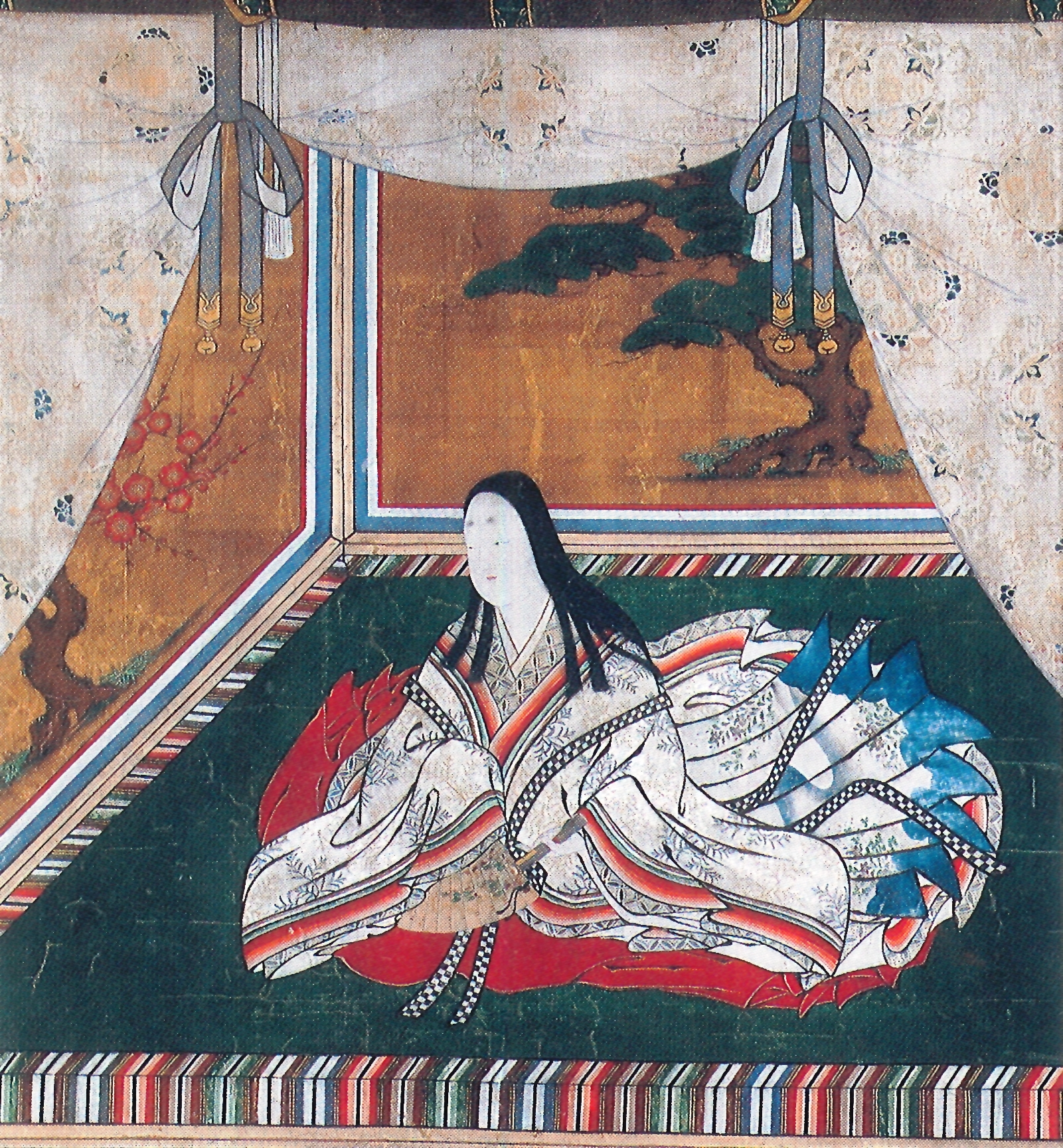
- Portrait of Empress Genshō

Empress of Japan
- Reign: October 3, 715 – March 3, 724
- Predecessor: Genmei
- Successor: Shōmu
- Born: Hidaka (氷高 or 日高), Niinomi (新家); 680; Asuka, Japan
- Died: May 22, 748 (aged 67–68); Nara, Japan
- Burial: Nahoyama no nishi no misasagi (奈保山西陵) (Nara)
Posthumous name
- Chinese-style shigō: Empress Genshō (元正天皇) Japanese-style shigō: Yamato-neko-takamizukiyotarashihime no Sumeramikoto (日本根子高瑞浄足姫天皇)
- House: Imperial House of Japan
- Father: Prince Kusakabe
- Mother: Empress Genmei

Empress Genshō (元正天皇, Genshō-tennō; 680 – May 22, 748) was the 44th monarch of Japan, according to the traditional order of succession. Her reign spanned the years 715 through 724.

Genshō was the fifth of eight women to take on the role of empress regnant, and the only one in the history of Japan to have inherited her title from another empress regnant rather than from a male predecessor. The four female monarchs before Genshō were Suiko, Kōgyoku, Jitō and Genmei; the three reigning after her were Kōken, Meishō, and Go-Sakuramachi.

== Traditional narrative ==
Before her ascension to the Chrysanthemum Throne, her personal name (imina) was Hidaka-hime.

Genshō was an elder sister of Emperor Monmu and daughter of Prince Kusakabe and his wife who later became Empress Genmei. Therefore, she was a granddaughter of Emperor Tenmu and Empress Jitō by her father and a granddaughter of Emperor Tenji through her mother.

=== Events of Genshō's life ===
Empress Genshō's succession to the throne was intended as a regency until Prince Obito, the son of her deceased younger brother Monmu, was mature enough to ascend the throne. Obito would later become the Emperor Shōmu.

Obito was appointed Crown Prince in 714 by Empress Genmei. In the next year, 715, Empress Genmei, then in her fifties, abdicated in favor of her daughter Genshō. Obito was then 14 years old.

- 715 (Reiki 1, 9th month): In the 7th year of Genmei-tennō's reign (元明天皇七年), the empress abdicated; and the succession (senso) was received by her daughter, who held the throne in trust for her younger brother. Shortly thereafter, Empress Genshō acceded to the throne (sokui) as Empress Regnant.

Obito remained the crown prince, heir to the new empress. Fujiwara no Fuhito, the most powerful courtier in Genmei's court, remained at his post until his death in 720. After his death, Prince Nagaya, a grandson of Tenmu and the Empress Genshō's cousin, seized power. This power shift served as a backdrop for later conflicts between Nagaya and Fuhito's four sons during the reign of Emperor Shōmu (formerly Prince Obito).

Under Genshō's reign, the Nihon Shoki was finished in 720. The organization of the law system known as the Ritsuryō was continued under Fuhito's initiatives until his death. These laws and codes were edited and enacted by Fujiwara no Nakamaro, a grandson of Fuhito, and published as Yōrō Code under Fuhito's name. The taxation system introduced by Empress Jitō in the late 7th century began to malfunction. To compensate for the decreased tax revenue, the "Act of possession in three generations", an initiative of Prince Nagaya, was enacted in 723. Under this act, people were allowed to possess a newly cultivated field once every three generations. In the fourth generation, the right of possession would revert to the national government. This act was intended to encourage new cultivation, but it remained in effect for only about 20 years.

Empress Genshō reigned for nine years. Although there were seven other reigning empresses, their successors were most often selected from the patriline of the Imperial bloodline, which is why some conservative scholars argue that the women's reigns were temporary and that the male-only succession tradition must be maintained in the 21st century. Empress Genmei, who was succeeded by her daughter, remains the sole exception to this conventional argument.

In 724, Genshō abdicated in favor of her nephew, who would be known as Emperor Shōmu. Genshō lived for 25 years after she stepped down from the throne. She never married and had no children. She died at age 65.

Empress Genshō's grave is located in Nara. This empress is traditionally venerated at a mausoleum (陵, misasagi), also in Nara. The Imperial Household Agency has designated this location as Monmu's mausoleum, and has been formally named Nahoyama no nishi no misasagi. The Imperial tomb can be visited today in Narazaka-chō, Nara City.

=== Kugyō ===
Kugyō (公卿) is a collective term for the very few most powerful men attached to the court of the Emperor of Japan in pre-Meiji eras.

In general, this elite group included only three to four men at a time. These were hereditary courtiers whose experience and background would have brought them to the pinnacle of a life's career. During Genshō's reign, this apex of the Daijō-kan included:

- Daijō-daijin (Chi-daijō-kanji 知太政官事), Toneri-shinnō (Prince Toneri) (舎人親王). (9th son of Emperor Tenmu) 720–735
- Sadaijin, Isonokami no Maro (石上麻呂). 708–717
- Udaijin, Fujiwara no Fuhito (藤原不比等). 708–720
- Udaijin, Prince Nagaya (長屋王). 721–724
- Dainagon, Abe no Sukunamaro (阿倍宿奈麻呂). 718–720
- Dainagon, Prince Nagaya (長屋王). 718–721
- Dainagon, Tajihi no Ikemori (多治比池守). 721–730

== Eras of Genshō's reign ==
The years of Genshō's reign are more specifically identified by more than one era name or nengō.

- Reiki (715–717)
- Yōrō (717–724)
- Jinki (724–729)

== Genealogy ==
Empress Genshō, born Princess Hidaka (氷高皇女), was the eldest child of Empress Genmei (元明天皇) and her husband, Crown Prince Kusakabe (草壁皇子). She had one younger brother, Prince Karu (珂瑠皇子), later known as Emperor Monmu (文武天皇), and one younger sister, Imperial Princess Kibi (吉備内親王).

Empress Genshō never married or had children. The throne was inherited by her younger brother's son, Emperor Shōmu.

== Ancestry ==
Ancestors of Empress Genshō

8. Emperor Jomei (593–641)
4. Emperor Tenmu (c. 631–686)
9. Empress Kōgyoku/Empress Saimei (594–661)
2. Crown Prince Kusakabe (662–689)
10. Emperor Tenji (626–672)
5. Empress Jitō (645–703)
11. Soga no Ochi-no-iratsume (d. c. 651)
1. Empress Genshō
6. Emperor Tenji (626–672)
3. Empress Genmei (660–721)
14. Soga no Kurayamada no Ishikawa no Maro (d. c. 649)
7. Mei no Iratsume

== See also ==
- Empress of Japan
- Emperor of Japan
  - List of emperors of Japan
- Imperial cult

== Notes ==
Japanese Imperial kamon — a stylized chrysanthemum blossom

Regnal titles
Preceded by Empress Genmei	Empress of Japan: Genshō; 715–724	Succeeded by Emperor Shōmu
