= Princess Abe =

Princess Abe may refer to:

- Empress Genmei
- Empress Kōken
