= Wadō Archaeological Site =

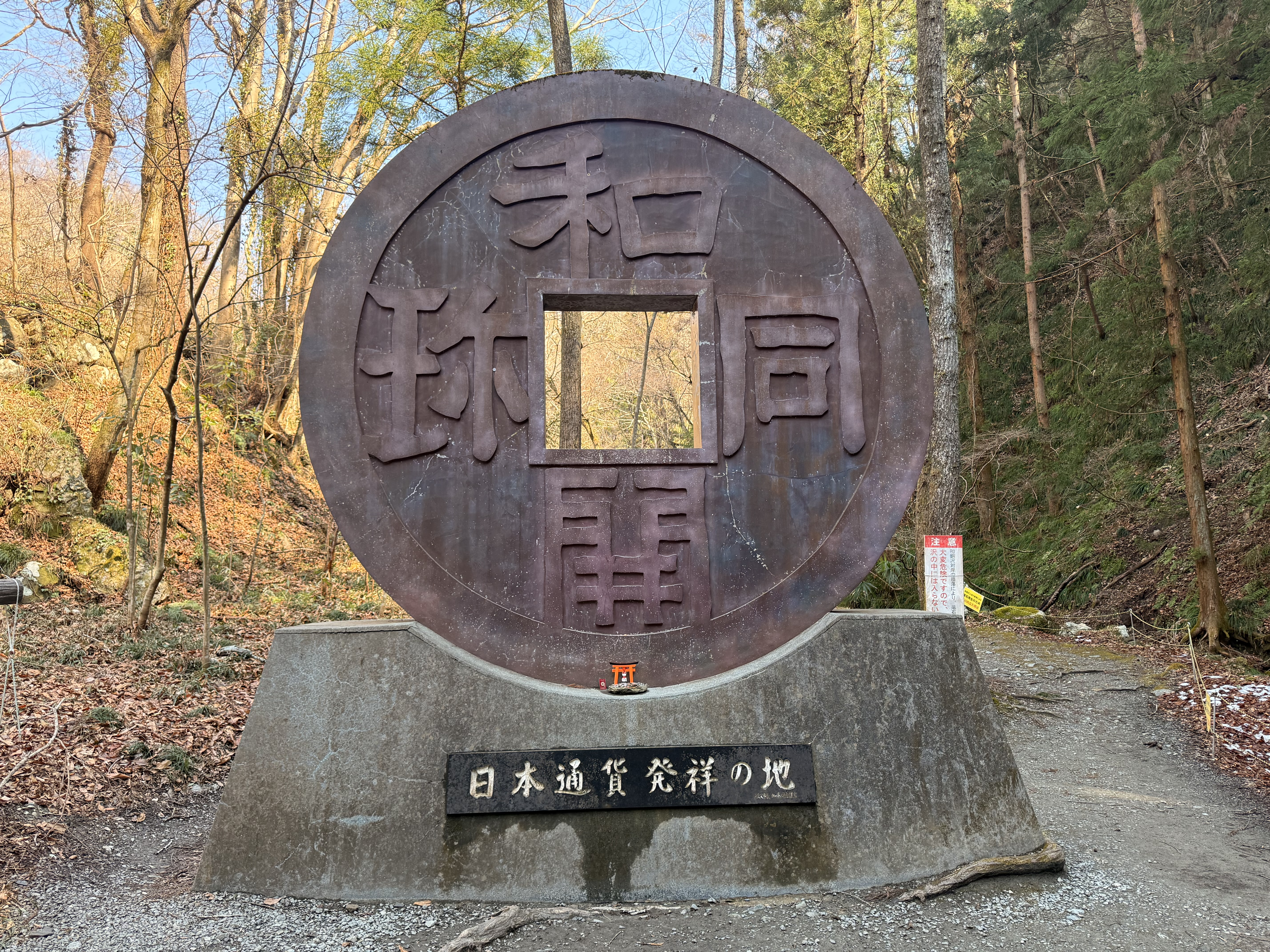
- Interactive map of Wadō Archaeological Site
- Type: Mining site, archaeological site
- Location: Chichibu, Saitama, Japan
- Coordinates: 36°2′52.37″N 139°6′26.29″E
- Built: 708 CE
- Website: City of Chichibu

Wadō Archaeological Site (和銅遺跡 (Wadō Iseki)) is the preserved remains of Japan’s earliest known copper mine, located in Chichibu, Saitama Prefecture. The site is famous for the 708 CE discovery of native copper, which prompted the issuance of Japan’s first official coin, the Wadōkaichin (和同開珎), and the start of the Wadō era.

== History ==
In 708, copper ore was discovered in the region then known as Musashi Province. The finding was reported to Empress Genmei, who celebrated the discovery by naming the era “Wadō” (和銅, “Japanese copper”) and commissioning the minting of Japan's first state-sanctioned coin, the Wadōkaichin.

The copper mined at Wado became a symbol of national prosperity and marked the beginning of a centralized monetary economy in Japan. Mining activity continued intermittently through the Nara and Edo periods and ceased entirely by the late 20th century.

== Archaeological Features ==
The Wado Archaeological Site includes remains of copper mining operations such as shafts, slag deposits, stone markers, and smelting traces. Interpretive signs and monuments have been installed, and nearby shrines and museums commemorate the site’s historical and cultural value.

A large replica of the Wadōkaichin coin stands near the site, and the adjacent Wadō Park offers educational exhibits and nature trails.

== Designation ==
The site is recognized as a historic cultural property by Saitama Prefecture and is preserved as an educational and heritage tourism location. It features prominently in local history education and is a pilgrimage site for those interested in Japanese coinage and early mining history.

== Legacy ==
The name “Wadō” survives in regional place names and historical commemorations. The coin that originated here remains one of Japan’s most iconic artifacts, and replicas are used in talismans for wealth and prosperity.

== See also ==
- Wadōkaichin
- Chichibu
- Empress Genmei
- Mining in Japan
- List of Historic Sites of Japan (Saitama)

== Gallery ==
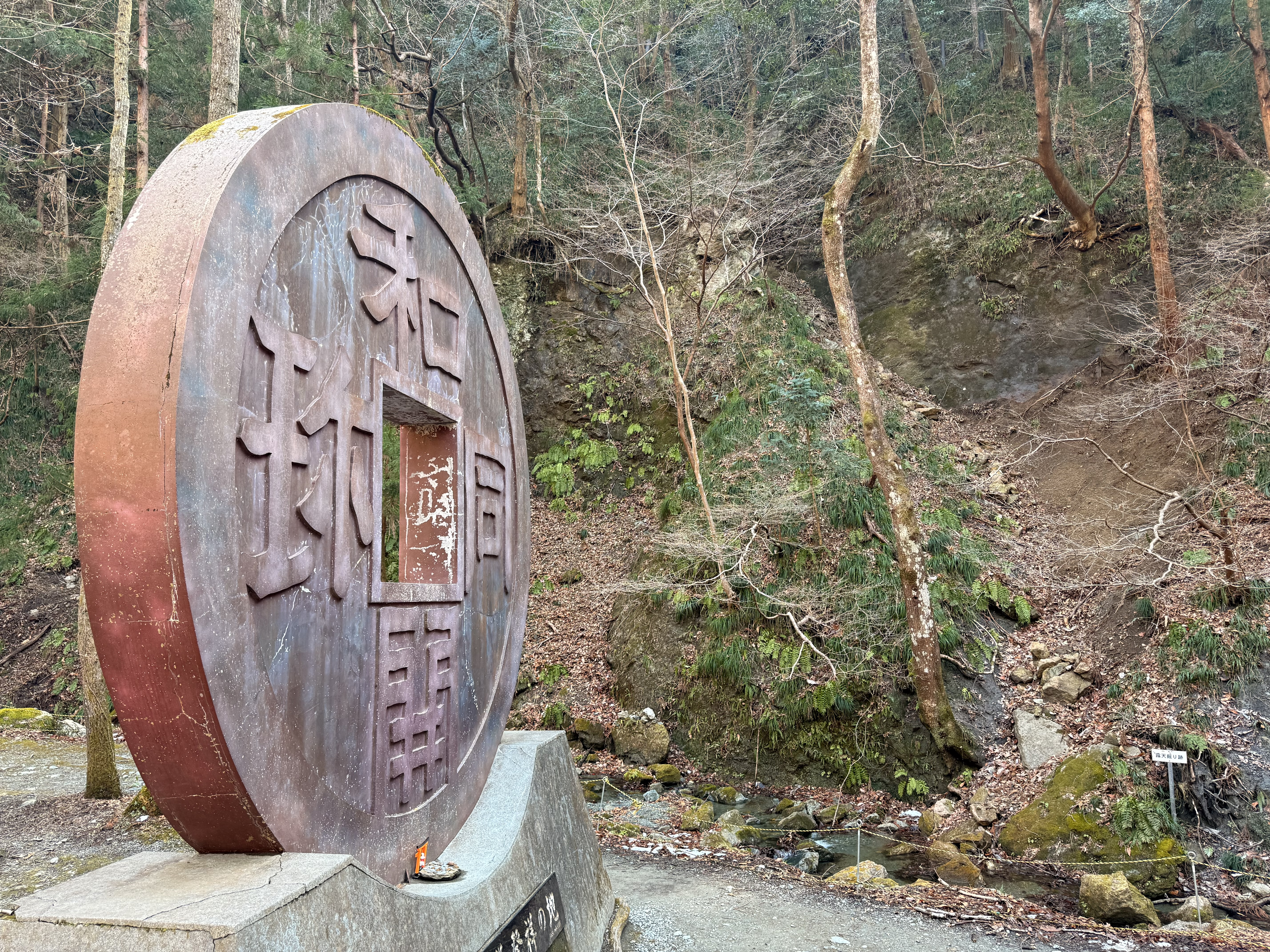
Wadōkaichin Coin Monument with Mine Area

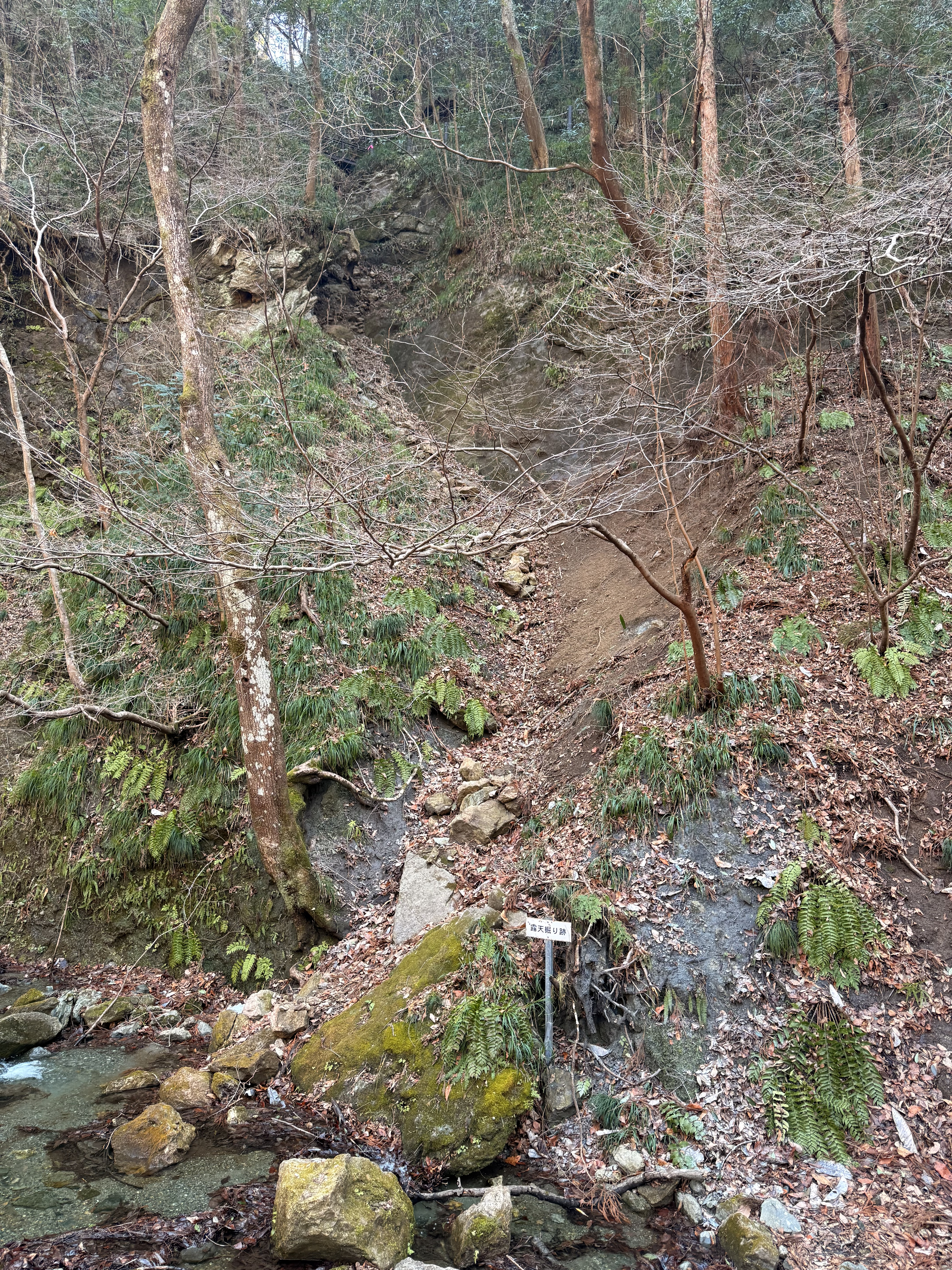
Copper Mine Site

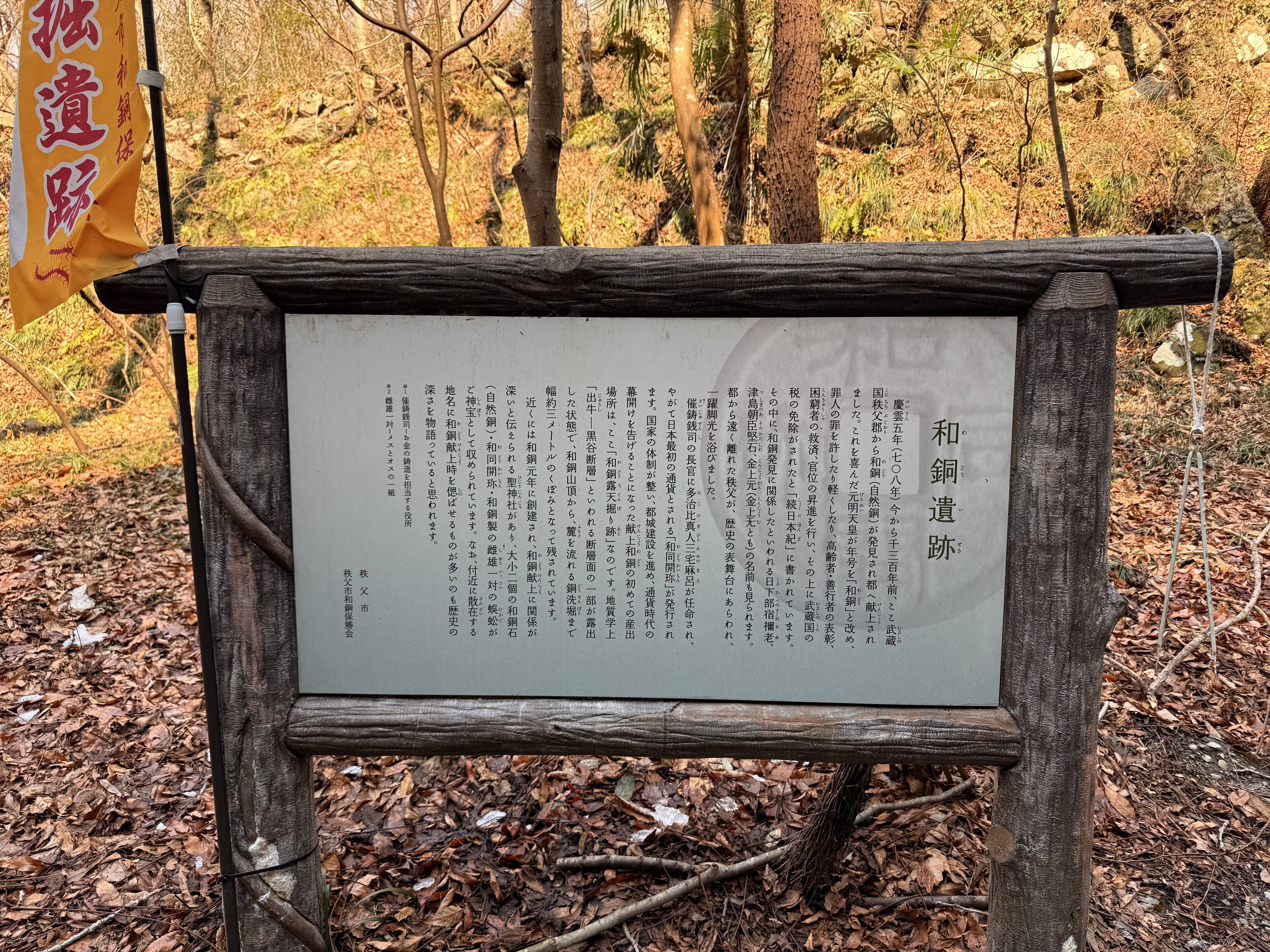
Copper Mine Site Descriptive Sign

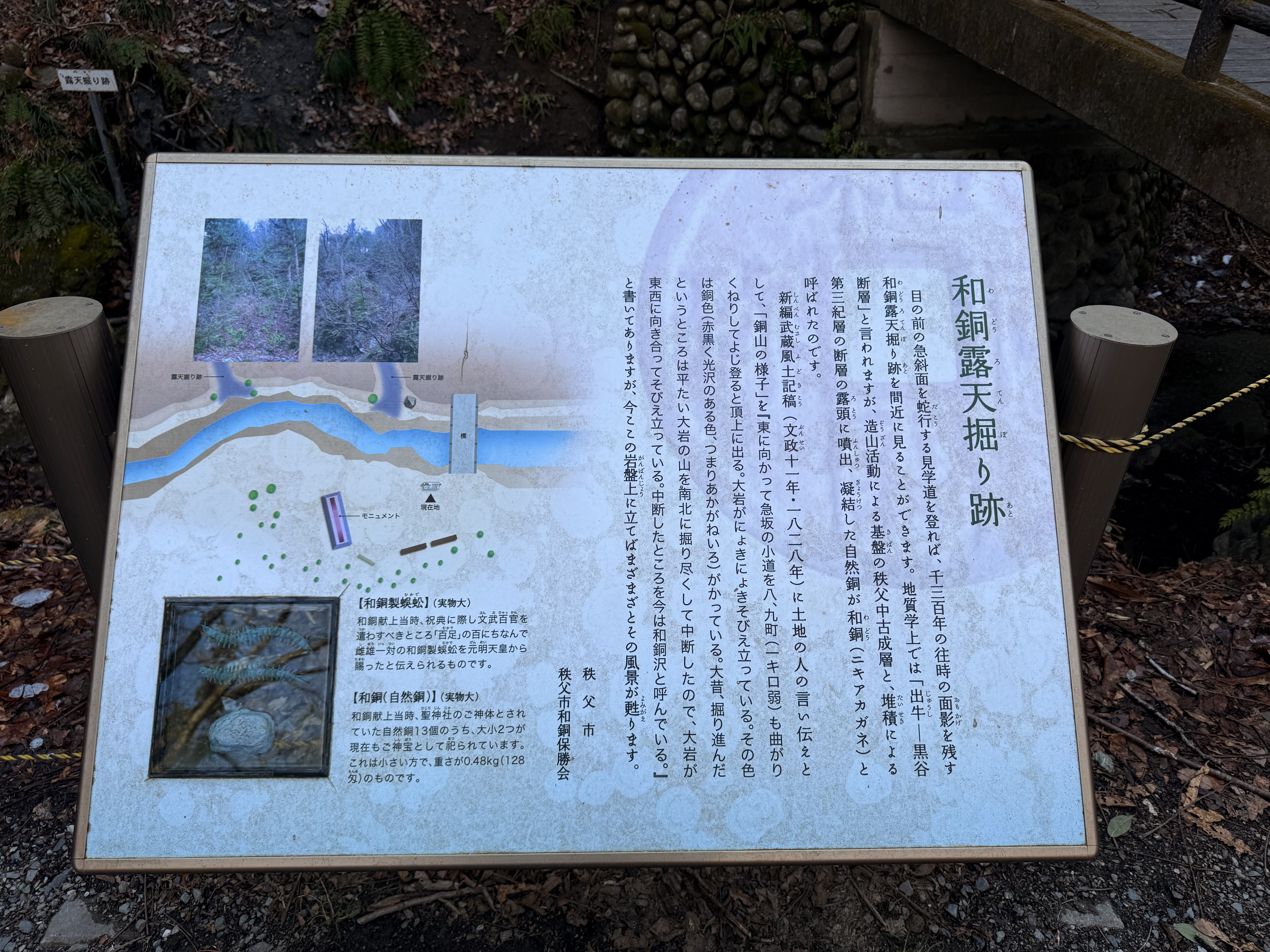
Descriptive Sign With Map

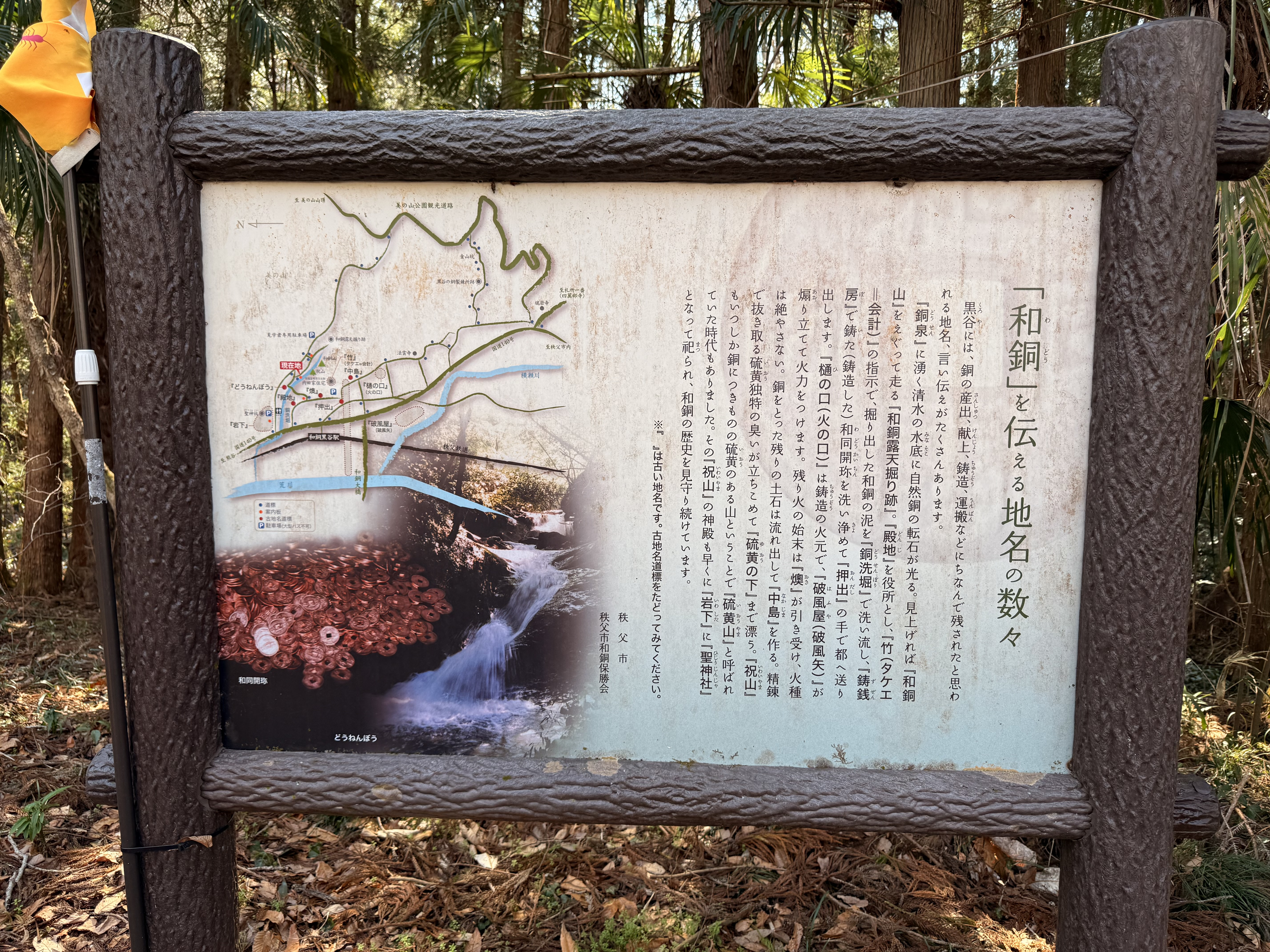
Descriptive Sign With Photo

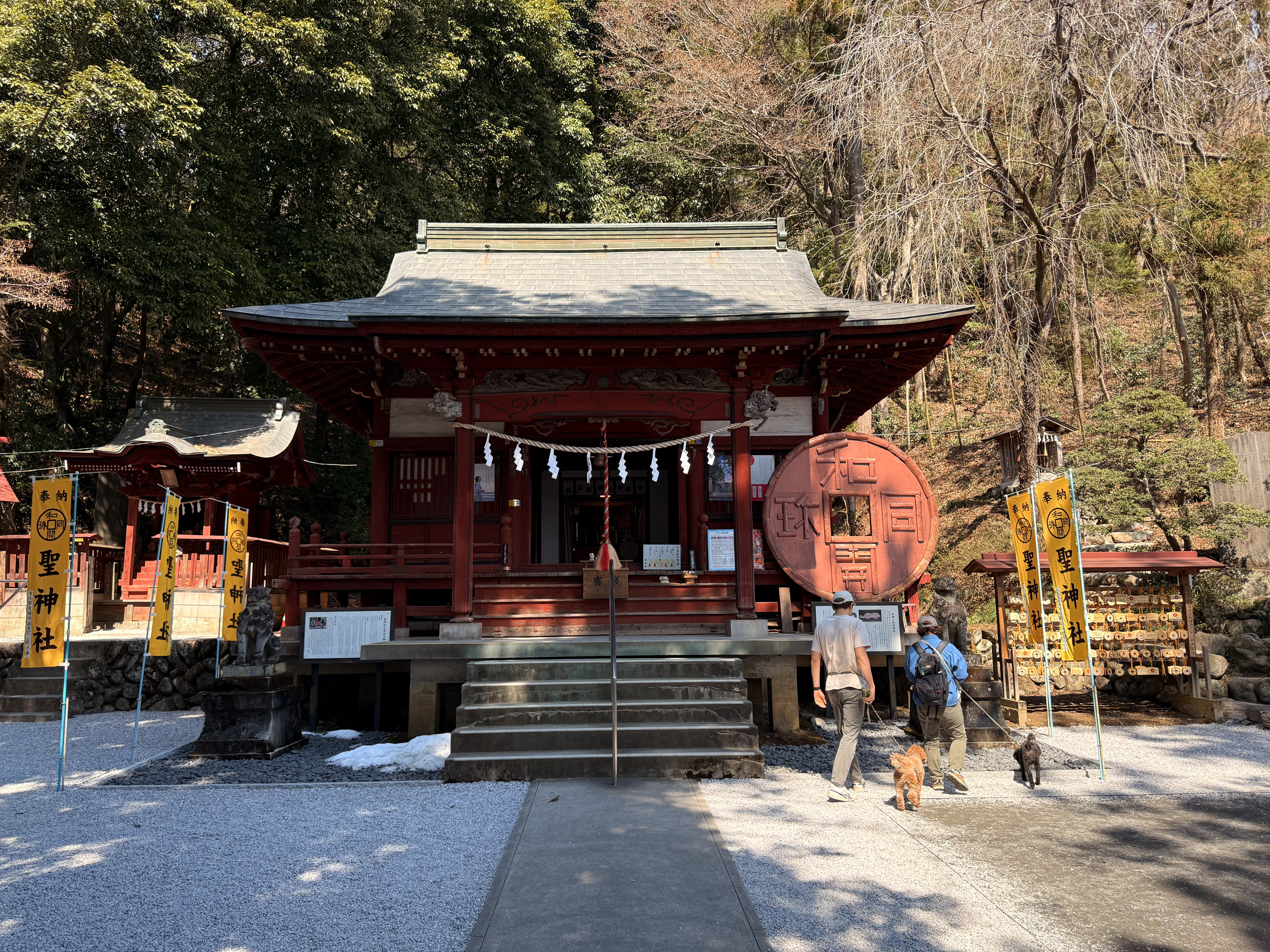
Hijiri Jinja Shrine

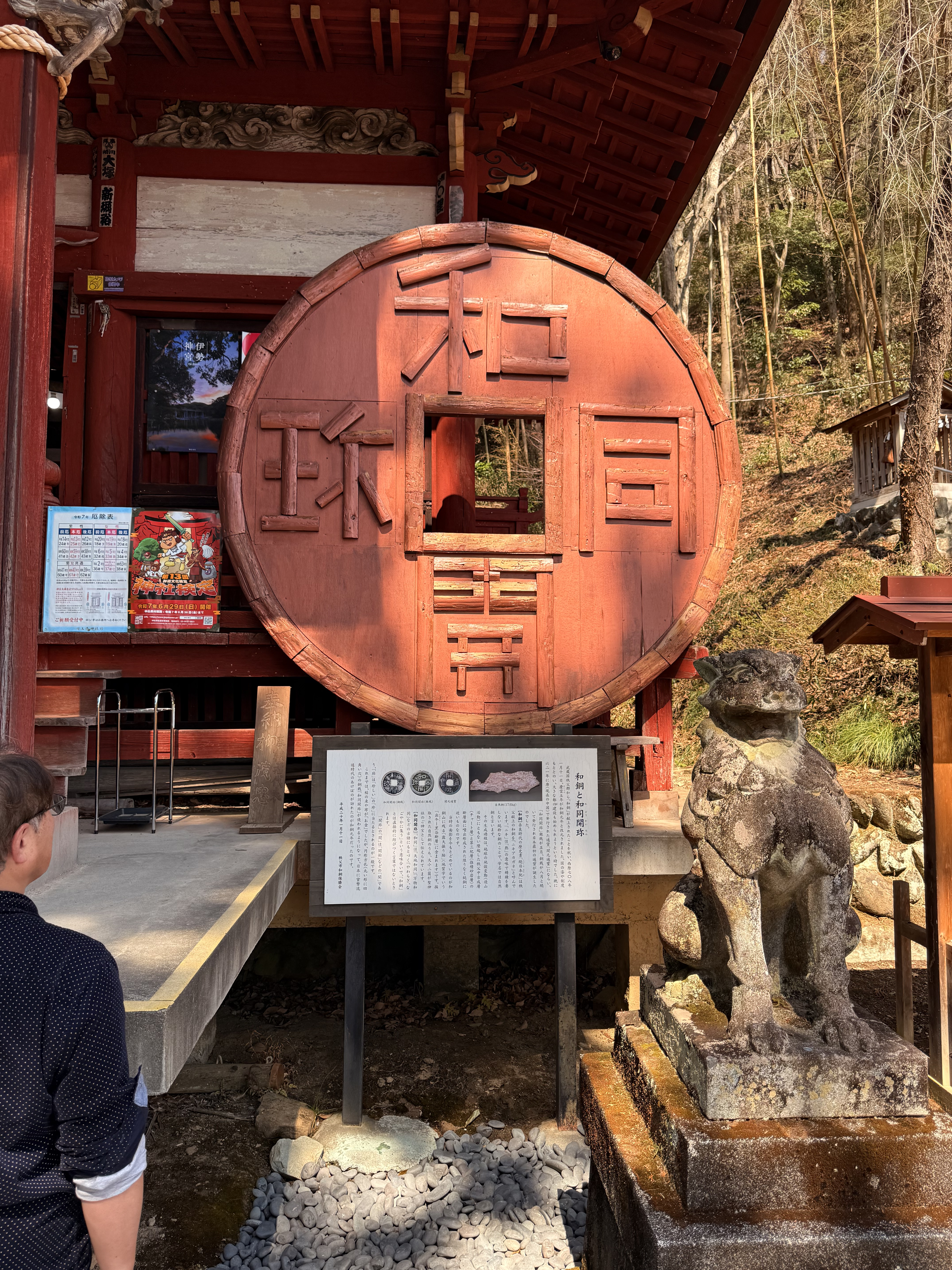
Wadōkaichin with Descriptive Sign
