= Wado City =

- Interactive map of Wado City

Wado City (Orere Urhobo) is the proposed name of the biggest urban, commercial and industrial area in Urhobo territories of Delta State, Nigeria. It shares boundaries with Warri North and Warri South West.

On 23 August 2021 Dr. Ejiro Imuere made the proposal to establish Wado City on Facebook in order to reflect the identity of the Urhobo people in Warri South Local Government Area and to correct the error of subsuming neighbouring Urhobo towns by the name "Warri". Thereafter Wado City became a topic in several social media platforms (mostly Facebook) and blogs.

On 1 October 2021 the committee in charge of the actualization of Wado City held its first physical general meeting to mark Nigeria's Independence Day, where Dr Ejiro Imuere clarified the necessity for Wado City to actualize nonviolent ideology and to discuss the way forward to promoting a long lasting peaceful coexistence between Warri and Wado City and viable ways to attract investors to Wado City.

Project Wado City

Wado city started a project of making Urhobo kings portraits, that will be place in every organization in the kingdom, they started with the king of Udjerhe Kingdom in the year 2025. Currently now they working on other Kingdom that will be made public soon.

KINGDOMS IN PROPOSED WADOCITY IN DELTA STATE.

The 24 Urhobo Kingdoms and Their Traditional Rulers.

1. Agbarha-Ame (Agbarha-Warri) Kingdom — Ruled by the Ovie (HRM King Emem Emmanuel Onovughe, Ataneru Igbi II)
2. Agbarha-Otor Kingdom — Ruled by the Ovie (HRM Richard Ogheneovo Ebikienemu, Owoso II)
3. Agbarho Kingdom — Ruled by the Osuivie (HRM Samson Ogugu I)
4. Agbon Kingdom — Ruled by the Ovie / Ogurimerime (HRM Ukori I)
5. Arhavwarien Kingdom — Ruled by the Ovie
6. Effurun-Otor Kingdom — Ruled by the Orovworere
7. Evwreni Kingdom — Ruled by the Ovie
8. Ewu Kingdom — Ruled by the Ovie
9. Idjerhe Kingdom — Ruled by the Ovie (HRM Obukohwo Whiskey)
10. Mosogar Kingdom — Ruled by the Ovie (HRM Ukori Peter)
11. Oghara Kingdom — Ruled by the Ovie (HRM Noble Eshemitan, Ukori I
12. Okere-Urhobo Kingdom — Ruled by the Orosuen (HRM Prof. Paul O. Okumagba, Idama II)
13. Okparabe Kingdom — Ruled by the Ovie
14. Okpe Kingdom — Ruled by the Orodje (HRM Major Gen. Felix Mujakperuo, Orhue I)
15. Olomu Kingdom — Ruled by the Ohworode
16. Orogun Kingdom — Ruled by the Okpara-Uku
17. Oruarivie-Abraka Kingdom — Ruled by the Ovie
18. Udu Kingdom — Ruled by the Ovie (HRM Eireefe Adefesiri, Owhorhu I)
19. Ughelli Kingdom — Ruled by the Ovie (HRM Wilson Ojakovo Oharisi III)
20. Ughievwen Kingdom — Ruled by the Okobaro (HRM Mathew Egbi, Owawha II)
21. Umiaghwa-Abraka Kingdom — Ruled by the Ovie
22. Uvwie Kingdom — Ruled by the Ovie (HRM Emmanuel Ekemejewa Sideso, Abe I)
23. Uwheru Kingdom — Ruled by the Odion Rode
