= Empress Jitō =

Empress of Japan from 686 to 697

Empress Jitō 持統天皇
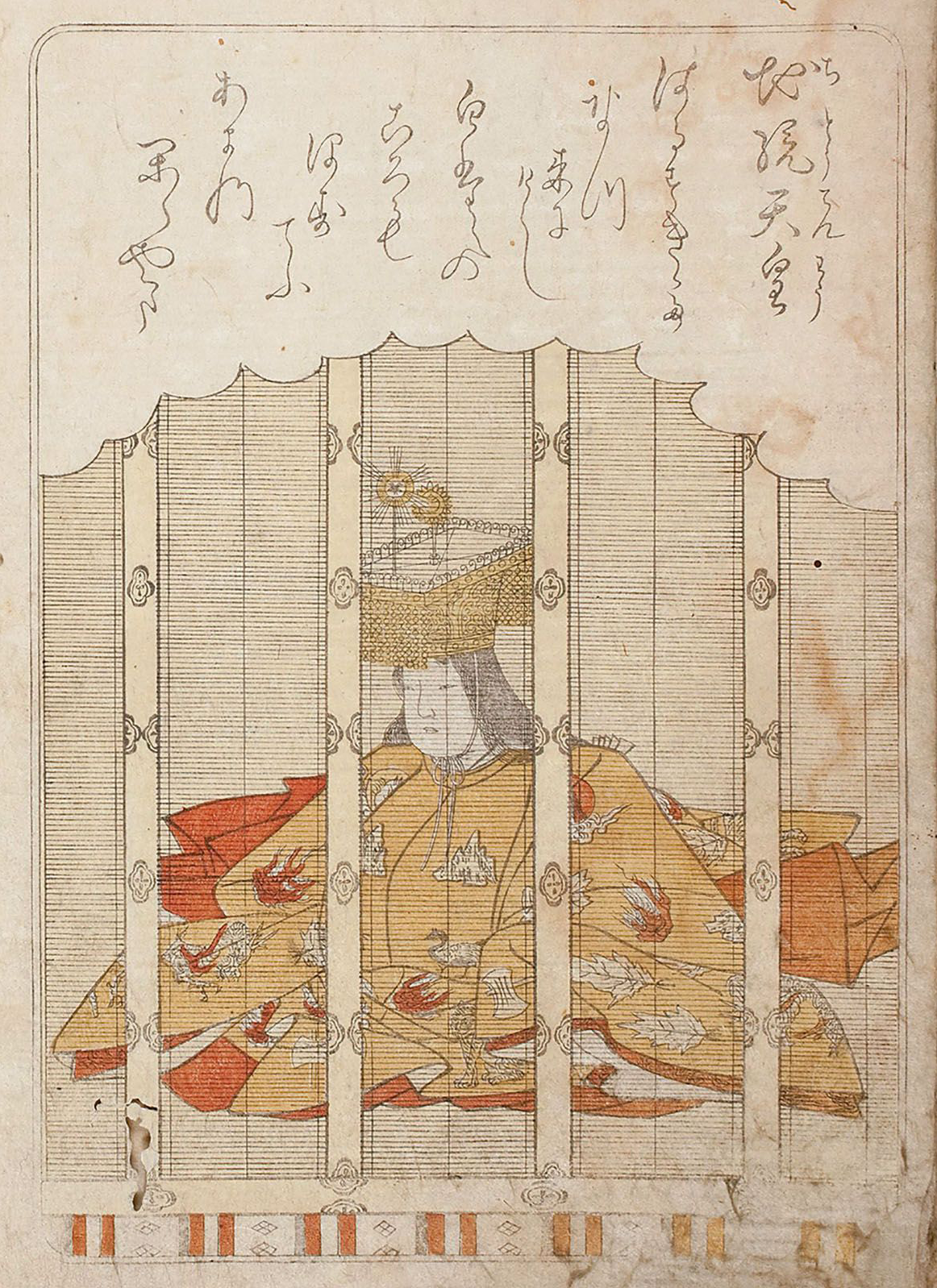
- Portrait of Empress Jitō by Katsukawa Shunshō, 18th century

Empress of Japan
- Reign: 686–697
- Predecessor: Tenmu
- Successor: Monmu

Empress consort of Japan
- Tenure: 673–686
- Born: Uno-no-sarara (鸕野讚良); 645; Japan
- Died: January 13, 703 (aged 57–58); Fujiwara-kyō, Japan
- Burial: Hinokuma-no-Ōuchi no misasagi (檜隈大内陵) (Nara)
- Spouse: Emperor Tenmu
- Issue: Prince Kusakabe
Posthumous name
- Chinese-style shigō: Empress Jitō (持統天皇) Japanese-style shigō: Takamanoharahiro-no-hime no Sumeramikoto (高天原広野姫天皇)
- House: Imperial House of Japan
- Father: Emperor Tenji
- Mother: Soga no Ochi-no-iratsume

Empress Jitō (持統天皇, Jitō-tennō; 645 – January 13, 703) was the 41st monarch of Japan, according to the traditional order of succession.

Jitō's reign spanned the years from 686 through 697.

In the history of Japan, Jitō was the third of eight women to take on the role of empress regnant. The two female monarchs before Jitō were Suiko and Kōgyoku/Saimei. The five women sovereigns reigning after Jitō were Genmei, Genshō, Kōken/Shōtoku, Meishō, and Go-Sakuramachi.

== Traditional narrative ==
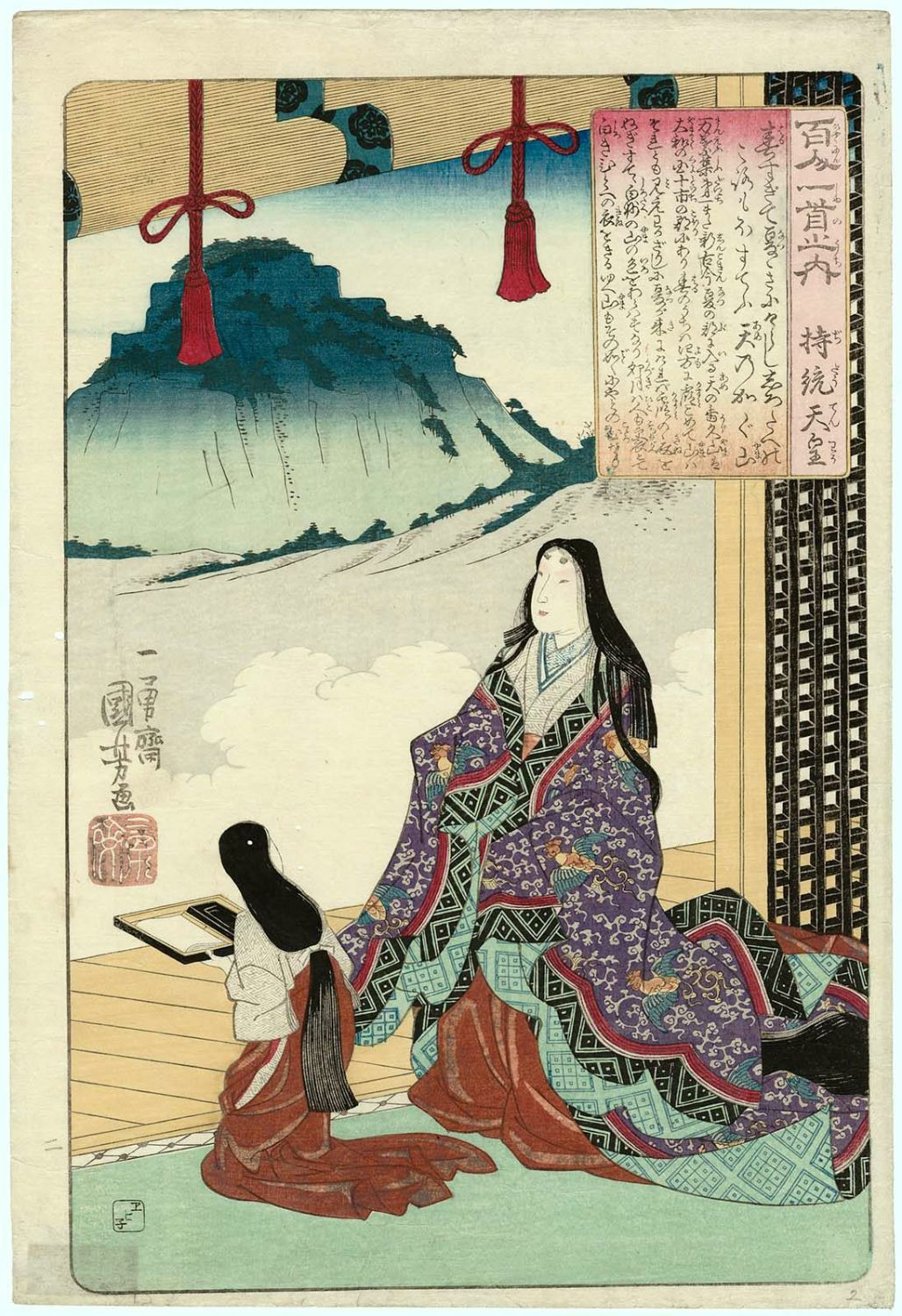
Illustrated poem by Empress Jitō

Empress Jitō was the daughter of Emperor Tenji. Her mother was Ochi-no-Iratsume, the daughter of Minister Ō-omi Soga no Yamada-no Ishikawa Maro. She was the wife of Tenji's full brother Emperor Tenmu, whom she succeeded on the throne.

Empress Jitō's given name was Unonosarara or Unonosasara (鸕野讚良), or alternatively Uno.

=== Events of Jitō's reign ===
Jitō took responsibility for court administration after the death of her husband, Emperor Tenmu, who was also her uncle. She acceded to the throne in 687 in order to ensure the eventual succession of her son, Kusakabe-shinnō. Throughout this period, Empress Jitō ruled from the Fujiwara Palace in Yamato. In 689, Jitō prohibited Sugoroku, in 690 at enthronement she performed special ritual then gave pardon and in 692 she travelled to Ise against the counsel of minister Miwa-no-Asono-Takechimaro.

Prince Kusakabe was named as crown prince to succeed Jitō, but he died at a young age. Kusakabe's son, Karu-no-o, was then named as Jitō's successor. He eventually would become known as Emperor Monmu.

Empress Jitō reigned for eleven years. Although there were seven other reigning empresses, their successors were most often selected from amongst the males of the paternal Imperial bloodline, which is why some conservative scholars argue that the women's reigns were temporary and that male-only succession tradition must be maintained in the 21st century. Empress Genmei, who was followed on the throne by her daughter, Empress Genshō, remains the sole exception to this conventional argument.

In 697, Jitō abdicated in Monmu's favor; and as a retired sovereign, she took the post-reign title daijō-tennō. After this, her imperial successors who retired took the same title after abdication.

Jitō continued to hold power as a cloistered ruler, which became a persistent trend in Japanese politics.

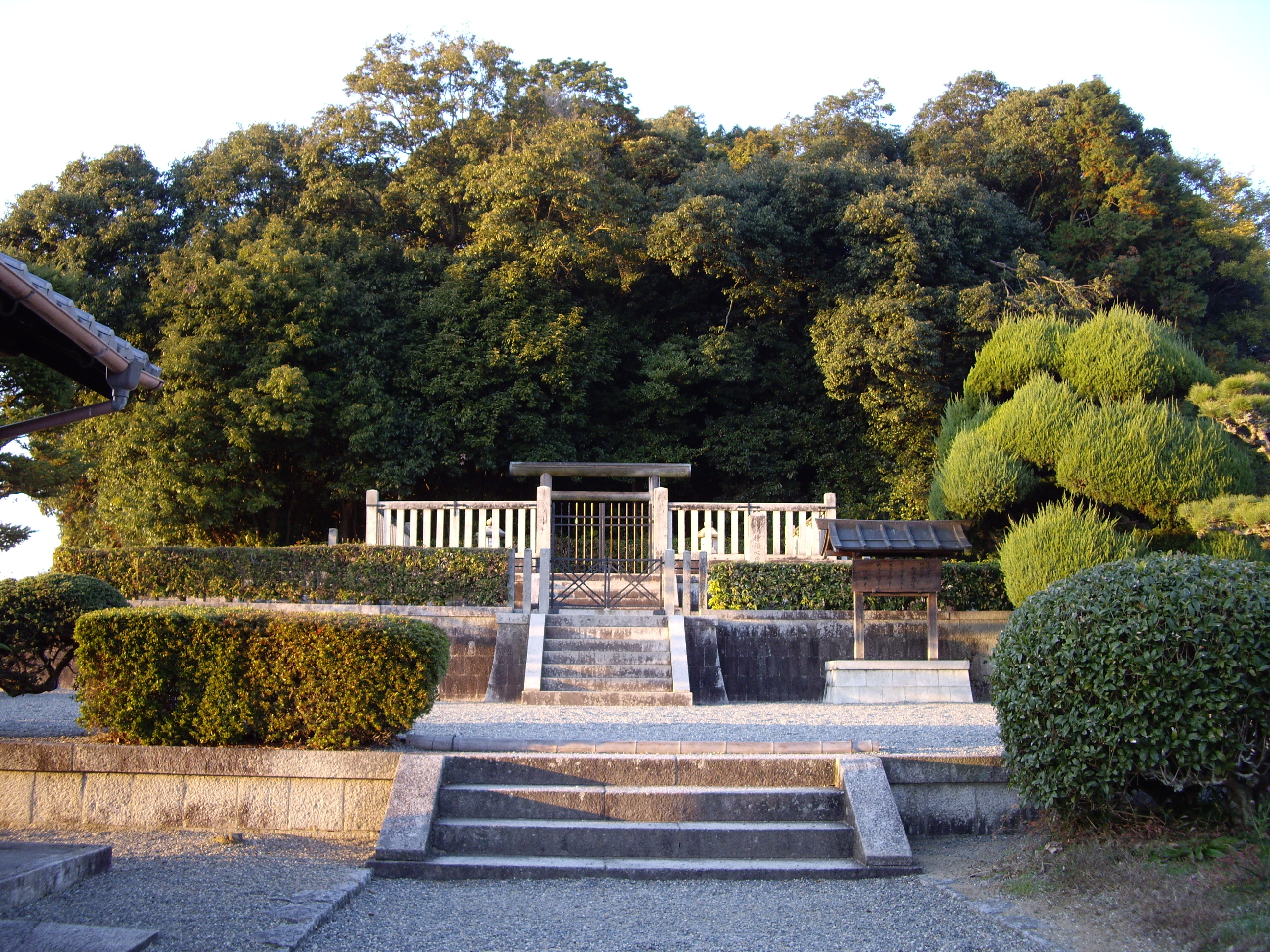
Memorial Shinto shrine and mausoleum honoring Empress Jitō

The actual site of Jitō's grave is known. This empress is traditionally venerated at a memorial Shinto shrine (misasagi) at Nara.

The Imperial Household Agency designates this location as Jitō's mausoleum. It is formally named Ochi-no-Okanoe no misasagi.

=== Kugyō ===
Kugyō (公卿) is a collective term for the very few most powerful men attached to the court of the Emperor of Japan in pre-Meiji eras.

In general, this elite group included only three to four men at a time. These were hereditary courtiers whose experience and background would have brought them to the pinnacle of a life's career. During Jitō's reign, this apex of the Daijō-kan included:

- Daijō-daijin, Takechi-shinnō (the 3rd son of Emperor Tenmu)
- Sadaijin
- Udaijin
- Naidaijin

== Non-nengō period ==
Jitō's reign is not linked by scholars to any era or nengō. The Taika era innovation of naming time periods – nengō – languished until Mommu reasserted an imperial right by proclaiming the commencement of Taihō in 701.

- See Japanese era name – "Non-nengo periods"
- See Jitō period (687–697).

However, Brown and Ishida's translation of Gukanshō offers an explanation which muddies a sense of easy clarity:

The eras that fell in this reign were: (1) the remaining seven years of Shuchō [(686+7=692?)]; and (2) Taika, which was four years long [695–698]. (The first year of this era was kinoto-hitsuji [695].) ... In the third year of the Taka era [697], Empress Jitō yielded the throne to the Crown Prince.

== Family ==
Empress Jitō, known as Princess Uno-no-sarara (鸕野讃良皇女) in her early days, was born to Emperor Tenji and his concubine, who held of Beauty (Hin).She had two full siblings: Princess Ōta and Prince Takeru. Empress Jitō and her younger sister, Princess Ōta, shared the same husband, Emperor Tenmu, with whom both had children.

- Husband: Emperor Tenmu (天武天皇, Tenmu tennō, c. 631 – October 1, 686), son of Emperor Jomei and Empress Kōgyoku
  - Son: Crown Prince Kusakabe (草壁皇子, 662 – May 10, 689)

== Poetry ==
The Man'yōshū includes poems said to have been composed by Jitō. This one was composed after the death of the Emperor Tenmu:

Japanese
Rōmaji
English

やすみしし 我が大君の
夕されば 見したまふらし
明け来れば 問ひたまふらし
神岳の 山の黄葉を
今日もかも 問ひたまはまし
明日もかも 見したまはまし
その山を 振り放け見つつ
夕されば あやに悲しみ
明け来れば
うらさび暮らし
荒栲の
衣の袖は
干る時もなし

Yasumishishi waga ōkimi no
Yū sareba meshita furashi
Akekureba toita furashi
Kamuoka no yama no momichi to
Kyō mo ka mo toita mawamashi
Asu mo ka mo meshita mawamashi
Sono yama o furisakemitsutsu
Yū sareba aya ni kanashimi
Akekureba
Urasabikurashi
Aratae no
Koromo no sode wa
Furu toki mo nashi

Oh, the autumn foliage
Of the hill of Kamioka!
My good Lord and Sovereign
Would see it in the evening
And ask of it in the morning.
On that very hill from afar
I gaze, wondering
If he sees it to-day,
Or asks of it to-morrow.
Sadness I feel at eve,
And heart-rending grief at morn—
The sleeves of my coarse-cloth robe
Are never for a moment dry.

One of the poems attributed to Empress Jitō was selected by Fujiwara no Teika for inclusion in the very popular anthology Hyakunin Isshu:

Japanese
Rōmaji
English

春過ぎて
夏来にけらし
白妙の
衣干すてふ
天の香具山

Haru sugite
Natsu kinikerashi
Shirotae no
Koromo hosu chō
Ama no Kaguyama

The spring has passed
And the summer come again
For the silk-white robes
So they say, are spread to dry
On Mount Kaguyama

== See also ==
- Empress of Japan
- Emperor of Japan
  - List of emperors of Japan
- Imperial cult

== Notes ==
Japanese Imperial kamon — a stylized chrysanthemum blossom

Regnal titles
Preceded by Emperor Tenmu	Empress of Japan: Jitō; 686–697	Succeeded by Emperor Monmu
Royal titles
Preceded by Yamato Hime no Ōkimi	Empress consort of Japan; 673–686	Succeeded by Fujiwara Asukabehime
