= Empress Genmei =

Empress of Japan from 707 to 715

Empress Genmei 元明天皇
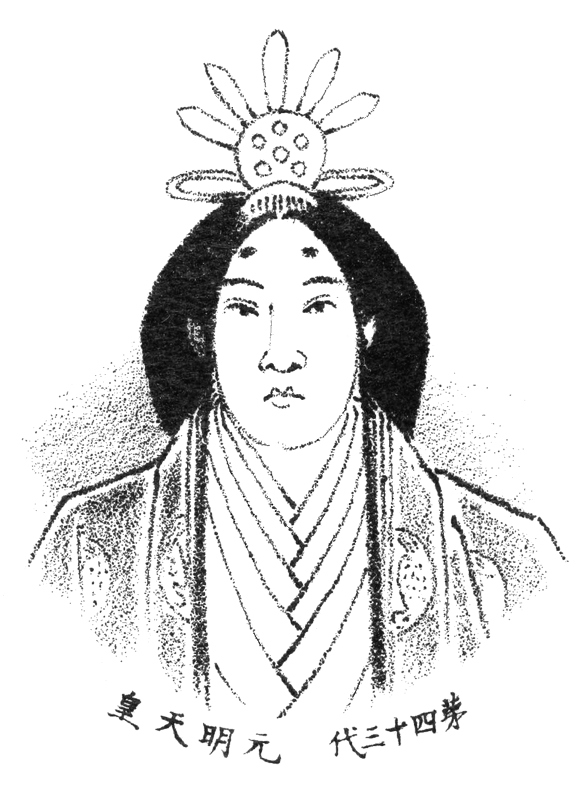

Empress of Japan
- Reign: August 18, 707 – October 3, 715
- Predecessor: Monmu
- Successor: Genshō
- Born: Ahe (阿閇 or 阿部); April 20, 660
- Died: December 29, 721 (aged 61); Nara, Japan
- Burial: Nahoyama no higashi no misasagi (奈保山東陵) (Nara)
- Spouse: Prince Kusakabe
- Issue: Emperor Monmu; Empress Genshō; Princess Kibi
Posthumous name
- Chinese-style shigō: Empress Genmei (元明天皇) Japanese-style shigō: Yamato-neko-amatsumiyo-toyokuni-narihime no Sumeramikoto (日本根子天津御代豊国成姫天皇)
- House: Imperial House of Japan
- Father: Emperor Tenji
- Mother: Soga no Mei-no-iratsume

Empress Genmei (元明天皇, Genmei-tennō; April 20, 660 – December 29, 721), also known as Empress Genmyō, was the 43rd monarch of Japan, according to the traditional order of succession. Genmei's reign spanned the years 707 through 715. She established the capital at Heijō-kyō in 710, marking the beginning of the Nara period.

In the history of Japan, Genmei was the fourth of eight women to take on the role of empress regnant. The three female monarchs before Genmei were Suiko, Kōgyoku/Saimei, and Jitō. The four women sovereigns reigning after Genmei were Genshō, Kōken/Shōtoku, Meishō, and Go-Sakuramachi.

== Traditional narrative ==
Before her ascension to the Chrysanthemum Throne, her personal name (imina) was Abe-hime.

Empress Genmei was the fourth daughter of Emperor Tenji; and she was a younger sister of Empress Jitō by a different mother. Her mother, Mei-no-Iratsume (also known as Soga-hime), was a daughter of Udaijin Soga-no-Kura-no-Yamada-no-Ishikawa-no-Maro (also known as Soga Yamada-no Ō-omi).

=== Events of Genmei's life ===
Genmei became the consort (nyōgo) of Crown Prince Kusakabe no Miko, who was the son of Emperor Tenmu and Empress Jitō. After the death of their son Emperor Monmu in 707, she acceded to the throne. At least one account suggests that she accepted the role of empress because Emperor Monmu felt his young son, her grandson, was still too young to withstand the pressures which attend becoming emperor.

- July 18, 707 (Keiun 4, 15th day of the 6th month): In the 11th year of Monmu-tennō's reign (文武天皇十一年), the emperor died; and the succession (senso) was received by the emperor's mother, who held the throne in trust for her young grandson. Shortly thereafter, Empress Genmei is said to have acceded to the throne (sokui).

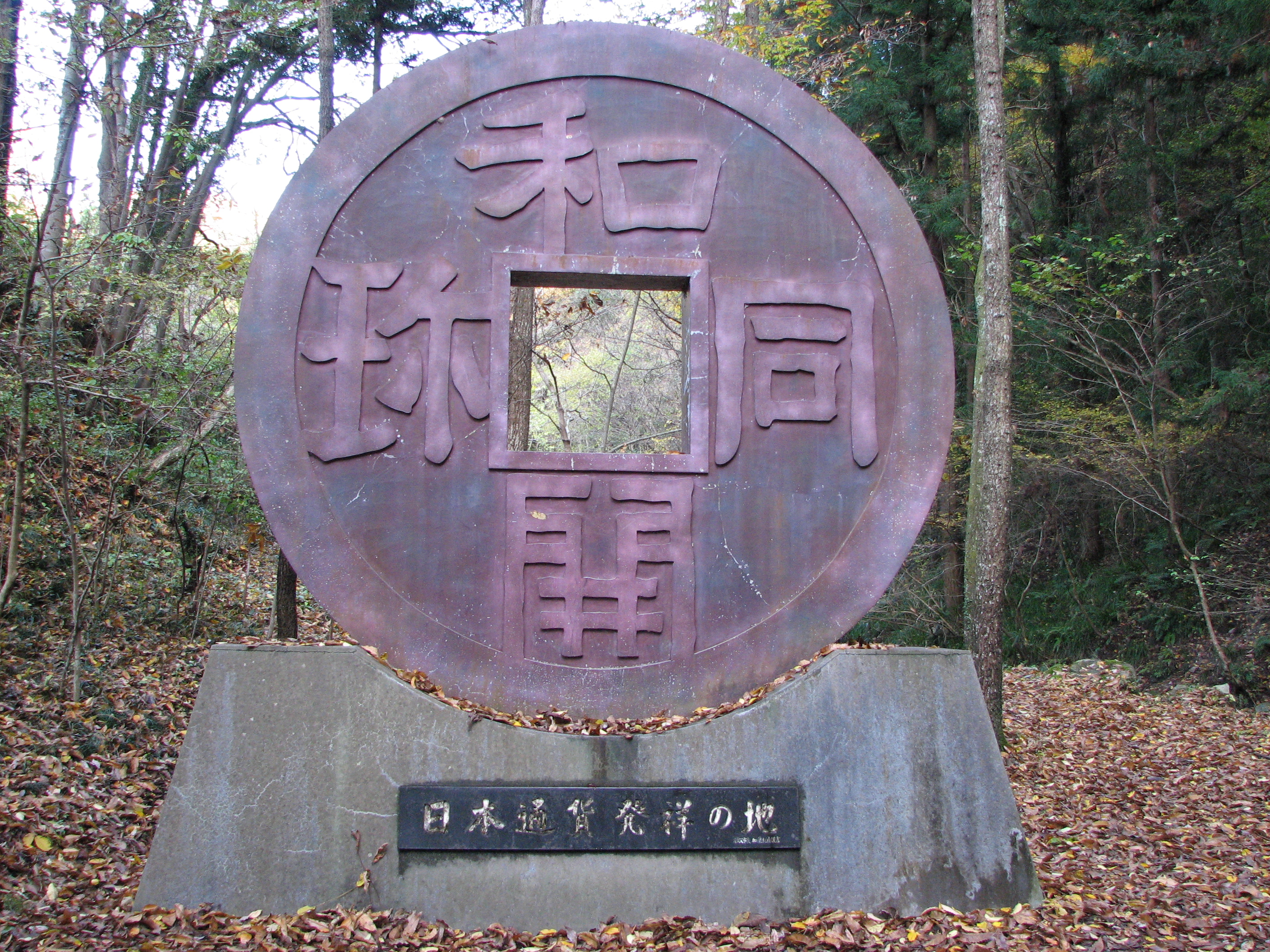
Wadōkaichin monument in Saitama

- 707 (Keiun 4): Deposits of copper were reported to have been found in Chichibu in Musashi Province in the region which includes modern day Tokyo;
- 708 (Keiun 5):, The era name was about to be changed to mark the accession of Empress Genmei; but the choice of Wadō as the new nengō for this new reign became a way to mark the welcome discovery of copper. The Japanese word for copper is dō (銅); and since this was indigenous copper, the "wa" (the ancient Chinese term for Japan) could be combined with the "dō" (copper) to create a new composite term – "wadō" – meaning "Japanese copper."
- May 5, 708 (Wadō 1, 11th day of the 4th month): A sample of the newly discovered Musashi copper from was presented in Genmei's Court where it was formally acknowledged as "Japanese" copper; and a mint was established in Ōmi Province.
- 708 (Wadō 1, 3rd month): Fuijwara no Fuhito was named Minister of the Right (Udaijin) . Isonokami no Maro was Minister of the Left (Sadaijin).
- 709 (Wadō 2, 3rd month): There was an uprising against governmental authority in Mutsu Province and in Echigo Province. Troops were promptly dispatched to subdue the revolt.
- 709 (Wadō 2, 5th month): Ambassadors arrived from Silla, bringing an offer of tribute. He visited Fujiwara no Fuhito to prepare the way for further visits.

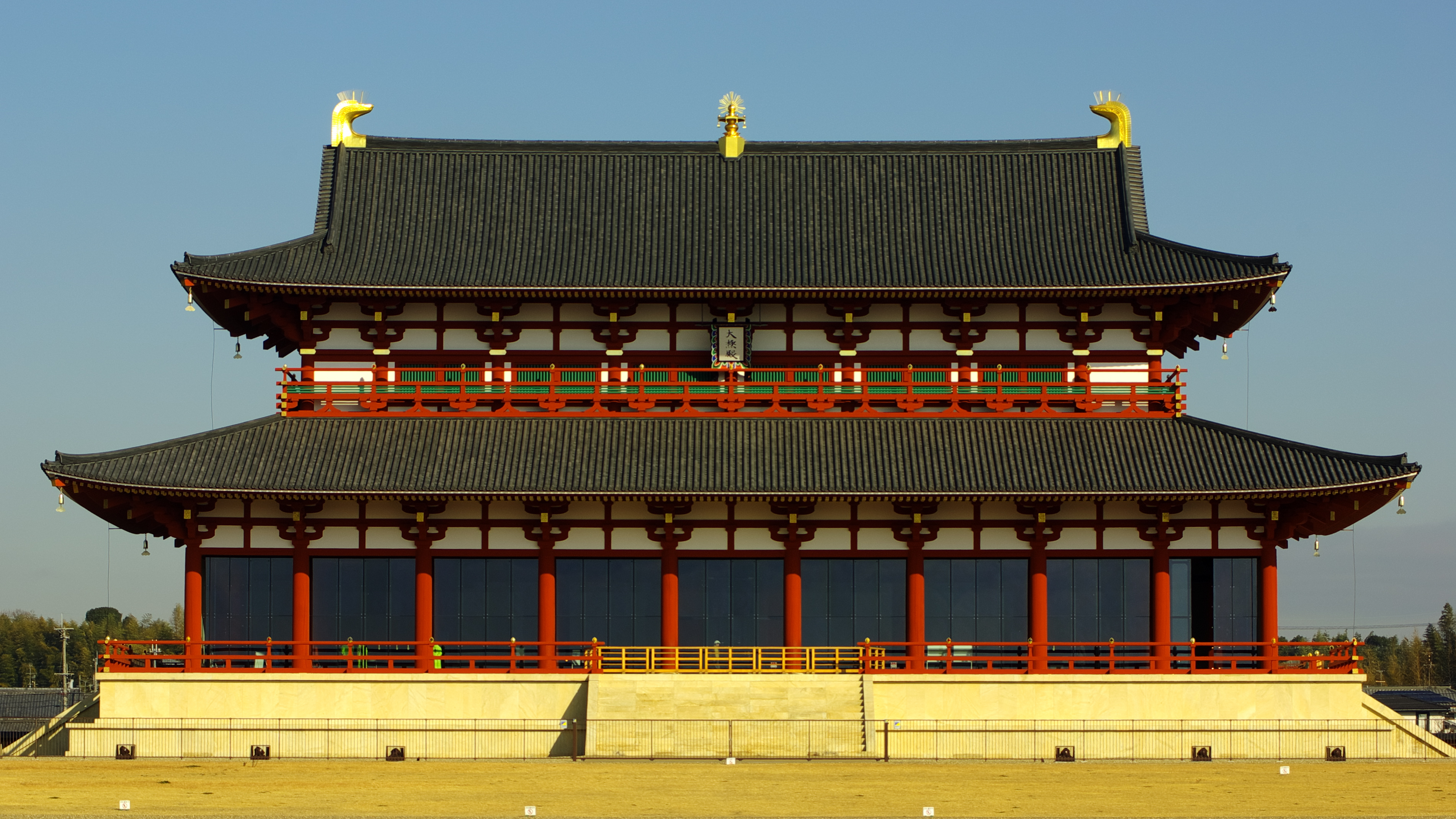
Daigokuden of Heijō-kyō at the time of capital move (reconstructed in 2010)

- 710 (Wadō 3, 3rd month): Empress Genmei established her official residence in Nara. In the last years of the Mommu's reign, the extensive preparations for this projected move had begun; but the work could not be completed before the late-emperor's death. Shortly after the nengō was changed to Wadō, an Imperial Rescript was issued concerning the establishment of a new capital at the Heijō-kyō at Nara in Yamato Province. It had been customary since ancient times for the capital to be moved with the beginning of each new reign. However, Emperor Mommu decided not to move the capital, preferring instead to stay at the Fujiwara Palace which had been established by Empress Jitō. Empress Genmei's palace was named Nara-no-miya.
- 711 (Wadō 4, 3rd month): The Kojiki was published in three volumes. This work presented a history of Japan from a mythological period of god-rulers up through the 28th day of the 1st month of the fifth year of Empress Suiko's reign (597). Emperor Tenmu failed to bring the work to completion before his death in 686. Empress Genmei, along with other court officials, deserve credit for continuing to patronize and encourage the mammoth project.
- 712 (Wadō 5): The Mutsu Province was separated from Dewa Province.
- 713 (Wadō 6, 3rd month): Tanba Province was separated from Tango Province; Mimasaka Province was divided from Bizen Province; and Hyūga Province was divided from Ōsumi Province.
- 713 (Wadō 6): The compilation of Fudoki was begun with the imprimatur of an Imperial decree; and copies of the census of the provinces of Izumo, Harima, Hitachi and two other provinces still exist. This work was intended to describe all provinces, cities, mountains, rivers, valleys and plains. It is intended to become a catalog of the plants, trees, birds, and mammals of Japan. It also intended to contain information about all of the remarkable events which, from ancient times to the present, have happened in the country.
- 713 (Wadō 6): The road which traverses Mino Province and Shinano Province was widened to accommodate travelers; and the road was widened in the Kiso District of modern Nagano Prefecture.

After Empress Genmei transferred the seat of her government to Nara, this mountain location remained the capital throughout the succeeding seven reigns. In a sense, the years of the Nara period developed into one of the more significant consequences of her comparatively short reign.

Genmei had initially planned to remain on the throne until her grandson might reach maturity. However, in 715, Genmei did abdicate in favor of Mommu's older sister who then became known as Empress Genshō. Genshō was eventually succeeded by her nephew, who then became known as Emperor Shōmu.

- 715 (Wadō 8): Genmei abdicates in favor of her daughter, Empress Genshō.

The Empress reigned for eight years. Although there were seven other reigning empresses, their successors were most often selected from amongst the males of the paternal Imperial bloodline, which is why some conservative scholars argue that the women's reigns were temporary and that male-only succession tradition must be maintained in the 21st century. Empress Genmei, who was followed on the throne by her daughter, remains the sole exception to this conventional argument.

After abdicating, she was known as Daijō-tennō; and she was only the second woman after Empress Jitō to claim this title. Genmei lived in retirement for seven years until her death at the age of 61 in December 721.

The actual site of Genmei's grave is known. This empress is traditionally venerated at a memorial Shinto shrine (misasagi) in Narazaka-cho, Nara City which has been designated by the Imperial Household Agency as Genmei's mausoleum. The "mountain shape" misasagi was named Nahoyama-no-higashi no misasagi.

=== Poetry ===
The Man'yōshū includes a poem written said to be composed by Empress Genmei in 708 (Wadō 1) – and this anthology also includes a reply created by one of the ladies of her court::

Listen to the sounds of the warriors' elbow-guards;

Our captain must be ranging the shields to drill the troops.

– Genmei-tennō

Reply:
Be not concerned, O my Sovereign;

Am I not here,

I, whom the ancestral gods endowed with life,
Next of kin to yourself?

– Minabe-hime

=== Kugyō ===
Kugyō (公卿) is a collective term for the very few most powerful men attached to the court of the Emperor of Japan in pre-Meiji eras.

In general, this elite group included only three to four men at a time. These were hereditary courtiers whose experience and background would have brought them to the pinnacle of a life's career. During Genmei's reign, this apex of the Daijō-kan included:

- Daijō-daijin, Prince Hozumi.
- Sadaijin, Isonokami no Maro (石上麻呂). 708–717
- Udaijin, Fujiwara no Fuhito (藤原不比等). 708–720
- Naidaijin
- Dainagon

== Spouse and children ==
Empress Genmei was born to Emperor Tenji and his concubine, Soga no Mei-no-iratsume, who held the rank of Hin (Beauty). She initially was named Princess Abe (阿閇皇女). She had an elder sister by the same mother: Princess Minabe.

Princess Abe married Prince Kusakabe, her eldest half-sister's son, and had issue: two daughters among which the eldest would become Empress Gensho and one son who would ascend the throne as Emperor Monmu.

- Husband: Prince Kusakabe (草壁皇子, d. May 10, 689), son of Emperor Tenmu and Empress Jitō
  - First Daughter: Princess Hidaka (氷高皇女) later Empress Gensho
  - First Son: Prince Karu (珂瑠/軽) later Emperor Monmu
  - Second Daughter: Imperial Princess Kibi (吉備内親王, 686–729) married Prince Nagaya

== Eras of Genmei's reign ==
The years of Genmei's reign are more specifically identified by more than one era name or nengō.

- Keiun (704–708)
- Wadō (708–715)
- Reiki (715–717)

== See also ==
- Empress of Japan
- Emperor of Japan
  - List of emperors of Japan
- Imperial cult

== Notes ==
Japanese Imperial kamon – a stylized chrysanthemum blossom

Regnal titles
Preceded by Emperor Monmu	Empress of Japan: Genmei; 707–715	Succeeded by Empress Genshō
