= Emperor Monmu =

Emperor of Japan from 697 to 707

Emperor Monmu 文武天皇
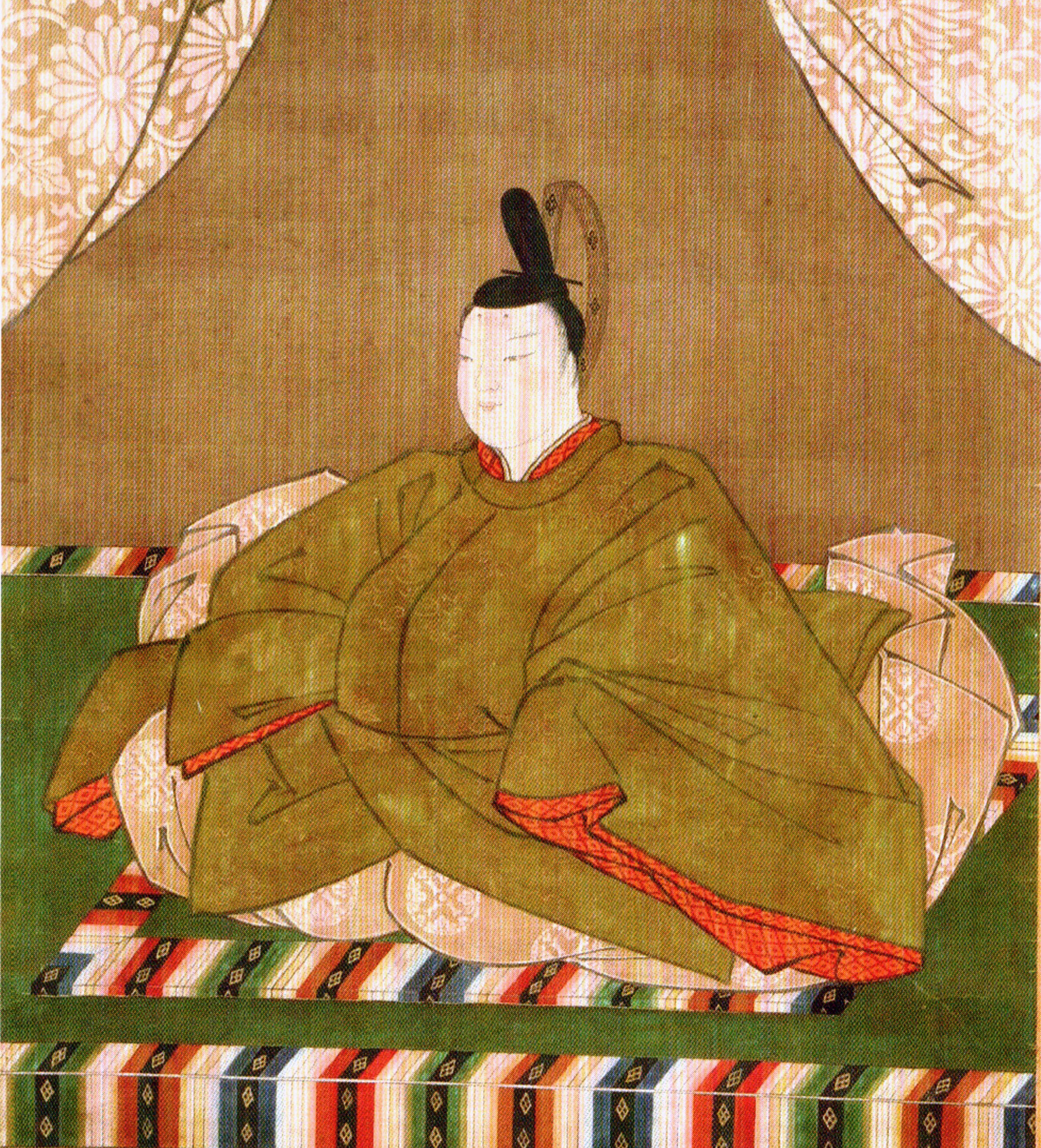

Emperor of Japan
- Reign: 697–707
- Enthronement: September 23, 697
- Predecessor: Jitō
- Successor: Genmei
- Born: Karu (珂瑠 or 軽); October 13 683
- Died: July 18, 707 (aged 23); Fujiwara-kyō, Japan
- Burial: Hinokuma no Ako no oka no e no misasagi (檜隈安古岡上陵) (Nara)
- Issue: Emperor Shōmu; Prince Hironari; Prince Hiroyo
Posthumous name
- Chinese-style shigō: Emperor Monmu (文武天皇) Japanese-style shigō: Yamato-neko-toyoohoji no Sumeramikoto (倭根子豊祖父天皇) (707); Ame-no-mamune-toyoohoji no Sumeramikoto (天之真宗豊祖父天皇) (797)
- House: Imperial House of Japan
- Father: Prince Kusakabe
- Mother: Empress Genmei

Emperor Monmu (文武天皇, Monmu-tennō; 683–707) was the 42nd emperor of Japan, according to the traditional order of succession.

Monmu's reign spanned the years from 697 through 707.

== Traditional narrative ==
Before his ascension to the Chrysanthemum Throne, his personal name (imina) was Karu-shinnō.

He was a grandson of Emperor Tenmu and Empress Jitō. He was the second son of Prince Kusakabe. Monmu's mother was Princess Abe, a daughter of Emperor Tenji. Monmu's mother would later accede to the throne herself, and she would be known as Empress Genmei.

=== Events of Monmu's life ===
Karu-shinnō was only six years old when his father, Crown Prince Kusakabe, died.

- 697: In the 10th year of Jitō-tennō's reign (持統天皇十年), the empress abdicated; and the succession (senso) was received by a grandson of Emperor Tenmu. Shortly thereafter, Emperor Monmu is said to have acceded to the throne (sokui).

Emperor Monmu ruled until his death in 707, at which point he was succeeded by his mother, Empress Genmei, who was also his first cousin once removed and his first cousin twice removed. He left a young son by Fujiwara no Miyako, a daughter of Fujiwara no Fuhito: Obito no miko (Prince Obito), who eventually became Emperor Shōmu.

Emperor Monmu's reign lasted 10 years. He died at the age of 25.

The actual site of Monmu's grave is known. This emperor is traditionally venerated at a memorial Shinto shrine (misasagi) at Nara.

The Imperial Household Agency designates this location as Monmu's mausoleum. It is formally named Hinokuma no Ako no oka no e no misasagi.

=== Kugyō ===
Kugyō (公卿) is a collective term for the very few most powerful men attached to the court of the Emperor of Japan in pre-Meiji eras.

In general, this elite group included only three to four men at a time. These were hereditary courtiers whose experience and background would have brought them to the pinnacle of a life's career. During Monmu's reign, this apex of the Daijō-kan included:

- Daijō-daijin, Osakabe-shinnō.
- Sadaijin
- Udaijin
- Naidaijin, Nakatomi Kamako no Muraji.
- Dainagon, Fujiwara Fuhito.

== Eras of Monmu's reign ==
Conventional modern scholarship seems to have determined that the years of Monmu's reign are encompassed within more than one era name or nengō.

- Taihō (era) (701–704)
- Keiun (704–708)

=== Non-nengō period ===
The initial years of Monmu's reign are not linked by scholars to any era or nengō. The Taika era innovation of naming time periods – nengō – languished until Monmu reasserted an imperial right by proclaiming the commencement of Taihō in 701.

- See Japanese era name – "Non-nengo periods"
- See Monmu period (697–701).

In this context, Brown and Ishida's translation of Gukanshō offers an explanation about the years of Empress Jitō's reign which muddies a sense of easy clarity in the pre-Taiho time-frame:

"The eras that fell in this reign were: (1) the remaining seven years of Shuchō [(686+7=692?)]; and (2) Taika, which was four years long [695–698]. (The first year of this era was kinoto-hitsuji [695].) ... In the third year of the Taka era [697], Empress Jitō yielded the throne to the Crown Prince."

== Consorts and children ==
Bunin: Fujiwara no Miyako (藤原宮子, d. 754), Fujiwara no Fuhito’s daughter

- First Son: Prince Obito (首皇子) later Emperor Shōmu

Hin: Ki no Kamado-no-iratsume (紀竃門娘)

Hin: Ishikawa no Tone-no-iratsume (石川刀子娘)

- Takamado Hironari (Hiroyo)

== See also ==
- Emperor of Japan
- List of Emperors of Japan
- Imperial cult
- Taihō Code

== Notes ==
Japanese Imperial kamon — a stylized chrysanthemum blossom

Regnal titles
Preceded by Empress Jitō	Emperor of Japan: Monmu; 697–707	Succeeded by Empress Genmei
