= Kura (saddle) =

Japanese horse saddle

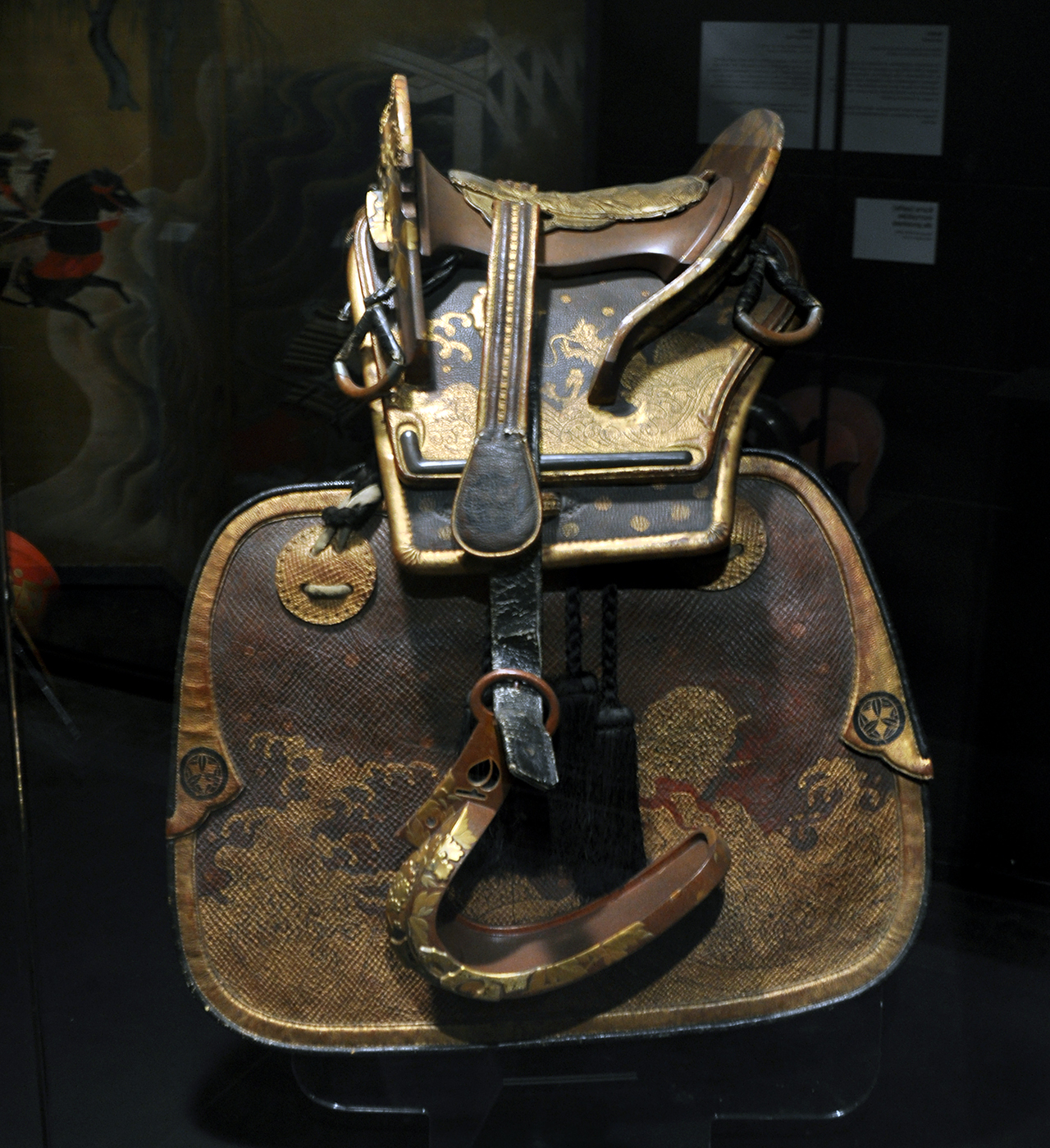
Antique Japanese (Samurai) saddle (kura), from the "Samurai: Armor of the Warrior" exhibit 2011, Musée du Quai Branly, Paris, France

Kura (鞍) is the generic name for the Japanese saddle. The word "kura" is most commonly associated with the saddle used by the samurai class of feudal Japan. Over time the Japanese added elements of their own until the Japanese saddle became an identifiable style, also known as the samurai saddle.

== History and description ==
The Japanese were known to be using the Chinese style of saddle during the Nara period (AD 710 to 794), but during the Heian (794 to 1185), changes made to the Chinese saddle led to what we now call the kura or Japanese saddle. The Chinese style saddle is known as karagura while the Japanese style is known as yamatogura.

In the fourth century AD, the Japanese started using horses in warfare. Cavalry proved to be decisive in the Jinshin War of 672–73, in Fujiwara no Hirotsugu's rebellion in 740 and in the revolt of Fujiwara no Nakamaro in 756.

Samurai warriors increasingly used horses, and rode two types of kura: the suikangura or "aristocratic saddle", and the gunjingura, or war saddle. The main weapon of early samurai warfare was the yumi (bow) and the kura provided a rugged, stable, comfortable platform for shooting arrows. However, the design was not well suited for speed or distance. The introduction of firearms in Japan in 1543 eventually led to the development of the Japanese matchlock (tanegashima) which supplanted the yumi as the weapon of choice by the samurai. As a result, horse-mounted samurai were no longer the main military force. During the Edo period (1603 to 1868) horses were no longer needed for warfare and the samurai started using highly decorated kura with colored lacquers, and extensive intricate inlays and leather work. Mounted samurai became a ceremonial presence in the entourages of processions by their daimyō (feudal lord).

Riding in a saddle was reserved for the samurai class until the end of the samurai era in 1868. Lower classes would ride on a pack saddle (ni-gura or konida-gura) or bareback. Pack horses (ni-uma or konida-uma) carried a variety of merchandise and the baggage of travelers using a pack saddle that ranged from a basic wooden frame to the elaborate pack saddles used for the semi-annual processions (sankin-kōtai) of daimyōs. Pack horses also carried the equipment and food for samurai warriors during military campaigns. With the end of the samurai era and beginning of the Meiji period (1868–1912), non-samurai were allowed to openly ride horses and eventually the Japanese adopted saddles of styles seen in the occidental world. Saddles used by Japanese officers during the Russo-Japanese War (1904–1905) are described as being based on civilian English saddles.

== Kura-no-baju (Japanese saddle and related parts) ==
=== Types of kura ===
==== Yamato gura (Japanese style kura) ====
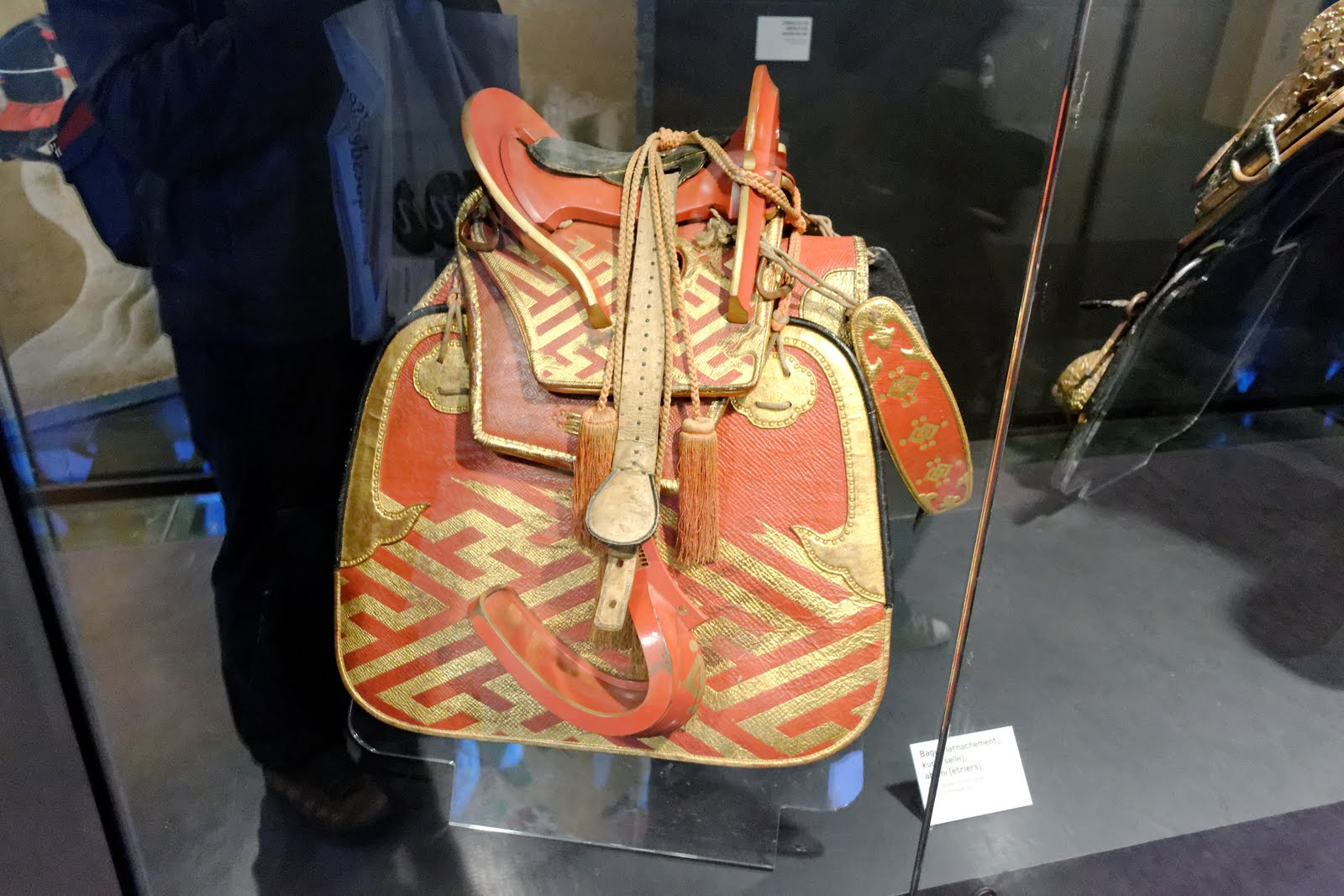

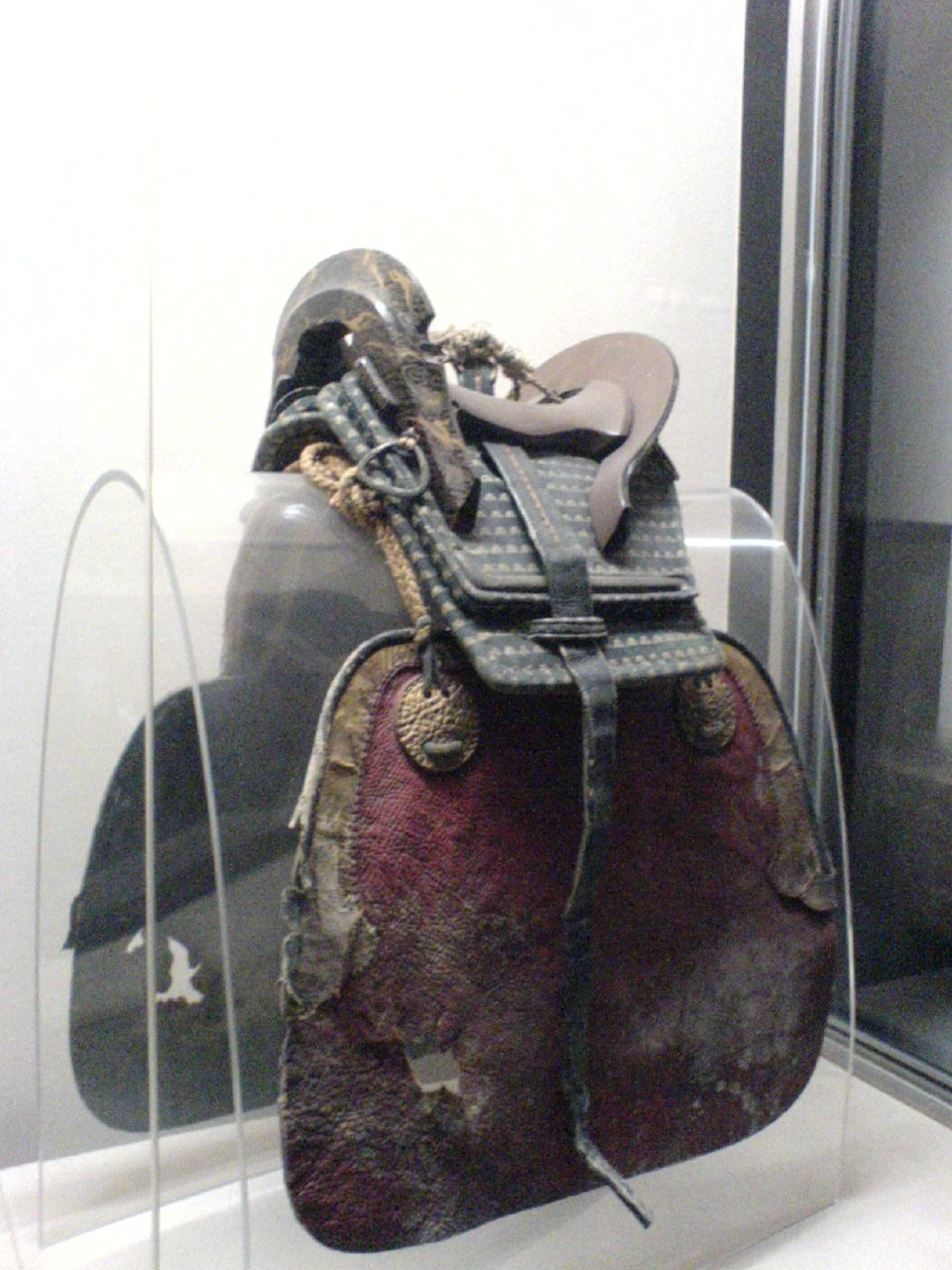

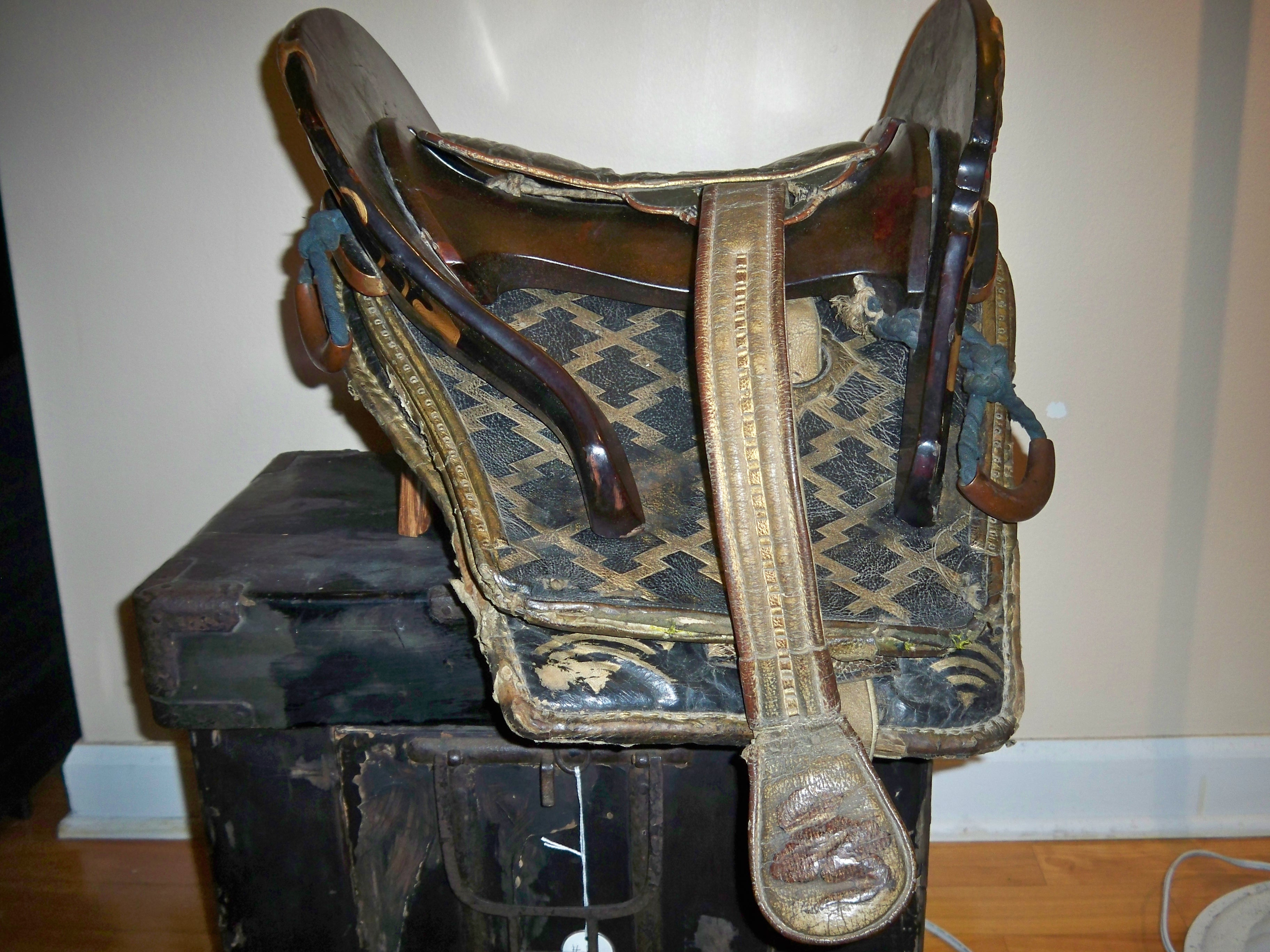

==== Kara gura (Chinese style kura) ====
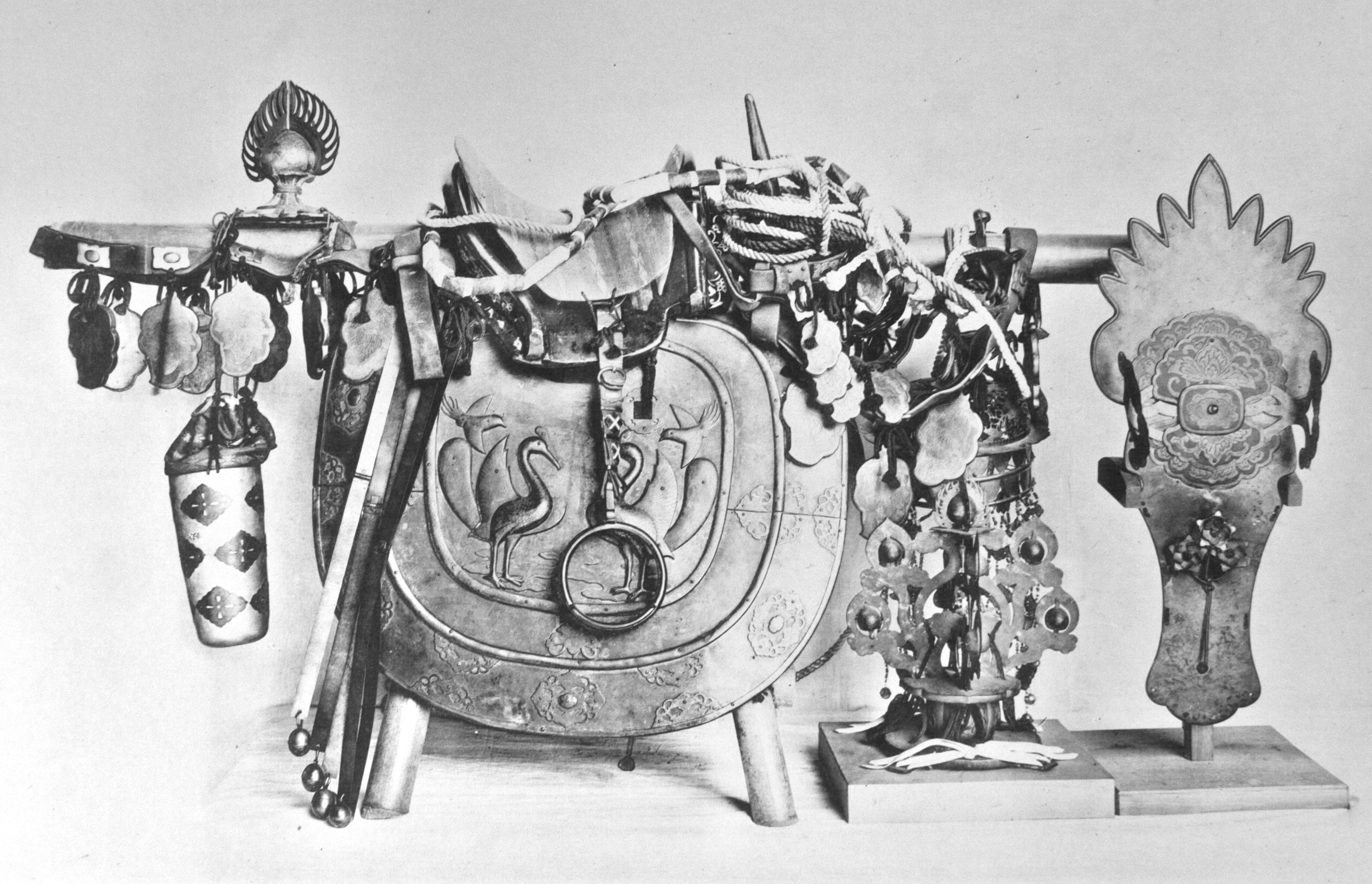

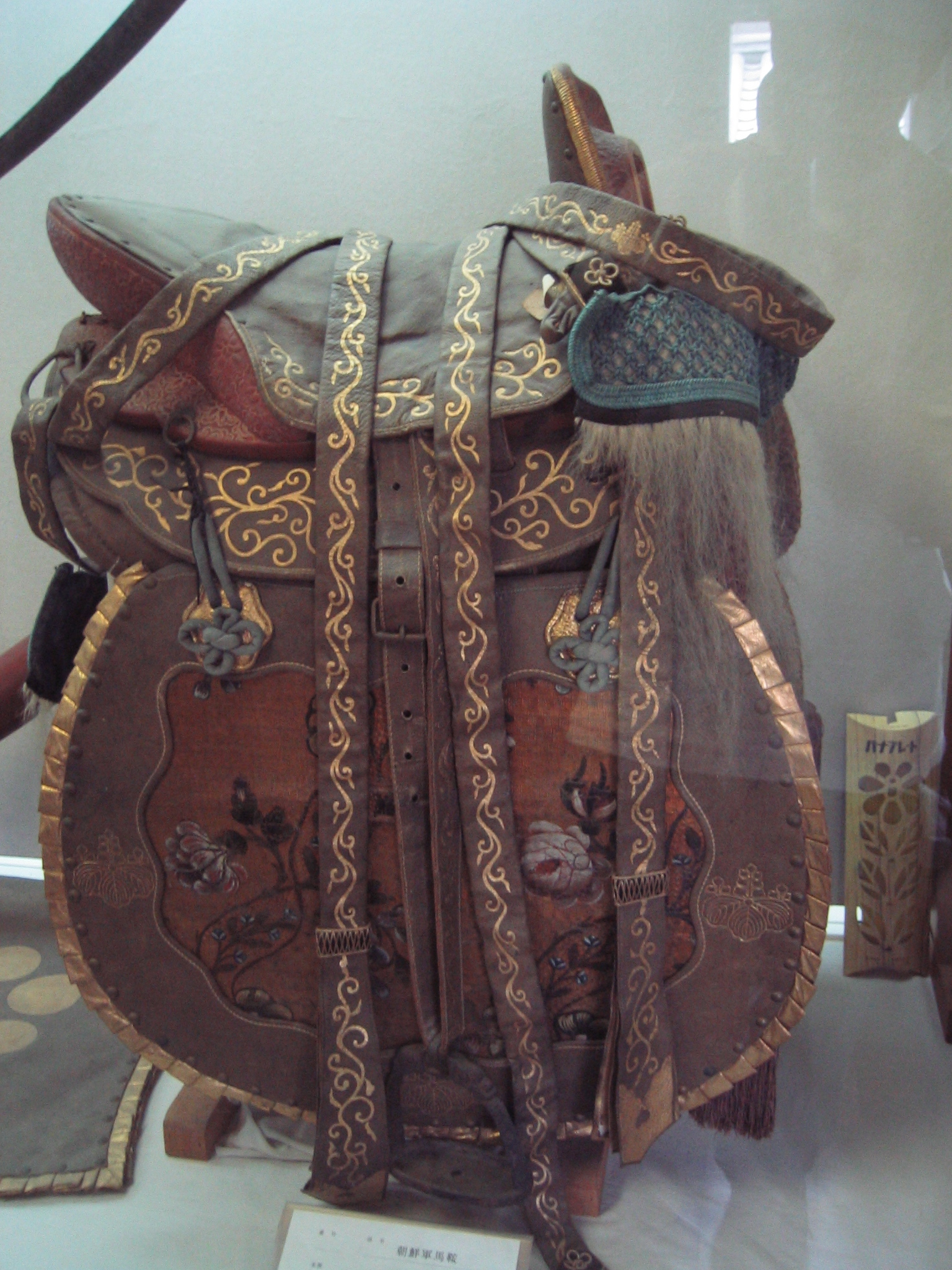

==== Ni-gura or konida-gura (Kura for pack horses (ni-uma or konida-uma)) ====
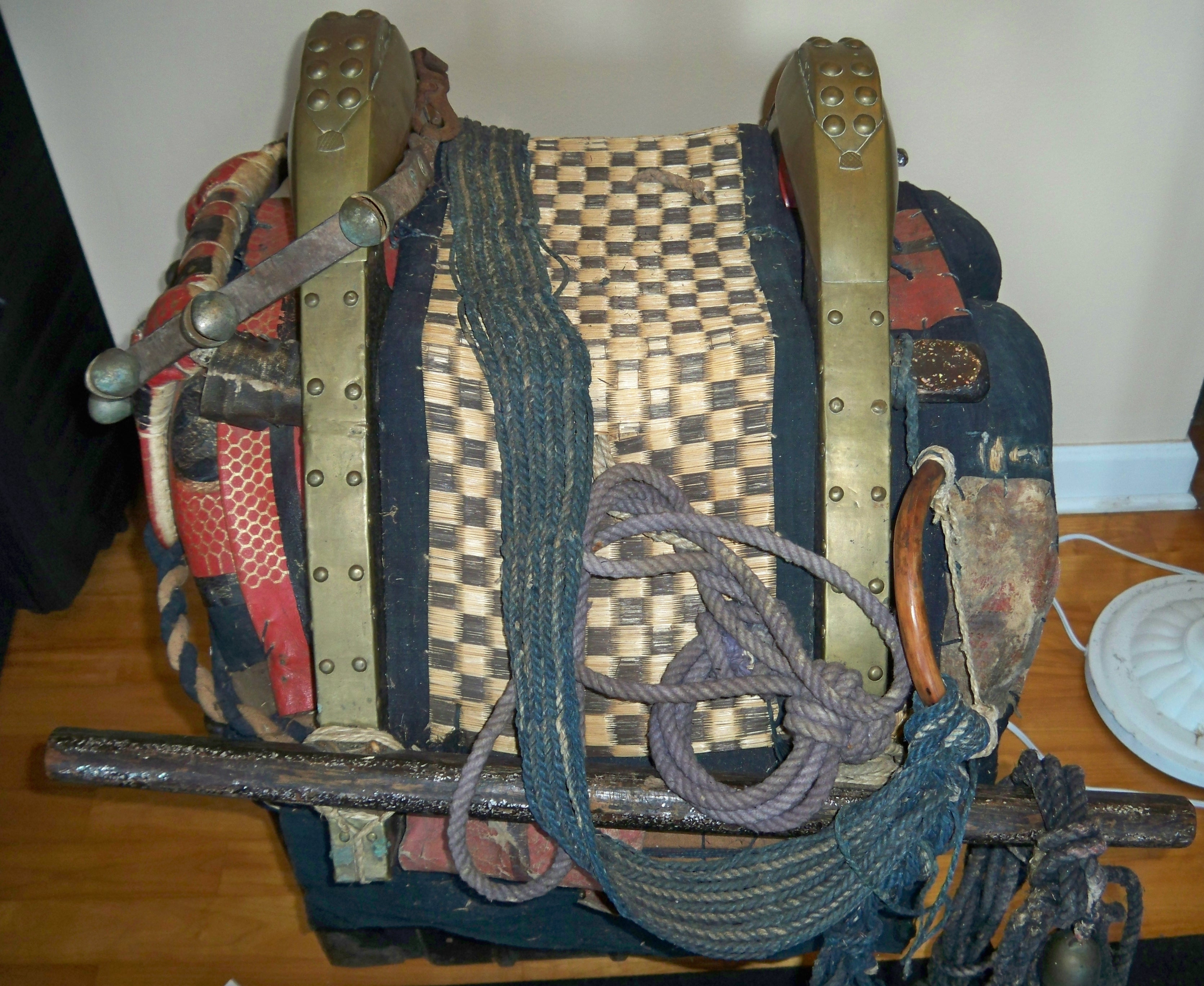

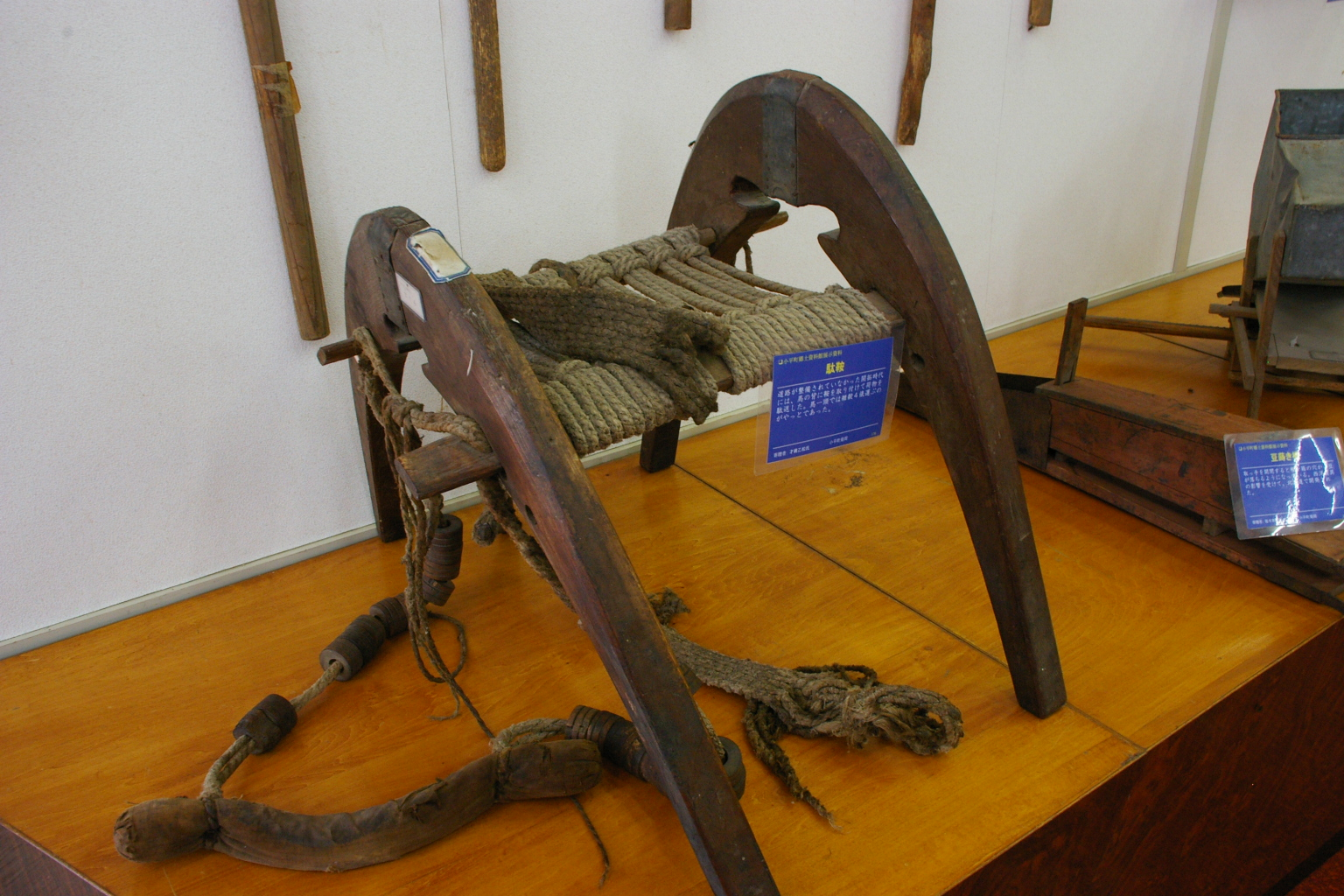

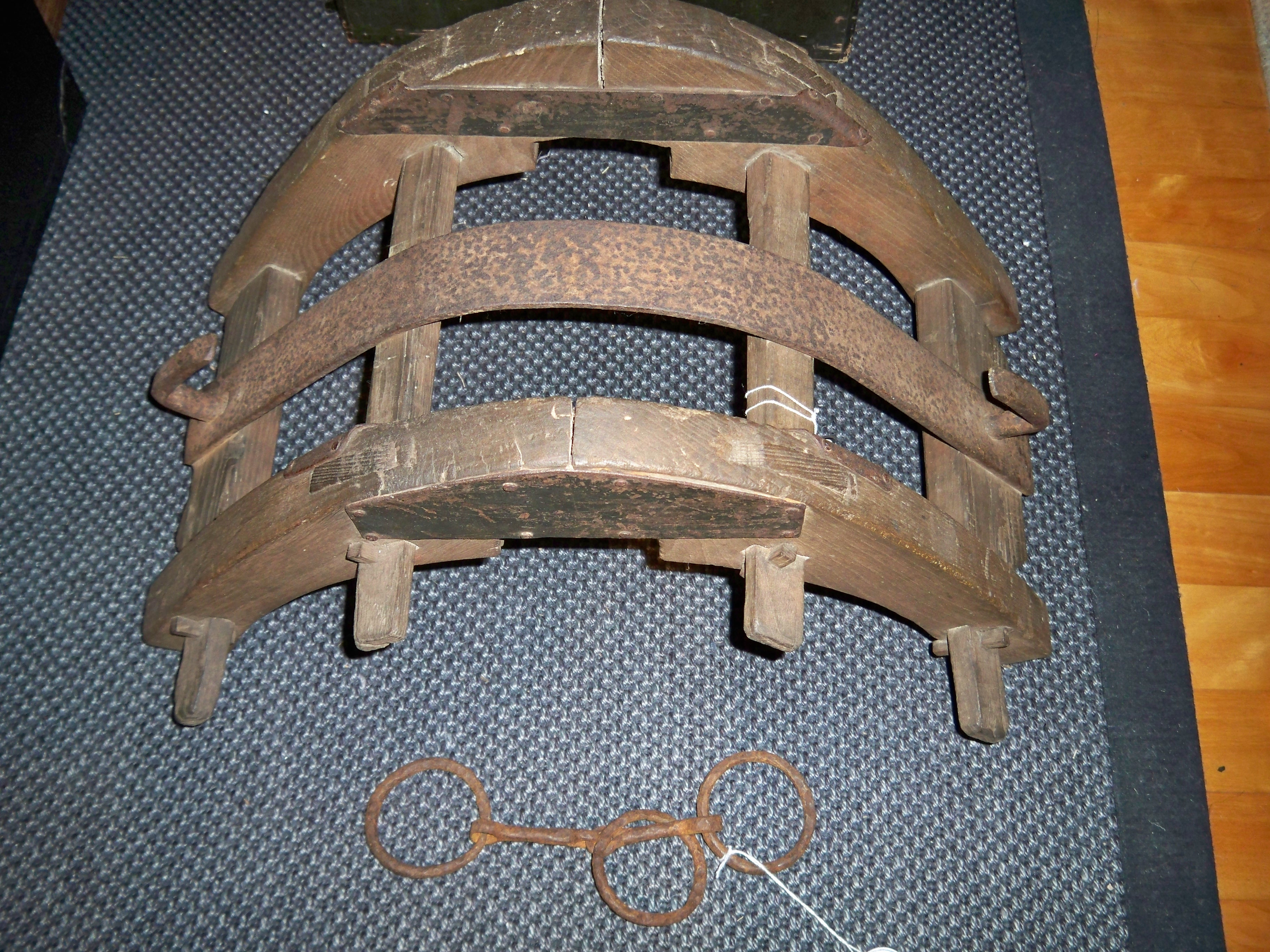

=== Kurabane ===
Kurabane is the wooden tree of the Japanese saddle which was made from red oak (kashi), the parts are connected to each other by joints and cords allowing the kurabane to flex, it has four parts, the maewa (pommel) the arched front plate, the shizuwa (cantle) the arched rear plate, these are connected by two igi (contoured side bands) which connect the maewa to the shizuwa, the igi rest on either side of the horse's spine and serve as the under frame for the leather seat (basen or kura tsubo), the igi are slotted for the stirrup straps (chikara-gawa or gekiso) to pass through.

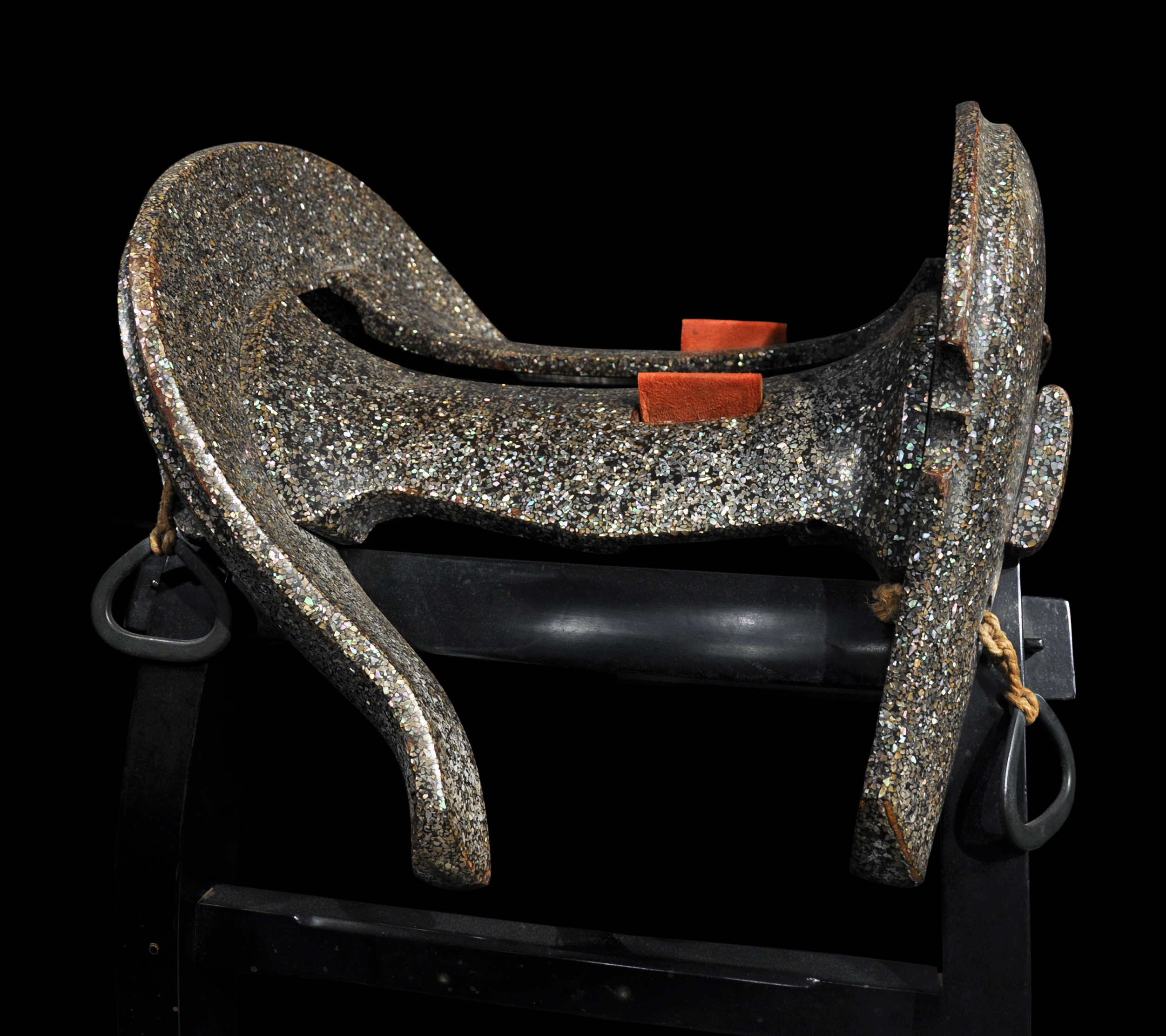

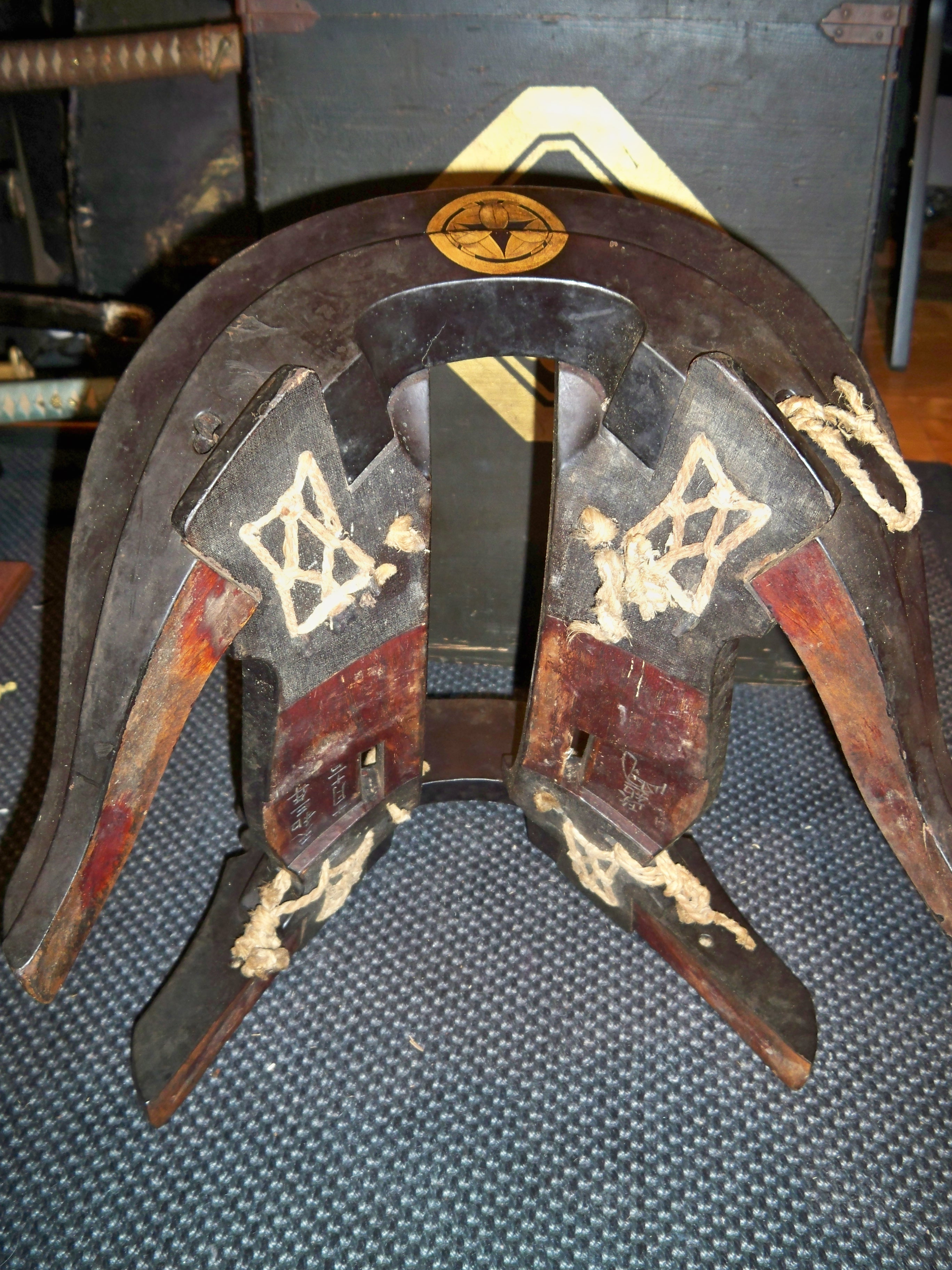

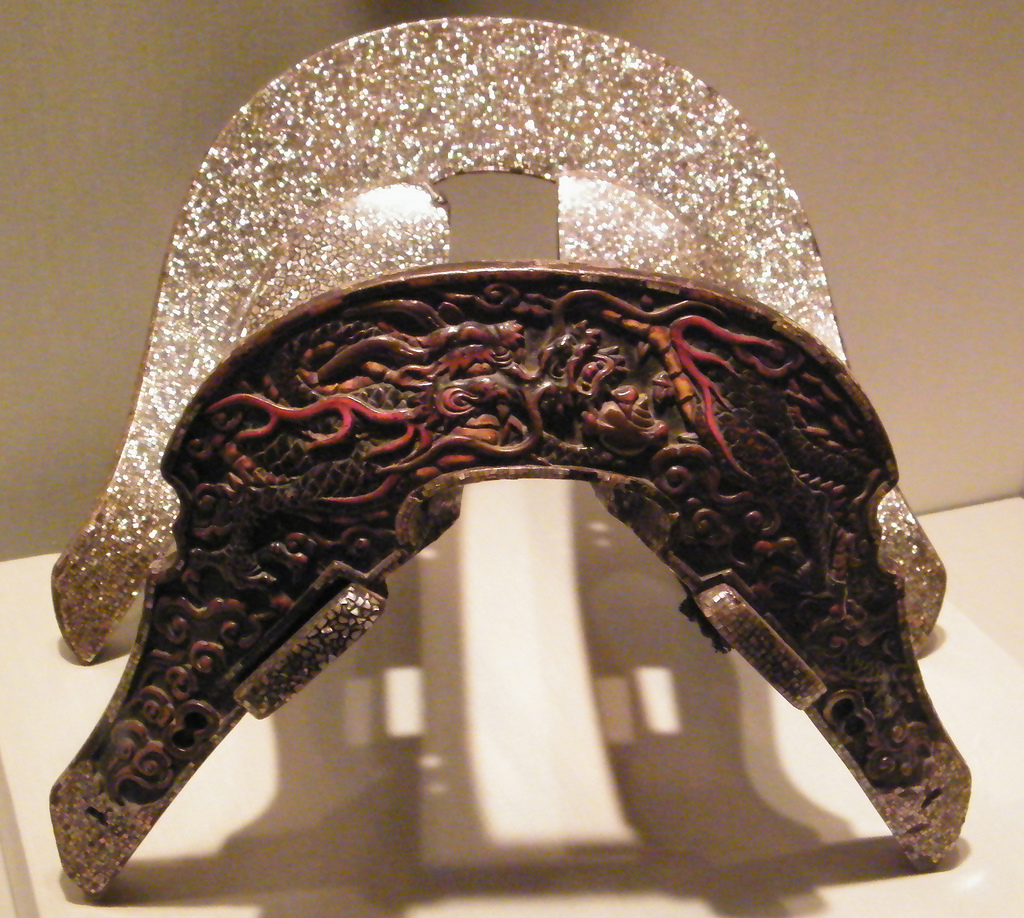

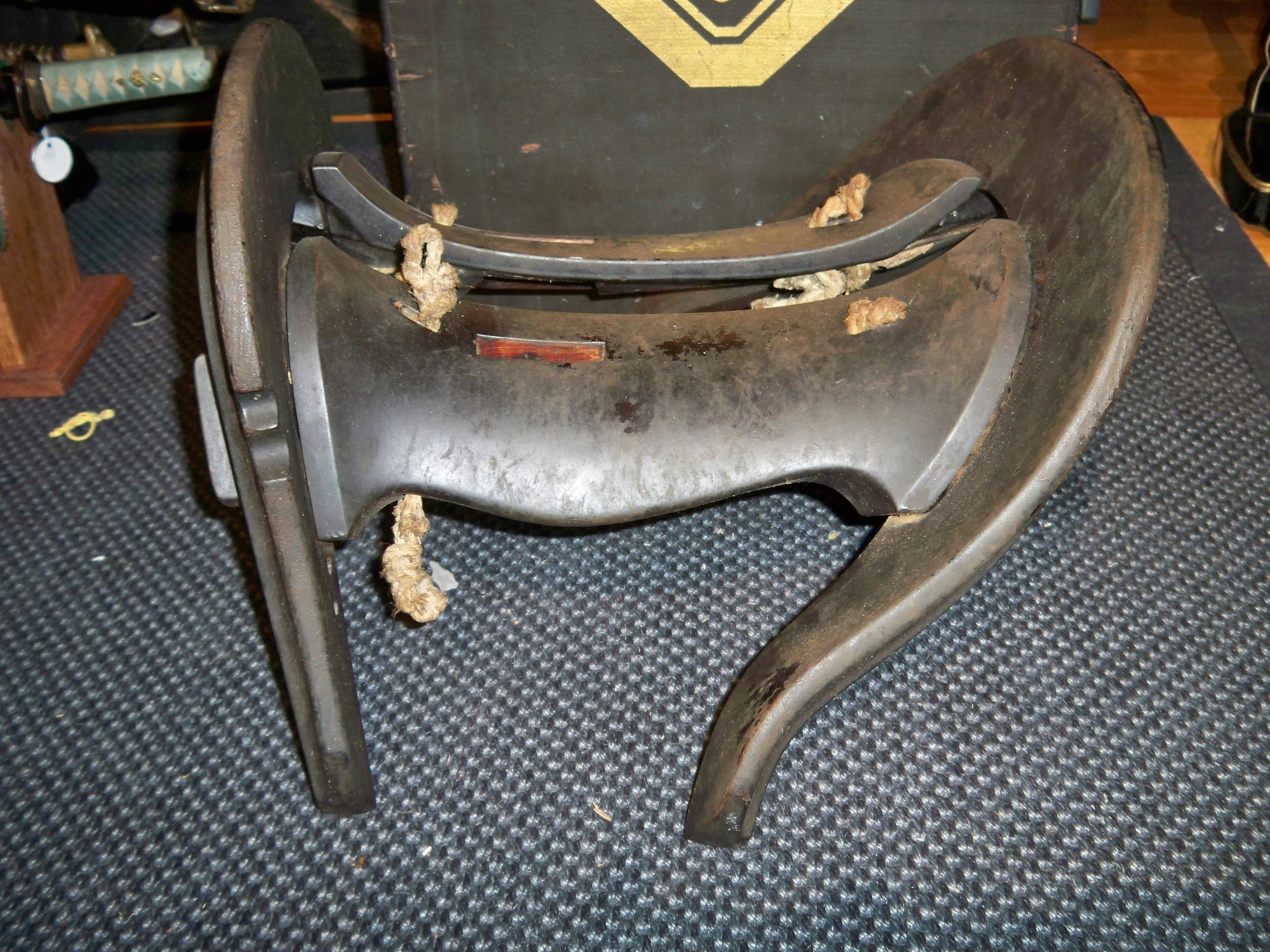

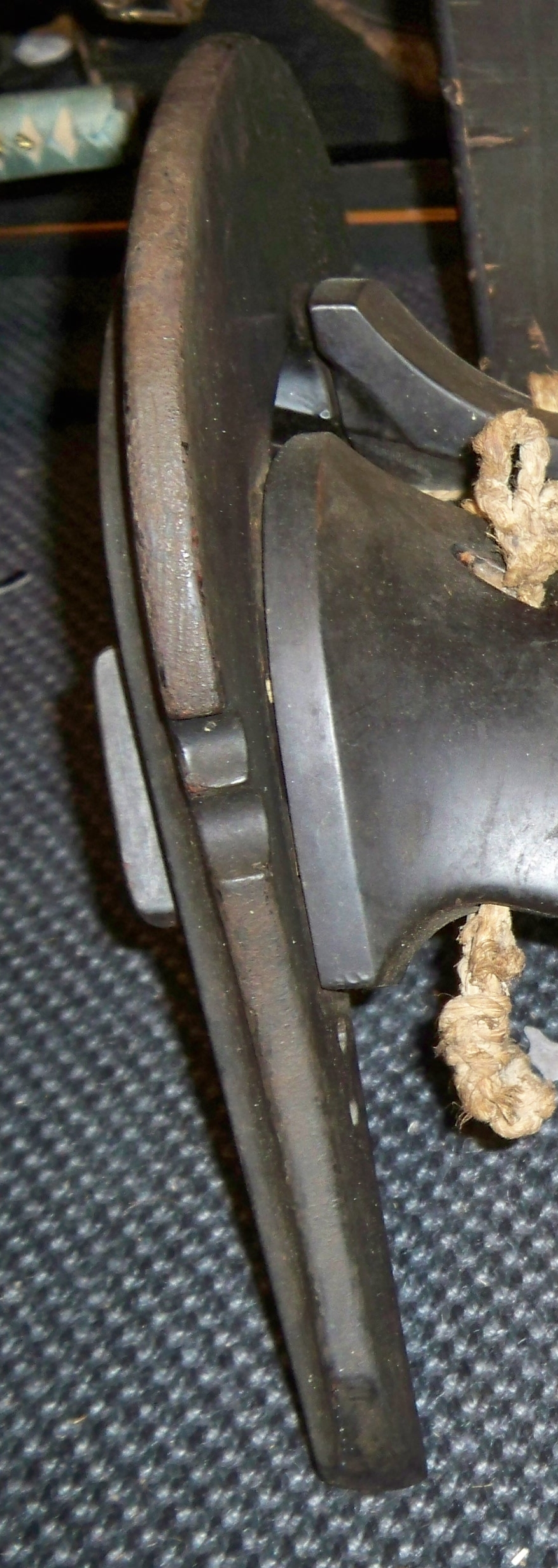
Maewa (pommel), the front arch of a Japanese saddle

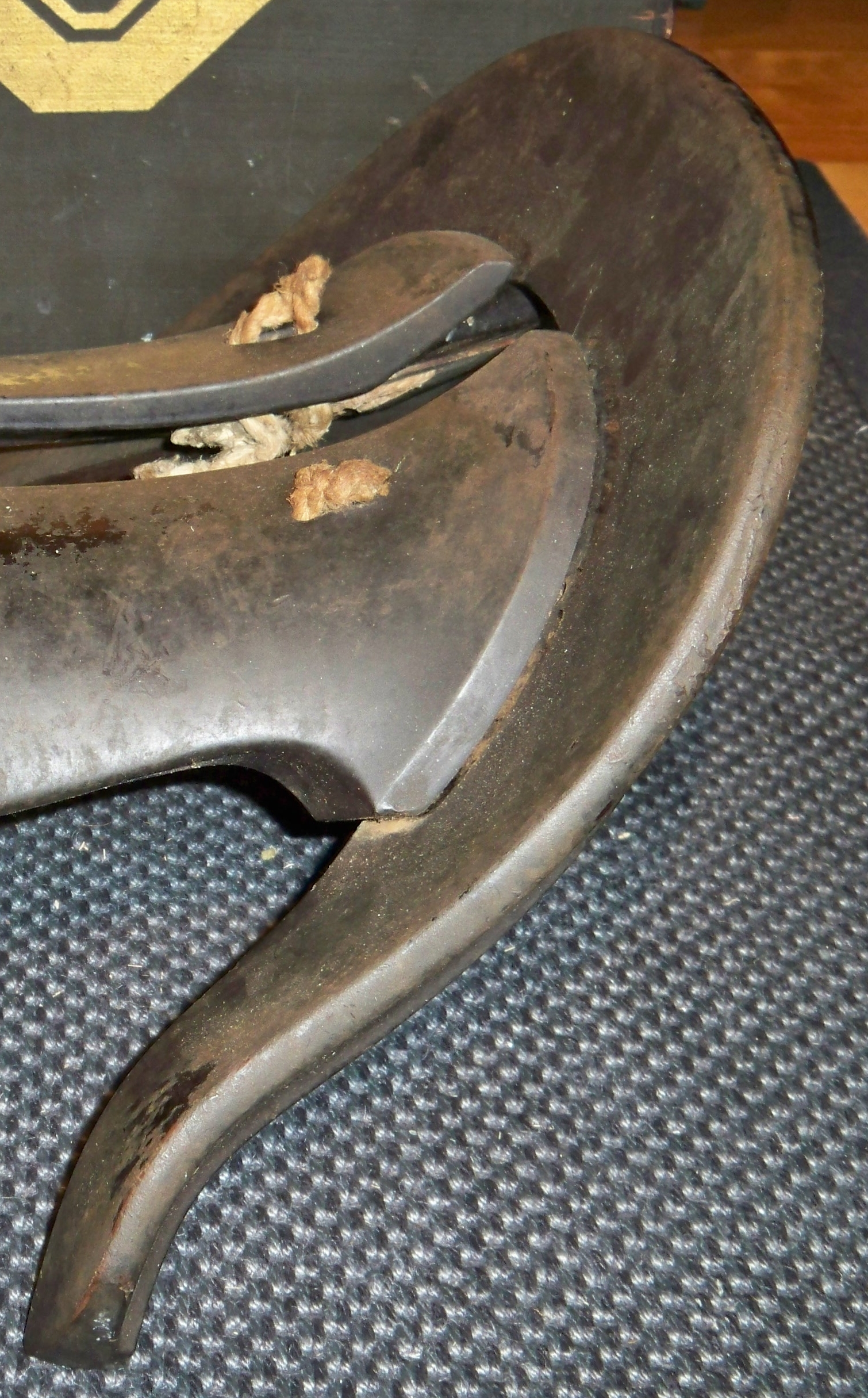
Shizuwa (cantle), the back arch of a Japanese saddle

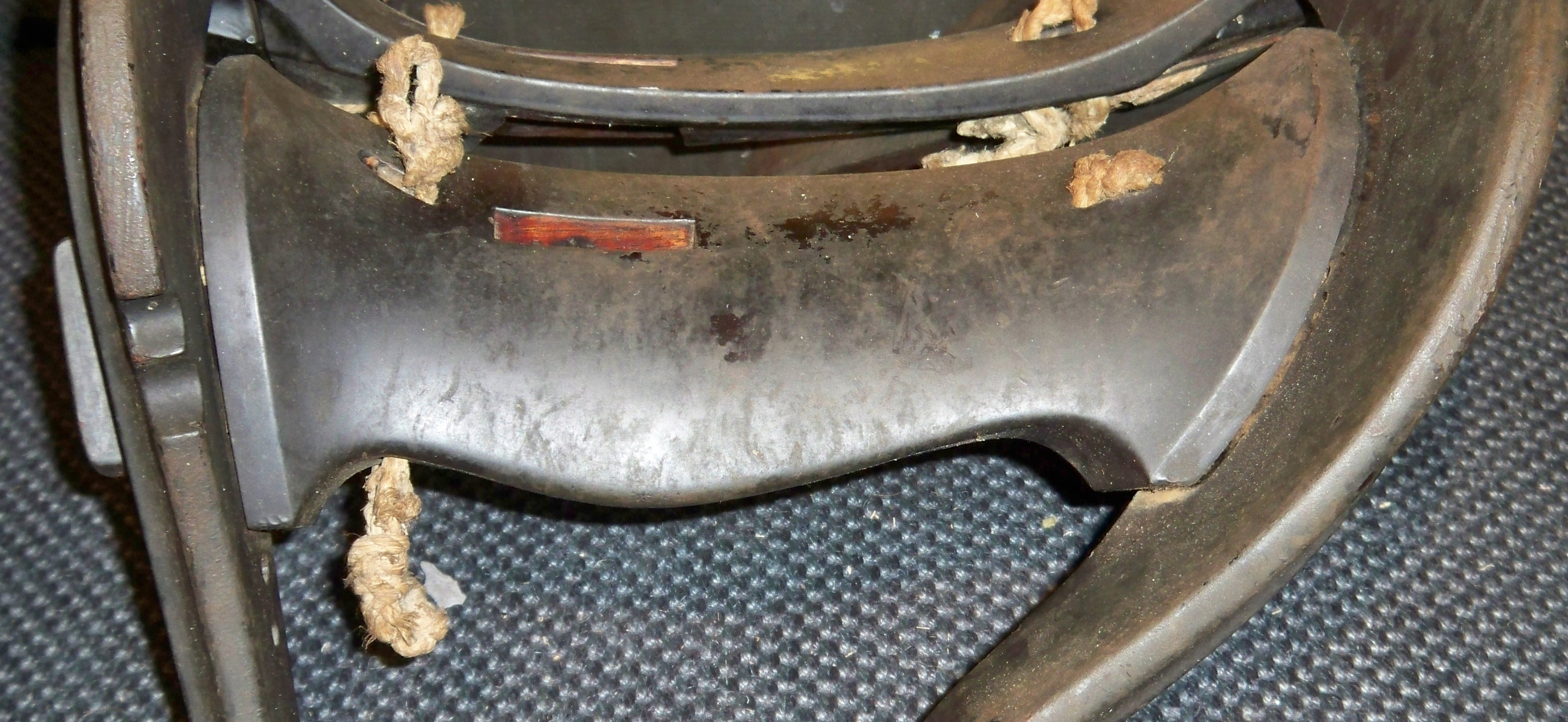
Igi (contoured side bands) of a Japanese saddle, showing the slot for the stirrup strap (Chikara-gawa or gekiso)

=== Basin or kura tsubo ===
The basin/kura tsubo (the thin leather saddle seat), has slots on either side for the stirrup straps (Chikara-gawa or gekiso) to pass through.

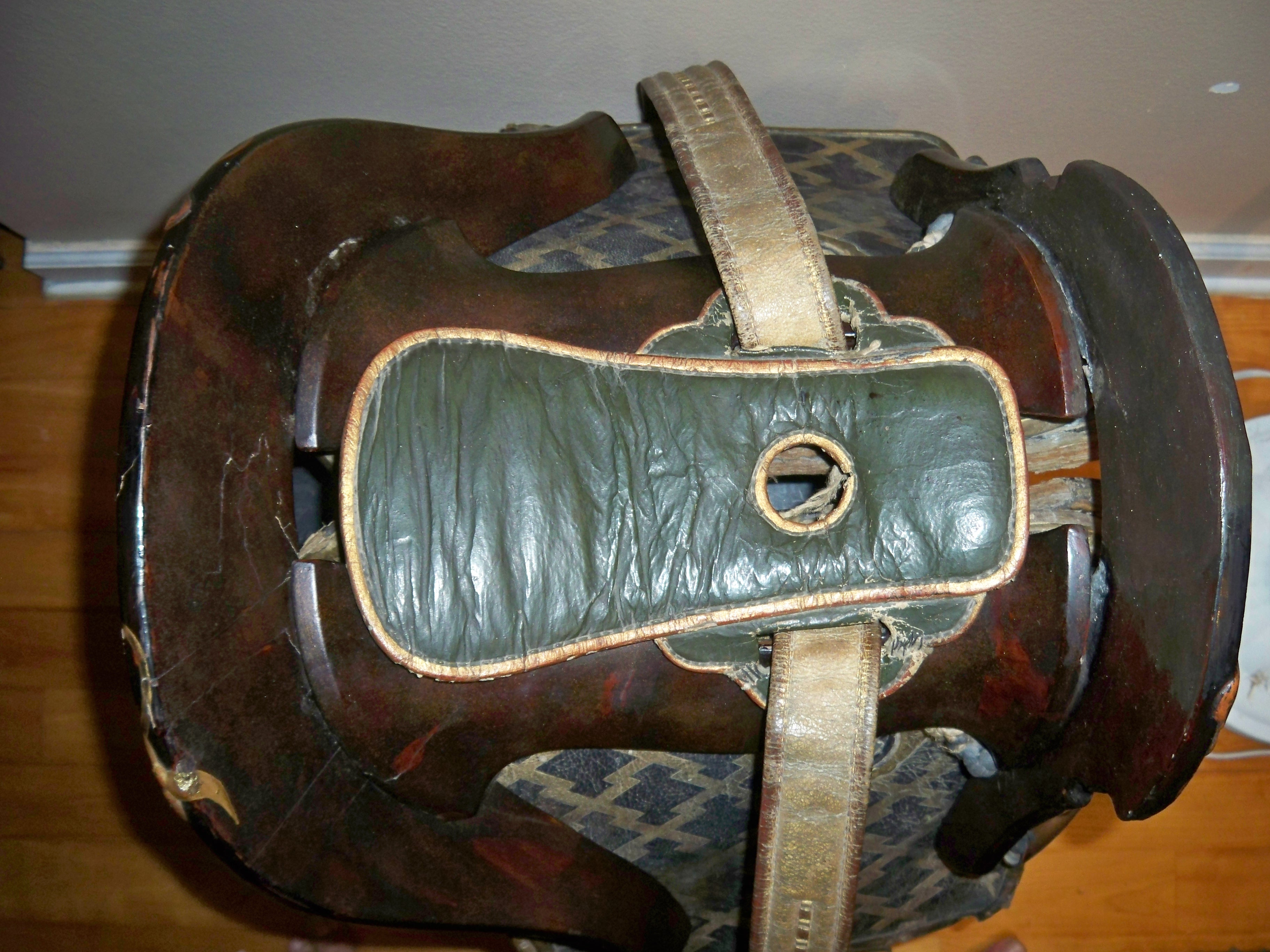

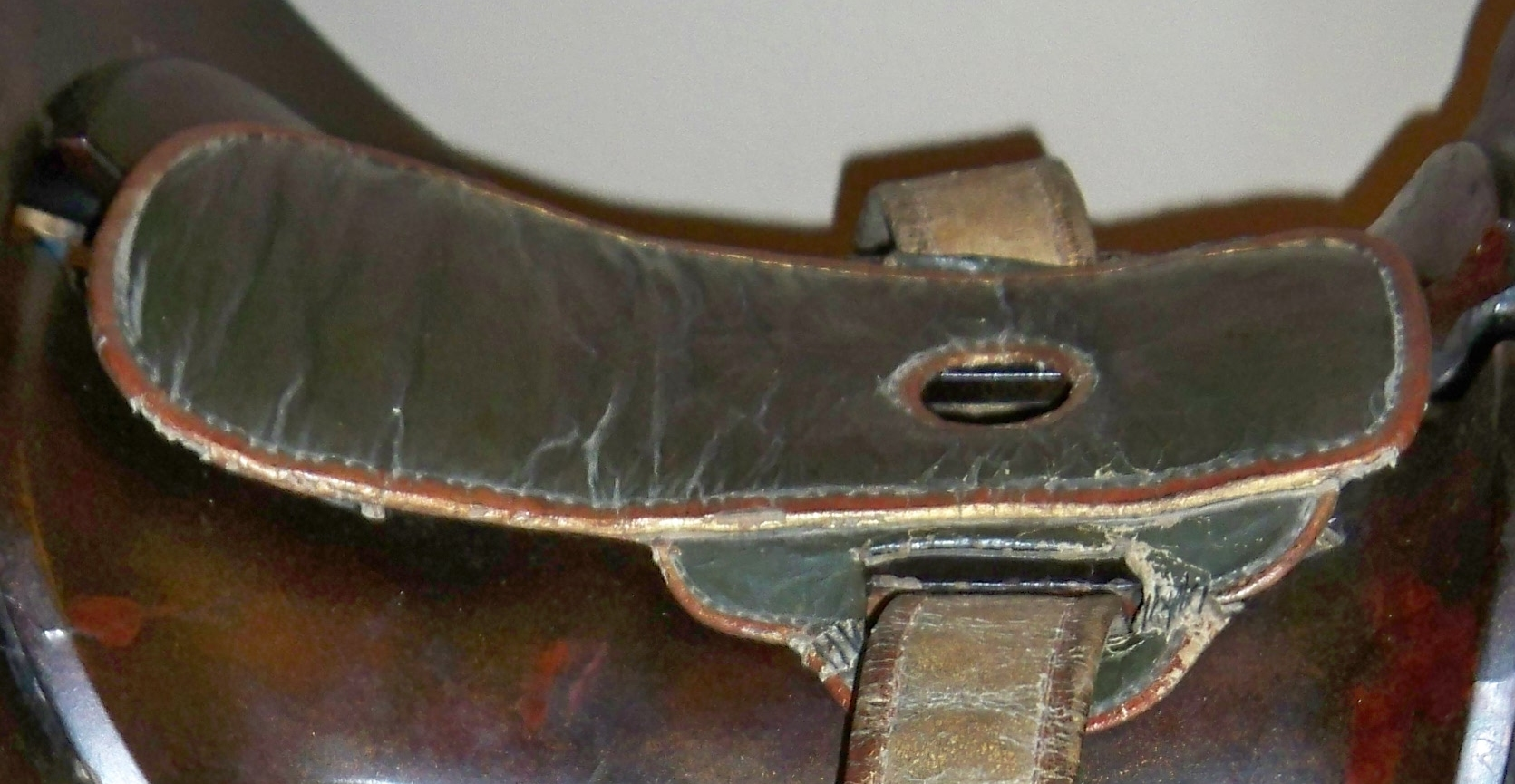

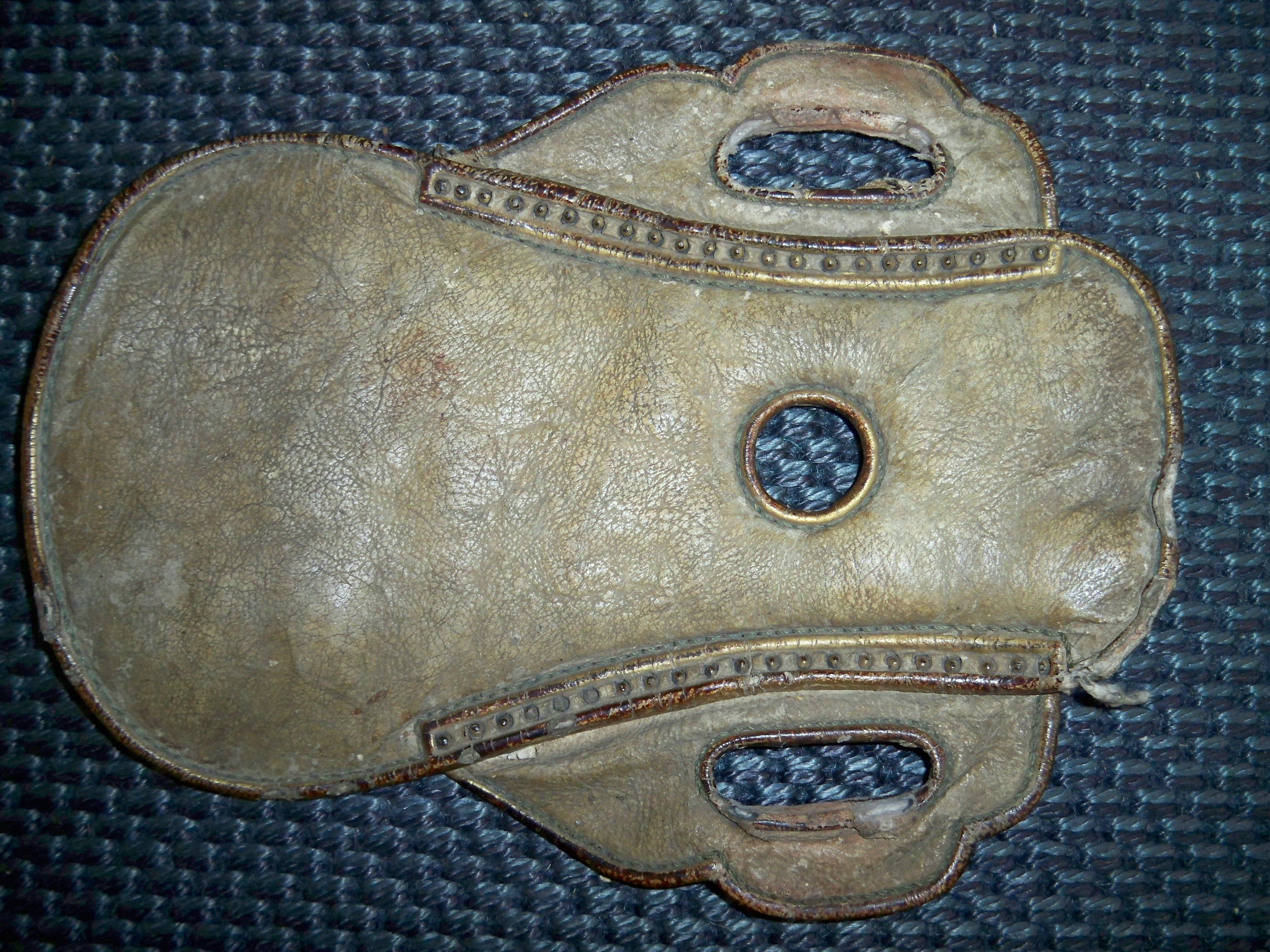

=== Aori ===
Aori (saddle flaps), a pair of large leather pieces that would hang from either side of the saddle (kura) and protect the sides of the horse from the abumi (stirrups) and from the branches of trees and shrubs.

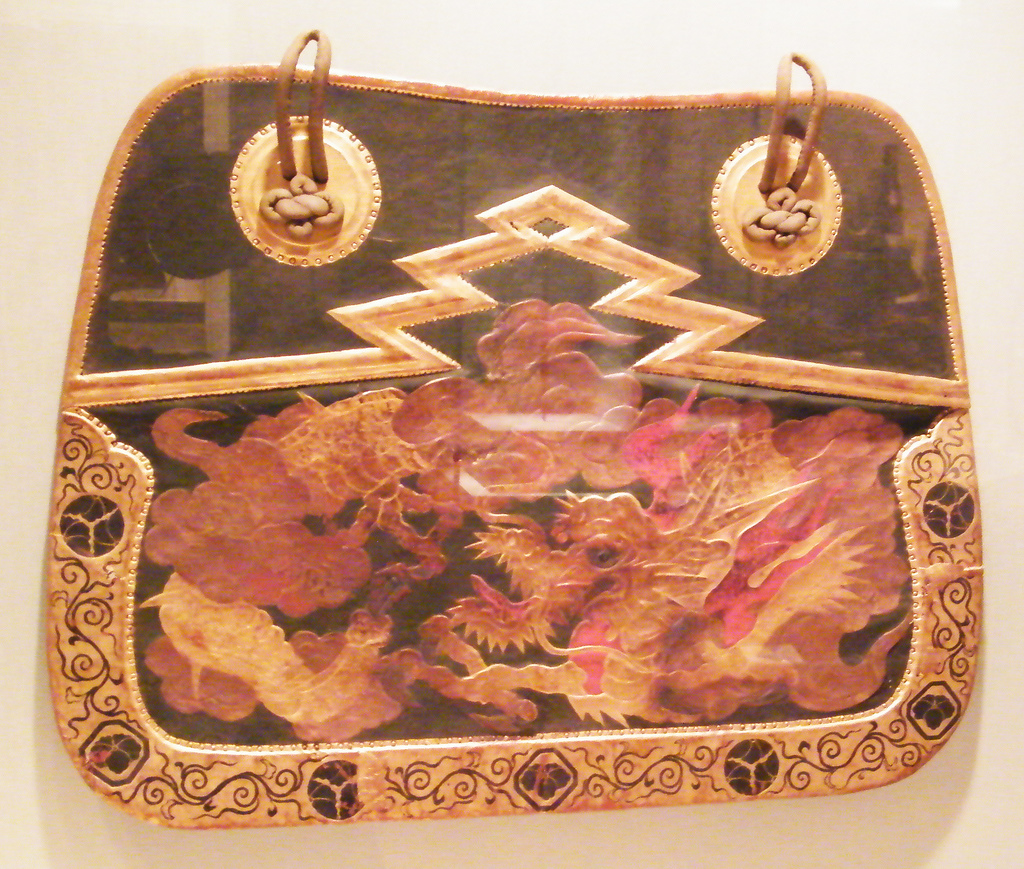

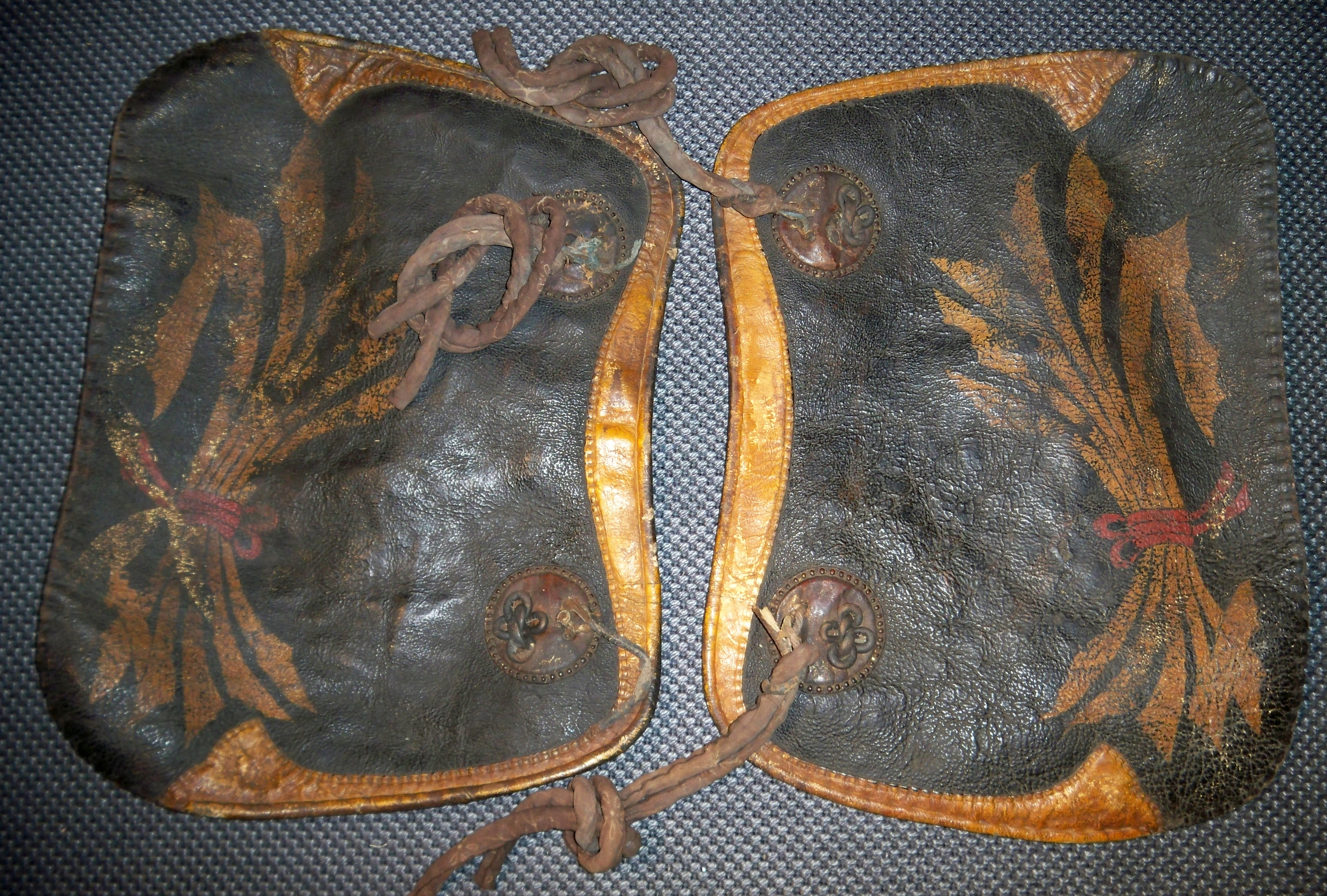

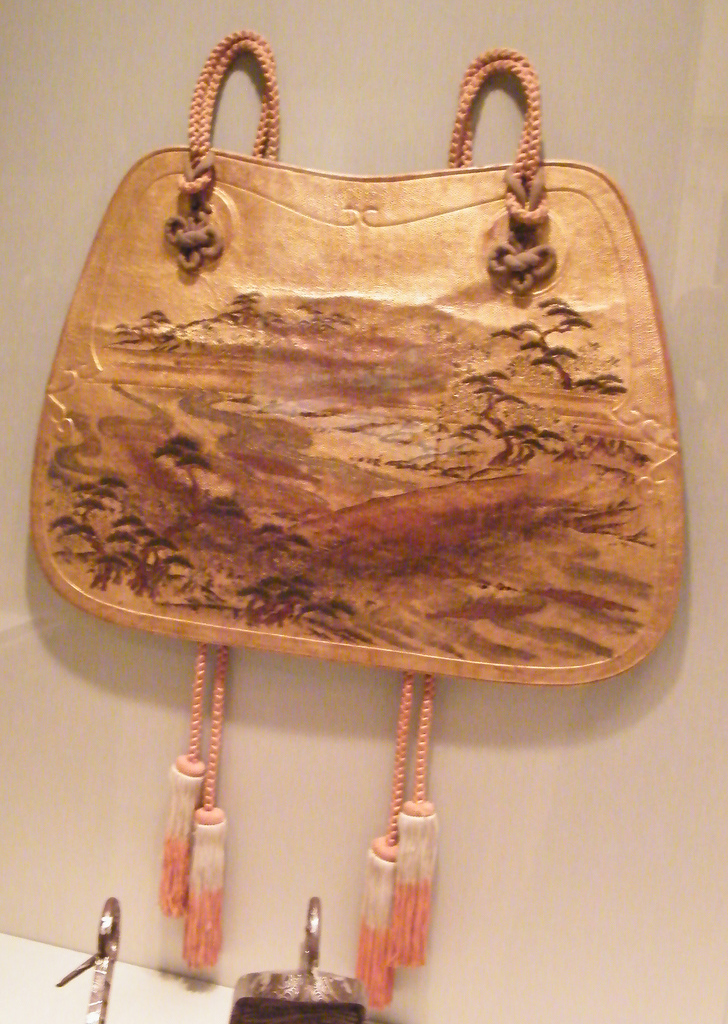

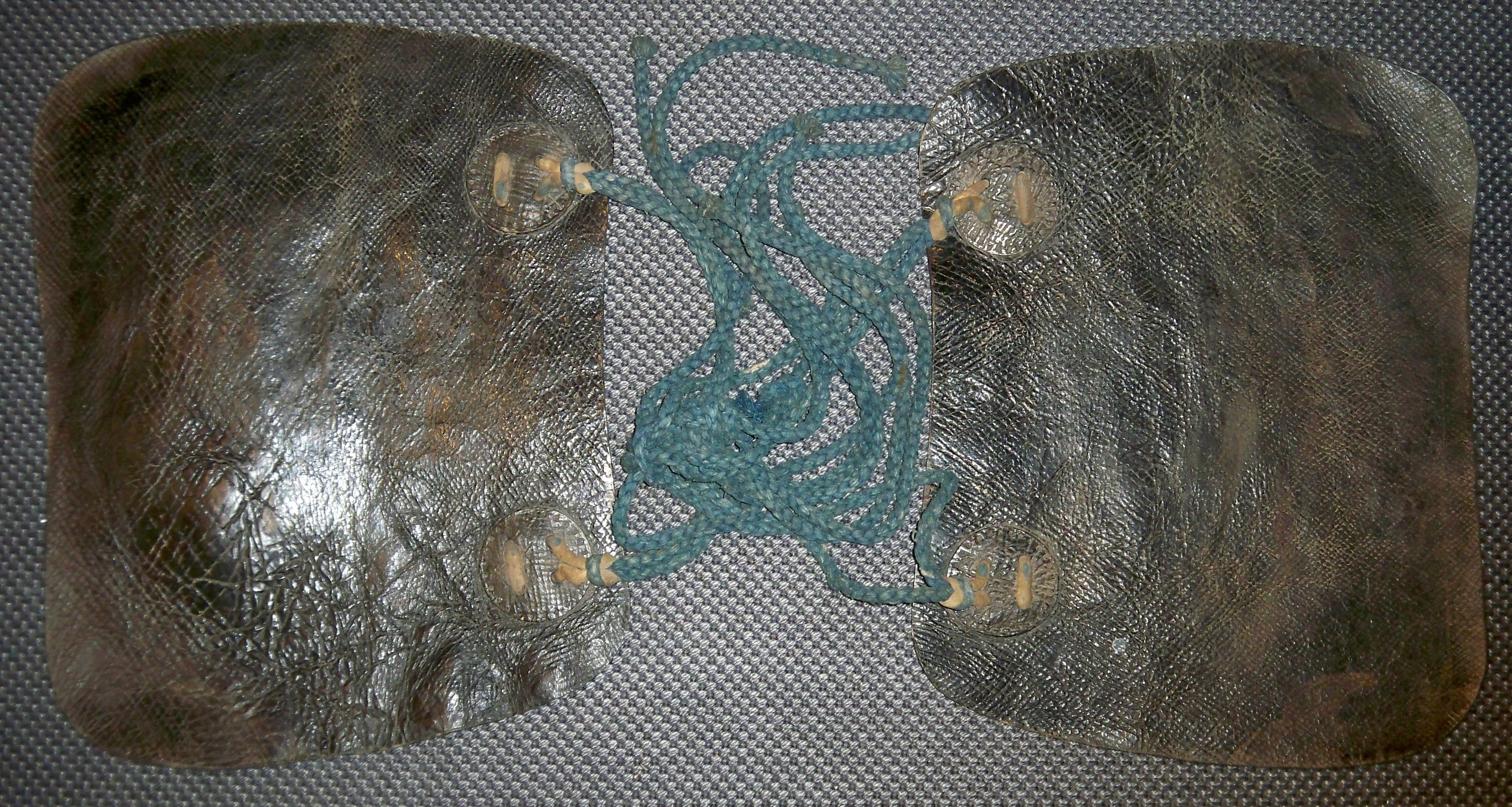

=== Shita-kura or hadazuke ===
Shita-kura or hadazuke, the twin set of double leather pads attached to the bottom of a Japanese saddle tree (kurabane). The shita-kura (hadazuke) protects the back of the horse from the kurabane.

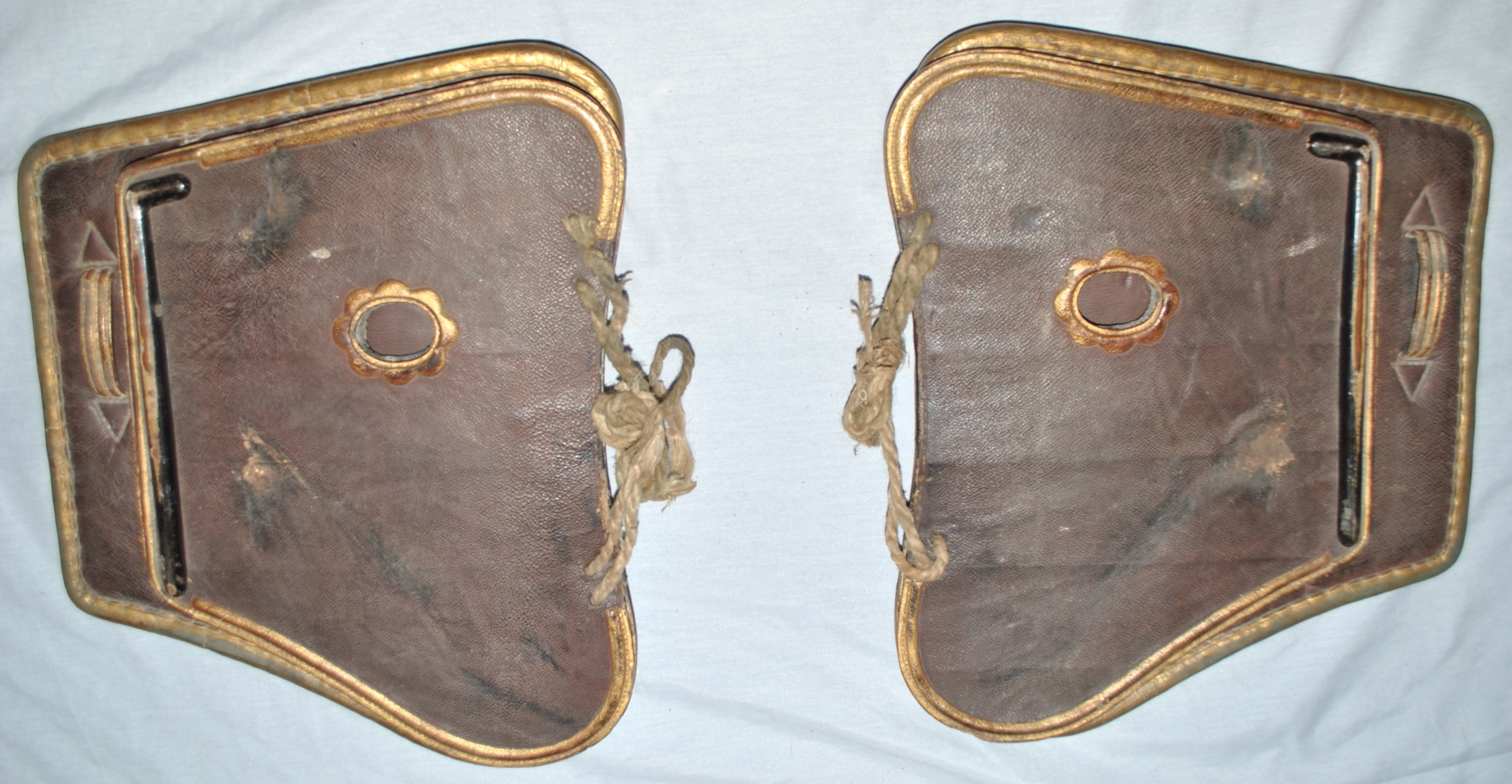

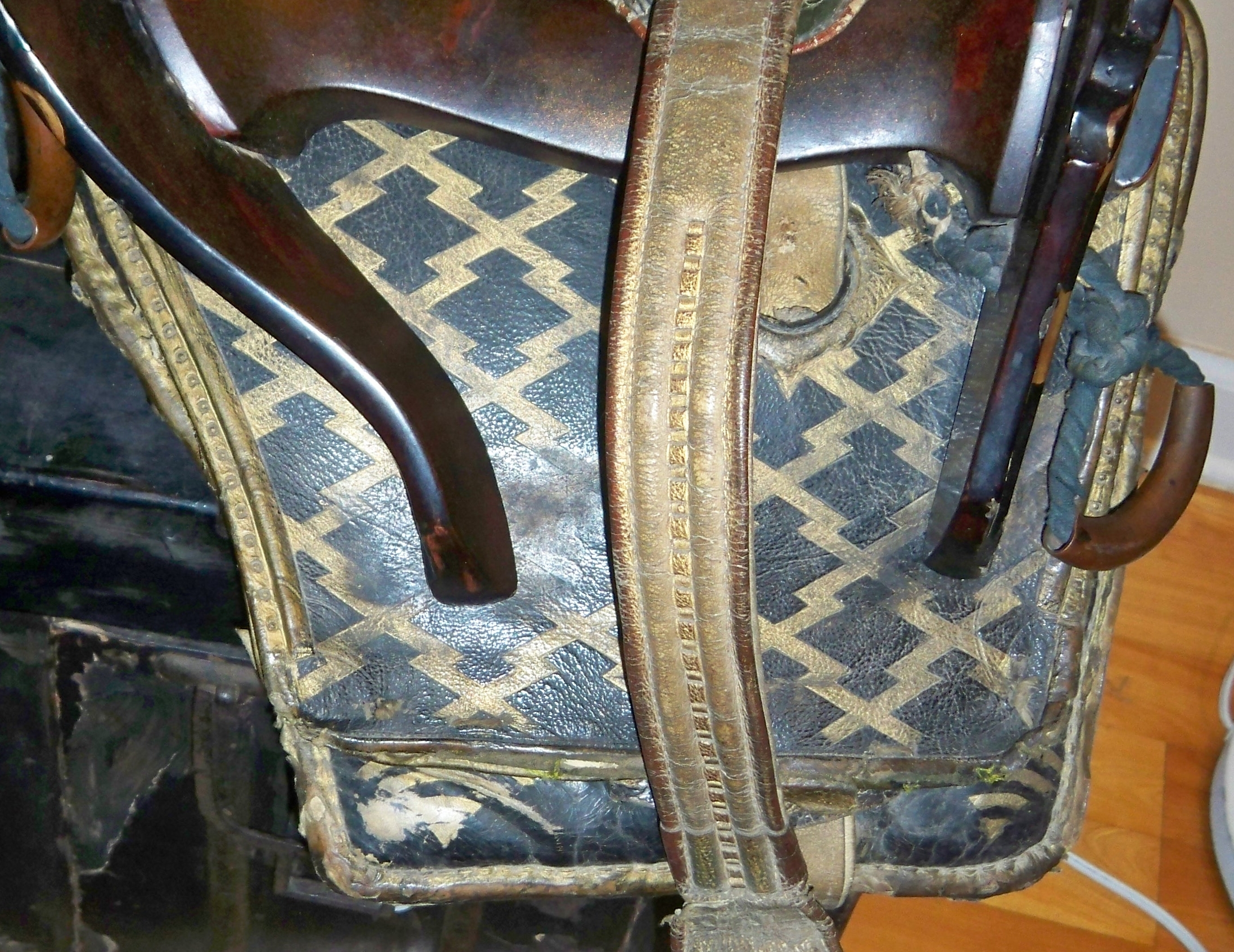

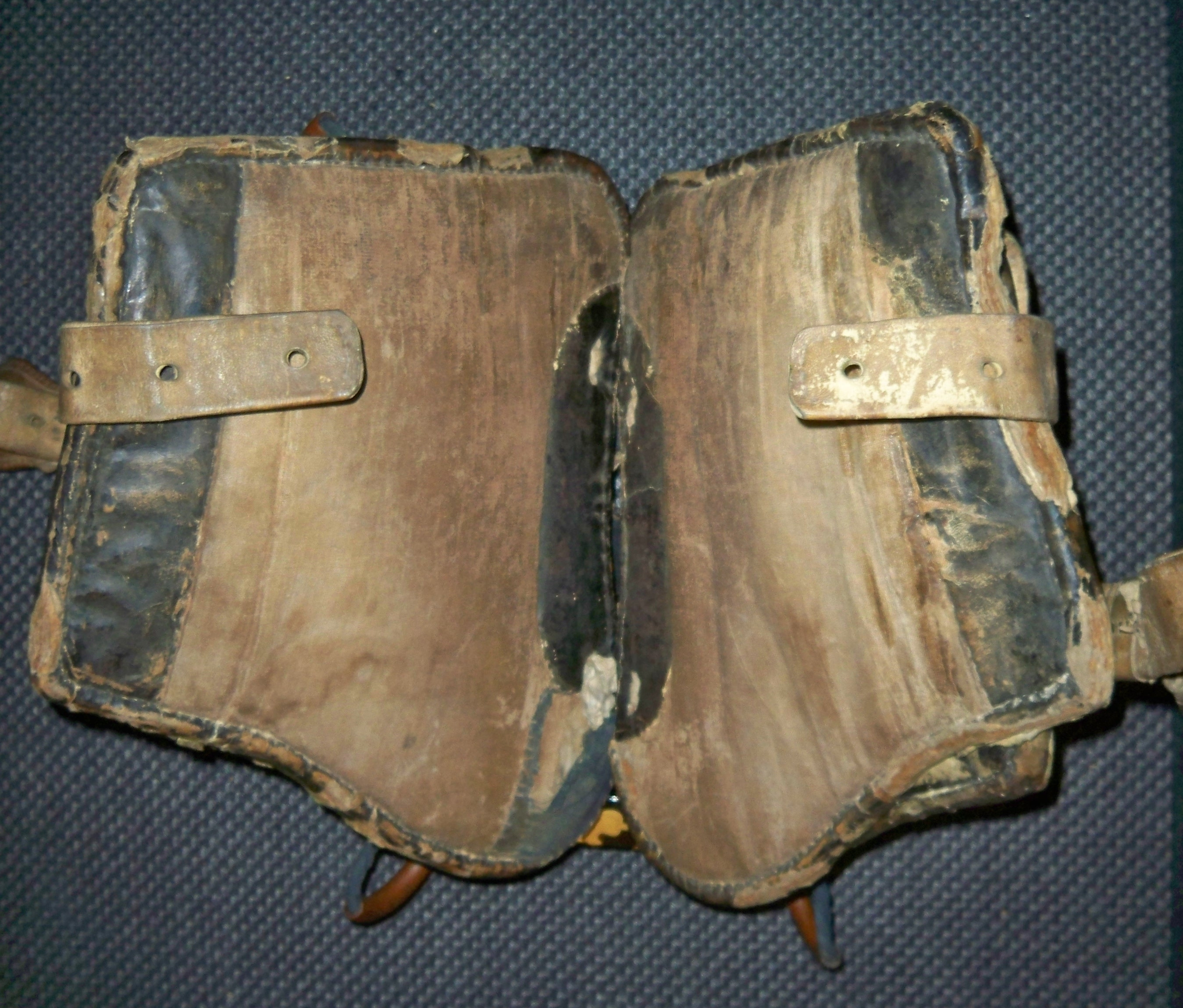

=== Abumi ===
Abumi (stirrups), the abumi are attached to the saddle (kura) by a pair of leather stirrup straps (chikara-gawa or gekiso).

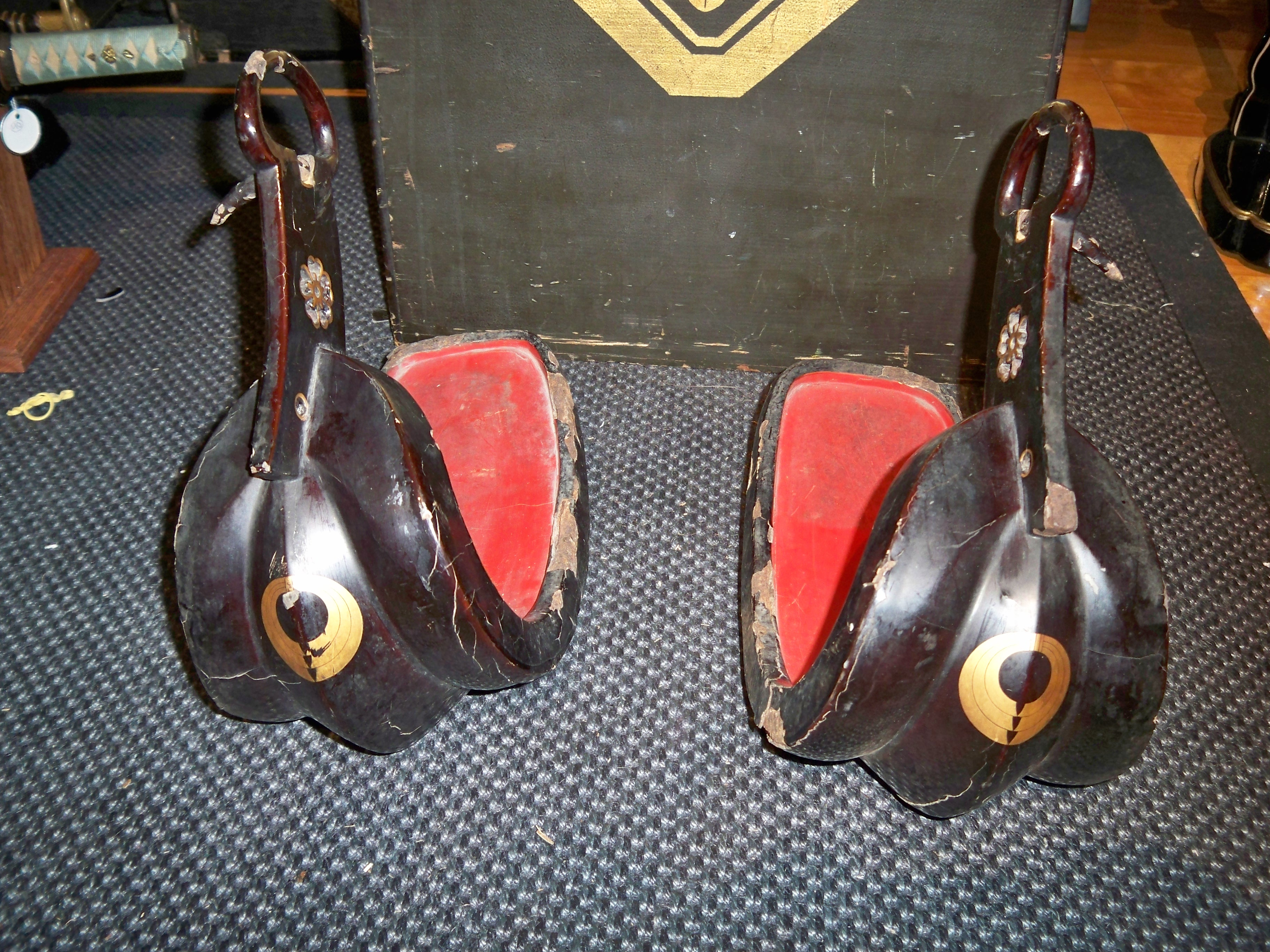

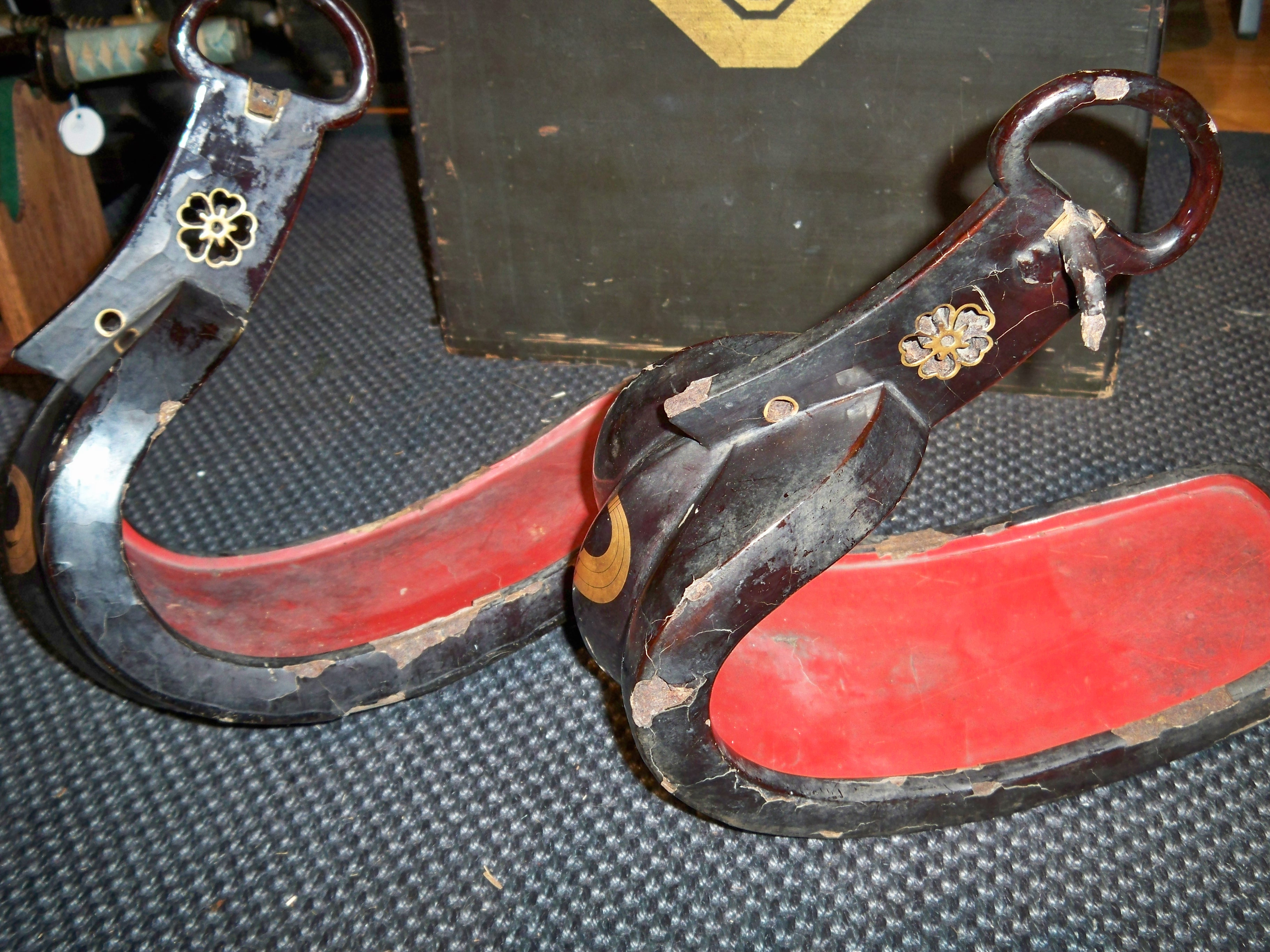

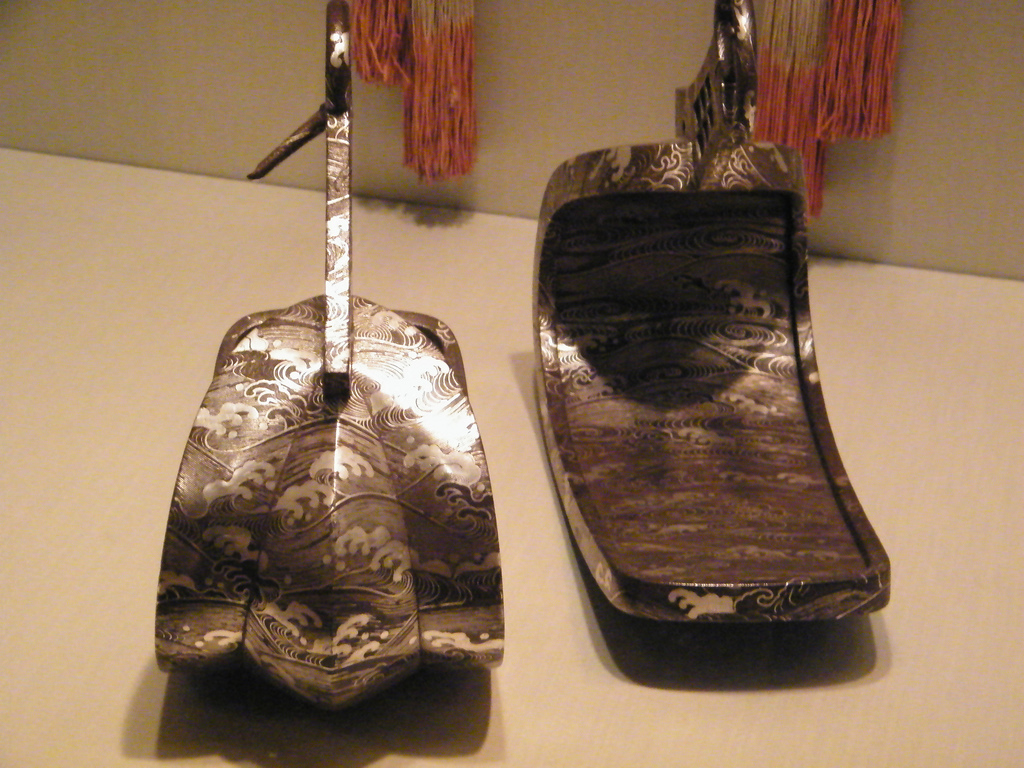

=== Chikara-gawa or gekiso ===
Chikara-gawa or gekiso (stirrup straps), leather straps that the stirrups (abumi) are attached to, they pass through slots on the saddle seat (basin or kura tsubo).

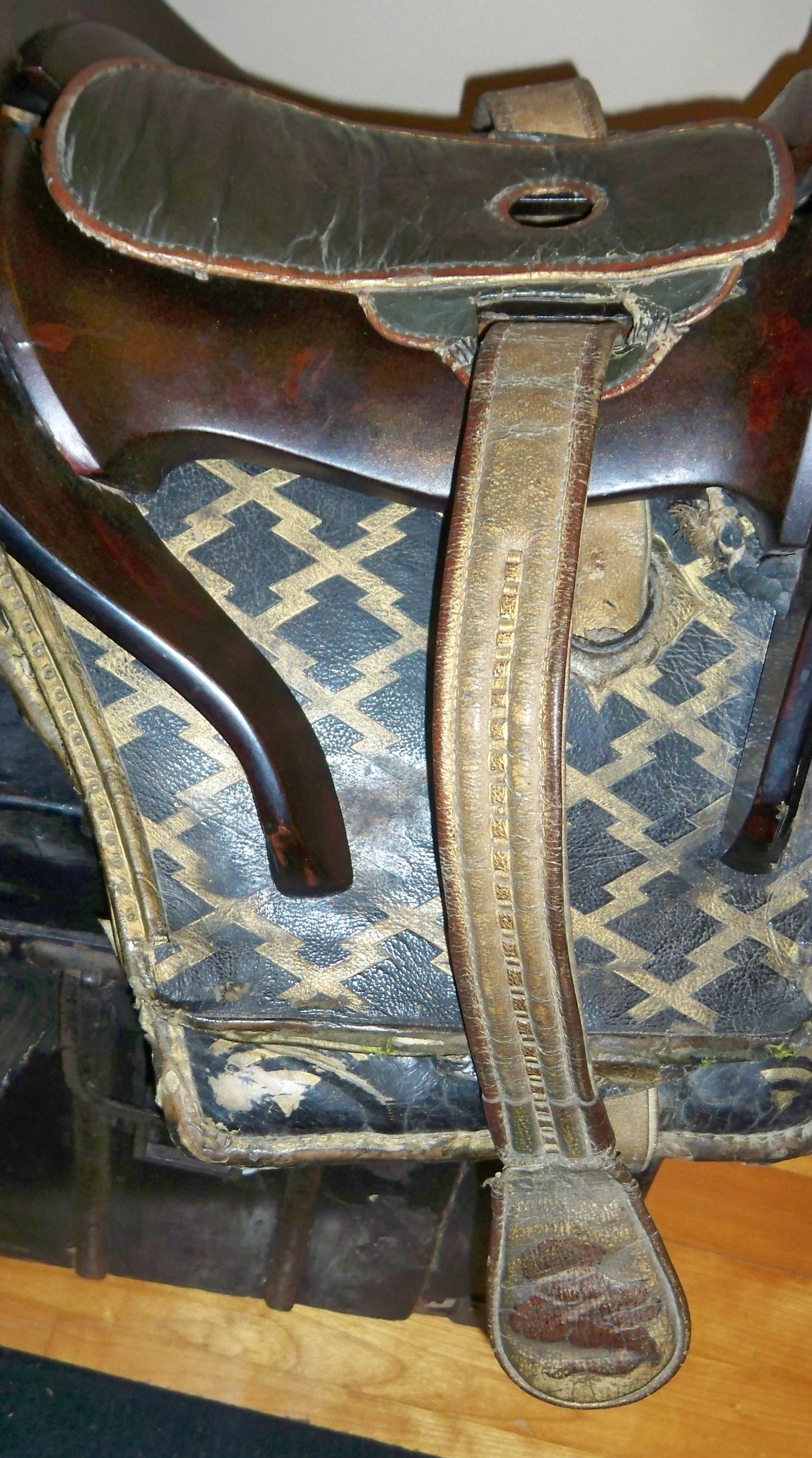

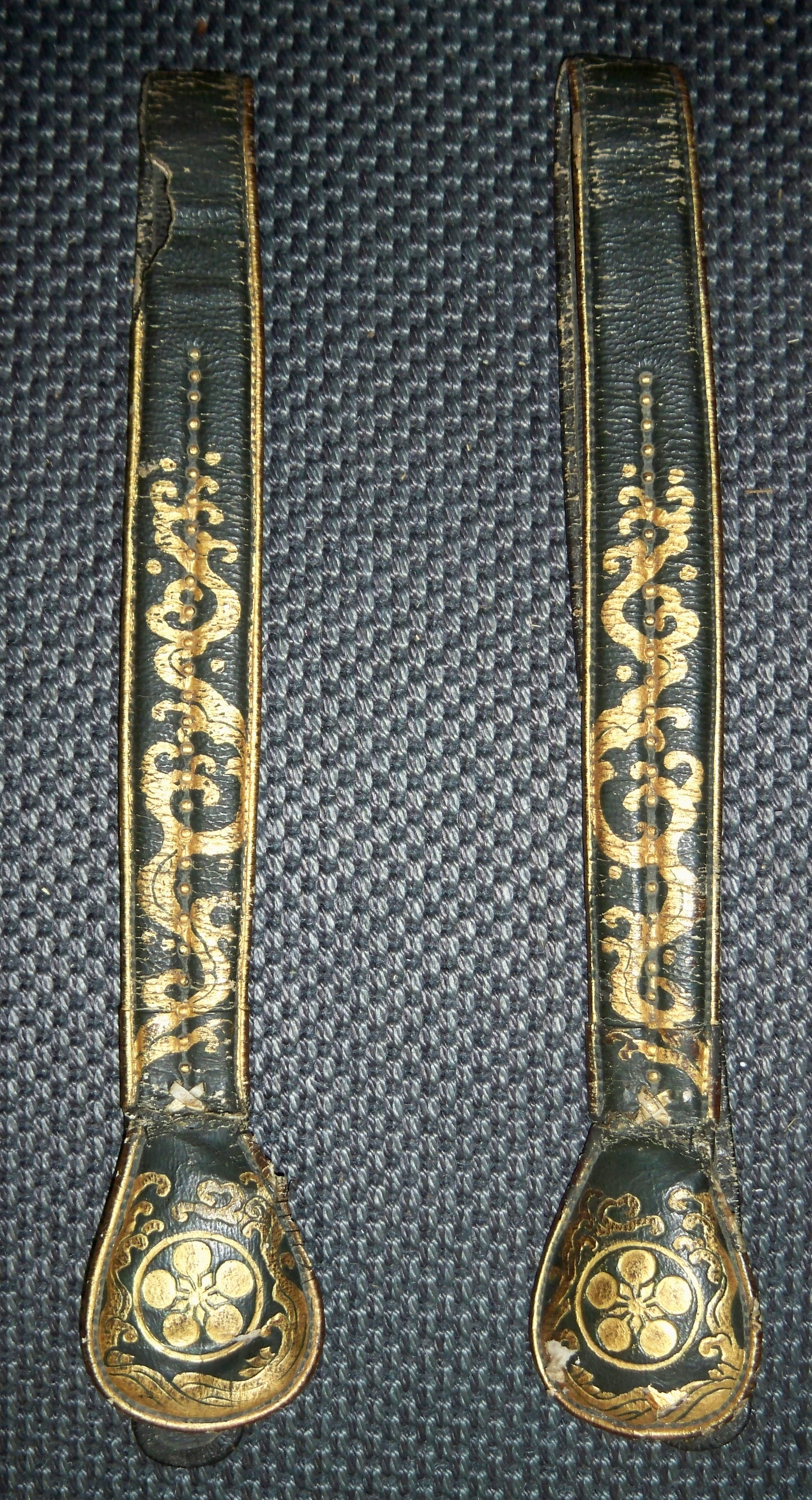

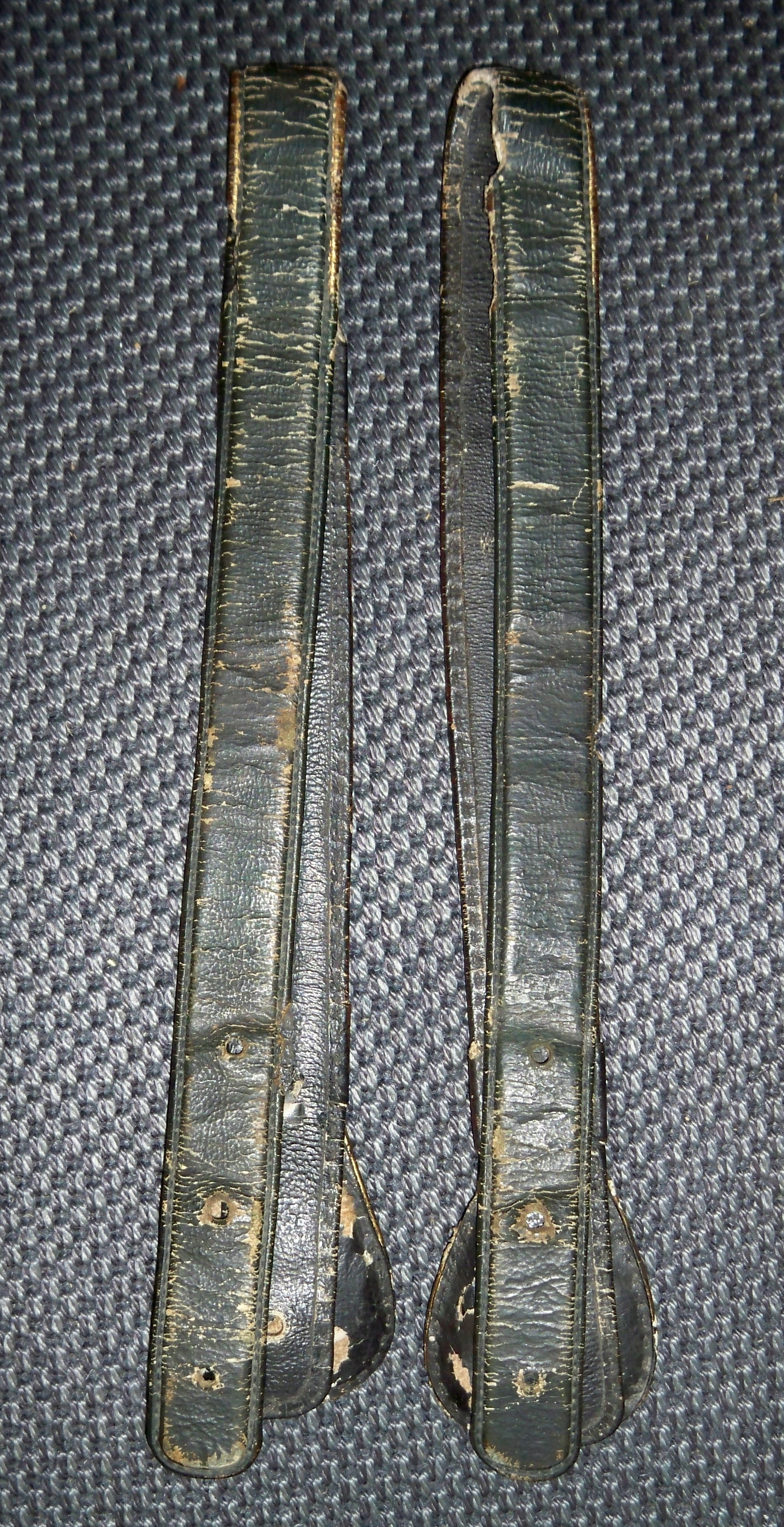

=== Shiode ===
Shiode, tie-downs attached to the kura (saddle) at four points. Various ropes and straps are attached to the shiode.

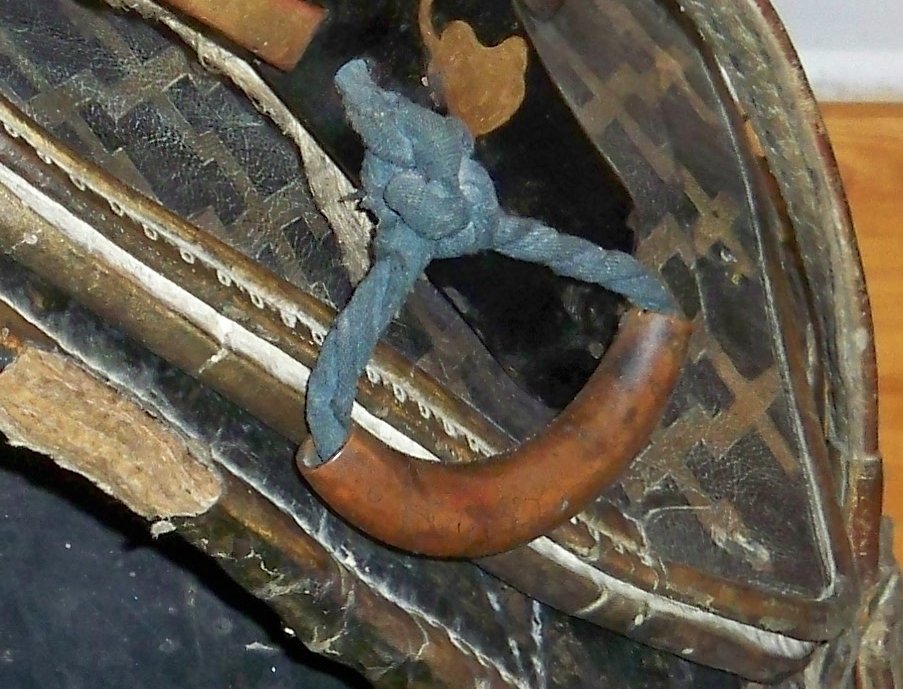

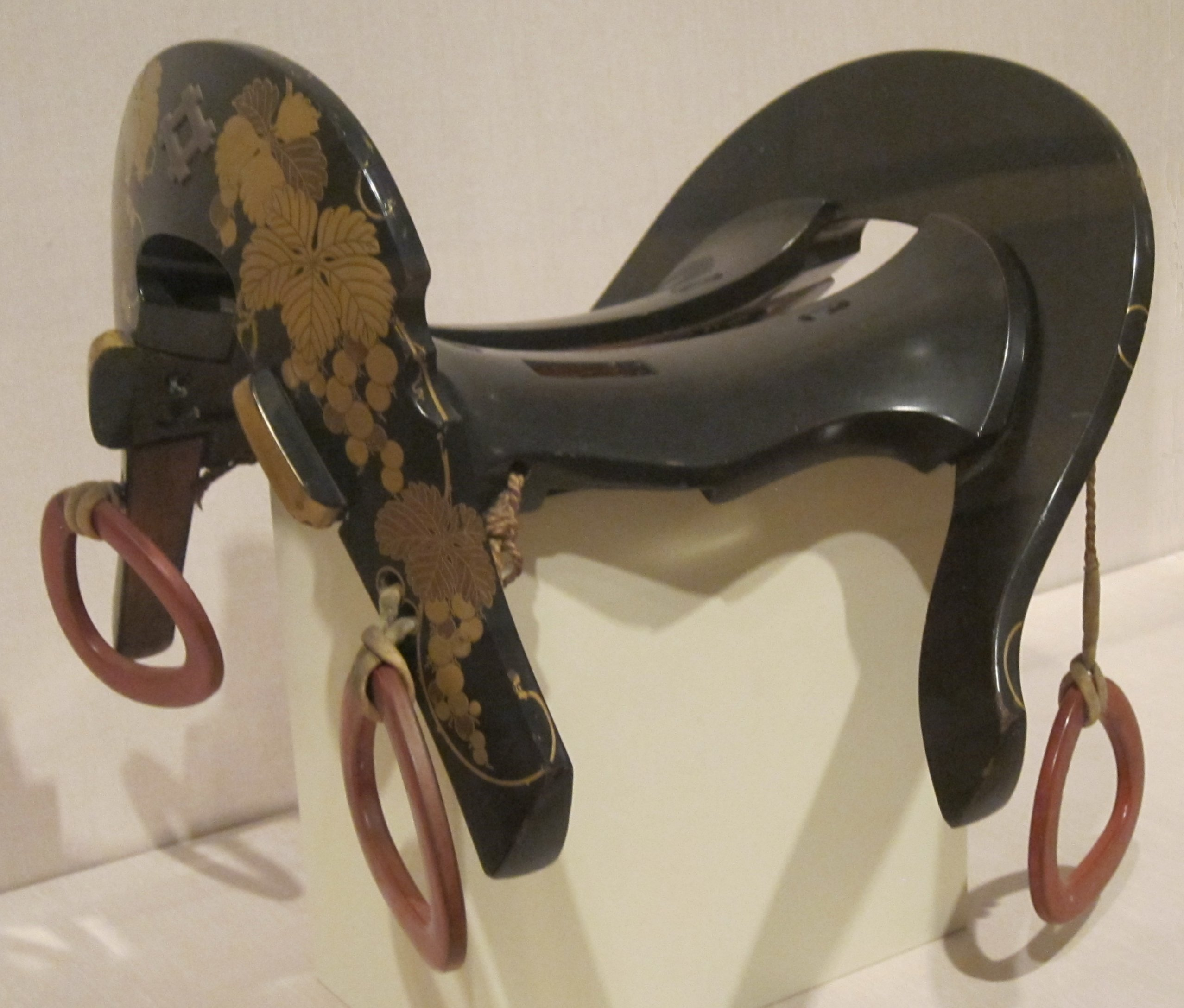

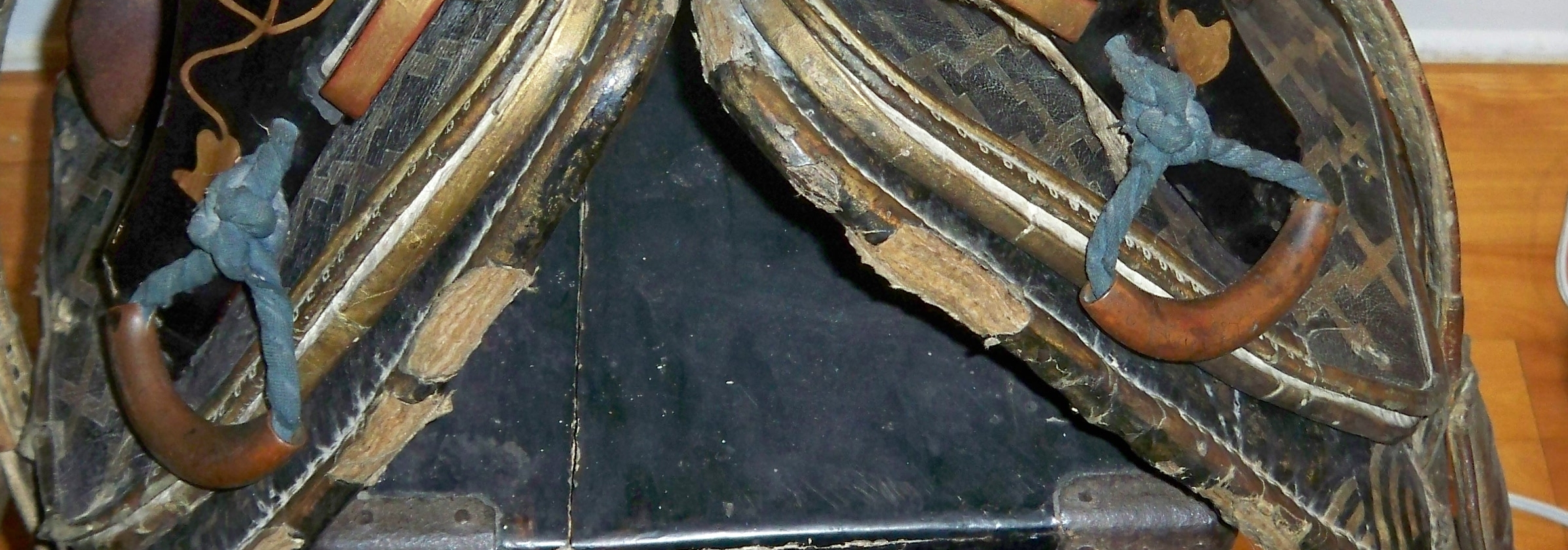

=== Uma agemaki ===
Uma agemaki, decorative tassels that are attached to a Japanese saddle (kura), other equipment may be attached to the uma agemaki.

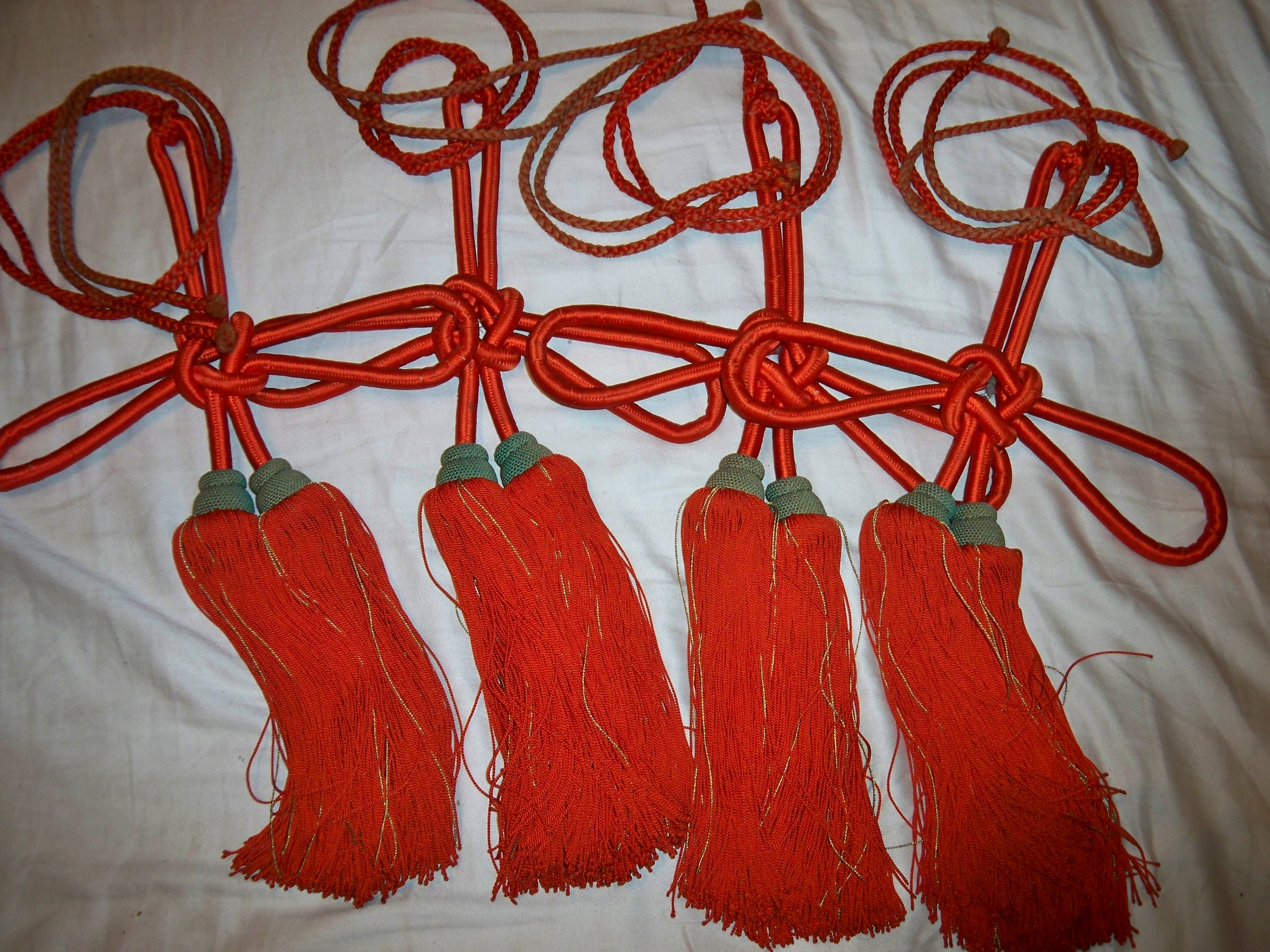

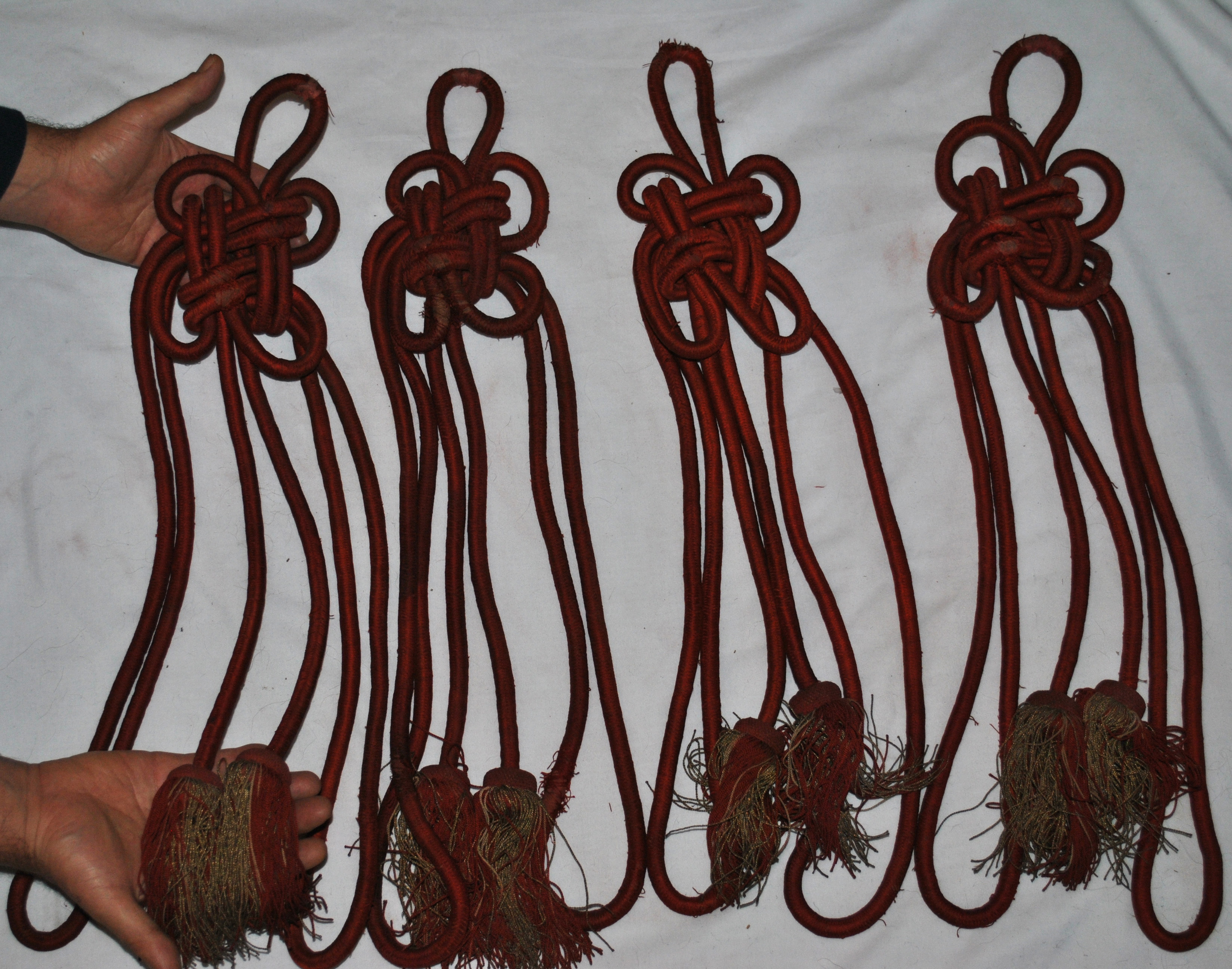

=== Bakin ===
Bakin, a padded cover that sits behind the kura (saddle) and covers the shirigai (crupper).

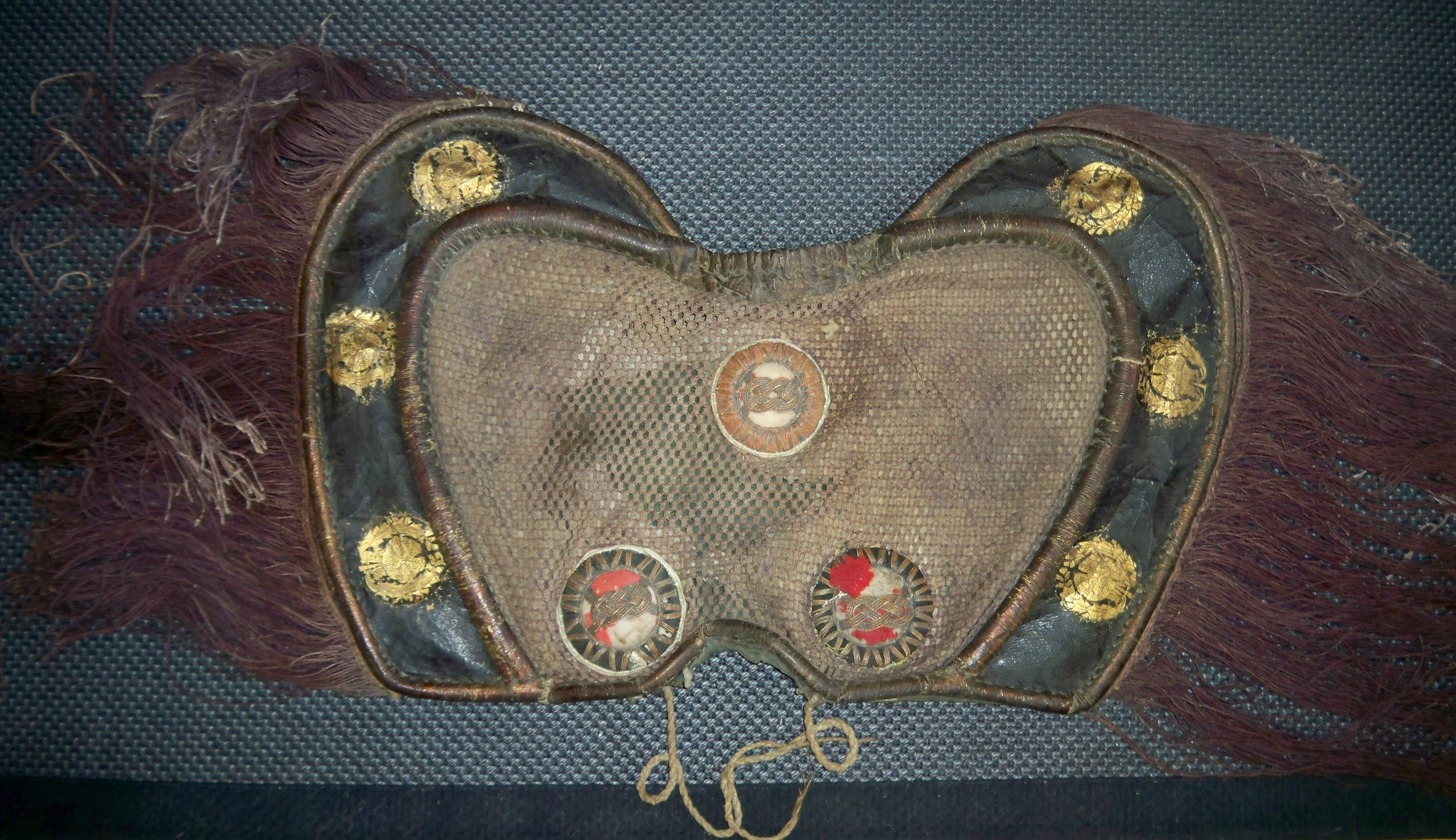

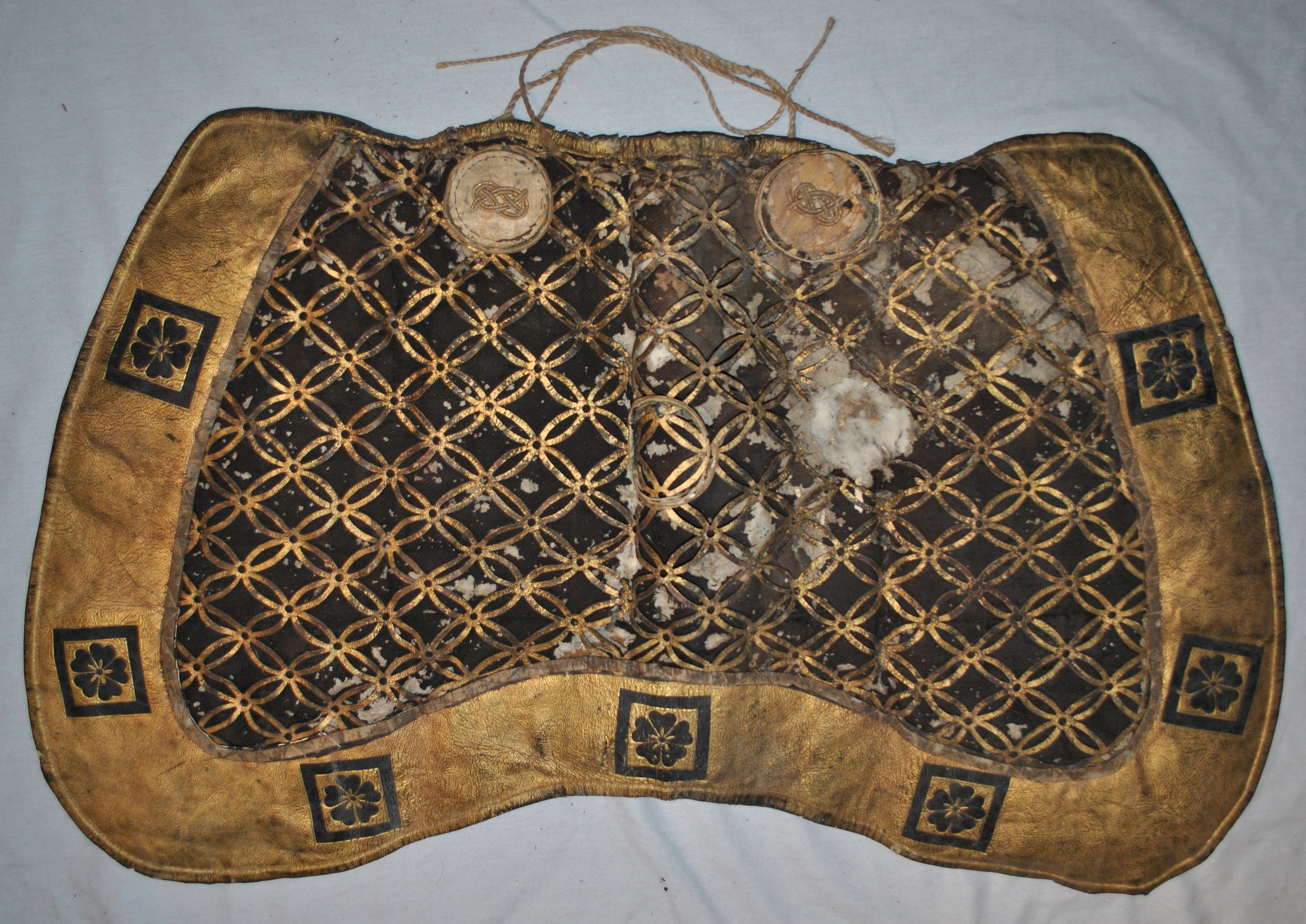

=== Shirigai ===
Shirigai, a type of crupper which connected to the kura (saddle) on one end and looped under the horse's tail on the other to keep the saddle from slipping forward.

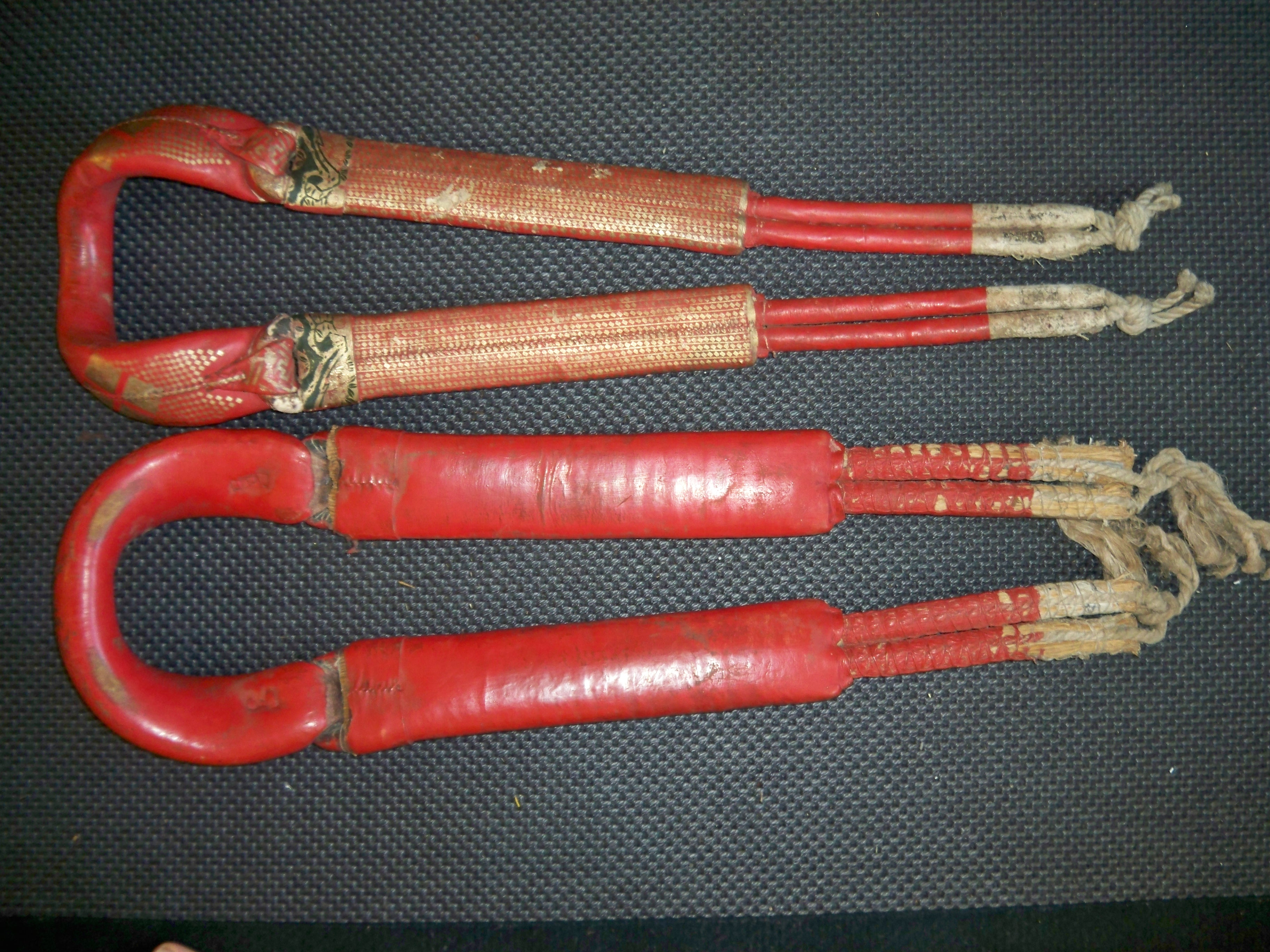

=== Kutsuwa (bit) ===
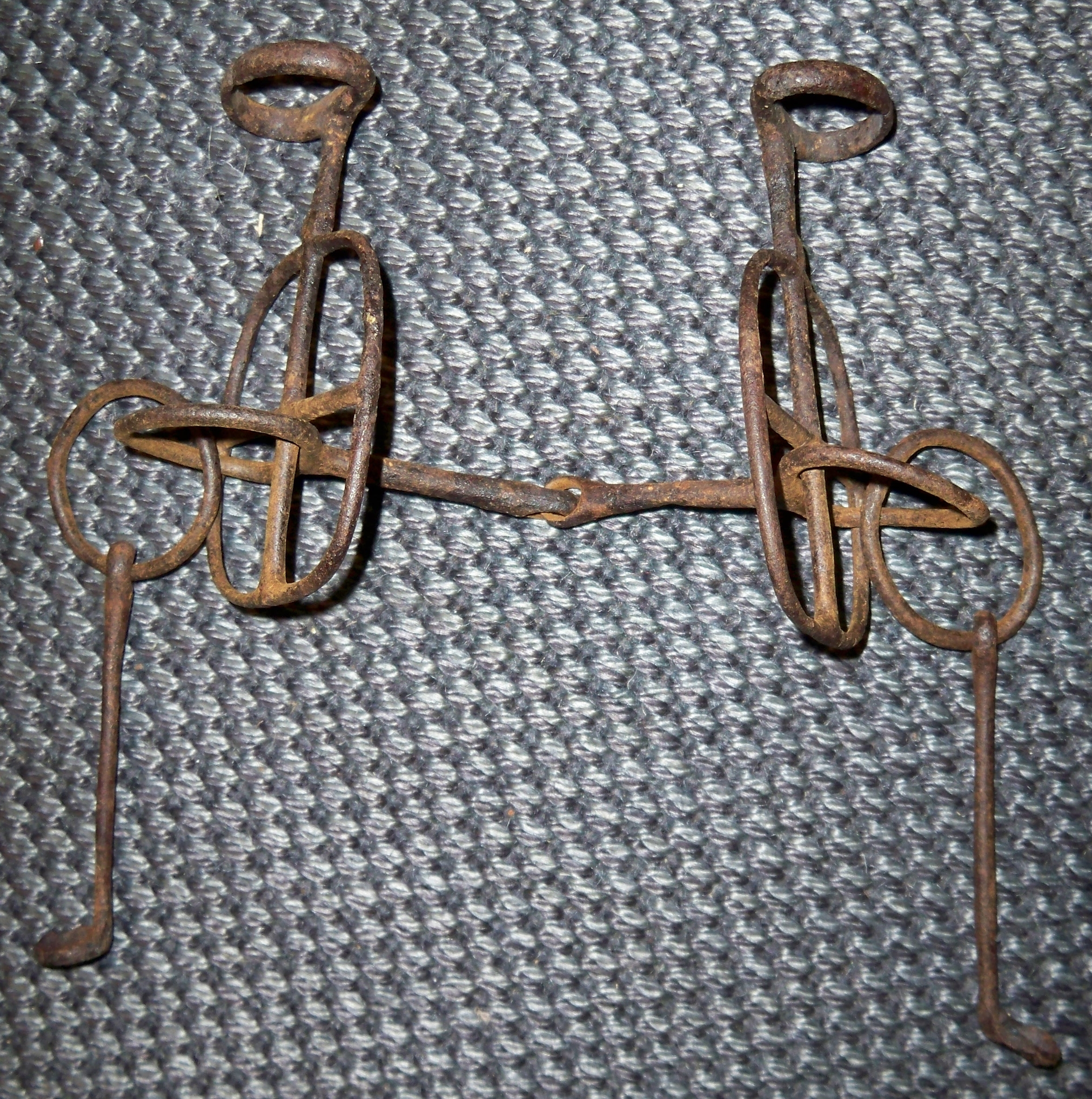

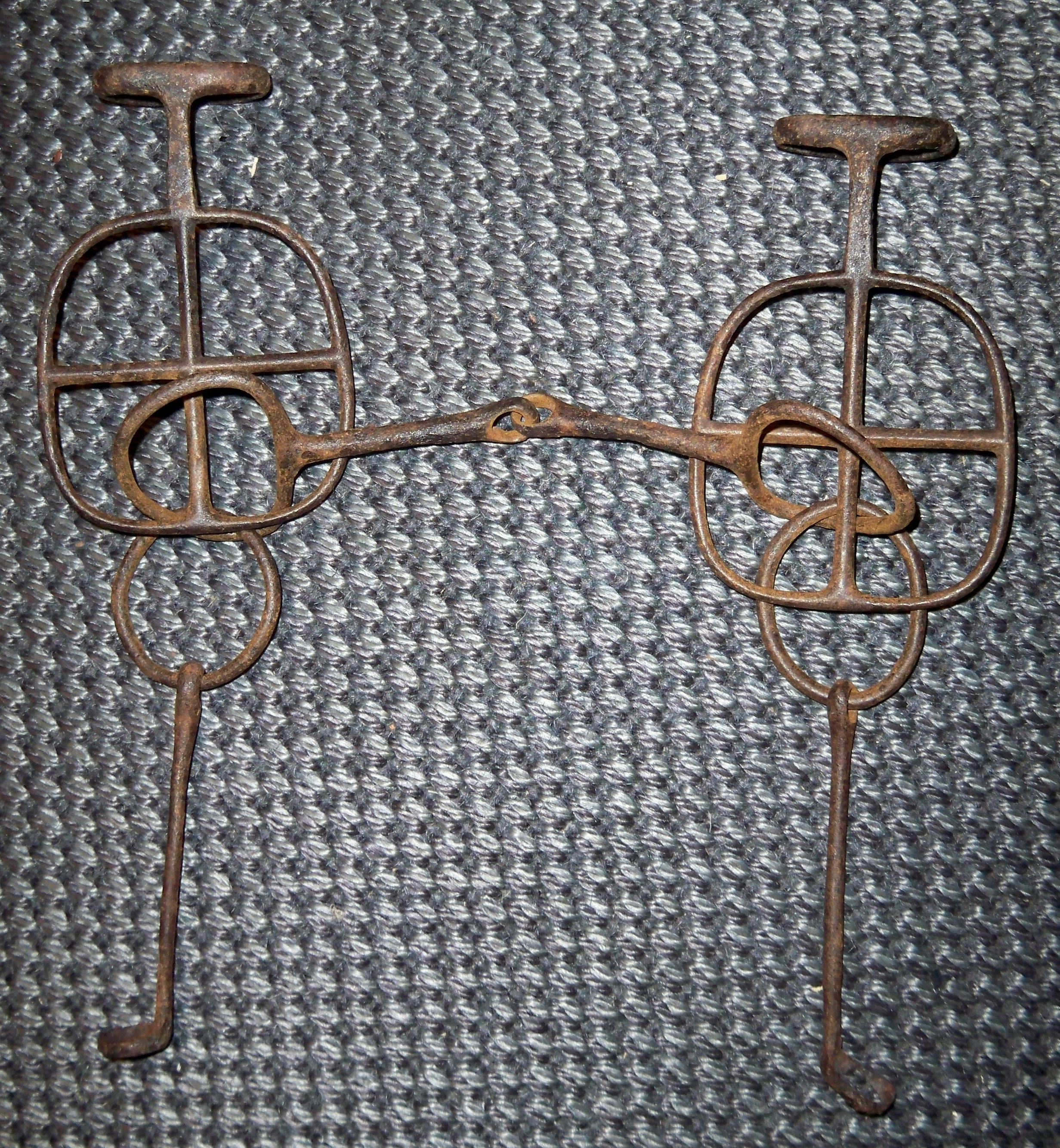

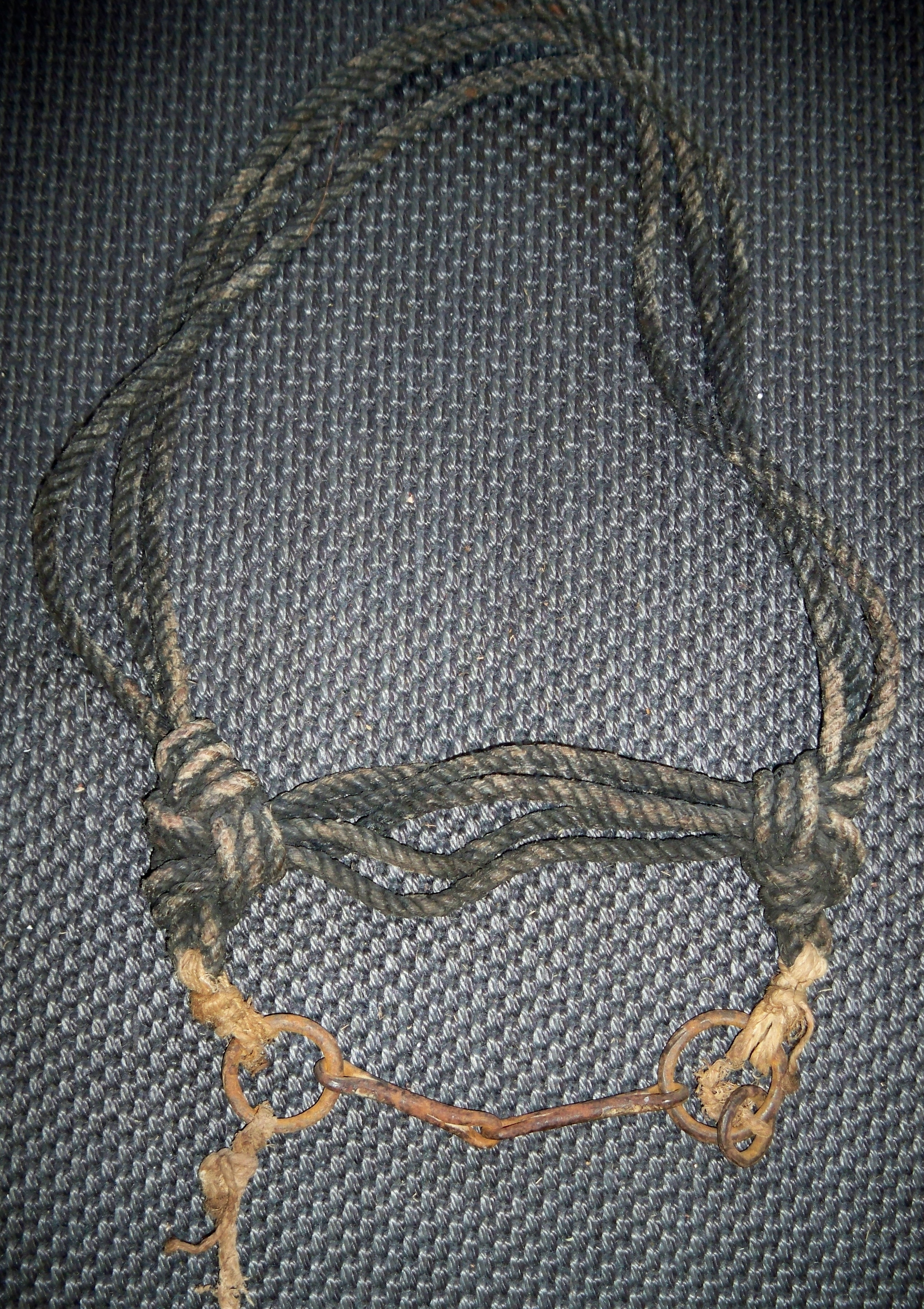

=== Kiritsuke (saddle blanket) ===
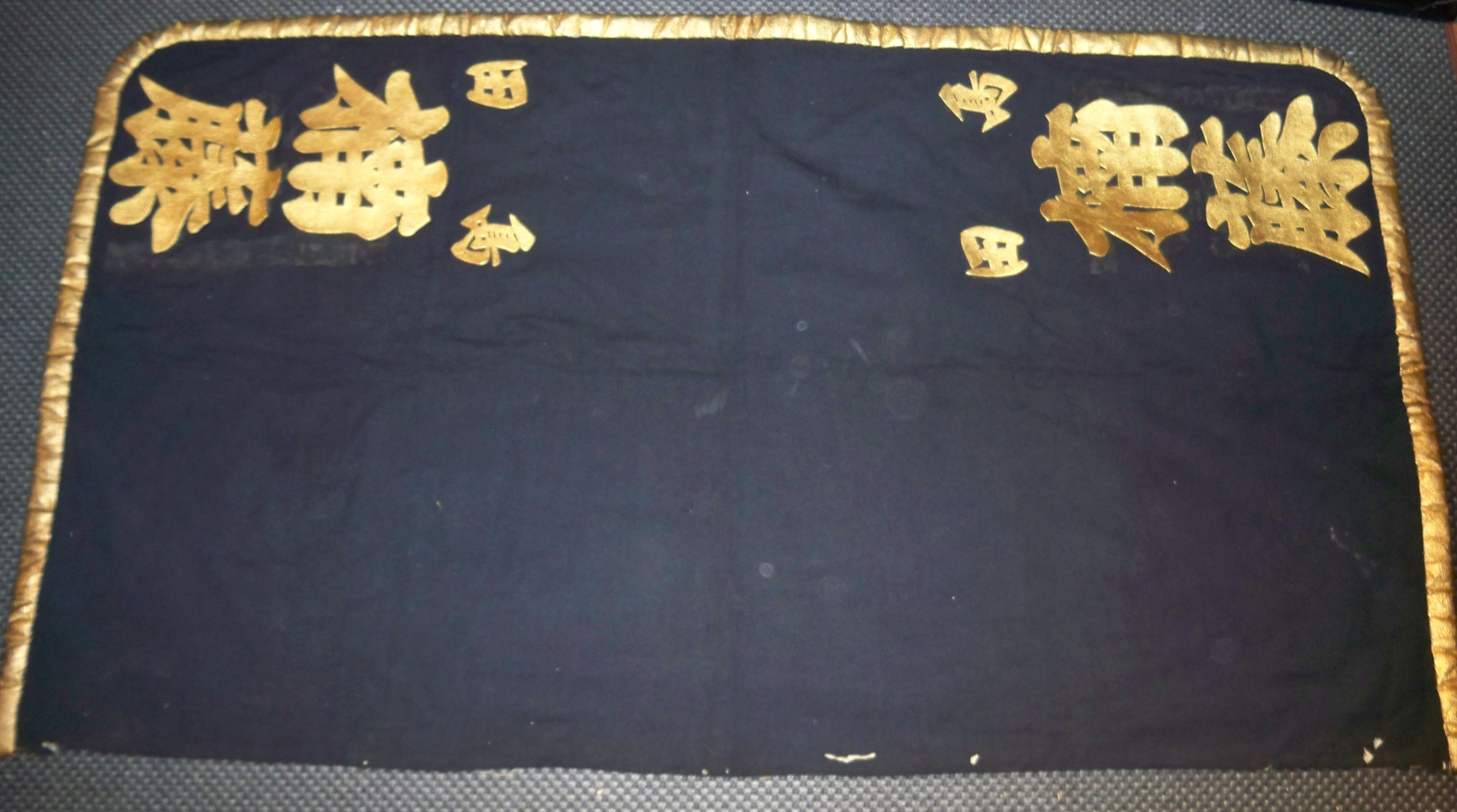

=== Sanjakugawa ===
Sanjakugawa, two leather straps that wrapped around each side of the neck, attached to the bridle and the bit. The sanjakugawa prevented the bridle from slipping over the ears.

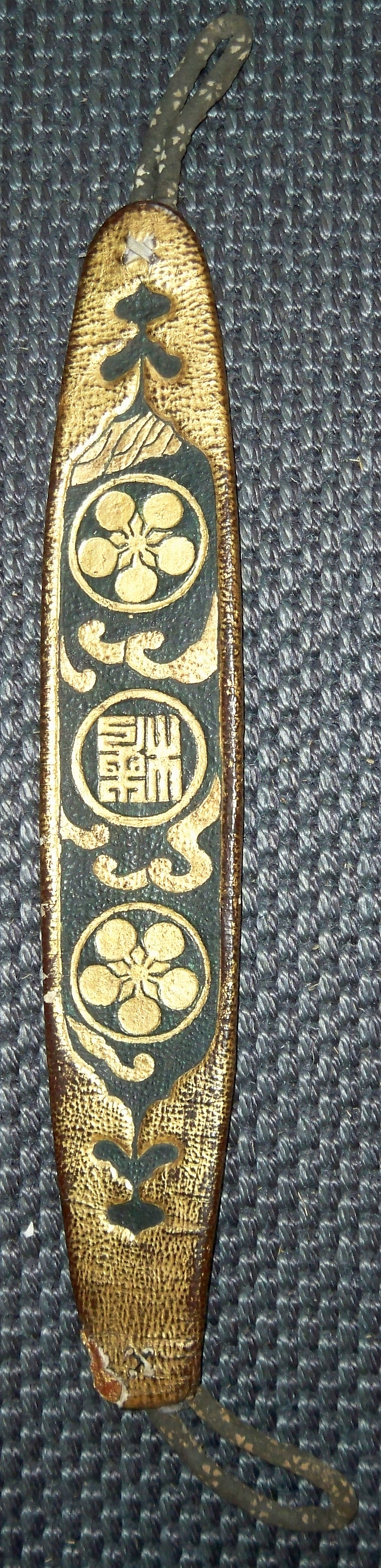

=== Muchi (whip) ===
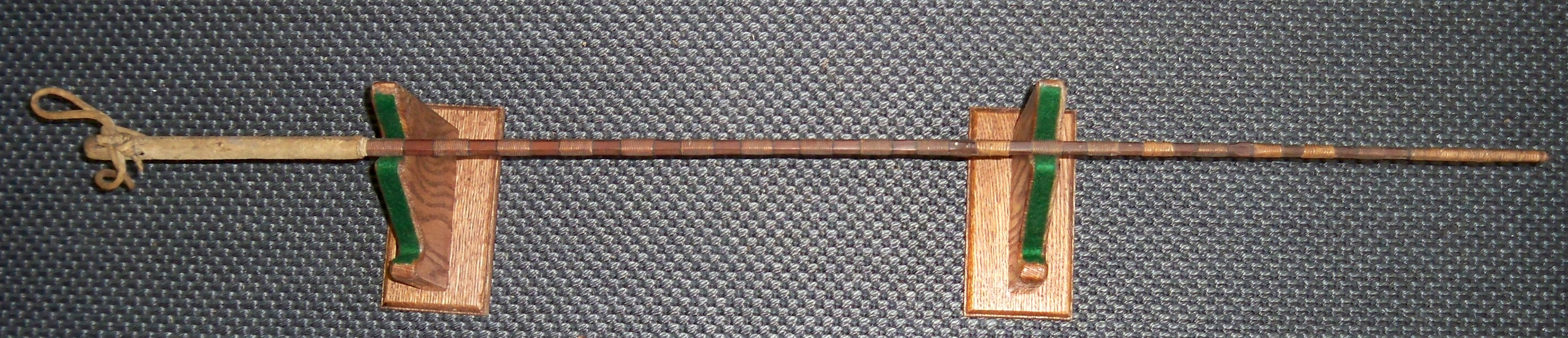
Antique Japanese horse whip

== See also ==
- Yabusame (Japanese archery on horseback)
