= Abumi (stirrup) =

Japanese traditional stirrup

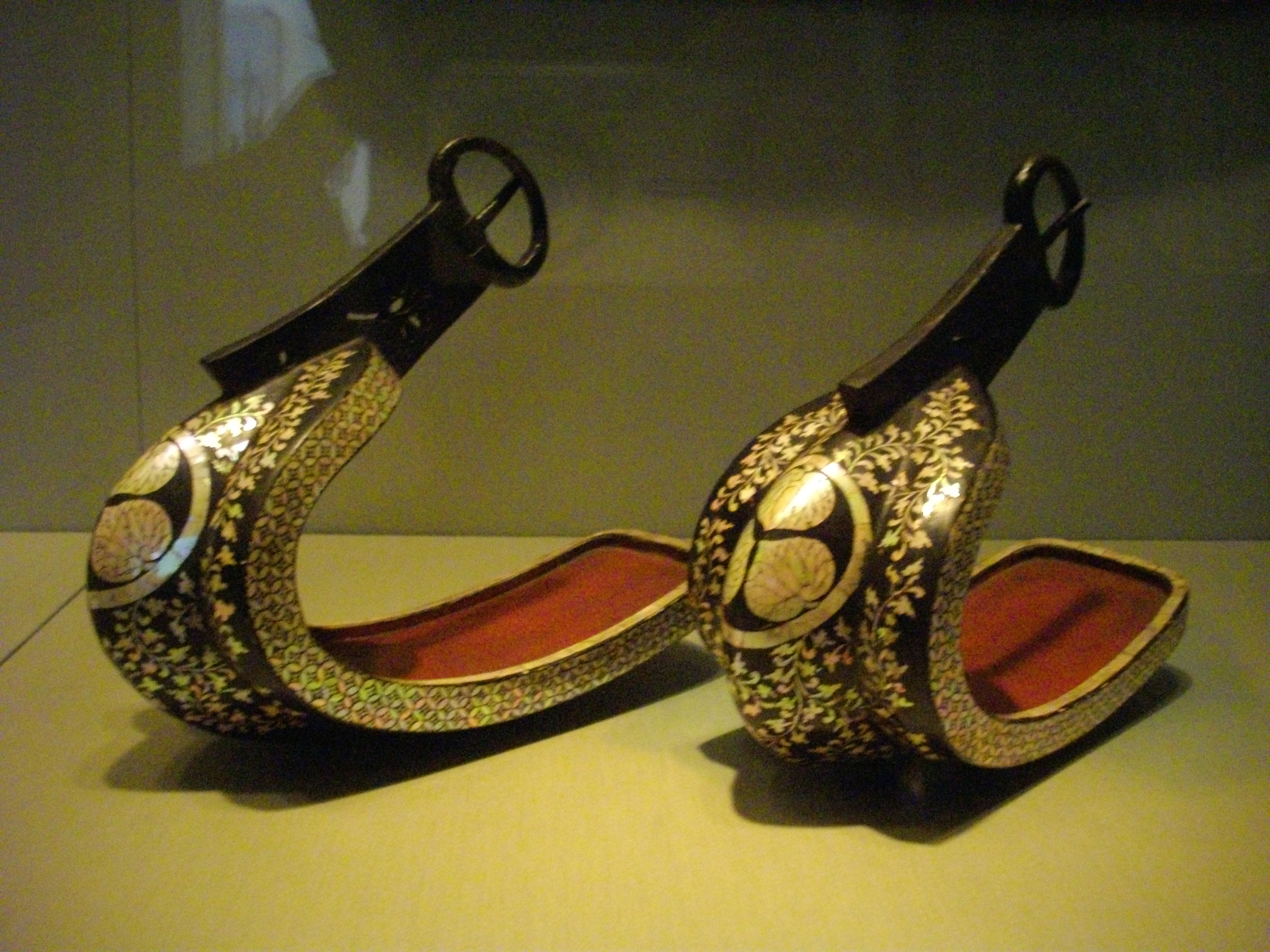
Antique Edo period Japanese (samurai) abumi (stirrup)

Abumi (鐙), Japanese stirrups, were used in Japan as early as the 5th century, and were a necessary component along with the Japanese saddle (kura) for the use of horses in warfare. Abumi became the type of stirrup used by the samurai class of feudal Japan.

== History ==
Early abumi were flat-bottomed rings of metal-covered wood, similar to European stirrups. The earliest known examples were excavated from tombs. Cup-shaped stirrups (tsubo abumi) that enclosed the front half of the rider's foot eventually replaced the earlier design.

During the Nara period, the base of the stirrup which supported the rider's sole was elongated past the toe cup. This half-tongued style of stirrup (hanshita abumi) remained in use until the late Heian period (794 to 1185) when a new stirrup was developed. The fukuro abumi or musashi abumi had a base that extended the full length of the rider's foot and the right and left sides of the toe cup were removed. The open sides were designed to prevent the rider from catching a foot in the stirrup and being dragged.

The military version of this open-sided stirrup, called the shitanaga abumi, was in use by the middle Heian period. It was thinner, had a deeper toe pocket and an even longer and flatter foot shelf. It is not known why the Japanese developed this unique style of stirrup, but this stirrup stayed in use until European style-stirrups were introduced in the late 19th century. The abumi had a distinctive swan-like shape, curved up and backward at the front so as to bring the loop for the leather strap over the instep and achieve a correct balance. Most of the surviving specimens from this period are made entirely of iron, inlaid with designs of silver or other materials, and covered with lacquer. In some cases, there is an iron rod from the loop to the footplate near the heel to prevent the foot from slipping out. The footplates are occasionally perforated to let out water when crossing rivers, and these types are called suiba abumi. There are also abumi with holes in the front forming sockets for a lance or banner.

== Gallery ==
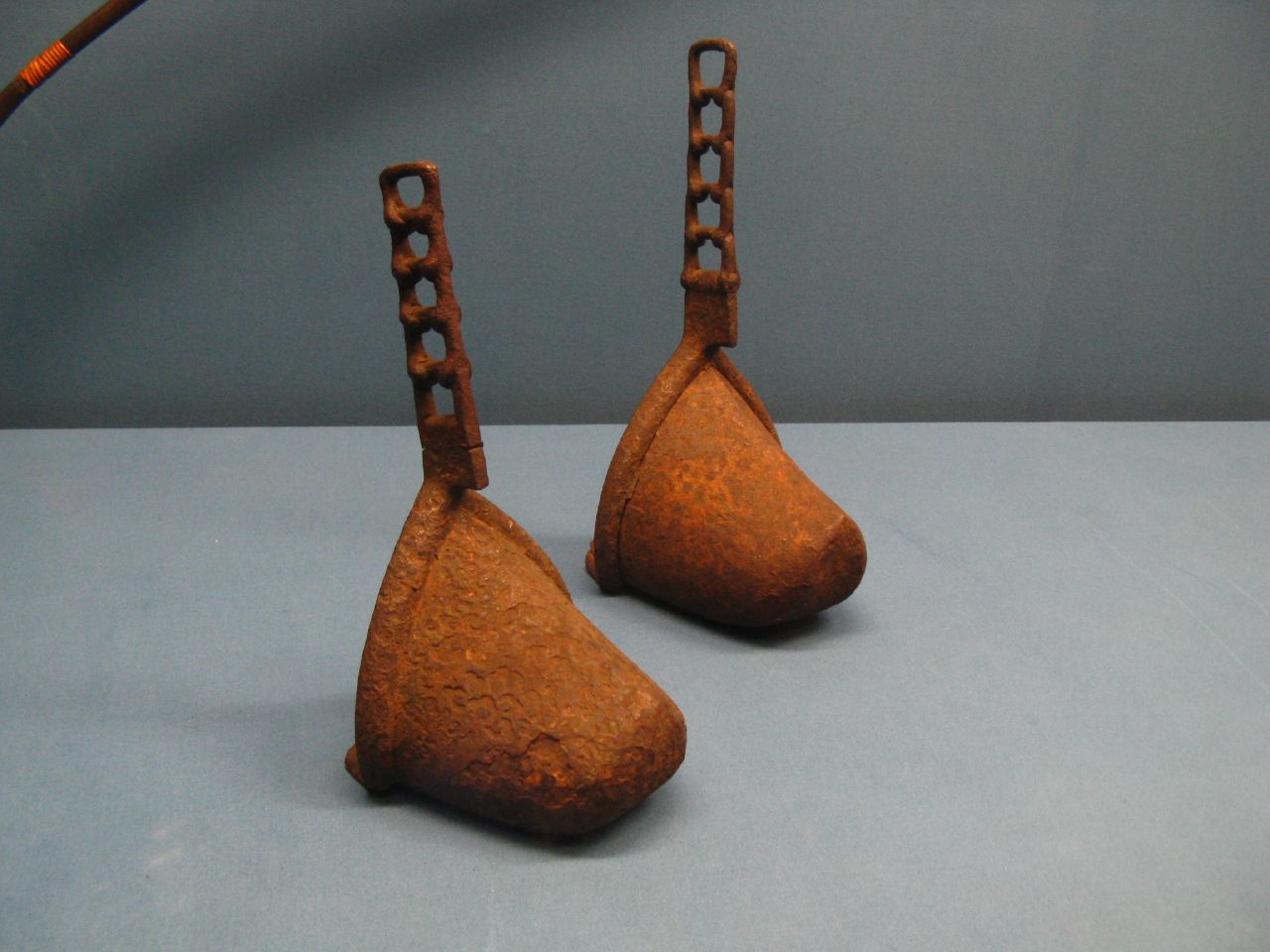
Ancient Japanese stirrups (tsubo abumi), Iron, Kofun period, possibly 5th or 6th century, Tokyo National Museum

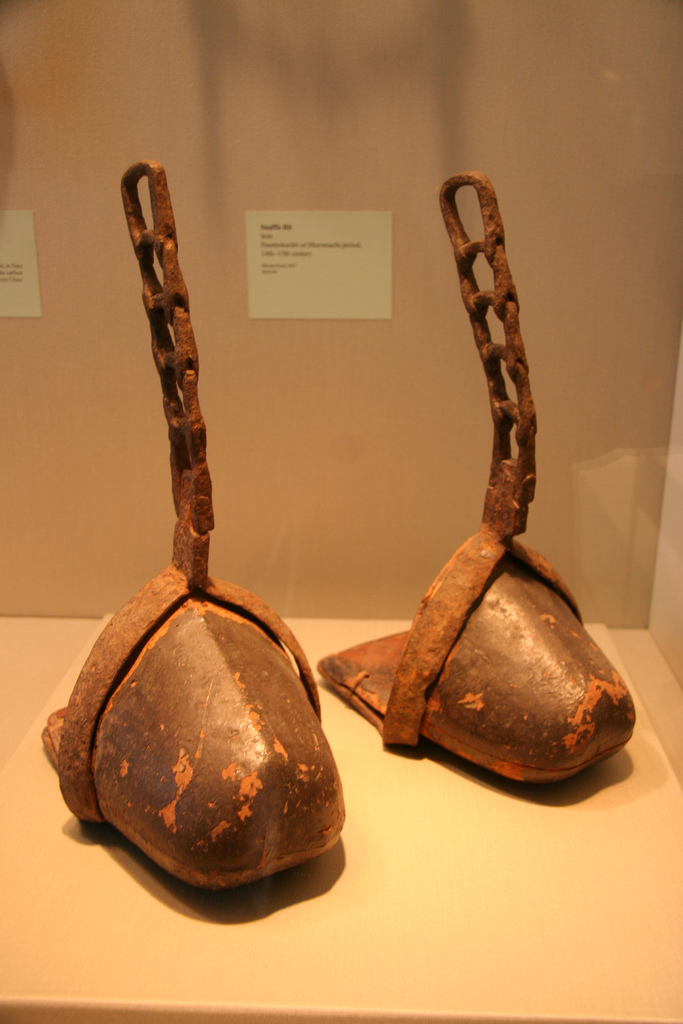
Ancient Japanese stirrups (tsubo abumi), Met museum

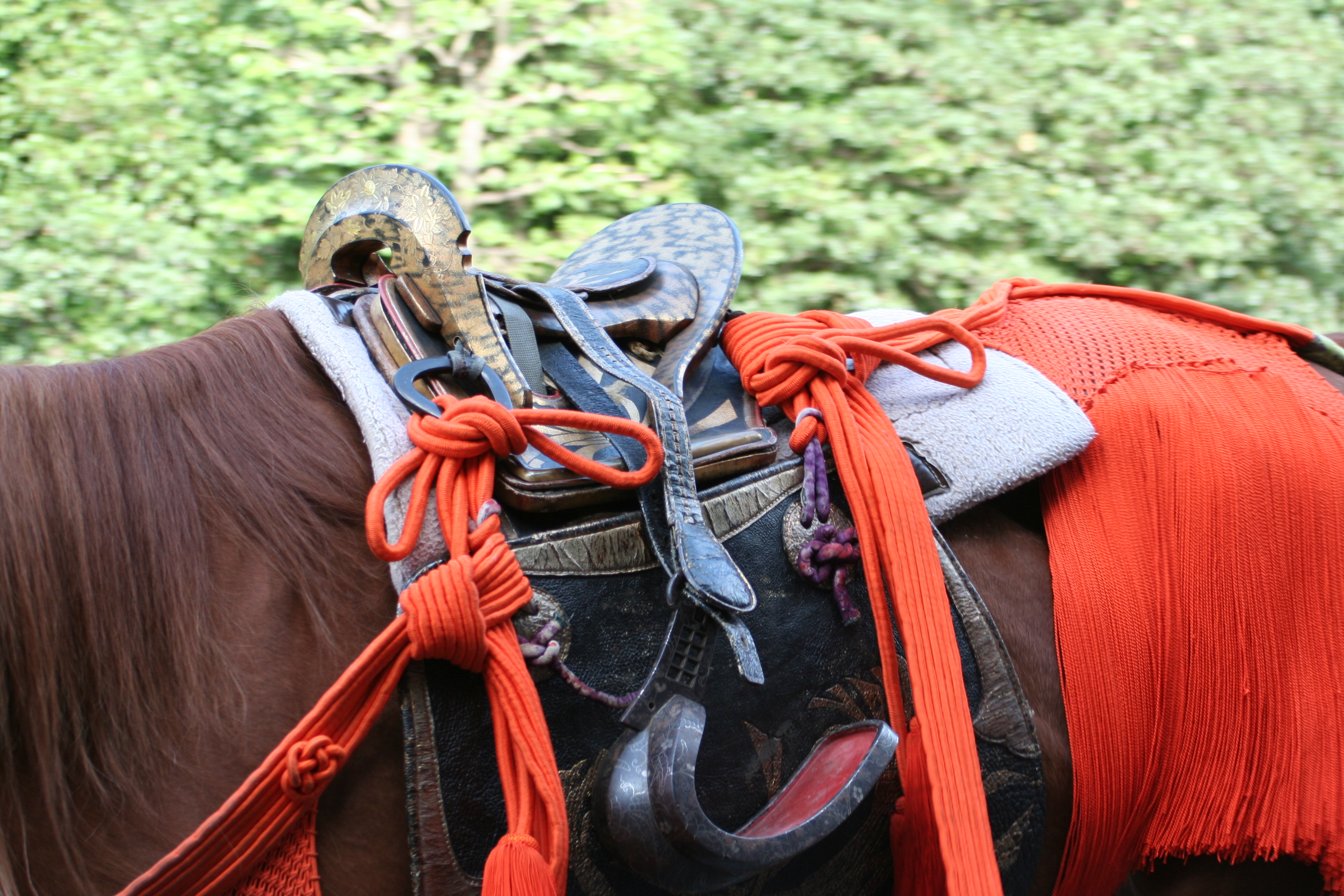
Abumi in use with a Japanese saddle (kura)

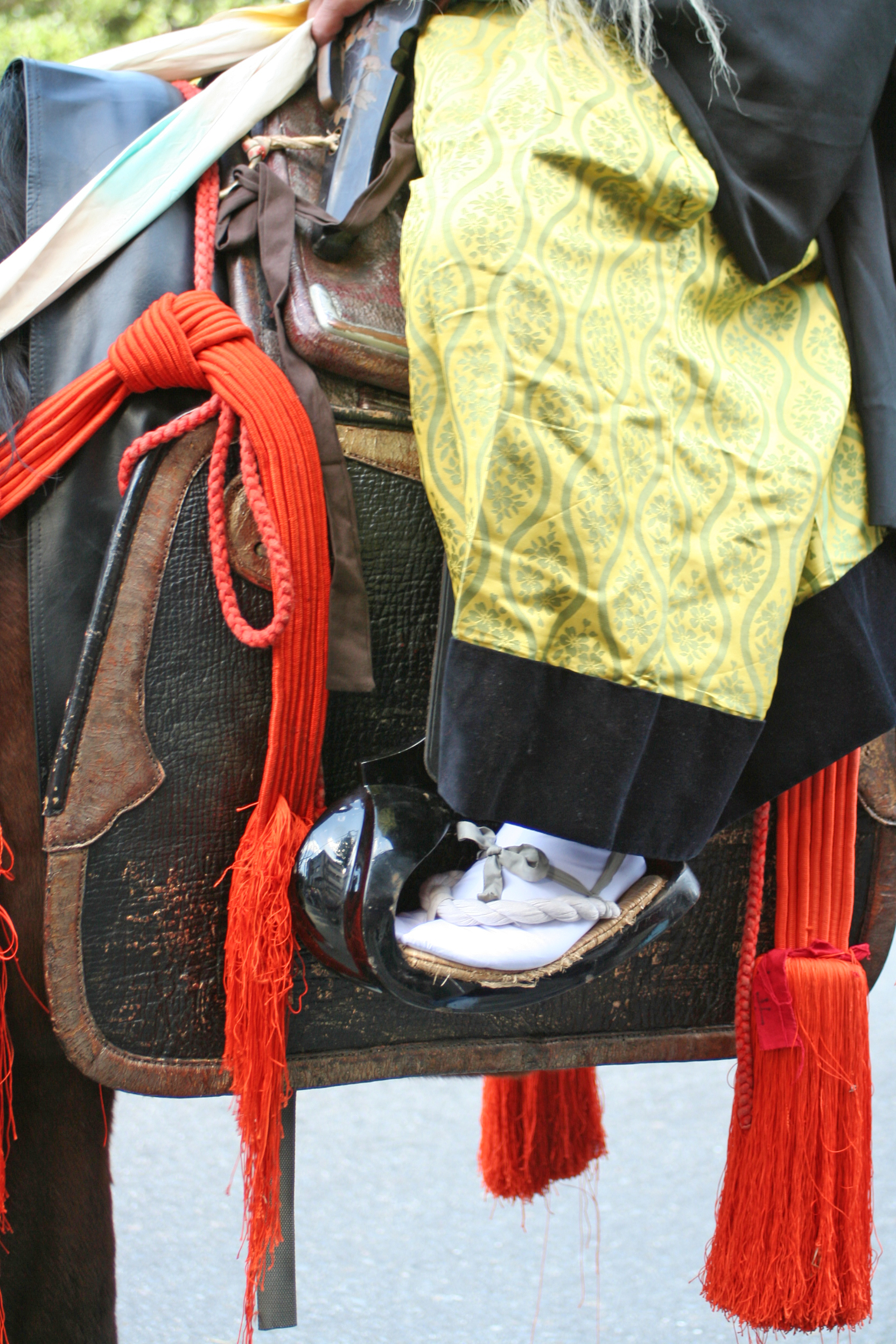

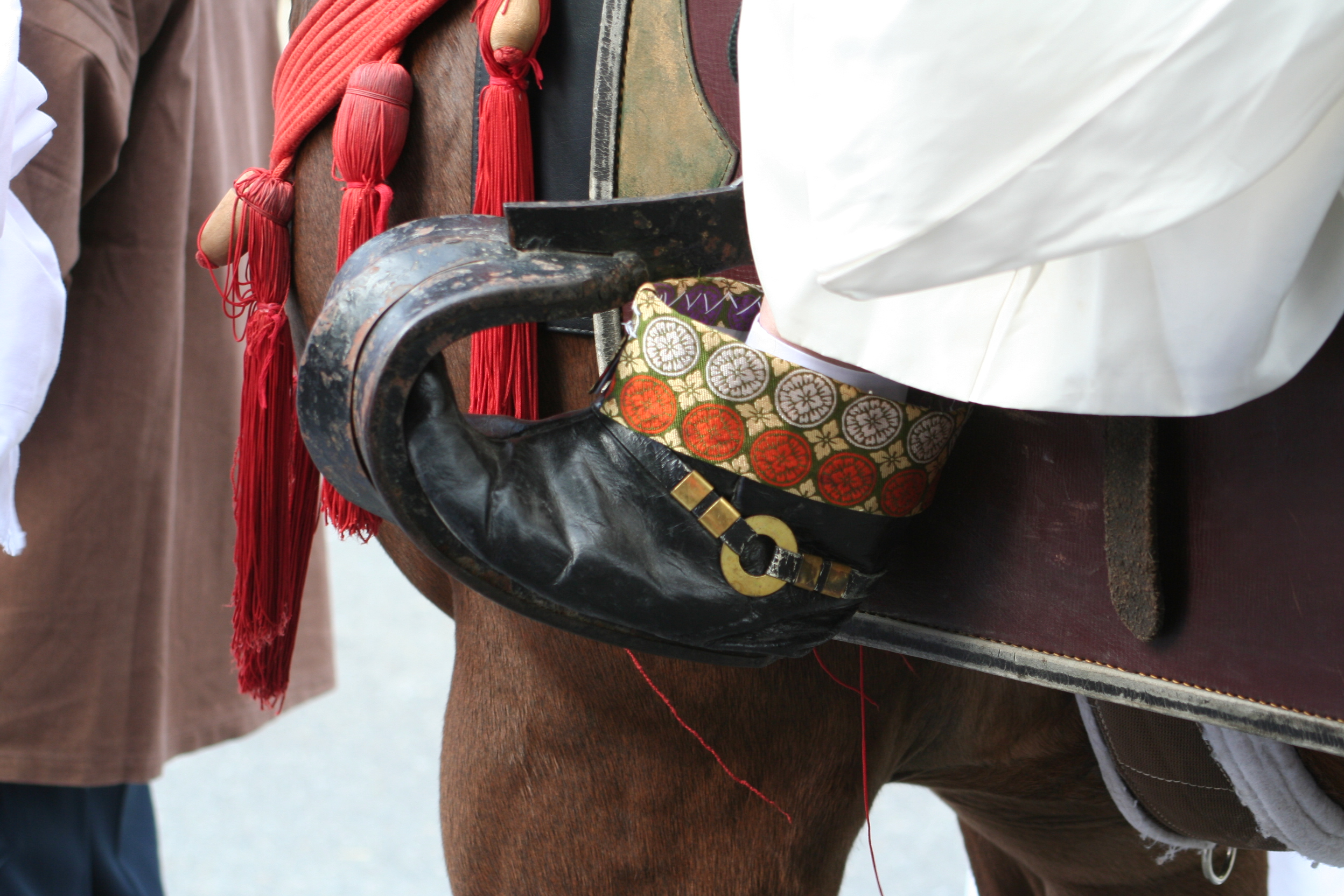

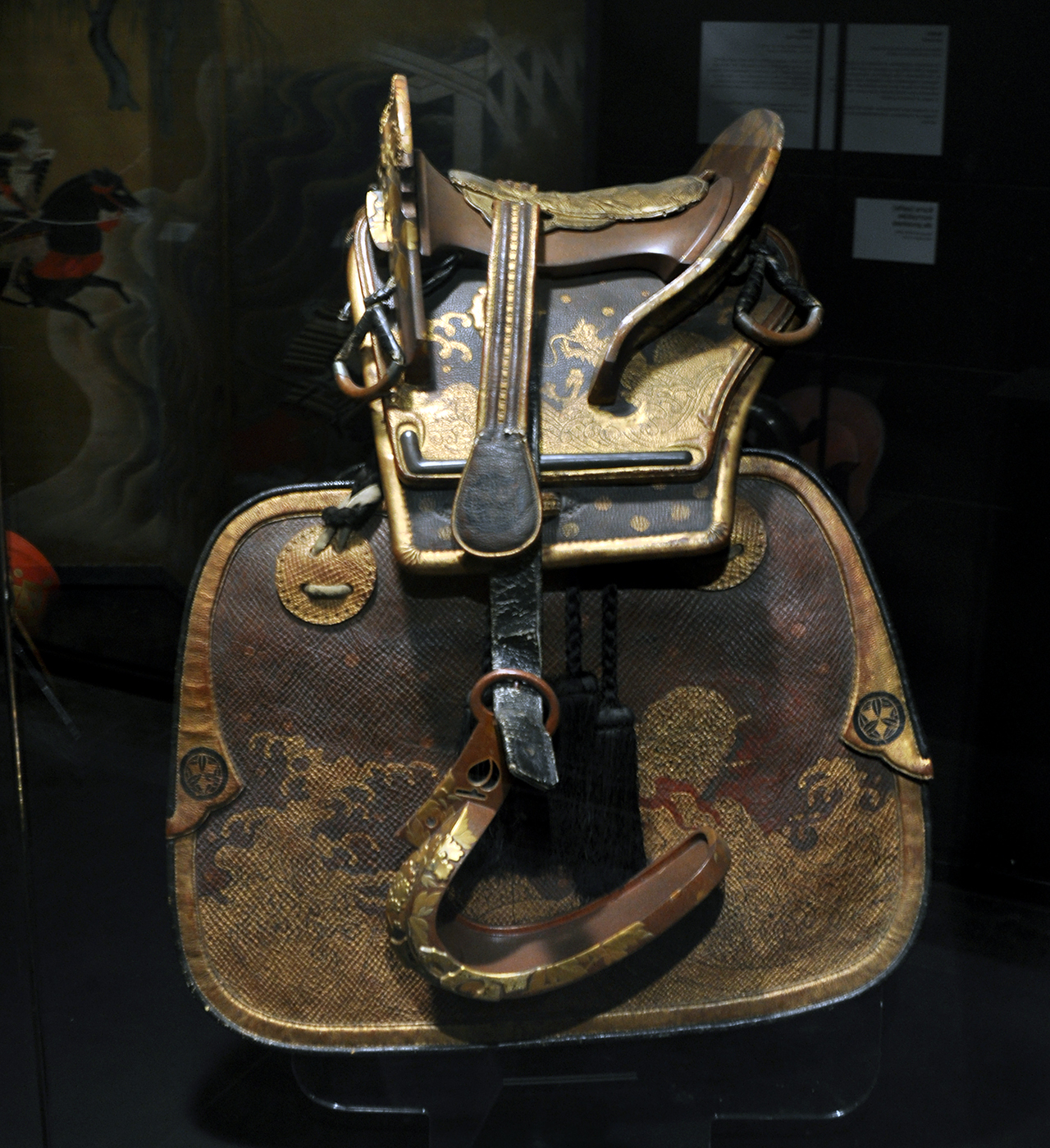
