= Tachibana no Naramaro =

Tachibana no Naramaro (橘奈良麻呂; 721–757) was a Japanese aristocrat (kuge), courtier, and statesman of the Nara period. He was the son of sadaijin Tachibana no Moroe and the second head of the Tachibana clan. He attained the court rank of shō shi-i no ge (正四位下) and the position of sangi, and posthumously of shō ichi-i (正一位) and daijō-daijin.

He was the leader of a plot to replace Fujiwara no Nakamaro and to overthrow Empress Kōken (Tachibana no Naramaro's Conspiracy). It was not successful.

== Early life ==
Naramaro's father Moroe was trusted by Emperor Shōmu to govern, and by 743 was promoted as far as ju ichi-i (従一位) and sadaijin.

In 740, Naramaro was conferred the rank of ju go-i no ge (従五位下) and then promoted to ju go-i no jō (従五位上). In 741 he was promoted to Daigaku-no-kami, in 743 to shō go-i no jō (正五位上), in 745 to director of the Settsu office (摂津大夫), in 746 to Senior Assistant Minister of Popular Affairs (民部大輔), and in 747 to ju shi-i no ge (従四位下).

In 749, Emperor Shōmu retired, and Empress Kōken assumed the throne. Fujiwara no Nakamaro, who had both the favor of Kōken and the confidence of Shōmu's wife Empress Kōmyō, rapidly rose to power, and came into conflict with Moroe. In the same year, Naramaro rose to ju shi-i no jō (従四位上), and was appointed as chamberlain and Sangi.

In 755, Moroe was reported to have slandered the court at a banquet. He resigned in the next year, and died disappointed in 757.

In 756, ex-Emperor Shōmu died, and based on his will Prince Funado was made crown prince. In 757, though, Kōken removed him from the position on the grounds of immorality, and two months later replaced him with Nakamaro's preferred candidate Prince Ōi, the future Emperor Junnin.

== Conspiracy and capture ==
Another month later, Naramaro was made sadaiben (左大弁) within the Daijō-kan. Naramaro was extremely unhappy with Nakamaro's monopolization of power, and together with a group including Ōtomo no Komaro and Ono no Azumabito, plotted to remove Nakamaro. Naramaro held meetings and secretly tried to recruit sympathizers, but the plot was leaked. Fujiwara no Otosada informed Nakamaro that Naramaro and company were preparing weapons.

On July 26, 757, Kamitsumichi no Hitatsu revealed that Ono no Azumabito had approached him to request his participation in Naramaro's plot, and Azumabito was arrested and interrogated. Tortured by caning, Azumabito confessed everything. The plan had been for Naramaro to raise troops and kill Nakamaro, then make the crown prince resign. Stealing the emperor's seal and station bells, they would leave Fujiwara no Toyonari in power over the country, make the Emperor resign, and choose a more sympathetic prince as the new emperor. The candidates for this were Prince Funado, Prince Kibumi, Prince Asukabe, and Prince Shioyaki.

Those named by Azumabito, including Naramaro, Funado, Prince Kibumi, Tajihi no Kōshikai (多治比犢養), and Kamo no Tsunotari (賀茂角足), were simultaneously arrested early the next year. Interrogated by Fujiwara no Nagate, Naramaro said that because the government was wicked, he planned to raise troops and make a petition. When Nagate asked why the government was wicked, Naramaro responded that the government was constructing temples like Tōdai-ji while the people suffered. Nagate replied that Tōdai-ji was constructed in the time of Naramaro's own father, and Naramaro had no answer to that. According to Saeki no Matanari's confession, Naramaro first began to plot a rebellion when Emperor Shōmu made an imperial visit to Namba in 745, and invited Matanari to participate at that time. After his interrogation, Matanari committed suicide.

== Aftermath ==
Although the punishment for the conspirators would normally have been death, Empress Kōken decreed that they should be spared this highest punishment and exiled instead. However, Nakamaro wanted to establish the firm rule of law, and did not relent. The next day, those implicated in the conspiracy, including Prince Funado, Prince Kibumi, Komaro, and Kōshikai, were relentlessly beaten with canes all over their bodies, under the supervision of a group including Nagate, Kudara no Konikishi, and Prince Fune. Azumabito, who had already confessed, was treated the same. After hours of this torture, the victims died in prison. Naramaro's fate is not recorded in the Shoku Nihongi, but he is assumed to have died in the same way. The record may have been erased when Naramaro's granddaughter Tachibana no Kachiko became the empress consort (皇后) of Emperor Saga. However, Naramaro's name continues to appear in the Shoku Nihongi after the conspiracy's exposure, so this theory is also problematic.

Ironically, after Naramaro's death, his son Kiyotomo was born, and Kiyotomo's daughter Kachiko bore Emperor Saga the future Emperor Ninmyō. Meanwhile, Naramaro's opponent Nakamaro himself rebelled and was defeated. In 847, Naramaro was posthumously granted the ranks his old enemy had been stripped of: shō ichi-i (正一位) and daijō-daijin.

== Genealogy ==
- Father: Tachibana no Moroe
- Mother: Fujiwara no Tabino (藤原多比能), daughter of Fujiwara no Fuhito
- Wife: from the Ōhara family?
  - Eldest son: Tachibana no Yasumaro (橘安麻呂; 739–821)
- Wife: daughter of Ōtomo no Koshibi
  - Son: Tachibana no Shimadamaro (橘島田麻呂; 750–?)
- Wife: daughter of Fujiwara no Umakai?
  - Son: Tachibana no Irii (橘入居; ?–800)
- Wife: daughter of Awata no Hitokami (粟田人上)
  - Son: Tachibana no Kiyotomo (橘清友; 758–789)
- Unknown wife:
  - Son: Tachibana no Kiyono (橘清野; 750–830)
