= Empress Kōken =

Empress of Japan (749–758; 764–770)

Empress Kōken / Empress Shōtoku 孝謙天皇 / 称徳天皇
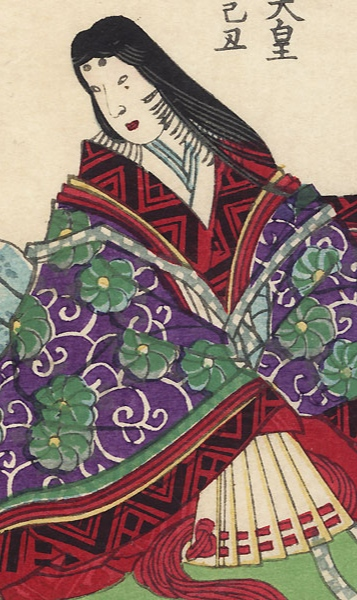
- 1878 depiction of Empress Kōken by Utagawa Kunisada III

Empress of Japan (Kōken, first reign)
- Reign: 749–758
- Enthronement: 749
- Predecessor: Shōmu
- Successor: Junnin

(Shōtoku, second reign)
- Reign: 764 – 770
- Enthronement: 765
- Predecessor: Junnin
- Successor: Kōnin
- Born: Abe (阿倍); 718; Heijō-kyō, Japan
- Died: 770 (aged 51–52); Heijō-kyō, Japan
- Burial: Saki Takatsuka Kofun
Posthumous name
- Empress Kōken (孝謙天皇); Empress Shōtoku (称徳天皇)
- House: Imperial House of Japan
- Father: Emperor Shōmu
- Mother: Empress Kōmyō

Empress Kōken (born Abe, known as Empress Shōtoku during her second reign; 718–770) was the 46th and 48th monarch of Japan according to the traditional order of succession. Seeking to protect the bloodline of Prince Kusakabe, her father, Emperor Shōmu, named her as his heir in 738, and she succeeded her father as empress regnant in 749 after he retired to become a Buddhist monk. With the backing of her mother, Empress Kōmyō, and cousin Fujiwara no Nakamaro, she was able to outmaneuver a largely hostile Daijō-kan (Council of State). Her father died in 756, having named a cousin unrelated to the Fujiwara clan as Kōken's heir; this outraged her maternal Fujiwara relatives and their supporters, and Kōken replaced him with Prince Ōi, a close ally of her mother and Nakamaro. In 757, she headed off a conspiracy to overthrow her by Tachibana no Naramaro, and resigned the following year to serve as empress emerita (Daijō Tennō), while Ōi reigned as Emperor Junnin.

Nakamaro slowly consolidated his political power with the backing of Empress Kōmyō. After an illness, Kōken became close to a healer-monk named Dōkyō, who became one of her strongest allies, as well as potentially an intimate partner. After this, she became a bhikkhunī (Buddhist nun) and shaved her head. After her mother's death in 760, Kōken began to oppose Nakamaro. She proclaimed superiority over Emperor Junnin in state matters in 762, and allied with anti-Nakamaro leaders, including her childhood tutor Kibi no Makibi. In 764, political conflict grew violent after she attempted to take control of the imperial seals; Nakamaro fought a brief rebellion against her, naming Prince Shioyaki as emperor, but both were captured and executed, and Kōken returned to the throne as Empress Shōtoku.

Shōtoku's second reign was marked by the promotion of Buddhist ideals and religious institutions, as well as the advancement of Dōkyō (who was promoted to the rank of Hō-ō, 'Prince of the Law' or 'Buddhist King') to oversee religious matters. She oversaw land reform which placed limits on land ownership for all except Buddhist temples—alienating aristocrats and courtisans, and ordered the foundation of a new capital. As part of her religious reforms, she placed monastic officials on the Council of State for the first time, and ordered the construction of one million miniature pagodas housing printed prayers; these were distributed to major temples around Nara. In 769, she was the subject of an incident where an oracle of the Usa Shrine stated that the deity Hachiman sought for Dōkyō to become emperor. This was disputed by an emissary named Wake no Kiyomaro, and Dōkyō lost his political standing following her death several months later.

== Early life and background ==
Princess Abe was born in 718 to Obito, the heir to the Japanese throne, and his consort Fujiwara Asukabehime. Obito, the son of Emperor Monmu and grandson of the powerful statesman Fujiwara no Fuhito, had been considered as a candidate for emperor in his youth after his father's death in 707. Instead, Monmu's mother Gemmei was selected; this was somewhat supported by Obito's proponents, as Gemmei wished for Obito to be her successor. Obito was named heir in 713, but did not succeed his grandmother when she resigned in 715. Instead, the throne first passed to Obito's aunt Genshō, who passed the throne to Obito in 724. Obito then reigned as Emperor Shōmu.

Emperor Shōmu and Asukabehime had a son, Motoi, in 727. To the frustration of some court members, the Emperor designated Motoi his heir soon after his birth, following the succession law promulgated in the Taihō Code. However, Motoi died before the age of two, leaving the future succession unclear. Shōmu had another son, Prince Asaka (born to a mother from the Agata-Inukai family) whose potential succession greatly worried the Fujiwara clan and its supporters. Following the alleged coup attempt and resulting suicide of the potential throne claimant Prince Nagaya in 729, Shōmu appointed Asukabehime as empress. Taking the title Empress Kōmyō, this appointment qualified her to become empress regent upon Shōmu's death, and privileged her descendants (including Abe) for future succession.

=== Heir apparent ===
The 735–737 Japanese smallpox epidemic devastated western Yamato, killing all four of Empress Kōmyō's brothers. Although the court was reorganized in the aftermath of the epidemic (with significantly less Fujiwara influence), Shōmu declared his twenty-one-year-old daughter Abe his heir in 738. A woman had never been declared as heir to the throne; prior empresses, such as Genmei and Genshō, had only reigned temporarily during the minority of male heirs. Non-Fujiwara members of the court opposed Abe's heirship in favor of Asaka, but Shōmu resisted, seeing Asaka's Agata no Inukai mother's clan as less useful allies than those of Abe's Fujiwara mother. Asaka died in 744 at age 16, leaving Abe as the only plausible heir.

Writing in a later edict, Abe recounted how her "mother revealed that the royal stem line [of Prince Kusakabe] would end. To prevent that, it was necessary that I succeed, even though a woman."

Abe was educated by the scholar Kibi no Makibi, who had studied in China and taught her to read the Chinese classics such as the Book of Rites and the Book of Han. Likely at Kibi's suggestion, she performed the Gosechi no mai (五節舞) dance for Emperor Shōmu and Empress Emerita (太上天皇, Daijō Tennō) Genshō in a filial ceremony in the early spring of 743. Abe never married or had children; this may have been to preserve the bloodline of Prince Kusakabe, as any of her children would be considered part of her consort's family and not a direct descendant of Kusakabe.

Genshō died in 748, leaving the office of Daijō Tennō vacant. Shōmu, purportedly in ill health and unable to fulfill his duties as emperor, issued an edict in 749, declaring, "Reflecting upon the fact that only sons carry on the father's name, should daughters go unrewarded? It is fitting that both serve together." On the second day of the seventh month of 749, Shōmu resigned to become a Buddhist monk, and Abe took the throne as Empress Kōken. Shōmu's resignation speech appealed to concepts of sacred kingship and patrilineal succession, followed since the reign of Emperor Tenji, as well as to female deities and past female rulers.

== First reign ==
At the beginning of her reign, Empress Kōken faced considerable political opposition from the Great Council of State (太政官, Daijō-kan). Only three members of the fifteen-member council were members of the Fujiwara clan. She chose a four-character era name, Tenpyō-shōhō (天平勝宝), upon her ascension to the throne, possibly modelled after the unique four-character era names introduced by the influential Chinese empress regnant Wu Zetian.

As her lack of an heir proved a consistent source of political tension with the Grand Council of State, Kōken sought to rule by decree and bypass the council. Her mother, Empress Kōmyō, transformed the Kogogushiki ('Empress-consort's Household Agency') into a larger agency dubbed the Shibichudai (紫微中台). Taking on a dual role as both a secretariat and a managing agency for the imperial household, the agency expanded to include around a thousand officials and performed duties similar to those of the Council of State. Kōmyō appointed her nephew, Fujiwara no Nakamaro (the grandson of Fujiwara no Fuhito and a member of the Great Council of State), to head the agency. He used it to transmit and enforce Kōken's edicts. This agency granted tremendous power to both Kōmyō and Nakamaro, the latter of whom steadily gained influence over the course of Kōken's reign, becoming the dominant political figure in Kōken's court and representing a resurgence of Fujiwara power. Nakamaro suppressed the influence of Kōken's opponents, including his main political rival, Tachibana no Moroe—the nominal head of government, formerly supported by Empress Genshō.

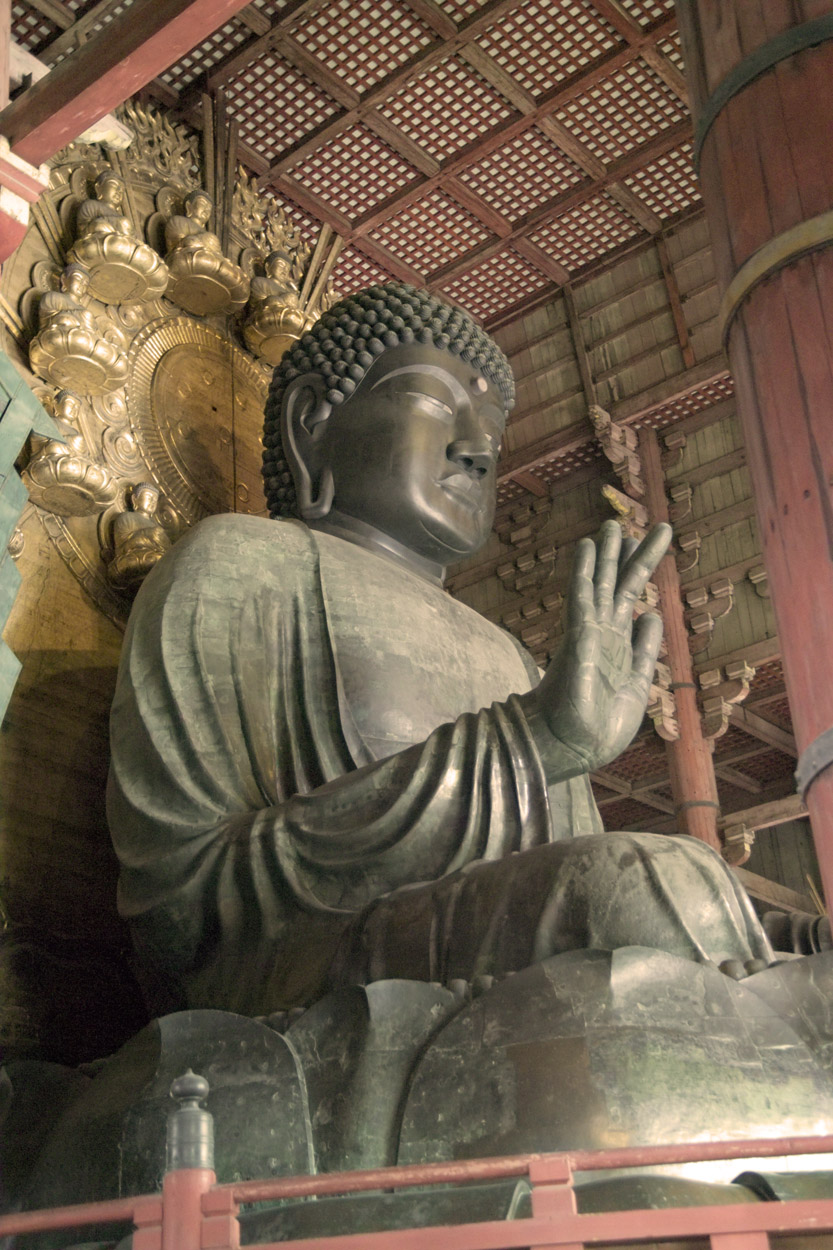
The Nara Great Buddha at Tōdai-ji

Kōken and Nakamaro also used the Tōdai-ji Construction Agency (Zōtōdaijishi), established by Shōmu to oversee the creation of the Nara Great Buddha, as a means to support their rule. The Great Buddha was completed in 752 and inaugurated in a grand ceremony in the fourth month; the monk Bodhisena painted the statue's eyes before the Empress, her parents, and a great number of monks. They installed a plaque declaring the temple the "Realm-protecting temple of the golden light and the four heavenly kings", the chief temple of the emerging state temple system. That year, monastic governors were dispatched to each province to supplement the secular Ritsuryō kokushi (国司) and manage the temple in each.

Emperor Shōmu died in the fifth month of 756, and his will assigned a cousin, Prince Funado (one of Emperor Tenmu's grandsons), to become Kōken's heir. Funado was not related to the Fujiwara, outraging their supporters, while the declaration of an heir by someone other than the sovereign themselves was seen as highly unusual. Several days later, Fujiwara officials retaliated by arresting two prominent opponent officials accused of disrespecting the Empress. Kōken disavowed Funado as heir in an edict issued in the fourth month of 757, accusing him of failing to observe the mourning period for Shōmu. This edict also ordered copies of the Confucian Classic of Filial Piety to be distributed to local chieftains, likely echoing Emperor Xuanzong of Tang, who, fourteen years earlier, had ordered his commentary on the classic to be distributed. Later that year, Kōken appointed Nakamaro's son-in-law, Prince Ōi, another of Tenmu's grandsons and a close ally of both Nakamaro and Kōmyō, as heir to the throne. He would eventually reign as Emperor Junnin.

=== Naramaro conspiracy and resignation ===
According to the Shoku Nihongi (続日本紀) (one of the Rikkokushi "Six National Histories"), Tachibana no Naramaro, the son of Moroe, attempted to organize a coup d'état against Kōken, Kōmyō, and Nakamaro in the seventh month of 757, heading a conspiracy involving over four hundred officials and four princes. They allegedly sought to kill Nakamaro and to overthrow the Empress, installing one of their own as emperor. Upon learning of Naramaro's plans, Kōken and Kōmyō ordered imperial guard units to crack down on the plotters. The punishment inflicted on the plotters varied: some of them were executed, including Funado (whose name was officially changed to Matohi, 'foolish', before his death). Some princes were reduced to the status of commoners before their executions. Some plotters were exiled or imprisoned until later amnesties released them, while others were pardoned immediately. The fate of Naramaro himself is unknown, but his family avoided the extermination prescribed for the families of those convicted of high treason.

In the eighth month of the same year, a commoner from Suruga Province is said to have presented the imperial court with a cocoon on which sixteen characters had been woven by a silkworm. This miraculous sign prompted the issuance of an edict five days later, proclaiming the beginning of a new era, Tenpyō-hōji (天平宝字). Later in 757, the government promulgated the Yōrō Code, a legal code first begun by Fujiwara no Fuhito prior to 720. The following year, Nakamaro founded frontier outposts in the remote northern provinces of Mutsu and Dewa and ordered the construction of a fleet of 500 ships for a planned invasion of the Korean kingdom of Silla.

Later in 758, Kōken took control of the Imperial Guards from Nakamaro, but was pressured to resign in order to pass the throne to Ōi, who took the throne as Emperor Junnin. Kōken, now Empress Emerita (太上天皇, Daijō Tennō), also became known by the name Kōya.

== Interregnum ==
Unusually for a new emperor, Junnin's accession to the throne was not accompanied by a new era name. At the outset of his reign, he presided over the imperial court alongside Kōken and Kōmyō. Nakamaro's power grew under Junnin's reign; he became the leader of the Council of State, seeing an appointment both as the Minister of the Right and as the Taiho, 'Grand Protector'. Junnin was largely under Kōmyō and Nakamaro's political influence; soon after taking office, Junnin granted Nakamaro land and a new name, Emi no Oshikatsu.

In mid-760, the death of Kōmyō—Nakamaro's most influential supporter—threatened the balance of political power. After the death of her mother, Kōken began to assert herself politically against Nakamaro. Around 761, (Note: Sources variously describe Kōken's illness and healing by Dōkyō as occurring in 760, 761, or 762.) she fell ill and was cared for at a temporary palace near Lake Biwa by a Buddhist monk and healer named Dōkyō. He was among the most educated group of the Nara monks, well-versed in Sanskrit, meditation, and esoteric sutras. Dōkyō's religious practices appeared to cure her illnesses, and she returned to Nara in the fifth month of 762, where she took up residence at a Buddhist temple. She became initiated as a bhikkhunī (Buddhist nun), shaved her head, and began to wear robes. Kōken and Dōkyō entered an intimate relationship, but to what extent is unknown; the Nihon Ryōiki (an early ninth-century collection of stories) states that they "shared the same pillow", while the Shoku Nihongi merely states that he gained her favor or affection.

Kōken expanded her political power after her return to Nara, despite her monastic initiation. In the sixth month of 762, she issued an edict reproaching Junnin as disloyal and failing to uphold filial piety. She transferred much of the emperor's power to herself, stating:

"For government, the sitting monarch will handle small matters. Matters of importance—punishments and rewards—will be mine to command."

— edict of Kōken, sixth month of 762

Although she was emulating the authority previously held by her mother Kōmyō, the edict granted her powers unprecedented for a Daijō Tennō. She may have been inspired by Ruizong of Tang, who had passed the throne to his heir Xuanzong, while reserving power over the most important matters for himself. This greatly threatened Nakamaro, who consolidated his power; by the end of the year, three of his four sons had been appointed to the Council of State. Kōken held power over the imperial palace, while Nakamaro held power over the Council of State and its ministries, resulting in significant political upheaval.

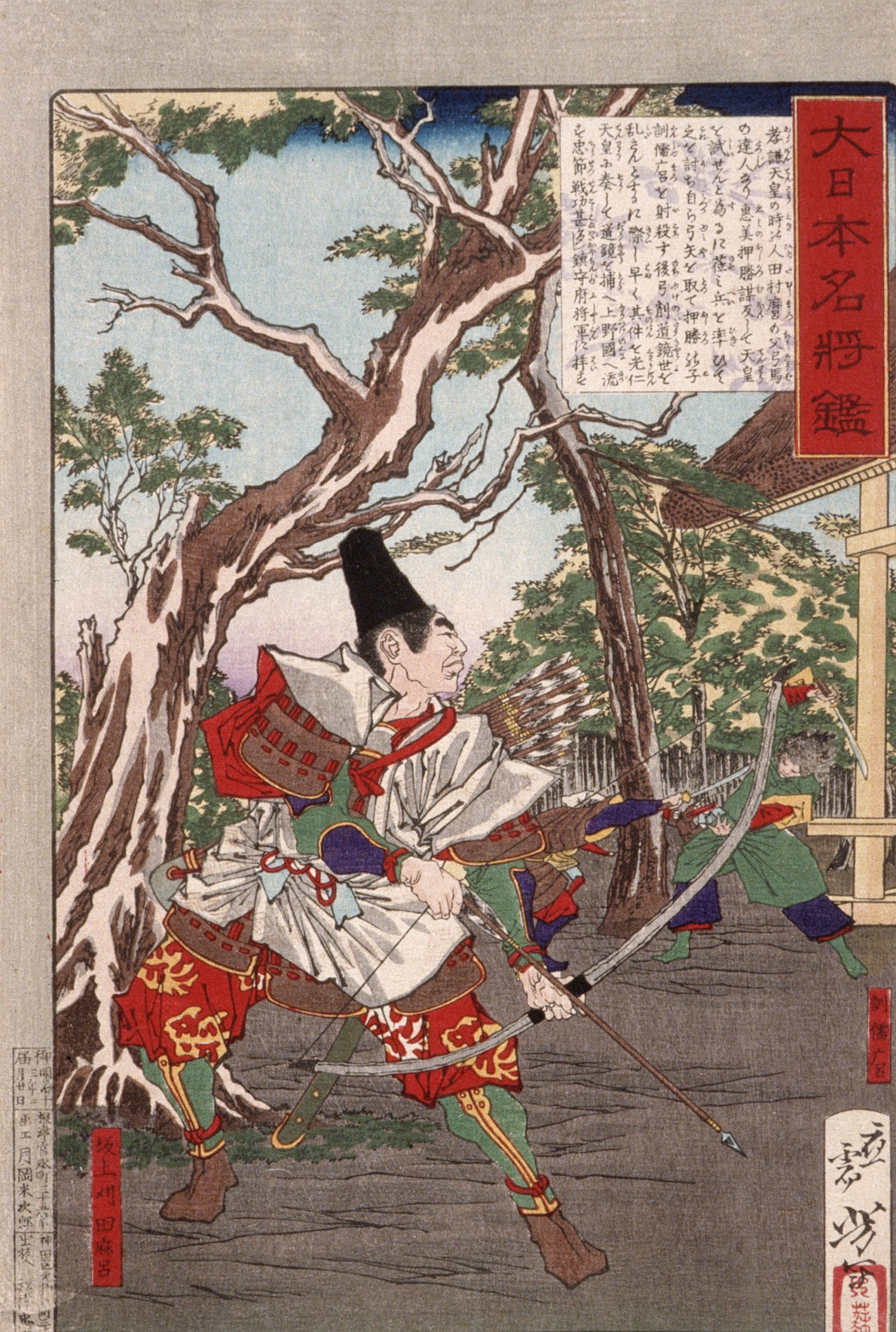
1880s depiction of the warrior Sakanoue no Karitamaro during the Fujiwara no Nakamaro Rebellion

Political figures opposed to Nakamaro began to gravitate towards Kōken and make their own appointments, including Kōken's childhood tutor Kibi no Makibi, who was brought out of exile to manage construction at Tōdai-ji. Two new guard units were created to protect the palace. In 763, Kōken removed the Shōsozu (the third rank in the monastic hierarchy) Jikun, a monastic ally of Nakamaro, from the Sōgōsho ('Prelates Office'). She replaced him with Dōkyō, promoting him past several inferior ranks. To bypass Nakamaro's control of the Council of State, she created her own secretariat dubbed the Naishisho.

=== Nakamaro's rebellion ===
On New Years, 764, Emperor Junnin appointed two of Nakamaro's sons to be the governors of Echizen and Mino, wealthy neighboring provinces to his powerbase of Ōmi. Nakamaro appointed himself the commander of military units near the capital, dispatched soldiers to regions under his control, and increased the size of provincial militias. Aware that Nakamaro was planning a coup d'état, Kōken dispatched an emissary to take control of state seals (used for promulgating state documents) and station bells from Nakamaro's palace. The emissary was killed, and Nakamaro and his forces were forced to flee Nara in the ensuing violence, taking with him the seals and bells.

Nakamaro fled to Ōmi province. After Junnin refused to join the rebellion, Nakamaro declared the prince Shioyaki (the older brother of Funado) emperor under the name Kinkō. In Ōmi, he was opposed by Kibi no Makibi, who organized provincial forces against the rebellion and seized control of crucial ports around Lake Biwa. Kibi also created a cavalry force composed of palace guardsmen and established a special guard unit to protect Kōken. Nakamaro faced serious opposition from other members of his clan outside of his own Southern House, and especially from the descendants of Fujiwara no Umakai. State agents refused to honor Nakamaro and Shioyaki's edicts, and both were surrounded and killed by imperial forces in Echizen.

Kōken consolidated her political power in the aftermath of the rebellion. Although Junnin had refused to join the rebellion, he was accused of complicity, and he was captured and deposed by imperial troops about a month after Nakamaro's death. Junnin was exiled to the island of Awaji, while Kōken reascended to the throne under a new name, Empress Shōtoku. (Note: She took the regnal name Shōtoku 称徳, not to be confused with Prince Shōtoku, whose name is spelled with different kanji (聖徳).)

== Second reign ==
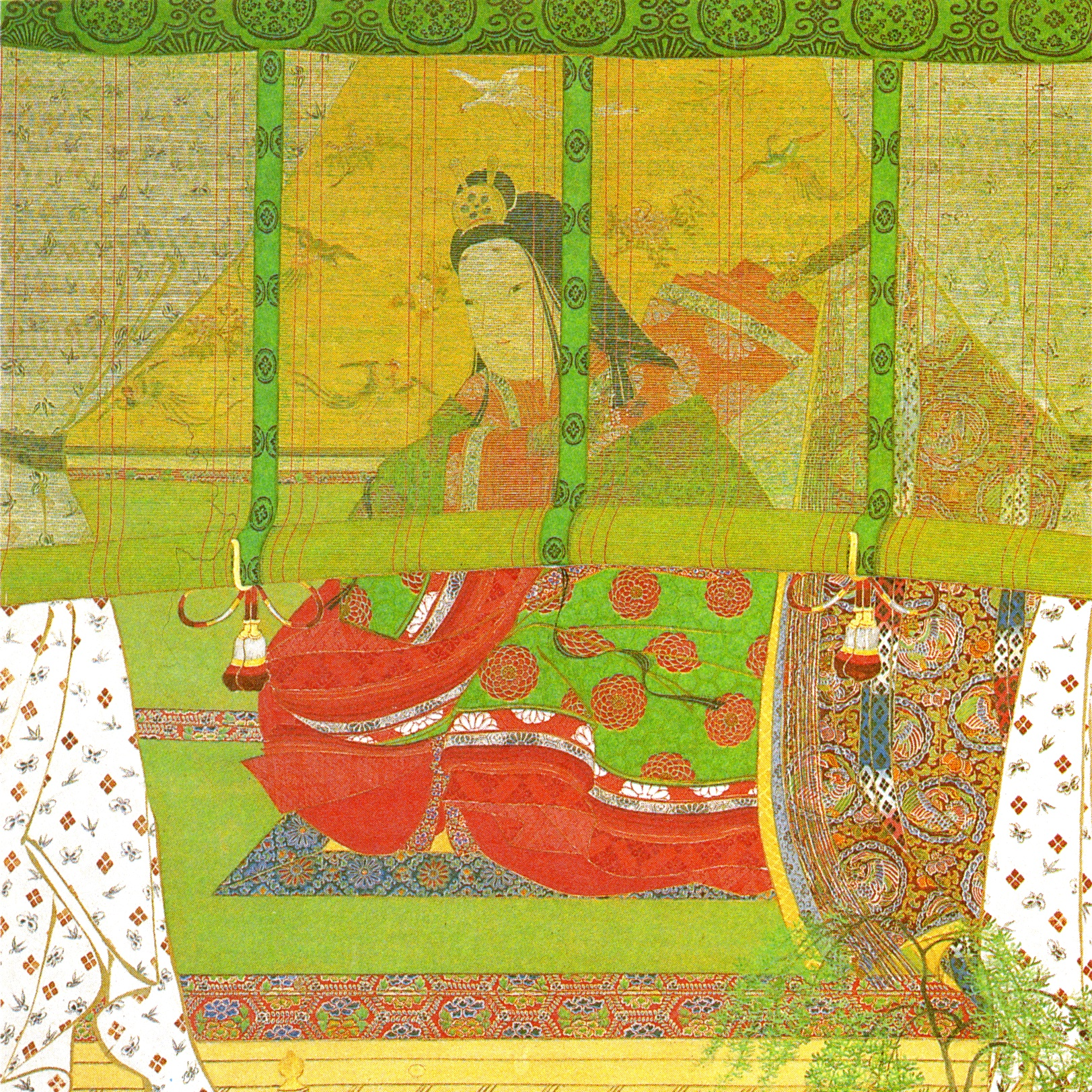
An 18th century depiction of Shōtoku

After reassuming the throne, Shōtoku issued an edict proclaiming herself a bodhisattva and stating that her father, Emperor Shōmu, had given her the authority to depose her successors and ensure the obedience of the princes and ministers. She recalled Nakamaro's brother Fujiwara no Toyonari (who had been exiled for opposing him) back to Nara, reappointing him as Minister of the Right and leader of the Council of State. She promoted Dōkyō to the third court rank and gave him a seat on the Council of State, granting him the title of daijō-daijin zenshi ('Healer-monk and Grand Minister', a version of the rarely-held highest bureaucratic rank daijō-daijin), stating that an ordained ruler should be served by an ordained minister. She also expanded the size of the council, seating supporters such as Kibi no Makibi, members of different Fujiwara branches, members of rival houses, provincial leaders, and several imperial princes. The appointment of rival aristocrats was intended to balance the aristocrats against one another, but resulted in an inefficient bureaucracy and unrest on the council. However, her appointment policies did result in significantly more provincial representation within the capital, allowing for greater centralization.

Among Shōtoku's first acts upon reassuming the throne was to reverse Nakamaro's name changes to political posts, changing them back to Japanese from their Chinese equivalents. She expanded the imperial guard, which she placed under the command of Fujiwara no Kurajimaro, who had become her chief military commander. She organized a number of reforms favoring Buddhist temples; she restricted the amount of land aristocrats and non-Buddhist institutions could privately own, and established separate lines of command for secular and Buddhist affairs. These were organized under distinct and parallel hierarchies of ministers and advisors. She also instituted policies aimed at promoting economic stability; she granted amnesties from tribute for provinces experiencing poor harvests and famine conditions, confiscated and distributed rice paddies from aristocrats to resolve shortages of public farmland, and established systems for farmers to raise complaints against local governors. These reforms angered both courtiers and the provincial nobility, as land rents had become a major source of income for much of the aristocracy.

Shōtoku never appointed an heir during her second reign, publishing an edict in late 764 stating that she would take some time to select an heir, and would not follow the will of her courtiers in this matter.

"Those who serve me—whether of high, middle, or low rank—often say, 'To stabilize the realm, decide upon a crown prince and everyone will be tranquil and harmonious.' However, I have not appointed anyone as yet because the one who people call worthy is not always so. If someone that Heaven will not accept is named, he will not succeed and will be destroyed. As I reflect on it, this office is not something to be decided by a human. Neither is it attainable by violence or coercion. I alone am Heaven's heir, and I will decide about a successor."

— edict of Empress Shōtoku, fourteenth day of the tenth month, 764

The political influence of the Fujiwara steadily grew during Shōtoku's second reign; by 769, they held six out of the seventeen seats on the Council of State, alongside the Ministry of the Treasury and the Ministry of Popular Affairs. They were countered by a group of Shōtoku's closest allies, such as Kibi no Makibi and Yuge Kiyobito (the brother of Dōkyō), which held positions in the imperial palace. Shōtoku ordered the construction of a new capital at Yuge in Kawachi Province, and in 769 conscripted thousands of workers to help build the city.

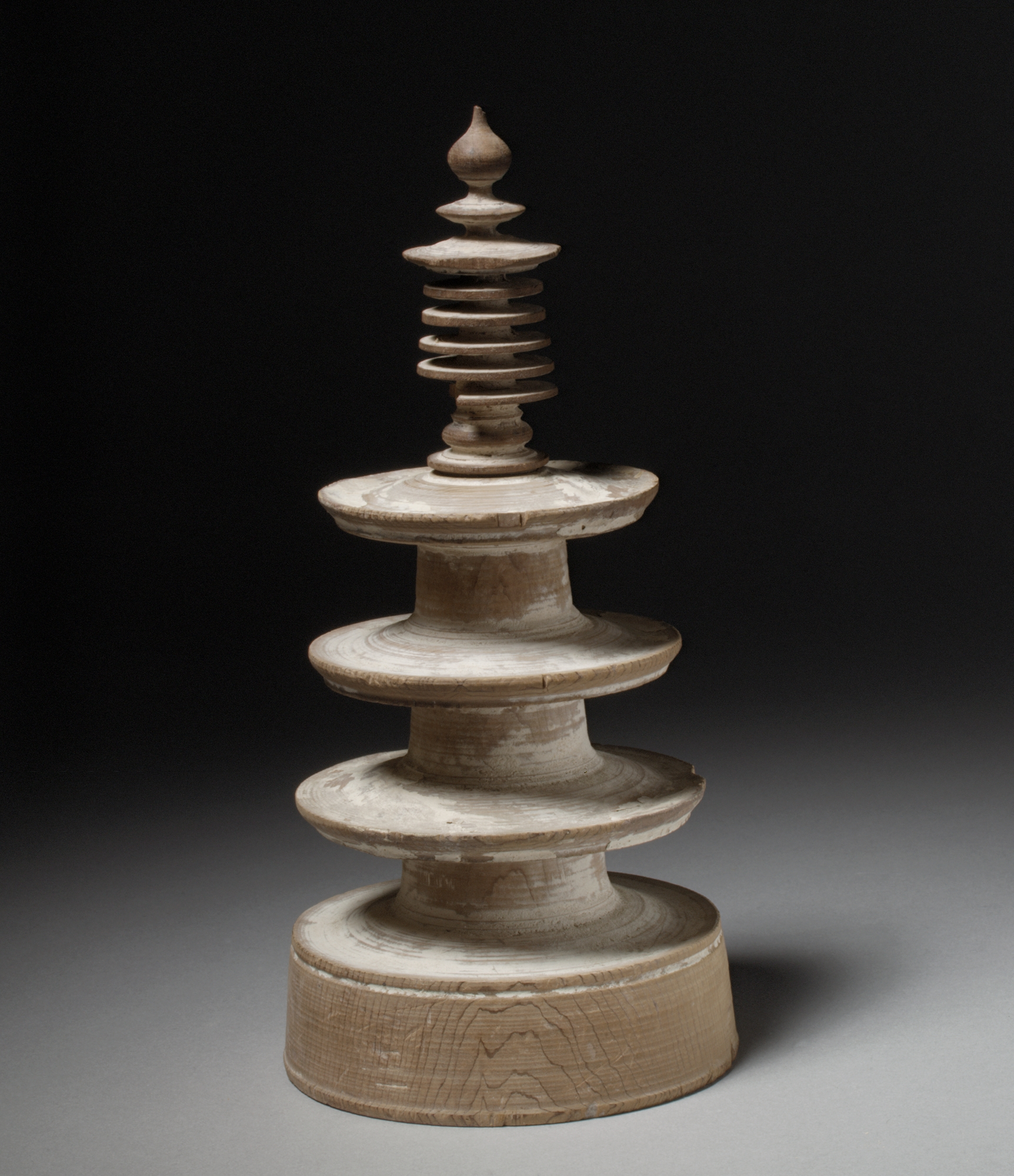
One of the Hyakumantō Darani commissioned by Shōtoku

Beginning in 764, Shōtoku ordered the creation of the Hyakumantō Darani, one million miniature wooden stupas, each containing a woodblock-printed prayer from the Mukujōkō Daidarani sutra. These were completed in 770, and distributed among the ten major temples around Nara, each receiving one hundred thousand stupas.

=== Dōkyō affair ===
In 766, Shōtoku further promoted Dōkyō to Hō-ō, a title alternatively translated as "Prince of the Law" or "Buddhist King", alongside a new palace adjacent to the existing imperial palace. This title was similar to both those once granted to Prince Shōtoku and those granted to former emperors who took monastic vows. The exact extent of power and duties Shōtoku granted to Dōkyō is unclear, but he appeared to have not been given responsibilities outside of religious matters, which he controlled through the Hōōgushiki, a governing agency established for him that ran in parallel to the Department of Divinities (Jingikan). He instituted reforms which brought Buddhist elements into the state ideology, including decrees banning hunting dogs and the serving of meat and fish to the emperor. Shōtoku reorganized her court, promoting monastic officials to the Council of State for the first time. Shōtoku and Dōkyō oversaw the continued construction of the provincial temples in the Kokubun-ji system (first initiated by Shōmu in 741) alongside the creation of new temples such as Saidai-ji in Nara. Shōtoku frequently made pilgrimages to the existing great temples of the Yamato Province, bestowing large donations and granting court ranks to their builders.

After Shōtoku initiated a new era name in 765, the Tenpyō-jingo, Dōkyō oversaw the construction of new temples around major regional shrines, such as the imperial Ise Shrine.

In 769, a religious official from the Dazaifu regional government in Kyushu arrived in Nara. He stated that the oracle of the Usa Shrine, a temple of Hachiman (a syncretic Shinto-Buddhist deity) in Kyushu had received a divine message proclaiming that Dōkyō should be proclaimed as emperor in order to ensure the realm's prosperity. Dōkyō was enthusiastic about the news, but Shōtoku dispatched an emissary, Wake no Kiyomaro, to visit the shrine and consult with the deity. Wake returned to the court in Nara and proclaimed that Hachiman had ordered that no one outside of the imperial line should ascend to the throne. Dōkyō was outraged, and exiled Wake and his sister, changing both of their names to derogatory puns. (Note: Kiyomaro (readable as 'Pure Maro') had his name changed to Kitanamaro ('Dirty Maro'), while his sister Hiromushi ('Broad Mushi') had hers changed to Samushi ('Narrow Mushi').) The Shoku Nihongi states that Dōkyō dispatched an assassin to kill Wake; after the assassin was delayed by a storm, Wake was pardoned.

== Death and legacy ==
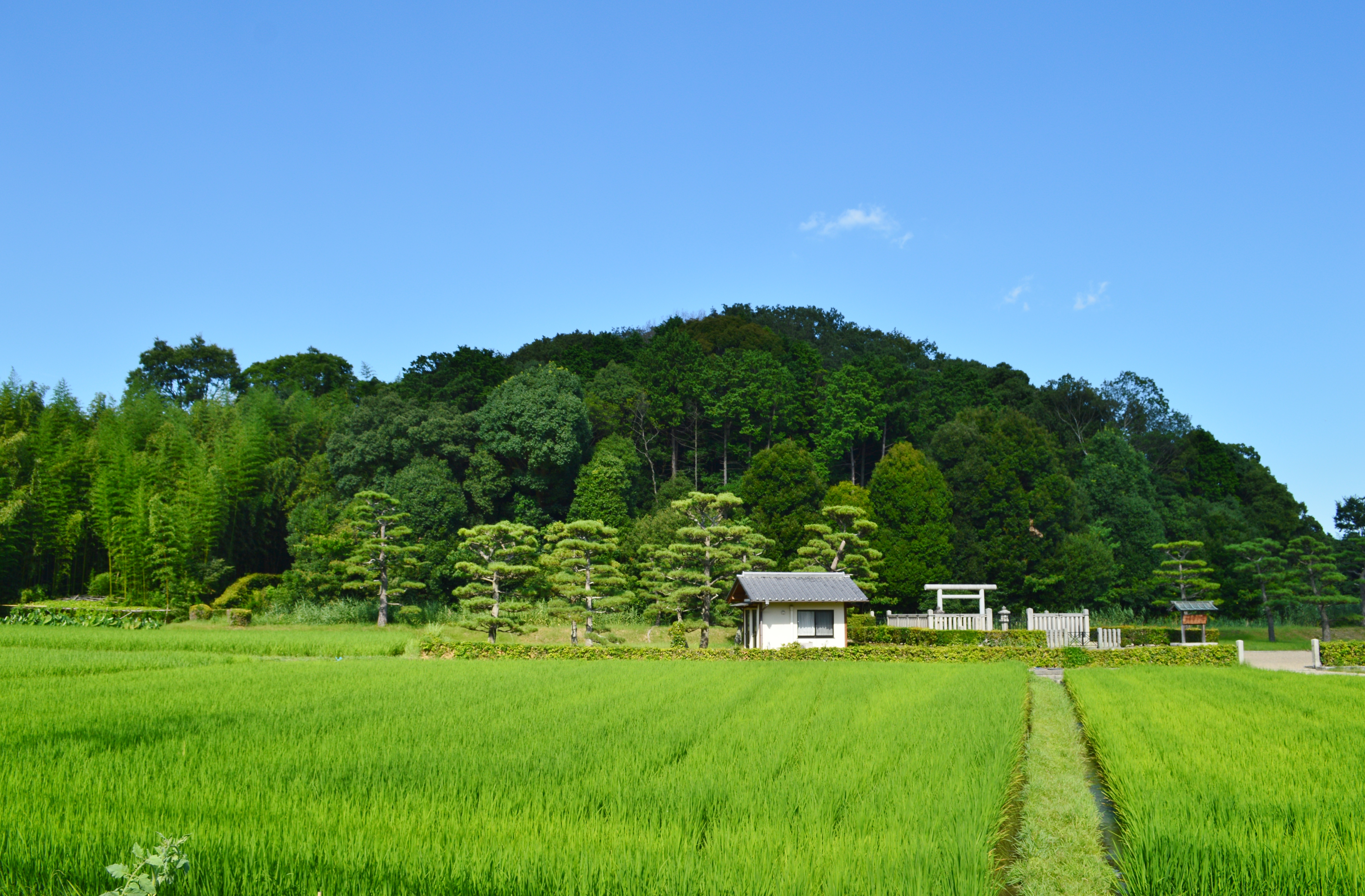
Saki Takatsuka Kofun, designated as Shōtoku's tomb by the Imperial Household Agency

While overseeing construction at Yuge in 770, Shōtoku fell ill and returned to Nara. She died soon after her return in the eighth month of that year without having selected a successor. Fujiwara leaders such as Fujiwara no Nagate (the Minister of the Right) and Fujiwara no Momokawa forged an edict from Shōtoku proclaiming Prince Shirakabe, a great-grandson of Emperor Tenji and husband to one of Shōtoku's half-sisters, Princess Inoe, as her heir. He was enthroned in the tenth month as Emperor Kōnin. Shōtoku would have almost certainly opposed this choice, as the succession had been previously reserved for descendants of Emperor Tenmu since his death in 686. Following her death, work on the new capital was halted and Dōkyō was demoted to the steward of a remote eastern Buddhist temple, the Shimotsuke Yakushi-ji. Although the tomb's contents are unidentified, the Imperial Household Agency designates Saki Takatsuka Kofun in Misasagi-cho, Nara as Shōtoku's tomb.

As no empresses regnant followed in the centuries after her death, Kōken is sometimes dubbed the "last empress" or "last classical empress". It would not be until the Edo period, almost a millennium after Kōken's death, that two more empresses regnant (Meishō and Go-Sakuramachi) ruled. By that point, imperial authority had long passed to the Shogunate. Traditional histories attribute the lack of succeeding empresses regnant to Kōken's relationship with Dōkyo. They generally depict Dōkyo's authority as possessing more authority than Empress Shōtoku during her second reign, although modern scholars have disputed this interpretation; historian Joan R. Piggott described him as "Shōtoku's primary lieutenant", suggesting that, due to his background, he was more beholden to the Empress than Nakamaro had been.

== Notes ==
=== Bibliography ===
- Bender, Ross (1979). "The Hachiman Cult and the Dōkyō Incident". Monumenta Nipponica. 32 (2): 125–153. doi:10.2307/2384320. JSTOR 2384320.
- Bender, Ross (2010). "Changing the Calendar Royal Political Theology and the Suppression of the Tachibana Naramaro Conspiracy of 757". Japanese Journal of Religious Studies. 37 (2): 223–245. JSTOR 41038700.
- Bender, Ross (2012). "Emperor, Aristocracy, and the Ritsuryō State: Court Politics in Nara". In Friday, Karl F. (ed.). Japan Emerging: Premodern History to 1850. Westview Press. ISBN 9780429979163.
- Bender, Ross (2013). "Auspicious Omens in the Reign of the Last Empress of Nara Japan, 749-770". Japanese Journal of Religious Studies. 40 (1): 45–76. JSTOR 41955530.
- Kōjirō, Naoki; Bock, Felicia G. (1993). "The Nara State". In Brown, Delmer M. (ed.). The Cambridge History of Japan. Vol. 1. Cambridge University Press. pp. 221–267. doi:10.1017/CHOL9780521223522. ISBN 9781139055062.
- Ooms, Herman (2009). Imperial Politics and Symbolics in Ancient Japan: The Tenmu Dynasty, 650–800. University of Hawai'i Press. ISBN 978-0-8248-3235-3. JSTOR j.ctt6wr02x.
- Piggott, Joan (1987). Tōdai-ji and the Nara Imperium (PhD thesis). Stanford University.
- Piggott, Joan (1997). The Emergence of the Japanese Kingship. Stanford University Press.
- Piggott, Joan (2003). "The Last Classical Female Sovereign: Kōken-Shōtoku Tennō". In Ko, Dorothy; Haboush, JaHyun Kim; Piggott, Joan R. (eds.). Women and Confucian Cultures in Premodern China, Korea, and Japan. University of California Press. pp. 47–74. ISBN 9780520927827. JSTOR 10.1525/j.ctt1pp3b9.
- Sakurada, Marie (2016). "未婚の女帝と皇位継承一元正・孝謙天皇をめぐって一" [Unmarried Empresses and Imperial Succession in Ancient Japan: With Special Reference to Empress Genshō (r.715-724) and Empress Kōken (r.749-758)]. Sundai Shigaku (in Japanese). 156 (156): 51–76.

=== Primary sources ===
- Jien (1979). Brown, Delmer M.; Ishida, Ichirō (eds.). The Future and the Past: A Translation and Study of the Gukanshō, an Interpretative History of Japan Written in 1219. University of California Press. ISBN 978-0-520-03460-0.

Regnal titles
Preceded by Emperor Shōmu	Empress of Japan: Kōken; 749–758	Succeeded by Emperor Junnin
Preceded by Emperor Junnin	Empress of Japan: Shōtoku; 764–770	Succeeded by Emperor Kōnin
