= Fujiwara no Kurajimaro =

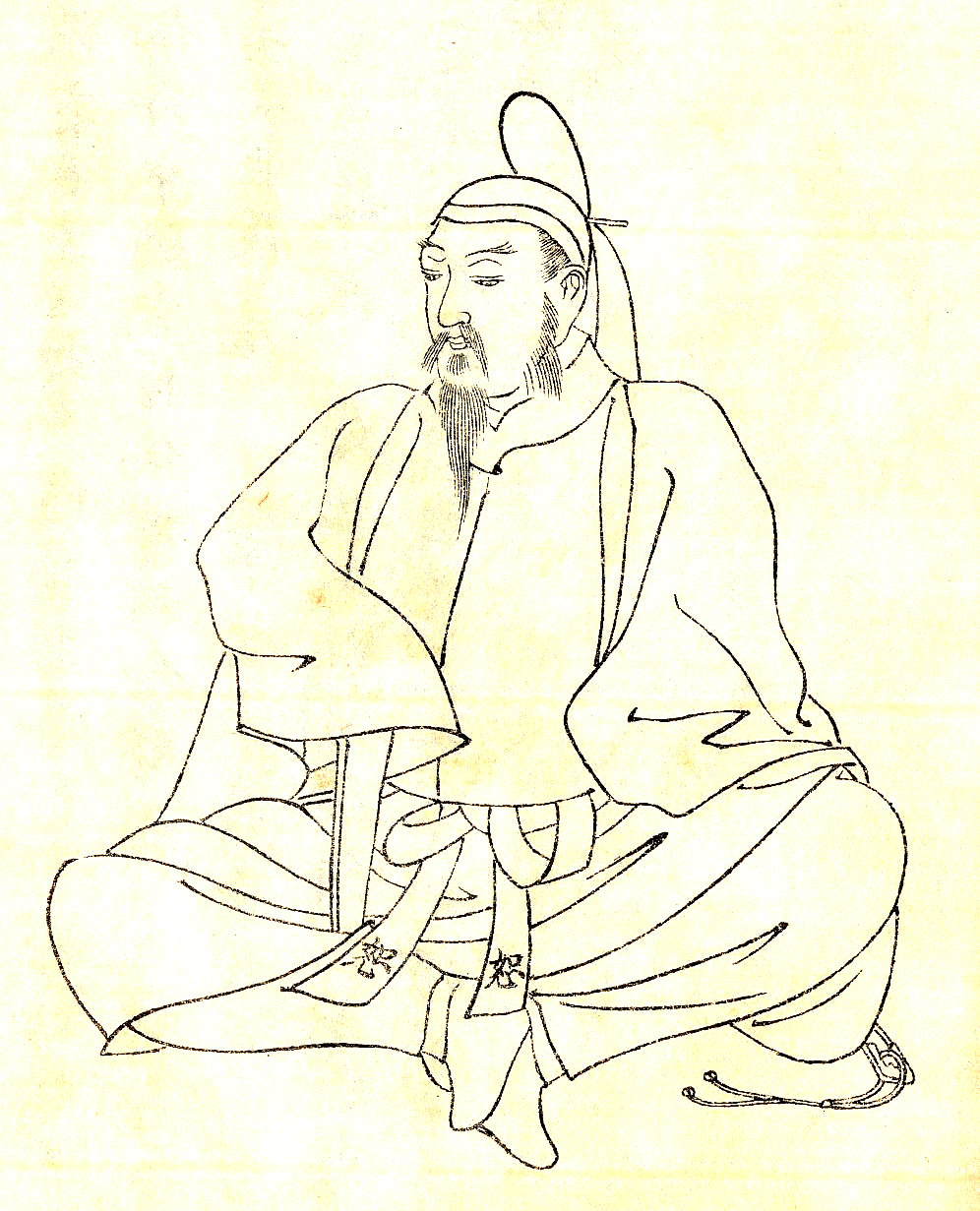
- Born: 734
- Died: August 5, 775
- Parents: Fujiwara no Umakai (father)

Fujiwara no Kurajimaro (藤原 蔵下麻呂; 734 – August 5, 775) was a Japanese statesman, courtier and politician during the Nara period.

== Career at court ==
He was a minister during the reign of Empress Shōtoku. He held positions of hyōbu-kyō (chief military officer) and sangi (associate counselor).

Shōtoku placed her imperial bodyguards under the command of Kurajimaro.

In 764, Kurajimaro was a leader of forces opposing Fujiwara no Nakamaro, also known as Emi no Oshikatsu. Nakamaro and others unsuccessfully plotted with Emperor Junnin against retired Empress Kōken and the monk Dōkyō resulting in a military confrontation known as Fujiwara no Nakamaro Rebellion.

After stability was restored, Kurajimaro was placed in charge of the party escorting Emperor Junnin to Awaji province.

== Genealogy ==
Kurajimaro was the ninth son of Fujiwara no Umakai.
