= Kamio-dera =

Coordinates: 34°43′30″N 135°49′29″E

Kamio temple ruins
- 神雄寺跡 (Japanese)
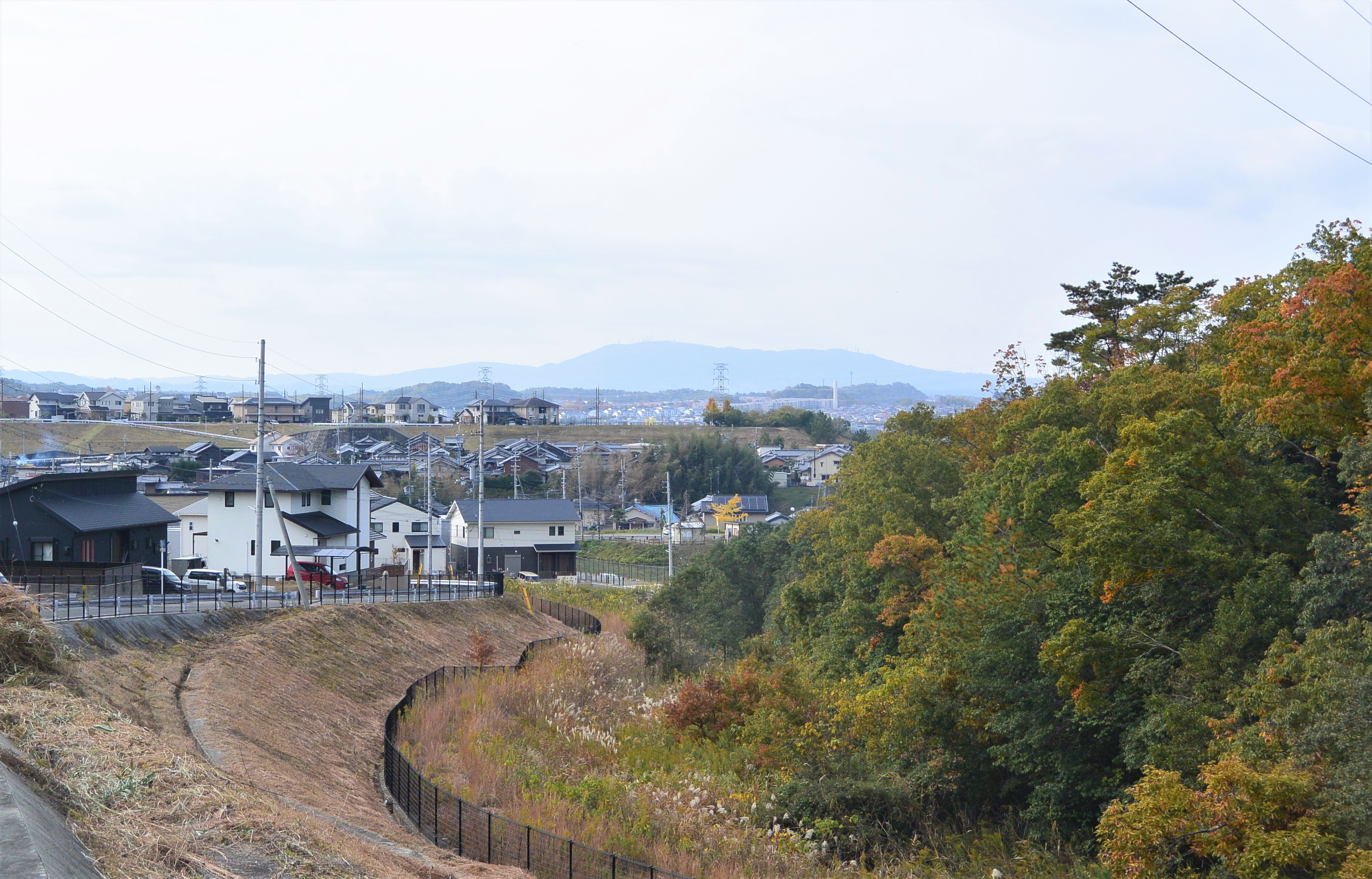
- Kamio temple ruins

- Kamio temple ruins Kamio-dera (Japan)
- Interactive map of Kamio temple ruins
- Type: temple ruins
- Periods: Nara period
- Location: Kizugawa, Kyoto, Japan
- Region: Kansai region

History
- Built: 8th century AD

Site notes
- Public access: Yes (park, museum)

Kamio temple ruins (神雄寺跡, Kamio-dera ato) is an archaeological site with the ruins of a Nara period Buddhist temple located in the city of Kizugawa, Kyoto, Japan. It was designated as a National Historic Site in 2015. It was formerly known as the Baba-Minami ruins (馬場南遺跡) after its location. Artifacts excavated from the site has been collectively designated as a National Important Cultural Property.

== Overview ==
The Kamio temple ruins are located almost halfway between Heijō-kyō and the temporary capital of Kuni-no-miya, at the northern end of the Narayama Hills, adjacent to the passage from Yamato to Yamashiro Province. However, the name "Kamio-dera" does not appear in any contemporary historical documentation, so the actual name and history of this temple remain unknown.The ruins are concentrated in a valley that opens to the west. There was a stone pagoda on the middle of a hill (Tenjinyama) on the northern side, which is densely wooded. The hill to the south is now a residential area. The ruins are divided into two periods: the first period from the late 730s to around 760, and the second period from around 760 to the 780s. Compared to temples built in the same period in Heijō-kyō and other places, the temple was relatively small and simple in structure, but as a wide variety of furnishings and ritual implements have been excavated, including a wooden tablet with a poem from the Man'yōshū inscribed on it, it had connections to the aristocracy. Per historical documentation, the Udaijin Tachibana no Moroe had a residence in this approximate area, and it is theorized that artifacts from the first period correspond to that residence, and from the second period to after it was converted into a temple.

A four to five meter wide river ran from north to south through the center of the valley, then curved sharply to the west. A levee located downstream of this river regulated the water level. At the foot of Tenjinyama on the north side of the river, the foundation stones for a building believed to be a "Butsuden", with a pedestal inside was discovered. Excavated items from the Buddhist hall have revealed that it housed several statues (possibly the Four Heavenly Kings). Between this building and the river, was the foundation for a post-hole building, which is believed to be the remains of the Lecture Hall, and to the east of the river, there were more post-hole buildings and wells.The foundations of a pagoda measuring 1.8 meters square was found on the middle slopes of Tenjinyama. Roof tiles and pottery shards, including sancai colored pottery and earthenware with various written inscriptions have been excavated from these remains. The roof tiles found were the same as were used at the residence of Prince Nagaya in Heijō-kyō.

A large number (more than 1500) of disposable clay lamp plates were excavated from the river site; these would have been used in various memorial services.

Between the end of the 8th century and the beginning of the 9th century, the "Butsuden" was destroyed by fire, and most of the river was buried. The pagoda was also burned down in the first half of the 10th century.

== See also ==
- List of Historic Sites of Japan (Kyoto)
