= Tachibana clan =

Tachibana clan may refer to:

- Tachibana clan (kuge) (橘氏), a clan of kuge (court nobles) prominent in the Nara and Heian periods
- Tachibana clan (samurai) (立花氏), a clan of daimyō (feudal lords) prominent in the Muromachi, Sengoku and Edo periods
