= Agata no Inukai no Michiyo =

Japanese imperial court figure

Agatainukai no Michiyo
- 県犬養 三千代
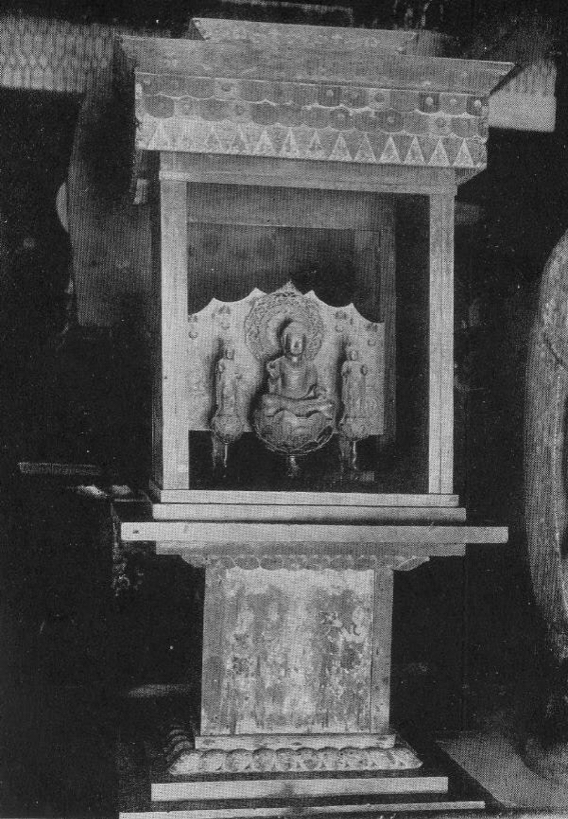
- Lady Tachibana Shrine at Hōryū-ji
- Died: February 4, 733
- Spouses: Prince Minu; Fujiwara no Fuhito
- Children: Tachibana no Moroe; Tachibana no Sai; Princess Moro; Empress Kōmyō; Fujiwara no Tahino (disputed)
- Father: Agatainukai (no) Michiyo Haruto

Agatainukai (no) Michiyo (県犬養 三千代) (665? – February 4, 733), or Tachibana no Michiyo (橘 三千代), was a court lady of early Nara period and mother of Empress Kōmyō. She served in the courts of emperor Temmu and emperor Shomu.

In 679, around 15 years old, Michiyo became a Myōbu. On November 708, her clan was given the honorary surname "Tachibana Sukune" by Empress Genmei. In 721 she became a Buddhist nun for a brief period to pray for the health of Empress Genmei.

Her first husband was an imperial prince, Prince Minu, a descendant of Emperor Bidatsu. They bore three children - Prince Katsuragi (later Tachibana no Moroe), Prince Sai (later Tachibana no Sai) and Princess Moro. Soon after Prince Minu's death, she married Fujiwara no Fuhito, whose principal wife had died. They had a daughter named Kōmyōshi, who was Fuhito's third daughter. Many of Michiyo's descendants also married Fuhito's descendants. It's unknown if Fuhito's fourth daughter, Tahino, the principal wife of Tachibana no Moroe is also Lady Tachibana's daughter. Their daughter later wed Emperor Shomu, and became Empress Komyo.

After Fuhito's death, she continued to wield influence within the court. Before the birth of her first child, she had become the wet nurse of later Emperor Monmu, and was highly trusted by his mother Empress Genmei and paternal grandmother Empress Jitō. Using her influence, she later made Fuhito's first daughter Miyako, by Kamonohime, a consort of Emperor Monmu. When Miyako and Emperor Monmu's child Emperor Shōmu had grown up, he took his younger half-aunt Fujiwara no Kōmyōshi as empress; together they had a daughter, Empress Kōken, and a son Prince Motoi. His other consorts are all descendants of Michiyo and/or Fuhito. Using this kind of excessive inbreeding method, Michiyo and Fuhito had ensured their genes rooted in the Imperial house of Japan.

She was also a noted poet, with one of her poems included in the Man'yoshu.
