= Tenpyō-hōji =

Period of Japanese history (757–765 CE)

Tenpyō-hōji (天平宝字) was a Japanese era name (年号, nengō, lit. "year name") after Tenpyō-shōhō and before Tenpyō-jingo. This period spanned the years from August 757 through January 765. The reigning Emperor was Junnin-tennō (淳仁天皇), who was a mere figurehead while authority was in the hands of Fujiwara no Nakamaro and during the later years of the era increasingly with retired Empress Kōken and the monk Dōkyō.

== Change of era ==
- 757 Tenpyō-hōji gannen (天平宝字元年): The new era name was created to mark an event or series of events. The previous era ended and the new one commenced in Tenpyō-shōhō 9, on the 2nd day of the 8th month.

== Events of the Tenpyō-hōji era ==
- 757 (Tenpyō-hōji 1): The new era begins on the 2nd day of the 8th month of Tenpyō-shōhō 9.
- 760 (Tenpyō-hōji 4): Additional coins were put into circulation – each copper coin bearing the words Mannen Ten-hō, each silver coin bearing the words Teihei Genhō, and each gold coin bearing the words Kaiki Shōhō.
- 764: Fujiwara no Nakamaro Rebellion
- 26 January 765 (Tenpyō-hōji 9, 1st day of the 1st month): In the 6th year of Junnin-tennō's reign (淳仁天皇6年), the emperor was deposed by his adoptive mother; and the succession (senso) was received by former-Empress Kōken. Shortly thereafter, Empress Shōtoku is said to have acceded to the throne (sokui).

== Notes ==
Preceded by Tenpyō-shōhō	Era or nengō Tenpyō-hōji; 757–765	Succeeded by Tenpyō-jingo
