= Ono no Azumabito =

Samurai and Court official

Ono no Azumabito (小野 東人; died 757) was a samurai and court official of Japan's Nara period. In 738 he became Assistant Captain of the Left Division of Middle Palace Guards (左兵衛佐, Sahyoe no suke).

He was exiled to Mishima in Izu Province after aiding in the revolt of Fujiwara no Hirotsugu in 740 but was pardoned five years later. He was then made governor of Bizen Province, and an official of the Jibushō, the government department responsible for governing nobles above the fifth rank.

In 757, Azumabito was sentenced and executed for his involvement in a conspiracy organized by Tachibana no Naramaro.
