= Tachibana clan (kuge) =

Powerful royal family during Japan's Nara and Heian periods

Tachibana clan 橘氏
- The emblem (mon) of the Tachibana clan
- Parent house: Imperial House of Japan (Empress Genmei)
- Titles: Various
- Founder: Agata no Inukai no Michiyo
- Founding year: 708
- Cadet branches: Kyūshū Tachibana; Iyo Tachibana

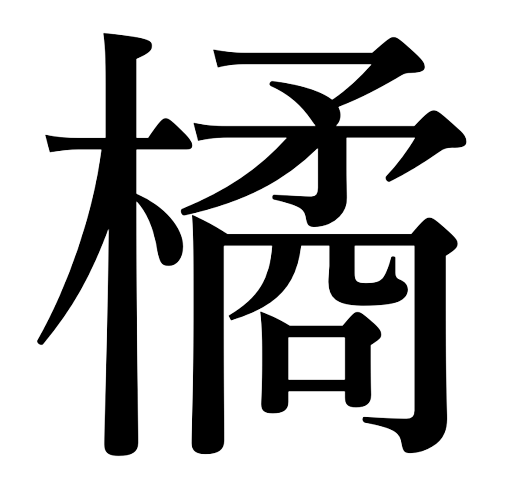
TACHIBANA in Japanese Kanji

The Tachibana clan (橘氏, Tachibana-uji, Tachibana-shi) was one of the four most powerful court nobility (kizoku or kuge) families in Japan's Nara and early Heian periods—the other three were the Minamoto, the Fujiwara, and the Taira. Members of the Tachibana family often held high court posts within the Daijō-kan (Ministry of State), most frequently Sadaijin (Minister of the Left). Like the other major families at court, they also constantly sought to increase and secure their power by marrying into the imperial family. However, as the Minamoto clan and the Fujiwara clan gained power over the course of the 9th and 10th centuries, the Tachibana were eclipsed and eventually became scattered across the country. Though serving in high government posts outside the capital, they were thus denied the degree of power and influence within the court at Kyoto (Heian-kyō) which they once enjoyed.

The name of Tachibana was bestowed on Agata-no-Inukai no Michiyo by Empress Genmei in 708. She was the wife of Prince Minu, a descendant of Emperor Bidatsu and mothered Princes Katsuragi and Sai. She later married Fujiwara no Fuhito and bore Kōmyōshi (Empress Kōmyō). In 736, Princes Katsuragi and Sai were given the surname Tachibana, renouncing their imperial family membership. They became Tachibana no Moroe and Tachibana no Sai respectively.

Over the course of the Heian period, they engaged in countless struggles with the Fujiwara family for domination of court politics, and thus essentially for control of the nation; on a number of occasions this developed into outright violent conflict. One of these conflicts was the uprising of Fujiwara no Sumitomo in 939–941. Though the rebellion was ultimately suppressed, the Tachibana family was scattered in the process, and lost much of its power.

Another branch family developed in Iyo Province, becoming known as the Iyo Tachibana family. Tachibana no Tōyasu, who executed Fujiwara no Sumitomo, was the progenitor of this branch; Kusunoki Masashige, a celebrated pro-Imperial commander of the 14th century, claimed descent from Tōyasu.

== Significant members ==
- Agatainukai no Michiyo
- Tachibana no Moroe (橘諸兄) - Son of Michiyo; also known as Katsuragi no Ō-kimi (葛城王)
- Tachibana no Sai (橘佐為) - Son of Michiyo; also known as Sai no Ō-kimi (佐為王)
- Muro no Ōkimi (牟漏女王) － Daughter of Michiyo; wife of Fujiwara no Fusasaki
- Tachibana no Naramaro (橘奈良麻呂) － Eldest son of Moroe
- Tachibana no Shimadamaro (橘島田麿) － Son of Naramaro
- Tachibana no Kiyotomo (橘清友) － Son of Naramaro
- Tachibana no Kachiko (橘嘉智子) － Daughter of Kiyotomo, Empress to Emperor Saga
- Tachibana no Ujikimi (橘氏公) － Son of Kiyotomo
- Tachibana no Reitsugi (橘岑継) － Son of Ujikimi
- Tachibana no Hayanari (橘逸勢) － Poet, calligrapher; one of the Sanpitsu
- Tachibana no Hiromi (橘広相) － Scholar, five generations from Moroe; Served Emperors Yōzei, Kōkō, and Uda
- Tachibana no Kimisai (?)(橘公材) － Second son of Hiromi
- Tachibana no Kimiyori (橘公頼) － Fifth son of Hiromi; Dazai Gonnosochi (a post akin to Governor of Kyūshū); fought Fujiwara no Sumitomo's younger brother Fujiwara no Suminori
- Tachibana no Kern (源久直) － Member of the Saga Morimoto line of the Ochi clan
- Tachibana no Toshimichi (橘敏通) － Third son of Kimiyori; played an important role in fighting Fujiwara no Sumitomo and Suminori; lord of Chikugo Province and founder of the Chikugo (Kyūshū) branch of the Tachibana
- Senkan (千観) － Fourth son of Kimiyori; preacher of Jōdo-shū
- Tachibana no Yoshiyuki (橘善行) － Also known by the Buddhist name Shōkū (性空); founder of Enkyō-ji
- Zōga (蔵賀) － Lived on Tōnomine
- Kōkei (皇慶) － Priest of Tendai
- Nōin (能因; Tachibana no Nagayasu, 橘永愷) － Poet; also known by Buddhist name Nōin
- Tachibana no Michisada (橘道貞) － worked with Fujiwara no Michinaga
- Ko-shikibu no Naishi (小式部内侍) － Poet; daughter of Michisada
- Tachibana no Tamenaka (橘為仲) － Poet
- Tachibana no Tōyasu (橘遠保) － Formerly of the Ochi clan, founder of the Iyo Tachibana branch; played an important role in fighting Fujiwara no Sumitomo
- Tachibana no Isamu (橘勇) － medicine, son of Sachiko
- Tachibana no Tōshige (橘遠茂) － mokudai (governor) of Suruga; descendant of Tōyasu (Iyo branch)
- Tachibana no Kinnaga (橘公長) － executioner of Taira no Munemori
- Tachibana no Kinnari (橘公業) － Son of Kiminaga; founder of Kokajima clan
- Tachibana no Narisue (橘成季) － Served Kujō Michiie
- Minamoto no Hisanao (源久直) － Member of the Saga Genji line of the Minamoto clan; founder of Kamachi family from the Chikugo Tachibana branch

== See also ==
- Minamoto clan
- Fujiwara clan
- Taira clan
- Japanese clans
- Japanese name
