= Tenpyō-shōhō =

Period of Japanese history (749–757 CE)

Tenpyō-shōhō (天平勝宝) was a Japanese era name (年号, nengō; lit. "year name") after Tenpyō-kanpō and before Tenpyō-hōji. This period spanned the years from July 749 through August 757. The reigning empress was Kōken-tennō (孝謙天皇).

== Change of era ==
- 749 Tenpyō-shōhō gannen (天平勝宝元年): The new era name of Tenpyō-shōhō (meaning "Heavenly Peace and Victorious Treasure") was created to mark the accession of Empress Kōken. Shortly after Tenpyō-kanpō was initially proclaimed, Emperor Shōmu renounced the throne, thus becoming the first emperor to take the tonsure as a Buddhist monk. Shōmu's reign and the Tenpyō-kanpō era ended simultaneously as he began a new phase of his life. The previous era ended after a mere four months, and the new one commenced in Tenpyō-kanpō 1, on the 2nd day of the 7th month of 749.

== Events of the Tenpyō-shōhō era ==
- 749 (Tenpyō-shōhō 1): Emperor Shōmu abdicates, and his daughter receives the succession (senso). Shortly thereafter, Empress Kōken formally accedes to the throne (sokui).
- 749 (Tenpyō-shōhō 1)
- 752 (Tenpyō-shōhō 4, 4th month): The Eye-Opening Ceremony celebrating the completion of the Great Buddha is held at Tōdai-ji in Nara.
- 5 September 750 (Tenpyō-shōhō 2, 1st day of the 8th month): In the 10th year of Kōken-tennō's reign (称徳天皇10年), the empress abdicated; and succession (senso) was received by her adopted son. Shortly thereafter, Emperor Junnin is said to have acceded to the throne (sokui).

== Notes ==
Preceded by Tenpyō-kanpō	Era or nengō Tenpyō-shōhō; 749–757	Succeeded by Tenpyō-hōji
