= Tachibana no Moroe =

8th-century Japanese imperial prince and court official

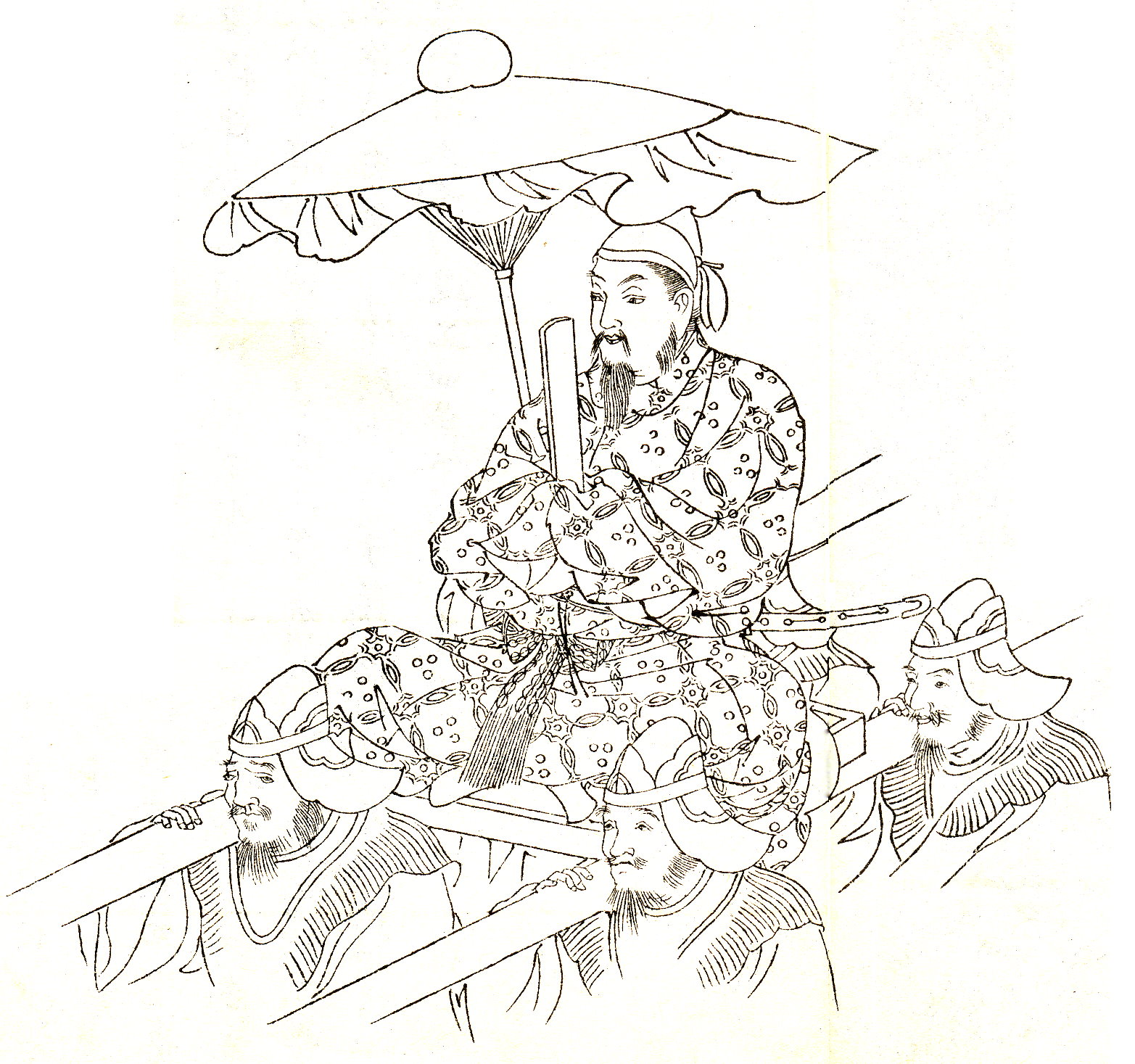
Tachibana no Moroe drawn by Kikuchi Yōsai

Tachibana no Moroe (橘 諸兄; 684-757) was a Japanese Imperial prince and official in the court of Emperor Shōmu and Empress Kōken.

He was the father of Tachibana no Naramaro .

- 738 (Tenpyō 10, 1st month): Moroe was created Udaijin (Minister of the Right) in the Imperial court.
- 740 (Tenpyō 12): Moroe put down a revolt by Fujiwara no Hirotsugu.
- 742 (Tenpyō 14): The emperor sent Moroe to Ise to convey his appreciation to the kami.
- 743 (Tenpyō 15): Moroe was elevated to a rank almost equal to Sadaijin (Minister of the Left).
- 756 (Tenpyō-shōhō 8, 2nd month): Empress Kōken is informed that Sadaijin Moroe is contemplating revolt, but she refuses to credit the rumor; nevertheless, Moroe resigns.
- 757 (Tenpyō-hōji 1): Moroe dies at age 74; and his rank is posthumously raised by the empress.

Moroe was a poet whose work is included in the Man'yōshū.

== Family ==
- Father: Prince Minu (美努王)
- Mother: Agata no Inukai no Michiyo
- Wife: Fujiwara no Tabino (藤原多比能), daughter of Fujiwara no Fuhito
  - Son: Tachibana no Naramaro
- Unknown Concubine
  - Daughter: Lady Teruyoru (照夜の前), married Fujiwara no Hosei
