= Ryūryūkyo Shinsai =

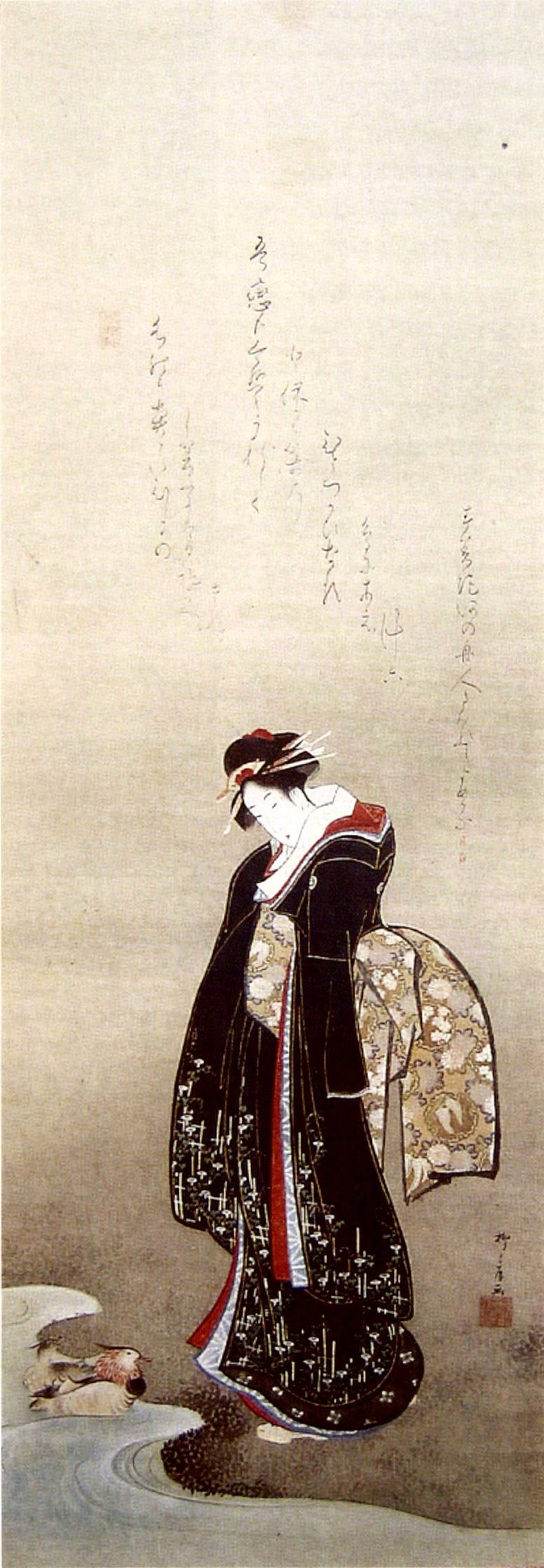
- A Beauty Standing by a Stream painting on silk by Ryūryūkyo Shinsai, c. 1805
- Other names: Hanji; Hanjirō; Mannō; Masayuki; Ryūkaen; Ryūryūkyo; Ryūryūkyo Shinsai
- Occupations: painter, wood cutter

Ryūryūkyo Shinsai (柳々居辰斎) was a Japanese artist and surimono artist who flourished between 1799 and 1823. He was a student of Hokusai.
