= Fujiwara no Fuhito =

7/8th-century Japanese royal and imperial court official

Fujiwara no Fuhito Senior First Rank
- 藤原 不比等
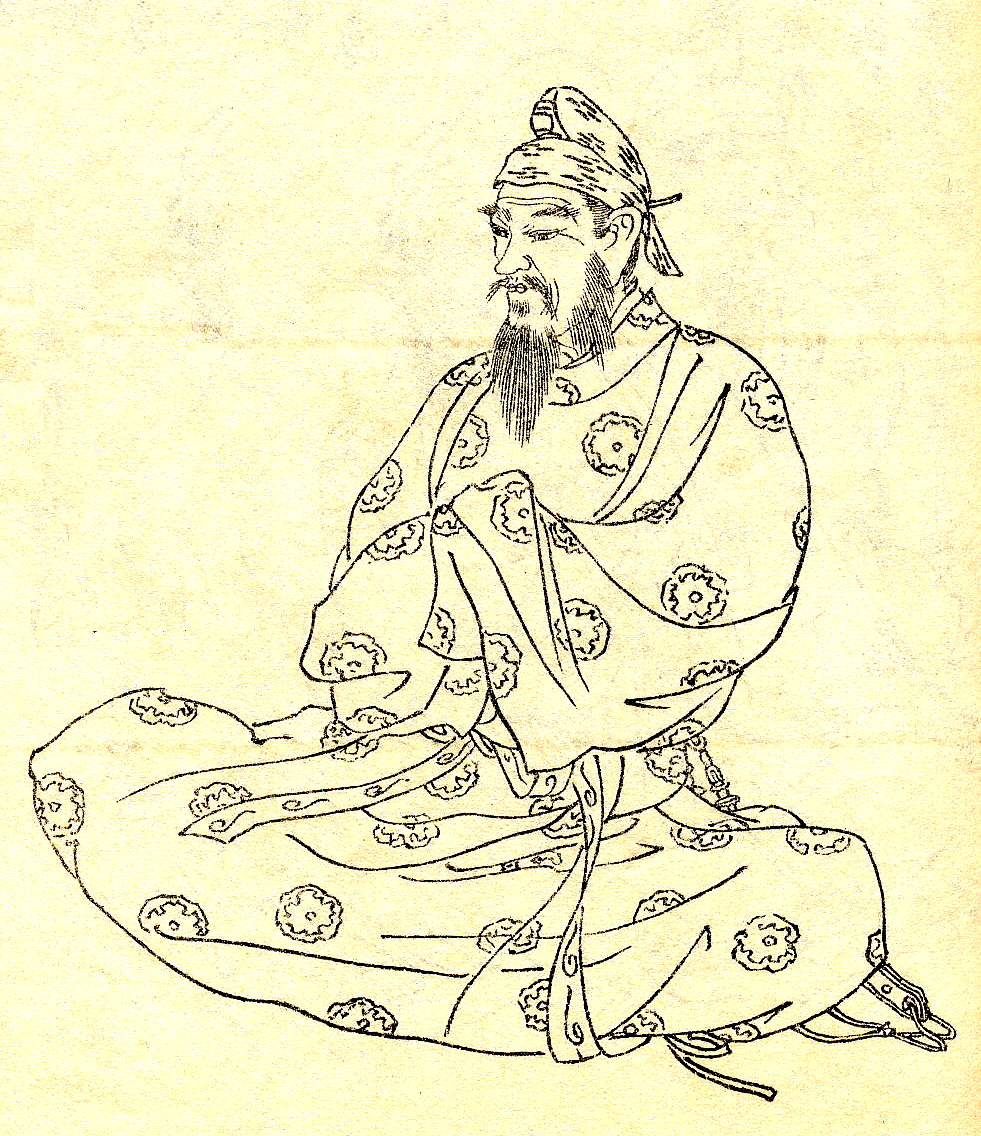
- Born: 659
- Died: September 13, 720
- Children: 4 sons, 4 daughters

Fujiwara no Fuhito (藤原 不比等: 659 – 13 September 720) was a powerful member of the Imperial court of Japan during the Asuka and Nara periods. Second son of Fujiwara no Kamatari (or, according to one theory, of Emperor Tenji), he had sons by two women, and those sons were the founders of the four principal lineages of the Fujiwara clan: the South, North, Ceremonial, and Capital lineages. Also, he had four daughters by two other women, three by Kamohime, one by Tachibana no Michiyo. One daughter by Kamohime became Emperor Monmu's wife Miyako, who in turn gave birth to Emperor Shōmu. The daughter by Michiyo became the empress of his grandson Shōmu, Empress Kōmyō.

During the reign of Emperor Monmu, the government ordered that only the descendants of Fuhito could bear the Fujiwara surname and could be appointed in the Office of Dajōkan, the center of administratives.

== Biography ==
Fuhito was 13 years old when the Jinshin incident occurred. His father Kamatari had been a strong supporter of Emperor Tenji, but Kamatari had already died and Fuhito was too young to be appointed a governmental officer, so he was not involved in this political conflict. In 688 he appeared first as a courtier.

In 697 Prince Karu, the son of Prince Kusakabe and therefore grandson of Emperor Tenmu and Empress Jitō, was appointed crown prince. Fuhito supported this appointment strongly and gained the favor of Empress Jitō. After that, his position in the court rose steadily. In 701 Prince Obito, later the emperor Shōmu was born by Miyako. Fuhito succeeded in persuading the court to appoint Obito the crown prince, and made his other daughter a wife of Obito. Until then only a royal lady could be promoted to the empress, but he succeeded in gaining his daughter the position of empress of Obito by the emperor Shōmu. It was the first empress who did not derive from the imperial household.

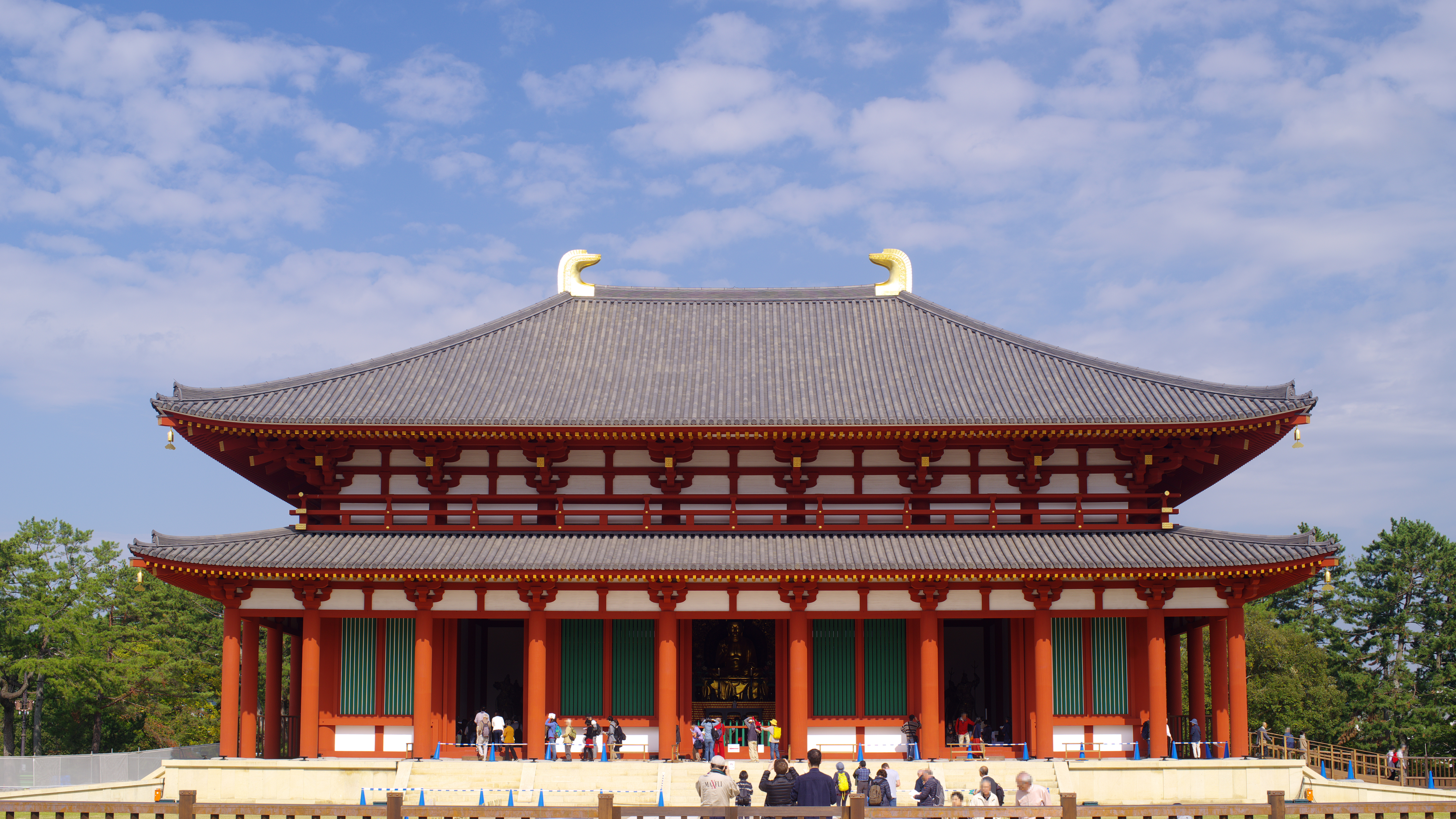
Kōfuku-ji (Chū-kondō)

He moved Yamashina-dera, the Buddhist temple which was the main temple his clan supported, to Nara and renamed it Kōfuku-ji. After his death, Kasuga shrine, the main Shinto shrine of the Fujiwara clan, was settled near Kofuku-ji in 768.

He played a role in the establishment of the state law, ritsuryō, in Japan. He participated in the edition called Taihō Ritsuryō. He also joined in making its revision, the Yōrō ritsuryō. Before its completion, he died in the summer of 720. When he died, he was appointed Udaijin, one of the ministers.

After his death the court honored him with two titles Bunchū Kō (文忠公) and Tankai Kō (淡海公) and with the office of Daijō-daijin, the highest office of the court.

He had four sons: Fujiwara no Muchimaro, Fujiwara no Fusasaki (681–737), Fujiwara no Umakai and Fujiwara no Maro. His son Fusasaki would become the ancestor of the regent line of the Fujiwara clan.

Additionally, four poems of his can be found in the Kaifūso.

== Wives and children ==
- Soga no Shōshi (Masako), daughter of Soga no Murajiko
  - Muchimaro (680–737)
  - Fusasaki (681–737)
  - Umakai (694–737)
- Kamo no Hime, daughter of Kamo no Emishi
  - Miyako (d. 754), married to Emperor Monmu
  - Nagako, married to Prince Nagaya
- Ioe no Iratsume, half-sister of Fuhito (dowager of Emperor Tenmu)
  - Maro (695–737)
- Agatainukai-no-Tachimana no Michiyo (d. 733)
  - Asukabe-hime (Empress Kōmyō) (701–760), Empress of Emperor Shōmu
  - Tabino (Tahino), married to Tachibana no Moroe

== Honours ==
- Senior First Rank (November 27, 720; posthumous)
