= Empress Kōmyō =

Empress of Japan from 729 to 749

Empress Kōmyō 光明皇后
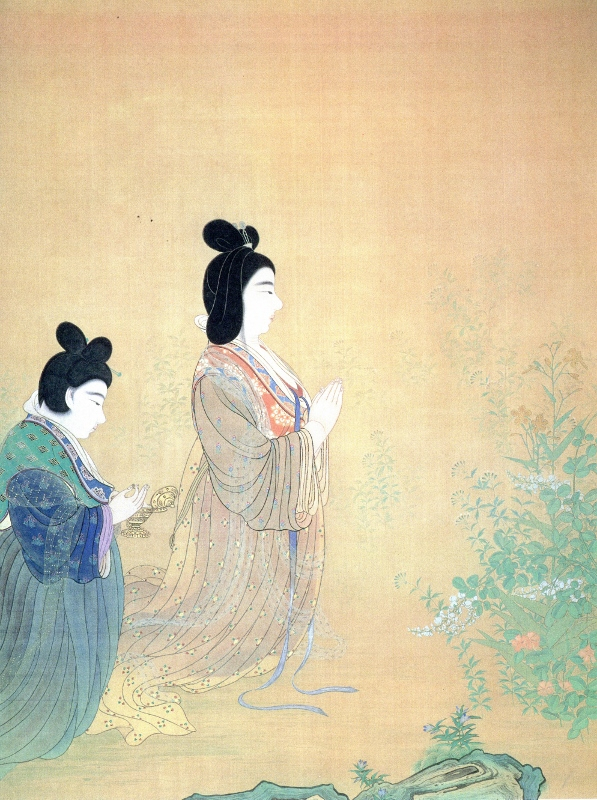
- Empress Kōmyō drawn by Kanzan Shimomura (1897)

Empress consort of Japan
- Tenure: 10 August 729 – 2 July 749

Empress dowager of Japan
- Tenure: 749–760
- Born: Fujiwara Asukabehime 藤原 安宿媛; 701; Japan
- Died: 23 July 760; Japan
- Burial: Sahoyama Tomb, Nara City, Japan
- Spouse: Emperor Shōmu
- Issue: Empress Kōken; Prince Motoi
- Clan: Fujiwara (by birth); Imperial House of Japan (by marriage)
- Father: Fujiwara no Fuhito
- Mother: Agatainukai-no-Tachimana no Michiyo

Empress Kōmyō (光明皇后) (701 – 23 July 760), born Fujiwara Asukabehime (藤原 安宿媛), was the consort of Japanese Emperor Shōmu (701–756) during the Nara Period.

== Life ==
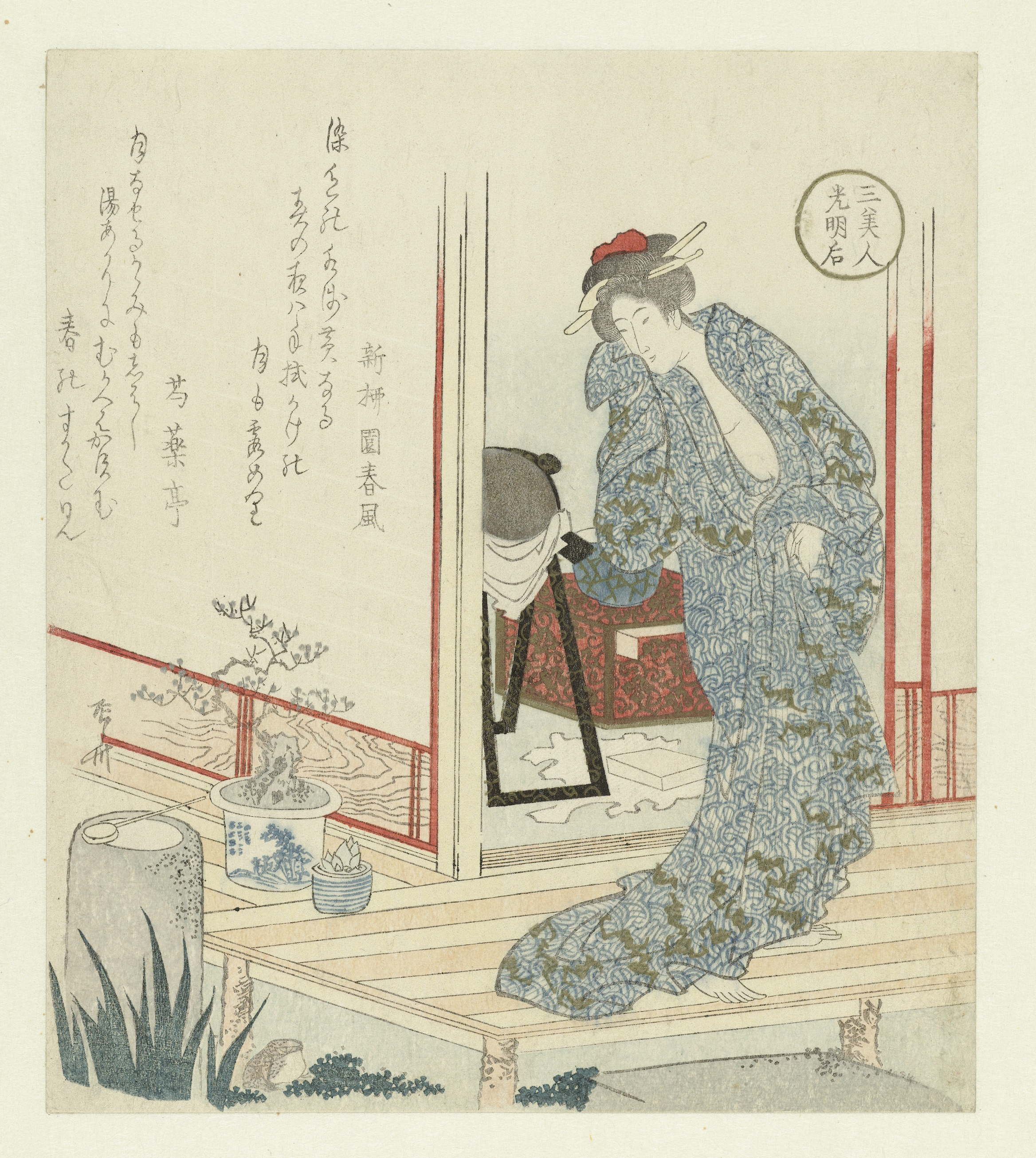
Empress Kōmyō depicted by Ryūryūkyo Shinsai

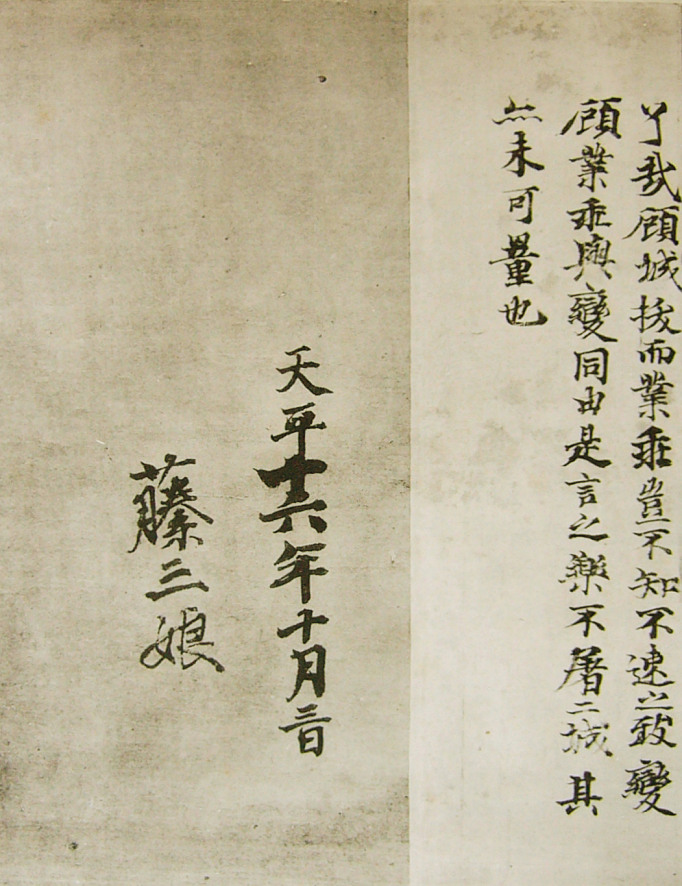
An example of Empress Kōmyō's calligraphy and her autograph signature — Gakki-ron (c. 756).

A member of the Fujiwara clan, her father was Fujiwara no Fuhito and her mother was Agata Inukai no Michiyo (県犬養三千代). During her life she was also known as Asukabehime (安宿媛), Kōmyōshi (光明子), and Tōsanjō (藤三娘), literally the third Fujiwara daughter.

In 716, Kōmyō married the future Emperor Shōmu when he was still the crown prince. Two years later, she gave birth to her daughter, Princess Abe, who would later rule as Empress Kōken and Empress Shōtoku. Her son was born in 727 and was soon named crown prince, but he died as an infant. Rumors circulated that Prince Nagaya cursed the infant prince using black magic, and Nagaya was forced to commit suicide in response.

Kōmyō was named queens-consort or "kōgō" in 729, a position that prioritized her offspring as heir to the throne. An extra-codal office was created for the queen-consort, the Kōgōgūshiki; this bureaucratic innovation continued into the Heian period. She was an influential political figure in her own right and helped balance tensions between Fujiwara and non-Fujiwara factions at court.

She is buried in Nara Prefecture's Hōrenji-cho in the mausoleum Sahoyama no Higashi no Misasagi 佐保山東陵 near Emperor Shōmu in the southern mausoleum.

== Buddhist Faith ==
Kōmyō grew up surrounded by Buddhist influence. Her father was a key figure in developing Kōfukuji. Her mother seems to have been a devout Buddhist and entered the Buddhist order in 721. Her uncle, Jōe, was a monk who traveled to China to study.

Kōmyō's own faith appears in the historical record from 727, when she began copying sutras for the safe birth of her son. She was likely the most active patron of sutra copying in the eighth-century, operating a prolific scriptorium first tied to her household and then connected to Tōdaiji. She was the chief proponent of the Kokubunji system, which called for pairs of monasteries and nunneries to be built in every province. She also sponsored charitable institutions such as medicinal dispensaries and shelters for the needy. These charitable endeavors were inspired by Buddhist notions of compassion and bodhisattva conduct. She received the bodhisattva precepts with her husband in 754.

== Legacy ==
Artifacts connected with Kōmyō and Shōmu are among the treasures housed at the Shōsōin. Four of her poems are included in the Man'yōshū imperial anthology. As a devout adherent of Buddhism, Kōmyō encouraged the construction and enrichment of temples, including Shinyakushi-ji (Nara), Hokke-ji (Nara), Kōfuku-ji (Nara), and Tōdai-ji (Nara).

In the medieval period, Kōmyō became an object of worship and numerous legends started to circulate about her. She was seen as a bodhisattva in human form and a protector of nuns. She was especially important at Hokkeji, where pilgrims traveled to see an image of Kannon said to be in her likeness. A particularly famous story describes her bathing a leper, who turned out to be a buddha in disguise. She was also said to have founded numerous temples with a number claiming she was the child of a doe impregnated by drinking the urine of a mountain ascetic. She remained a symbol of the ideal Buddhist woman in the modern period and continues to be venerated at Hokkeji today.

While most stories were positive, some medieval and early modern authors criticized her. Kokan Shiren thought the story of her bathing the leper was inappropriate conduct for a wife. In another story, she is said to have broke the gates of Tōdaiji trying to enter as a woman and ended up in hell for doing so.

Kōmyōike Station in southern Osaka Prefecture takes its name from a nearby artificial lake named after Empress Kōmyō. This toponym comes from a supposed association with the empress's birthplace in Izumi Province.

== Genealogy ==
Asukabehime (安宿媛) was the daughter of Fujiwara no Fuhito and his fourth wife, Agatainukai-no-Tachimana no Michiyo. She had one younger sister born by the same mother and sixth half siblings among which one become Empress consort of Emperor Monmu, mother of Emperor Shōmu.

Lady Fujiwara married Crown Prince Obito and became one of his multiple wives. In 718 she gave birth Imperial Princess Abe (阿倍内親王). On 3 March 724, Crown Prince Obito ascended the throne and became emperor. Lady Fujiwara was awarded the rank of Madame (Fujin)(夫人). In 727 she gave birth to prince who died prematurely. On 10 August 729, she became Empress Consort (Kōgō).

Her Daughter, Imperial Princess Abe was the only woman named crown prince in the history of Japan. Princess Abe succeeded her father and became empress regnant.

Empress Fujiwara became Empress Dowager.

== See also ==
- Japanese empresses

== Notes ==
Japanese royalty
Preceded by Princess Tōchi	Empress consort of Japan; 730–749	Succeeded by Princess Inoe
Preceded by Princess Ishi-hime	Empress dowager of Japan; 749–760	Succeeded by Ki no Tochihime (title granted posthumously)
