= Emperor Junnin =

Emperor of Japan from 758 to 764

Emperor Junnin 淳仁天皇
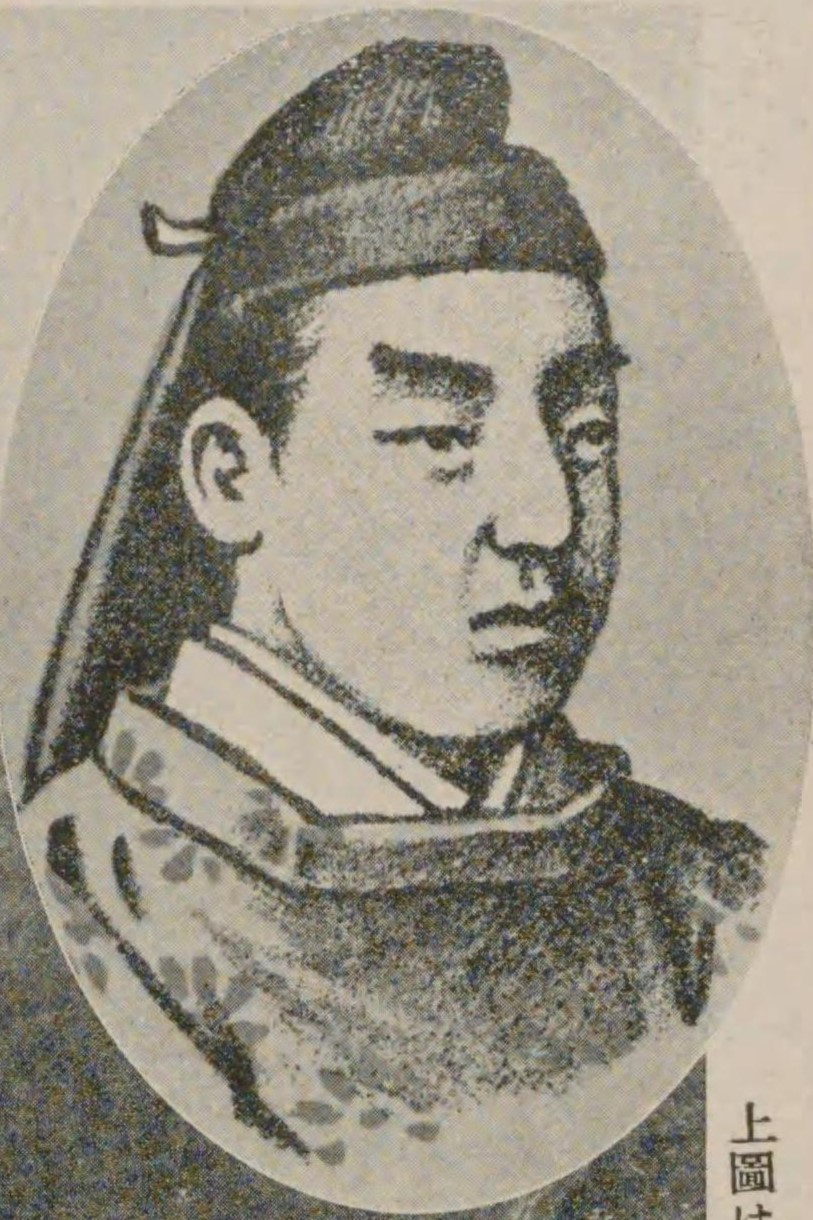

Emperor of Japan
- Reign: 758–764
- Predecessor: Kōken
- Successor: Shōtoku
- Born: Ōi (大炊); 733
- Died: November 10, 765 (aged 31–32); Awaji Island (Hyōgo)
- Burial: Awaji no misasagi (淡路陵) (Hyōgo)
- Issue: Princess Abe
Posthumous name
- Chinese-style shigō: Emperor Junnin (淳仁天皇)
- House: Imperial House of Japan
- Father: Prince Toneri
- Mother: Tagima no Yamashiro

Emperor Junnin (淳仁天皇, Junnin-tennō; 733 – November 10, 765) was the 47th emperor of Japan, according to the traditional order of succession. The seventh son of Prince Toneri and a grandson of Emperor Tenmu, his reign spanned the years 758 to 764.

== Traditional narrative ==
Before his ascension to the throne, his name (imina) was Ōi-no-ō. He was the seventh son of Prince Toneri, a son of Emperor Tenmu. And although his father died when he was three, he was not given any rank or office at the court. After the forced abdication he received the newer rank, thus addressed Ōi-shinnō. In the older Japanese documents, he is usually referred to as Haitai (廃帝), the dethroned emperor. The posthumous name of Emperor Junnin was given by Emperor Meiji a thousand years later.

=== Ascension and reign ===
In 757 the Empress Kōken, his third cousin appointed him to be her crown prince instead of Prince Funado, who had been appointed to this position in the will of the Emperor Shōmu. In the tenth year of Kōken-tennō's reign (称徳天皇十年), on December 7, 758 (Tenpyō-shōhō 2, 1st day of the 8th month), the empress abdicated and the succession (senso) passed to her adopted son. Shortly afterwards, Emperor Junnin is said to have ascended to the throne (sokui). In 760 (Tenpyō-hōji 4), additional coins were put into circulation—copper coins bearing the words Mannen Ten-hō, silver coins bearing the words Teihei Genhō, and gold coins bearing the words Kaiki Shōhō.

The years of Junnin's reign, 758–765, are more specifically encompassed within a single era name or nengō,Tenpyō-hōji. Junnin seemingly had very little power and was possibly a mere figurehead. In 764, six years after Empress Kōken had abdicated, the former empress reclaimed the throne during Fujiwara no Nakamaro's Rebellion, forcing Junnin to abdicate.

=== Death and mausoleum ===
On November 10, 765 (Tenpyō-jingo 1, 23rd day of the 10th month), the former emperor died while in exile. The official cause of death was illness, but according to one theory, it was the assassination by the order of Empress Shōtoku. The site of Junnin's actual grave is unknown, and he is traditionally venerated at a memorial Shinto shrine (misasagi) at Awaji. The Imperial Household Agency designates this location as Junnin's mausoleum: It is formally named Awaji no misasagi.

Though Junnin had, technically, been emperor, he was not featured on the official List of Japanese Emperors until the late nineteenth century. In 1870, Emperor Meiji conferred the posthumous name and title by which Emperor Junnin is now known. His place in the traditional order of succession was confirmed at the same time as announcements about Emperor Kōbun and Emperor Chūkyō were made public.

== Kugyō ==
Kugyō (公卿) is a collective term for the few most powerful men attached to the court of the Emperor of Japan in pre-Meiji eras. In general, this elite group included only three or four men at a time, and they were hereditary courtiers whose experience and background would have brought them to the pinnacle of their careers. During Junnin's reign, the ranks of this group of Daijō-kan included:

- Taishi (Daijō-daijin): Fujiwara Oshikatsu, also known as Emi no Oshikatsu (恵美押勝) (formerly Fujiwara no Nakamaro) (藤原仲麻呂).
- Taiho (Udaijin): Fujiwara Oshikatsu.
- Sadaijin:, Fujiwara no Toyonari (藤原豊成).
- Udaijin, Fujiwara no Toyonari (藤原豊成).
- Naidaijin (not appointed)
- Dainagon

== Consorts and children ==
Consort: Awata no Morone (粟田諸姉), widow of Fujiwara no Mayori, the first son of Fujiwara no Nakamaro

By Unknown woman:

- Daughter: Imperial Princess Abe (安倍内親王) married Prince Isobe

== Ancestry ==
Ancestors of Emperor Junnin

8. Emperor Jomei (593–641)
4. Emperor Tenmu (c. 631–686)
9. Empress Kōgyoku/Empress Saimei (594–661)
2. Prince Toneri
10.Emperor Tenji (626–672)
5. Princess Niitabe (d. 699)
11. Abe no Tachibana-no-iratsume (d. 681)
1. Emperor Junnin
6. Tagima no Rō
3. Tagima no Yamashiro

== Notes ==
Japanese Imperial kamon — a stylized chrysanthemum blossom

== See also ==
- Emperor of Japan
- List of Emperors of Japan
- Imperial cult
- Japanese empresses

Regnal titles
Preceded by Empress Kōken	Emperor of Japan Junnin; 758–764	Succeeded by Empress Shōtoku
