= Ritsuryō =

Historical law system in Japan

Premodern Japan
- Part of a series on the politics and government of Japan during the Nara and Heian periods

Daijō-kan (Council of State)
- Chancellor / Chief minister: Daijō-daijin
- Minister of the Left: Sadaijin
- Minister of the Right: Udaijin
- Minister of the Center: Naidaijin
- Major Counselor: Dainagon
- Middle Counselor: Chūnagon
- Minor Counselor: Shōnagon

Eight Ministries
- Center: Nakatsukasa-shō
- Ceremonial: Shikibu-shō
- Civil Administration: Jibu-shō
- Popular Affairs: Minbu-shō
- War: Hyōbu-shō
- Justice: Gyōbu-shō
- Treasury: Ōkura-shō
- Imperial Household: Kunai-shō

Ritsuryō (律令; Japanese: [ɾi.tsɯ.ɾʲoː, ɾi.tsɯ.ɾei, ɾi.tsɯ.ɾeː]) is the historical legal system based on the philosophies of Confucianism and Chinese Legalism in Feudal Japan. The political system in accord to Ritsuryō is called "Ritsuryō-sei" (律令制). Kyaku (格) are amendments of Ritsuryō, Shiki (式) are enactments.

Ritsuryō defines both a criminal code (律, Ritsu) and an administrative code (令, Ryō).

During the late Asuka period (late 6th century – 710) and Nara period (710–794), the Imperial Court, trying to replicate China's rigorous political system from the Tang dynasty, created and enforced some collections of Ritsuryō. Over the course of centuries, the ritsuryō state produced more and more information which was carefully archived; however, with the passage of time in the Heian period, ritsuryō institutions evolved into a political and cultural system without feedback.

In 645, the Taika reforms were the first signs of implementation of the system.

Major re-statements of Ritsuryō included the following:

- Ōmi-ryō (近江令, 669) – 22 volumes of administrative code, of disputed existence
- Asuka-kiyomihara-ryō (飛鳥浄御原令, 689) – 22 volumes of administrative code
- Taihō-ritsuryō (大宝律令, 701) – of major influence, 11 volumes of administrative code, 6 volumes of criminal code
- Yōrō-ritsuryō (養老律令, 720, enacted in 757) – 10 volumes of administrative code, 10 volumes of criminal code, revised edition of the Taihō-ritsuryō

== Main achievements ==
=== Government and administration ===
In the later half of the seventh century, the Kokugunri system (国郡里制, kokugunri-sei) was introduced, dividing the regions of Japan into several administrative divisions.

- Provinces (国, kuni; composed of numerous districts)
- Districts (郡, gun, kōri; composed of 2–20 neighbourhoods)
- Neighbourhoods (里, ri, sato; composed of 50 homes)

In 715 CE, the Gōri system (郷里制, gōri-sei) was introduced, resulting in the following.

- Provinces (国, kuni; composed of numerous districts)
- Districts (郡, gun, kōri; composed of 2–20 townships)
- Townships (郷, gō; composed of 50 homes total, and further divided into two or three neighbourhoods)
- Neighbourhoods (里, ri, sato; usu. composed of approx. 10–25 homes)

This system was abandoned in 740 CE.

=== Centralization of authority ===
The ritsuryō system also established a central administrative government, with the emperor at its head. Two departments were set up:

- The Jingi-kan (神祇官, Department of Worship), in charge of rituals and clergy
- The Daijō-kan (太政官, Department of State), divided into eight ministries.

Posts of those public Departments were all divided into four ranks (shitō): kami (長官), suke (次官), jō (判官) and sakan (主典). This ubiquitous pattern would be replicated consistently, even amongst members of the court whose functions had little to do with those kinds of powers and responsibilities which are conventionally associated with governing. For example:

Court musicians

- Chief court musician (雅楽頭, Uta no kami).
- First assistant court musician (雅楽助, Uta no suke).
- Second assistant court musician (雅楽允, Uta no jō).
- Alternate assistant court musicians (雅楽属, Uta no sakan).

Court apothecaries

- Chief court apothecary (典薬頭, Ten'yaku no kami).
- First assistant to the chief apothecary (典薬助, Ten'yaku no suke).
- Second assistant to the chief apothecary (典薬允, Ten'yaku no jō).
- Alternate assistant to the chief apothecary (典薬属, Ten'yaku no sakan).

=== Establishment of court rank ===
| Rank | | Ikai | |
|---|---|---|---|
| 1 | 一位 first | 正一位 | shō ichi-i |
| 2 | 一位 first | 従一位 | ju ichi-i |
| 3 | 二位 second | 正二位 | shō ni-i |
| 4 | 二位 second | 従二位 | ju ni-i |
| 5 | 三位 third | 正三位 | shō san-mi |
| 6 | 三位 third | 従三位 | ju san-mi |
| 7 | 四位; 4th | 正四位上 | shō shi-i no jō |
| 8 | 四位; 4th | 正四位下 | shō shi-i no ge |
| 9 | 四位; 4th | 従四位上 | ju shi-i no jō |
| 10 | 四位; 4th | 従四位下 | ju shi-i no ge |
| 11 | 五位; 5th | 正五位上 | shō go-i no jō |
| 12 | 五位; 5th | 正五位下 | shō go-i no ge |
| 13 | 五位; 5th | 従五位上 | ju go-i no jō |
| 14 | 五位; 5th | 従五位下 | ju go-i no ge |
| 15 | 六位; 6th | 正六位上 | shō roku-i no jō |
| 16 | 六位; 6th | 正六位下 | shō roku-i no ge |
| 17 | 六位; 6th | 従六位上 | ju roku-i no jō |
| 18 | 六位; 6th | 従六位下 | ju roku-i no ge |
| 19 | 七位; 7th | 正七位上 | shō shichi-i no jō |
| 20 | 七位; 7th | 正七位下 | shō shichi-i no ge |
| 21 | 七位; 7th | 従七位上 | ju shichi-i no jō |
| 22 | 七位; 7th | 従七位下 | ju shichi-i no ge |
| 23 | 八位; 8th | 正八位上 | shō hachi-i no jō |
| 24 | 八位; 8th | 正八位下 | shō hachi-i no ge |
| 25 | 八位; 8th | 従八位上 | ju hachi-i no jō |
| 26 | 八位; 8th | 従八位下 | ju hachi-i no ge |
| 27 | 初位 initial | 大初位上 | dai so-i no jō |
| 28 | 初位 initial | 大初位下 | dai so-i no ge |
| 29 | 初位 initial | 少初位上 | shō so-i no jō |
| 30 | 初位 initial | 少初位下 | shō so-i no ge |

A global system of ranking for all public posts (官 kan, 官職 kanshoku) was introduced with over 30 ranks (位 i, 位階 ikai), regulating strictly which posts could be accessed by which rank. Ranking was supposed to be mostly merit-based, the children of high-ranking public officials were nonetheless granted a minimal rank. This provision (蔭位の制 on'i no sei) existed in the Tang law, however under the Japanese ritsuryo ranks for which it was applied were higher as well as the ranks obtained by the children.

The highest rank in the system was the first rank (一位 ichi-i), proceeding downwards to the eighth rank (八位 hachi-i), held by menials in the court. Below this, an initial rank called so-i (初位) existed, but offered few rights. The top six ranks were considered true aristocracy (貴 ki), and were subdivided into "senior" (正 shō) and "junior" (従 ju) ranks (e.g. senior third-rank [正三位 shō san-mi], junior second-rank [従二位 ju ni-i]). Below the third rank, a further subdivision between "upper" (上 jō) and "lower" (下 ge) existed, allowing for ranks such as “junior fourth rank lower” (従四位下 ju shi-i no ge) or “senior sixth rank upper” (正六位上 shō roku-i no jō). Promotion in ranks was often a very gradual, bureaucratic process, and in the early days of the Codes, one could not advance beyond sixth rank except by rare exception, thus causing a natural cut-off point between the aristocrats (fifth-rank and above [貴族 kizoku]) and the menials (sixth-rank and below [地下 jige]).

Additionally, income in the form of koku (石, 1 koku = about 150 kilograms), or bushels of rice from the provinces, increased dramatically as one advanced in rank. The average sixth-rank official might earn 22 koku of rice a year, but the fifth rank might earn 225 koku of rice, while a third rank official could earn as much as 6,957 a year.

Registration of the citizens (戸籍 koseki), updated every 6 years, and a yearly tax book (計帳 keichō) were established. Based on the keichō, a tax system was established called (租庸調 So-yō-chō). Tax was levied on rice crops but also on several local products (e.g. cotton, salt, tissue) sent to the capital.

The system also established local corvée at a provincial level by orders of the kokushi (国司), a corvée at the Capital (although the corvée at the capital could be replaced by goods sent) and military service.

=== Criminal code ===
A criminal system was introduced, with five levels of punishment (五刑, gokei).

- Caning (笞, chi): Depending on the severity of the crime, 10, 20, 30, 40 or 50 strikes on the buttocks.
- Public caning (杖, jō): Depending on the severity of the crime, 60, 70, 80, 90 or 100 strikes on the buttocks, performed in public, using a slightly thicker cane than was used for chi.
- Imprisonment (徒, zu): Depending on the severity of the crime, imprisonment for 1, 1.5, 2, 2.5 or 3 years.
- Exile (流, ru) Depending on the severity of the crime, nearby exile (近流, konru), semi-distant exile (中流, chūru), or distant exile (遠流, onru).
- Death (死, shi): Depending on the severity of the crime, death by hanging (絞, kō) or decapitation (斬, zan).

It defined eight heavy crimes (八虐, hachigyaku) that were exempt from amnesty which included the following list of unpardonable crimes:

- Regicide (謀反, Muhen): assassinating the Emperor (including attempted assassination and preparation).
- Treason (謀大逆, Bōtaigyaku): usurpation or attempted dethronement of the emperor by plotting to destroy the palace or tomb of a sovereign.
- Rebellion (謀叛, Muhon): Inciting rebellion against the state, inciting foreign aggression, or seeking asylum in a foreign country
- Evil (不道, Fudō): Crimes against superior relatives that involve a high degree of intimacy and serious harm, such as the execution, plotting, or assault and injury of grandparents or parents, or a wife killing her husband or his parents.
- Unjust (悪逆, Akugyaku): Antisocial and abnormal crimes such as mass murder and curses. Crimes against superior relatives that are less intimate than tyranny or that cause less serious harm. Assault or injury against an uncle or older brother.
- Great Disrespect (大不敬, Daifukei): The crime of behaving disrespectfully towards shrines or the Emperor as well as speaking ill of the emperor or the state
- Unfilial piety (不孝, Fukyō): ungrateful acts toward grandparents and parents. Such actions include filing charges, speaking ill of others, not providing support, not mourning, etc.
- Iniquity (不義, Fugi): Murder of a superior such as a master, boss, teacher, etc. The crime of a wife not mourning her husband.

The code was based on the Ten Abominations of the Tang code, but two crimes related to family life—family discord and disruption of the family (through incest, adultery, etc.) —were removed.

=== Handen-Shūju ===
In accordance with Chinese legal codes, land as well as citizens were to be "public property" (公地公民). One of the major pillars of the Ritsuryō was the introduction of the Handen-Shūju (班田収受制) system, similar to the equal-field system in China. The Handen-Shūju regulated land ownership. Based on the registration, each citizen over 6 was entitled to a "distributed field" (口分田, kubunden), subject to taxation (approx. 3% of crops). The area of each field was 2 tan (段) for men (approx. 22 ares total), and two-thirds of this amount for women. (However, the Shinuhi and Kenin castes were only entitled to 1/3 of this area). The field was returned to the country at death. Land belonging to shrines and temples was exempt from taxation. Collection and redistribution of land took place every 6 years.

=== Castes ===
The population was divided in two castes, Ryōmin (良民) (furthermore divided into 4 sub-castes) and Senmin (賤民) (divided into 5 sub-castes), the latter being close to slaves. Citizens wore different colors according to their caste.

== Evolution of Ritsuryō application ==
Several modifications were added over time. In order to promote cultivation, a law allowing the ownership for three generations of newly arable fields was promulgated in 723 (三世一身の法, Sanze-isshin Law) and then without limits in 743 (墾田永年私財法, Konden Einen Shizai Law). This led to the appearance of large private lands, the first shōens.

Strict application of the Handen-Shūju system decayed in the 8th and 9th century. In an attempt to maintain the system, the period between each collection/distribution was extended to 12 years under Emperor Kanmu. At the beginning of Heian period, the system was almost not enforced. The last collection/distribution took place between 902 and 903.

The caste system was less and less strictly enforced. Some Ryōmin would wed Senmin to avoid taxation, and Senmin/Ryōmin children would become Ryōmin. At the end of the 9th century / beginning of the 10th, the caste system was practically void of its substance.

Hereditary high-ranks for public posts led to the monopoly of occupation of the most important posts by a limited number of families, in effect a nobility, amongst which the Fujiwara clan, Minamoto clan, Taira clan and the Tachibana clan.

== In popular culture ==
The ritsuryō system is represented as a form of government in Crusader Kings III, following the release of the All Under Heaven expansion in October 2025. The game depicts Ritsuryō as a centralized administrative government in Heian-period Japan, in which governors are appointed to administer territories and aristocratic families compete for political influence and the position of kampaku (imperial regent). Players can also establish hereditary fiefs under the alternative sōryō government, reflecting the historical shift from court-centered administration toward the rule of provincial military families.

== See also ==
- Law of Japan § Historical developments
- Ōmi Code
- Asuka Kiyomihara Code
- Taihō Code
- Yōrō Code
- Station bell
- Fengjian
