= Station bell =

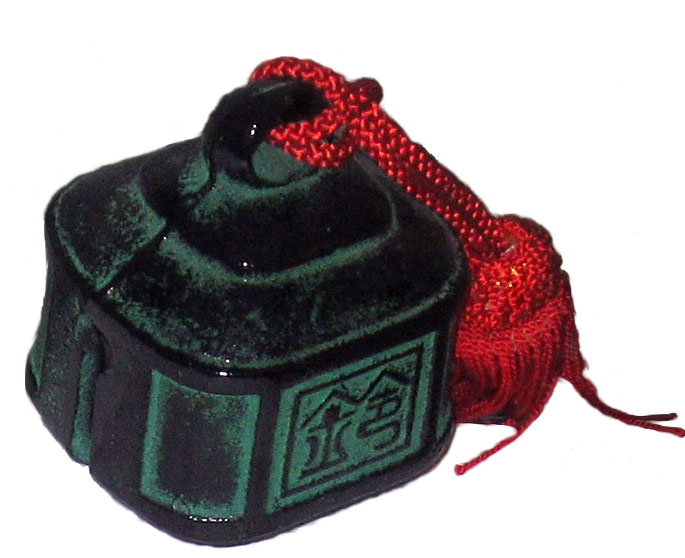
A station bell

Under the Japanese ritsuryō system, station bells or post bells (駅鈴, ekirei) were bells of red copper issued by the central government or by local provincial government offices to travelling officials or messengers known as ekishi (駅使). Functioning as a proof of identity, they allowed them to procure horses and labour at post stations. These post stations were located every 30 ri (16 kilometers) each providing between five and twenty messenger horses depending on the grade of the road. Depending on the rank of the emissary, the bells were marked with a number of notches regulating the number of horses that could be requested. A prince of royal blood of first rank would receive ten horses. On urgent dispatches the ekishi would ride with the bells ringing in order to be able to change horses at any time of day or night without delay. These bells were also known as post road bells (ekiru no suzu) or stable bells (umaya no suzu). The system was established in the Taihō Code from 701 and was in use until the end of the 12th century or the end of the Heian period when it fell in disuse together with the demise of the centralized state.

A set of two station bells located on Dōgo island in Okinoshima, Shimane Prefecture and known as Ekirei of Oki Province (隠岐国駅鈴, oki no kuni ekirei) has been designated as Important Cultural Property of Japan. Attached to the nomination is a six-legged Chinese style chest bestowed by Emperor Kōkaku. The bells have been handed down in the Oki family whose members were associated with the Tamawakasu no Mikoto Shrine (玉若酢命神社, tamawakasu no mikoto jinja) and the regional administrators of Oki Province. They are currently located in the Oki family treasure hall (億岐家宝物館, Oki-ke Hōmotsu-kan) in Okinoshima. The two bells are of flat octagonal shape and made of cast copper. On one side of the trunk the character "驛" (station) is carved, and on the opposite side, the character "鈴" (bell). At the bottom of the bells three and four legs are attached respectively. They weigh in at 700 g (25 oz) and 770 g (27 oz) respectively. Before World War II, the bells had been designated as National Treasure of Japan on April 30, 1935, but lost this status in the reorganisation of cultural property protection after the war when all previously designated National Treasures were demoted to Important Cultural Properties in 1950.

== See also ==
- Gokishichidō
- Hikyaku (Couriers under bakufu governments who replaced the ekishi.)
