= Fujiwara no Nakamaro =

Japanese noble

Fujiwara no Nakamaro (藤原 仲麻呂; 706 – October 21, 764), also known as Emi no Oshikatsu (恵美 押勝), was a Japanese aristocrat (kuge), courtier, and statesman. He was chancellor (Daijō-daijin) of the Imperial government during the Nara period.

== Early life ==
Nakamaro was the second son of Fujiwara no Muchimaro, who was the founder of Nan-ke (southern branch) of the Fujiwara clan.

== Career ==
Nakamaro was named to progressively important court positions during the reign of Empress Kōken.

- Minister of the Right (udaijin)
- Supreme Military Official (shibinaishō)
- Vice Minister (jundaijin)

Opposition led by Tachibana no Naramaro and others was put down in 757.

In 758, Nakamaro was given the title and role of "Grand Guardian" (taihō); and his name was changed to Emi No Oshikatsu. The power to mint copper coins was granted to Oshikatsu in 759.

Nakamaro became Prime Minister (taishi) during the reign of Emperor Junnin. He acted to secure the northern border with the Ainu, but his plans did not succeed.

Plans for a military campaign in Korea were started, but it was abandoned.

His plans were opposed by some of his cousins in the Fujiwara clan.

=== Rebellion ===
In 764, Nakamaro was a trusted supporter of the emperor Junnin; and he was at odds with former-Empress Kōken and her close associate, the monk Dōkyō. In the struggle between the factions headed by Junnin and Kōken, Nakamaro was captured and killed. His wife and children were also killed. Soon after, Junnin was deposed; and Kōken reclaimed the monarch's role for another five years.

== See also ==
- Tōshi Kaden, a bibliographic clan record
