= Fujiwara no Fuyutsugu =

8th-century Japanese nobleman

Fujiwara no Fuyutsugu 藤原冬嗣
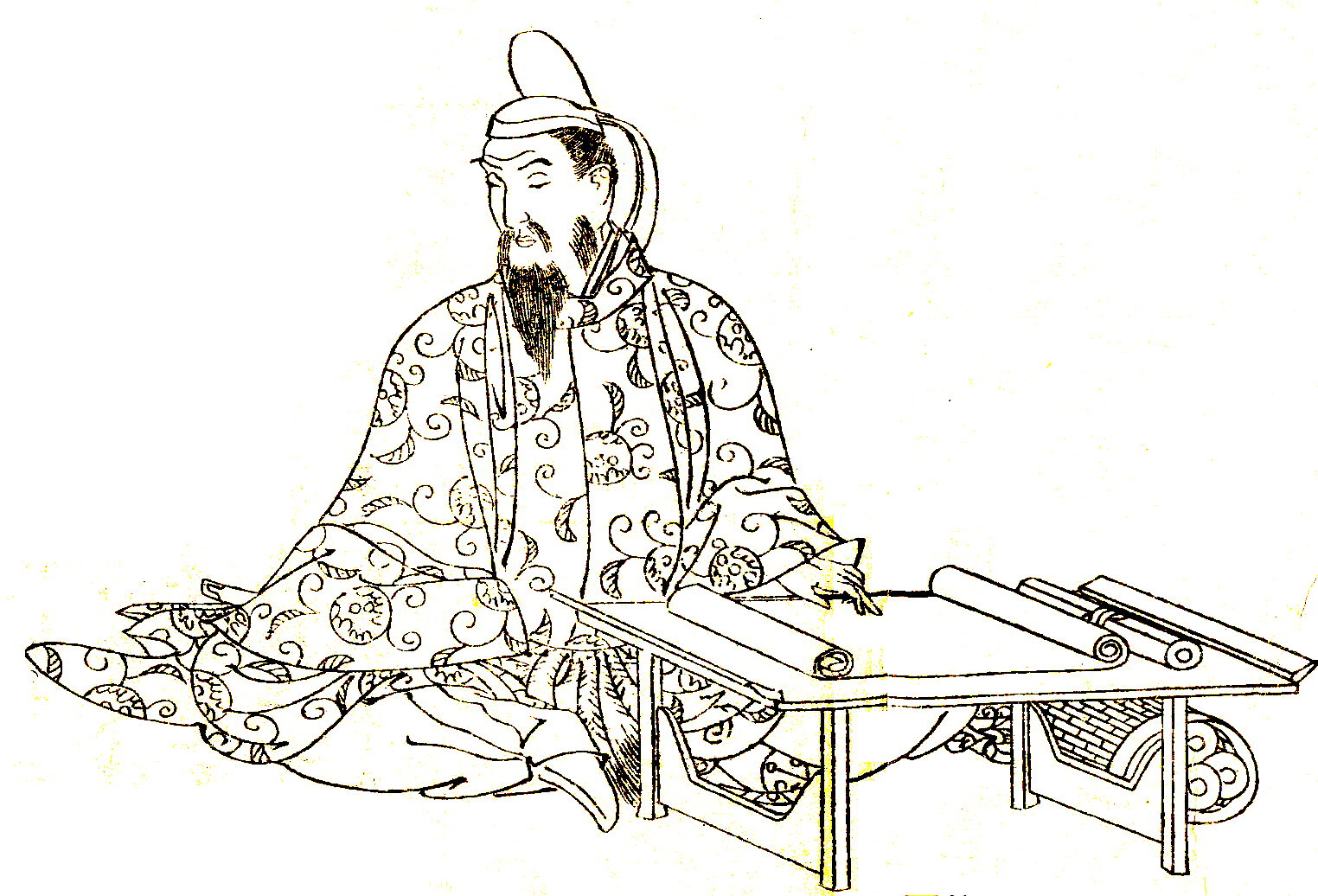
- Illustration by Kikuchi Yōsai, from "Zenken-Kojitsu"
- Born: 775
- Died: August 30, 826
- Family: Fujiwara Hokke
- Father: Fujiwara no Uchimaro

Fujiwara no Fuyutsugu (藤原冬嗣; 775 – August 30, 826) was a Japanese noble, statesman, general, and poet of the early Heian period. A member of the Hokke, he was the second son of the udaijin Fujiwara no Uchimaro. He attained the court rank of shō ni-i (正二位) and the position of sadaijin, and posthumously of shō ichi-i (正一位) and daijō-daijin. He was also known as Kan'in-Daijin (閑院大臣).

== Life ==
In the court of Emperor Kanmu, Fuyutsugu held posts as chief judge and then as a captain in the imperial guard. Upon Emperor Heizei's ascension in 806, Fuyutsugu was promoted to ju go-i no ge (従五位下) and senior official of the Crown Prince's Quarters (春宮大進, tōgū-daishin). The next year, he was promoted to assistant master in the Crown Prince's Quarters (春宮亮, tōgū no suke). Even while so supporting Crown Prince Kamino, he also held a position as chamberlain, and as ushōben (右少弁) in the daijō-kan.

In 809, Emperor Saga assumed the throne, and Fuyutsugu was promoted at a stroke to ju shi-i no ge (従四位下) and division chief (督) in the Imperial Guard. As a close aide of the emperor since his days as crown prince, Fuyutsugu had Saga's deep trust, and when the kuroudo-dokoro (蔵人所) was created as a new secretarial organ for the emperor in response to the Kusuko Incident, Fuyutsugu was made its first head, along with Kose no Notari. In 811 he was promoted to sangi, thus joining the kugyō. He continued to be promoted quickly under Emperor Saga, including to ju san-mi (従三位) in 814 and chūnagon in 816. In 819, he was appointed dainagon, making him the head of the cabinet. With this Fuyutsugu finally surpassed Fujiwara no Otsugu of the Shikike, one year his senior, who had found great success under Emperor Kanmu and made sangi ten years before Fuyutsugu did. In 821, Fuyutsugu was promoted to udaijin.

In the court of Saga's successor Emperor Junna, Kanmu's son, Otsugu was promoted to udaijin in 825, pushing Fuyutsugu to sadaijin. Fuyutsugu died on August 30, 826, at the age of 52, with the ranks of shō ni-i (正二位), sadaijin, and general of the imperial guard. Immediately after his death, he was granted the posthumous rank of shō ichi-i (正一位). When his grandson Emperor Montoku ascended to the throne in 850, he granted Fuyutsugu the additional posthumous rank of daijō-daijin.

== Personality ==
According to the Nihon Kōki, Fuyutsugu was talented and magnanimous, gentle and calm. Able in both literary and military arts, he had a flexible viewpoint, and his generous attitude with others brought him favor. He also made charitable donations to the poor from his wages.

Aside from his political activities, Fuyutsugu strove to unite the Fujiwara clan with himself as its head. He built kangaku-in (勧学院) as a dormitory for young Fujiwara students, constructed the South Octagonal Hall at Kōfuku-ji, and made a large donation to the free pharmacy built by Empress Kōmyō.

Fuyutsugu contributed to the editing of several works, including the Nihon Kōki. His kanshi poems are included in the Ryōunshū, Bunka Shūreishū, and Keikokushū, and the Gosen Wakashū contains four of his waka.

== Genealogy ==
- Father: Fujiwara no Uchimaro
- Mother: Kudara no Nagatsugu (百済永継), daughter of Asukabe no Natomaro (飛鳥部奈止麻呂)
- Wife: Fujiwara no Mitsuko (藤原美都子), daughter of Fujiwara no Matsukuri (藤原真作)
  - Son: Fujiwara no Nagara (藤原長良; 802–856)
  - Son: Fujiwara no Yoshifusa (藤原良房; 804–872)
  - Son: Fujiwara no Yoshimi (藤原良相; 811–867)
  - Daughter: Fujiwara no Nobuko (藤原順子; 809–871), court lady of Emperor Ninmyō, mother of Emperor Montoku
- Wife: daughter of Kudara no Konikishi no Jintei
  - Son: Fujiwara no Yoshikata (藤原良方)
- Wife: daughter of Abe no Ogasa (安倍男笠)
  - Son: Fujiwara no Yoshisuke (藤原良輔)
  - Son: Fujiwara no Yoshikado (藤原良門), ancestor of the Kajūji branch of the Fujiwara
- Wife: daughter of Shimada Murasaku (嶋田村作)
  - Son: Fujiwara no Yoshihito (藤原良仁; 819–860)
- Wife: daughter of Prince Ōniwa (大庭王)
  - Son: Fujiwara no Yoshiyo (藤原良世; 823–900)
- Wife: unknown
  - Daughter: Fujiwara no Furuko (藤原古子), court lady of Emperor Montoku
