= Fujiwara no Uchimaro =

Fujiwara no Uchimaro 藤原内麻呂
- Born: 756
- Died: November 13, 812
- Family: Fujiwara Hokke
- Father: Fujiwara no Matate

Fujiwara no Uchimaro (藤原内麻呂; 756 – November 13, 812) was a Japanese noble of the Nara period and early Heian period. He was the third son of the dainagon Fujiwara no Matate and thus a member of the Hokke. He reached the court rank of ju ni-i (従二位) and the position of udaijin, and posthumously of ju ichi-i (従一位) and daijō-daijin. He was also known as Go-Nagaoka-Daijin (後長岡大臣).

He served the emperors Kanmu, Heizei, and Saga, and was trusted and valued by each. He succeeded his uncle Nagate and his line as the head of the family. Unlike his father, whose secondary status in the family had prevented him from making daijin, Uchimaro rose to udaijin, and led the cabinet in Heizei's reign and the beginning of Saga's. He had many children, helping to lay the foundation for the later success of the Hokke.

== Life ==
On the ascension of Emperor Kanmu in 781, Uchimaro was promoted from shō roku-i no jō (正六位上) to ju go-i no ge (従五位下). He was consecutively promoted in 785, 786, and 787, culminating in the rank of ju shi-i no ge (従四位下). This came shortly after Uchimaro's first wife, Kudara no Nagatsugu, who had since become a court lady, bore the emperor a prince (Yoshimine no Yasuyo (良岑安世)). It has been theorized that this birth precipitated Uchimaro's rapid promotion, and even that he used Nagatsugu as collateral to deepen his relationship with the Emperor. During this period, he held various positions in the imperial guard and as a provincial governor.

Later, Uchimaro held head directoral positions in a division of the imperial guard, the Ministry of Justice, and the kuraryō (内蔵寮), a body governing the finances of the imperial household. In 794, immediately after the move of the capital to Heian-kyō, Uchimaro joined the kugyō with a promotion to sangi. At the age of 39, this made him the second youngest member of the cabinet after the 34-year-old Fujiwara no Takatoshi (藤原乙叡) of the Nanke. However, in the next few years, four high-ranking cabinet officials, including udaijin Fujiwara no Tsuginawa and dainagon Ki no Kosami, died or retired, and in 798, Uchimaro was promoted to ju san-mi (従三位) and chūnagon. He also obtained various other positions during this period, including general of the imperial guard. In 799 he was put in charge of the continued relocation to the capital. During the dispute between Fujiwara no Otsugu and Sugano no Mamichi (tokusei-ronsō (徳政論争)), in which Otsugu persuaded the Emperor to suspend his campaign in Ezo and the construction of Heian-kyō, Uchimaro waited on Kanmu by his side.

When Emperor Heizei ascended to the throne in 806, Uchimaro was promoted to dainagon. When Prince Miwa (神王) died a month later, Uchimaro took over as head of the cabinet with a promotion to shō san-mi (正三位) and udaijin. In 809, he was promoted to ju ni-i (従二位). He emerged unscathed from the attempted coup of Prince Iyo and the Kusuko Incident.

Uchimaro died on November 13, 812, at the age of 57. He was posthumously promoted to ju ichi-i (従一位) and sadaijin, and days later again to daijō-daijin.

== Personality ==
According to the Nihon Kōki, Uchimaro was mild-mannered and very popular, and people were happy to follow him. The emperors he served trusted him deeply, and while he did not flatter them, he did not remonstrate them when they disagreed. He served in important government positions for more than ten years without committing any blunders. He was noted to have an exceptionally ready wit.

Uchimaro commissioned statues of the Four Heavenly Kings and a version of Kannon and let his son Fuyutsugu offer them to Kōfuku-ji.

An anecdote in the Nihon Kōki states that when Prince Osabe was crown prince, he bore ill will toward Uchimaro and tried to injure him. There was a horse with a habit of kicking and biting, and the prince had Uchimaro mount this horse, but the horse kept its head down and did not try to move, and even when they whipped it, it simply turned around once.

== Genealogy ==
- Father: Fujiwara no Matate
- Mother: daughter of Abe no Obimaro (阿倍帯麻呂)
- Wife: Kudara no Nagatsugu (百済永継), daughter of Asukabe no Natomaro (飛鳥部奈止麻呂), later a court lady of Emperor Kanmu
  - Son: Fujiwara no Manatsu (藤原真夏; 774–830)
  - Son: Fujiwara no Fuyutsugu (藤原冬嗣; 775–826)
- Wife: Sakanoue no Nariko (坂上登子), second daughter of Sakanoue no Karitamaro
  - Son: Fujiwara no Sakuramaro (藤原桜麻呂)
  - Son: Fujiwara no Futakimaro (原福当麻呂)
  - Son: Fujiwara no Nagaoka (藤原長岡; 786–849)
  - Son: name unclear (藤原平○○)
  - Daughter: Fujiwara no Esuko (藤原恵須子)
- Wife: daughter of Itō Daishin (依当大神)
  - Son: Fujiwara no Chikanari (藤原愛発; 787–843)
- Wife: daughter of Fujiwara no Nagate
  - Son: Fujiwara no Mamoru (藤原衛; 799–857)
- Wife: (unknown)
  - Son: Fujiwara no Akitsugu (藤原秋継)
  - Son: Fujiwara no Ritsu (藤原率)
  - Son: Fujiwara no Ōtsu (藤原大津; 792–854)
  - Son: Fujiwara no Tasuke (藤原助; 799–853)
  - Son: Fujiwara no Osamu (藤原収)
  - Daughter: Fujiwara no Onatsu (藤原緒夏; ?–855), wife of Emperor Saga
  - Daughter: Wife of Ki no Aritsune (紀有常室)
