= Fujiwara no Moroane =

Japanese noblewoman of the Nara period

- Spouse: Fujiwara no Momokawa
- Issue: Fujiwara no Otsugu; Fujiwara no Tsugunari; Fujiwara no Tabiko; Fujiwara no Tarashiko
- Father: Fujiwara no Yoshitsugu
- Mother: Abe no Komina

Fujiwara no Moroane (藤原 諸姉; d. 786) was a Japanese noblewoman of the Nara period and sister-in-law of Emperor Kanmu.

== Family ==
Moroane was a member of the famous Fujiwara clan. Her father was a nobleman called Fujiwara no Yoshitsugu. Her mother was Abe no Komina.

Her sister was Empress Fujiwara no Otomuro, wife of Emperor Kanmu. Moroane was an aunt of Emperor Heizei and Emperor Saga.

Moroane married courtier Fujiwara no Momokawa. Their children were:

- Fujiwara no Otsugu
- Fujiwara no Tsugunari
- Fujiwara no Tabiko
- Fujiwara no Tarashiko

Her grandson was Emperor Junna.
