= Jōwa Incident =

The Jōwa incident (承和の変, Jōwa no Hen) was a Japanese succession dispute that occurred in 842, during the early Heian period. Fujiwara no Yoshifusa's nephew, the future Emperor Montoku, took over the role of Crown Prince, while the former crown prince Prince Tsunesada and a number of Yoshifusa's rivals were removed from power. It brought an end to thirty years of uneventful successions that the court had enjoyed by the wishes of Emperor Kanmu and the power of Emperor Saga.

== Background ==
In 823, Emperor Saga abdicated the throne, and his younger brother ascended as Emperor Junna. In 833, the throne passed again to Saga's son, Emperor Ninmyō. At this point, Prince Tsunesada, a son of Junna by Saga's daughter Princess Seishi, was made crown prince. Saga guided the government for almost thirty years, avoiding succession disputes in that time.

During this time, Fujiwara no Yoshifusa of the Hokke gained the confidence of the retired Emperor Saga and his chief consort Tachibana no Kachiko and quickly rose to prominence. Yoshifusa's younger sister Junshi (順子) became a wife of Emperor Ninmyō and bore him a son, Prince Michiyasu, the future Emperor Montoku. Yoshifusa wanted this child put on the throne. Tsunesada and his father Junna, uncomfortable with this development, appealed to Saga to allow Tsunesada to leave his position as crown prince, but were refused each time.

== Conspiracy and capture ==
In 840, the retired Emperor Junna died. Two years later, in the summer of 842, Saga too became seriously sick. Sensing danger, Crown Prince Tsunesada's attendant Tomo no Kowamine (伴健岑) and his friend Tachibana no Hayanari, the provisional governor of Tajima Province, expected an attack on the Crown Prince, and planned to take Tsunesada to the eastern provinces. They consulted with Prince Abo, a son of Emperor Heizei, on the matter. Abo did not want to participate, and secretly reported the plot to Tachibana no Kachiko, who was also Hayanari's cousin. Surprised at the seriousness of the situation, Kachiko further consulted on the matter with the chūnagon Yoshifusa himself. Naturally, Yoshifusa reported this to Emperor Ninmyō.

Within weeks of falling sick, Saga died. Two days later, Ninmyō arrested Kowamine, Hayanari, and those viewed as fellow conspirators, and also placed the capital under strict guard. Tsunesada immediately sent a letter of resignation to the Emperor, but it was refused for the moment on the grounds that he was innocent. Within another week, though, the political situation had changed significantly, and major general Fujiwara no Yoshimi, Yoshifusa's younger brother, surrounded the Crown Prince's throne with the imperial guard. The dainagon Fujiwara no Chikanari, chūnagon Fujiwara no Yoshino, and sangi Funya no Akitsu, who had been in attendance, were captured.

Ninmyō released an imperial decree stating that Kowamine and Hayanari and their associates had been plotting a conspiracy, and that although Tsunesada was innocent of any involvement, he would be disinherited as crown prince in order to take responsibility. Chikanari was exiled from the capital, Yoshino was sent to the Dazaifu, and Akitsu to Izumo Province. Kowamine was exiled to Oki Province, and Hayanari to Izu Province, but the latter died along the way. Many other officials who had been serving Tsunesada in roles associated with Crown Prince's affairs, including Harusumi no Yoshitada, were also punished.

== Aftermath ==
After the incident, Fujiwara no Yoshifusa was promoted to dainagon, and his nephew Prince Michiyasu was made Crown Prince.

This incident is commonly held to be the first in which the Fujiwara family set out to crush its rivals. Yoshifusa, in addition to achieving his aim of setting Prince Michiyasu up as crown prince, struck a blow to the powerful Tomo and Tachibana families, and additionally destroyed the standing of his Fujiwara rivals Chikanari and Yoshino. Even so, the most important legacy of the incident was to end the chain of sibling inheritance, from older brother to younger, preserved by Saga and Junna based on the dying wishes of Emperor Kanmu. Instead, it set up a direct line of inheritance from Saga to Ninmyō to Montoku.

In the years after the incident, Yoshifusa extended his power even further, continuing his promotion. He was the first non-member of the Imperial Family to hold the position of sesshō, and simultaneously held the powerful office of Daijō-daijin. In this way, he helped to build the foundation for future Fujiwara power.

== Individuals punished in connection with the incident ==
Person	Position	Punishment
Prince Tsunesada	Crown Prince	Disinherited as crown prince
Prince Hirone (広根王)	shō roku-i no jō (正六位上); director of the Crown Prince's servants (舎人正)	Demoted to provisional governor of Iki Province
Fujiwara no Chikanari	shō san-mi (正三位); Dainagon	Removed from office and exiled from the capital
Fujiwara no Sadamori (藤原貞守)	ju go-i no ge (従五位下); assistant director of the Crown Prince's Quarters (春宮坊亮)	Demoted to provisional governor of Echigo Province
Fujiwara no Yoshino	shō san-mi (正三位); chūnagon	Demoted to director of the Dazaifu
Fujiwara no Chikanushi (藤原近主)	ju go-i no ge (従五位下); first inspector in the Crown Prince's Quarters (春宮坊大進)	Demoted to provisional vice-governor of Hōki Province
Fujiwara no Masayo (藤原正世)	ju go-i no ge (従五位下); second inspector in the Ministry of Justice (刑部少輔)	Demoted to provisional vice-governor of Aki Province
Fujiwara no Sadaniwa (藤原貞庭)	shō roku-i no jō (正六位上); second inspector in the Crown Prince's Quarters (春宮坊少進)	Demoted to provisional inspector of Sado Province
Fujiwara no Masamine (藤原正岑)	shō shichi-i no jō (正七位上); second inspector in the Ministry of War (兵部少丞)	Demoted to provisional inspector of Inaba Province
Fujiwara no Akitsune (藤原秋常)	ju go-i no ge (従五位下); shōnagon	Demoted to provisional governor of Iwami Province
Fujiwara no Minehito (藤原岑人)	shō roku-i no jō (正六位上); first inspector in the Ministry of Popular Affairs (民部大丞)	Demoted to provisional inspector of Etchū Province
Fujiwara no Takanao (藤原高直)	ju go-i no ge (従五位下); first inspector in the Crown Prince's Quarters (春宮坊大進)	Demoted to provisional vice-governor of Suruga Province
Fujiwara no Awazukuri (藤原粟作)	shō roku-i no jō (正六位上); inspector in the Kageyushi-chō (勘解由判官)	Demoted to provisional inspector of Hyūga Province
Fujiwara no Yasunari (藤原安成)	shō hachi-i no jō (正八位上); second inspector in the Ministry of Ceremonies (治部少丞)	Demoted to provisional inspector of Tango Province
Tomo no Kowamine (伴健岑)	Armed guard of the Crown Prine (春宮坊帯刀舎人)	Exiled to Oki Province
Tachibana no Hayanari	ju go-i no ge (従五位下); provisional governor of Tajima Province	Family name removed from mentions of him in official records; exiled to Izu Province. Died en route.
Tachibana no Manao (橘真直)	ju go-i no ge (従五位下); assistant governor of Higo Province	Demoted to provisional vice-governor of Chikugo Province
Tachibana no Sueshige (橘末茂)	shō roku-i no jō (正六位上); second inspector of eastern Heian-kyō (左京少進)	Demoted to provisional governor of Hida Province
Tachibana no Kiyokage (橘清蔭)	shō roku-i no jō (正六位上); vice-director of the Palace Office (主殿助)	Demoted to provisional vice-governor of Kaga Province
Funya no Akitsu	shō shi-i no ge (正四位下); sangi	Demoted to extra governor of Izumo Province
Ki no Naganao (紀永直)	shō roku-i no jō (正六位上); second inspector in the Ministry of Popular Affairs (民部少丞)	Demoted to provisional inspector of Iyo Province
Ki no Sadatsugu (紀貞嗣)	shō roku-i no jō (正六位上); first inspector of eastern Heian-kyō (左京大進)	Demoted to provisional inspector of Kazusa Province, then Owari Province
Ki no Harutsune (紀春常)	shō shichi-i no jō (正七位上); ministerial equerry (内舎人)	Demoted to provisional inspector of Shimotsuke Province
Sakanoue no Aratsugu (坂上新継)	shō roku-i no ge (正六位下); Crown Prince's horsemaster (主馬首)	Demoted to provisional inspector of Noto Province
Sakanoue no Masamine (坂上当岑)	shō shichi-i no jō (正七位上); Crown Prince's treasurer (主蔵正)	Demoted to provisional inspector of Bungo Province
Tajihi no Tadatari (丹墀縄足)	shō roku-i no jō (正六位上); Crown Prince's caterer (主膳正)	Demoted to provisional inspector of Satsuma Province
Tajihi no Tokinaga (丹墀時永)	shō shichi-i no jō (正七位上); Shō-hanji (少判事)	Demoted to provisional inspector of Bunzen Province
Yoshimichi no Sanesada (善道真貞)	ju shi-i no ge (従四位下); Crown Prince's tutor (東宮坊学士)	Demoted to provisional governor of Bingo Province
Harusumi no Yoshitada	ju go-i no ge (従五位下);Crown Prince's tutor (東宮坊学士)	Demoted to provisional governor of Suō Province
Yamaguchi no Inayuka (山口稲床)	shō roku-i no jō (正六位上); first secretary of the Crown Prince's Quarters (春宮坊大属)	Demoted to provisional secretary of Awa Province
Shigehara no Michinari (滋原道成)	shō roku-i no jō (正六位上); second secretary of the Crown Prince's Quarters (春宮坊少属)	Demoted to provisional second secretary of Hizen Province
Kamitsukenu no Sadatsugu (上毛野貞継)	shō roku-i no jō (正六位上); Crown Prince's carpenter (主工首)	Demoted to provisional governor of Tsushima Province, then provisional inspector of Tosa Province
Awaumi no Toyomori (淡海豊守)	shō roku-i no ge (正六位下); Crown Prince's palace master (主殿首)	Demoted to provisional inspector of Ōsumi Province
Asano no Kiyō (朝野清雄)	shō roku-i no ge (正六位下); second secretary of the Crown Prince's Quarters (春宮坊少属)	Demoted to provisional secretary of Tango Province
