= Emperor Junna =

Emperor of Japan from 823 to 833

Emperor Junna 淳和天皇
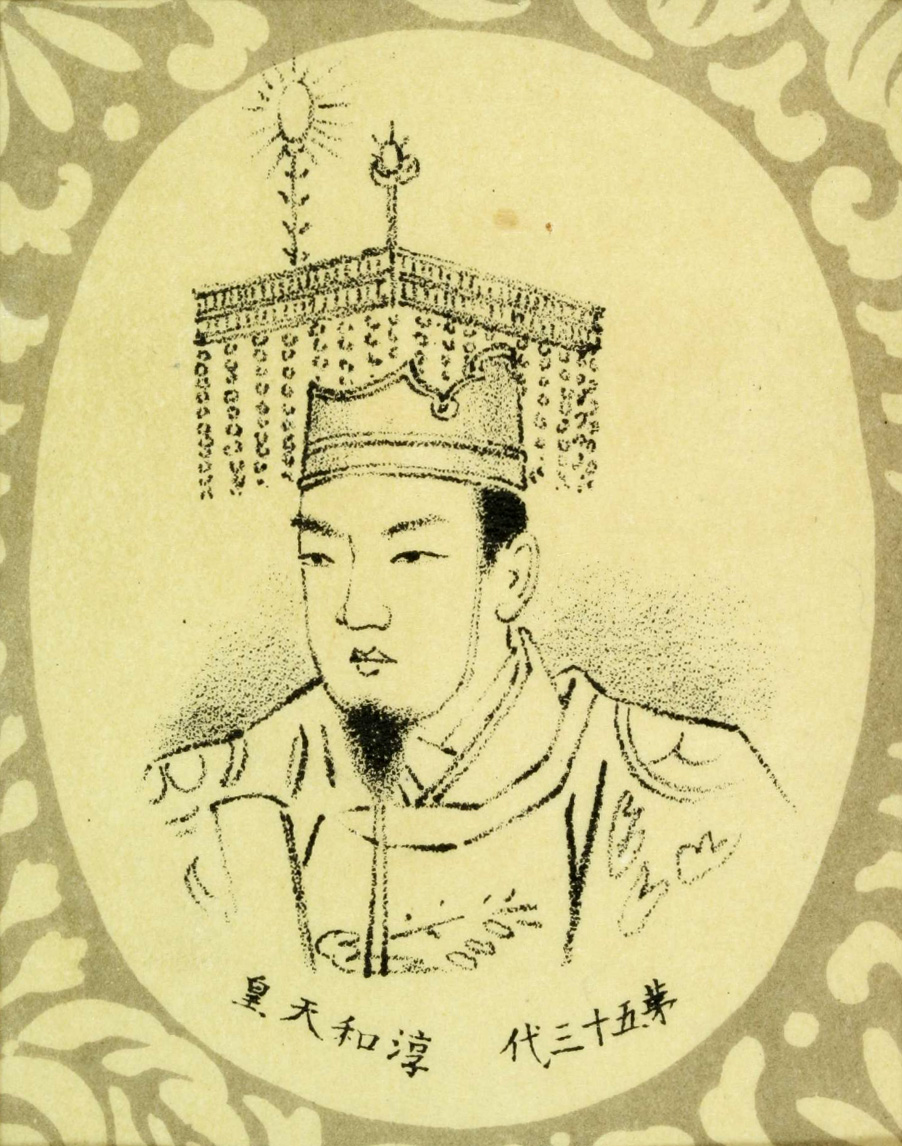

Emperor of Japan
- Reign: 29 May 823 – 22 March 833
- Enthronement: 30 May 823
- Predecessor: Saga
- Successor: Ninmyō
- Born: Ōtomo (大伴) c. 786
- Died: 11 June 840 (aged 54–55); Heian Kyō (Kyōto) Junna-in temple (淳和院)
- Burial: Ōharano no nishi no minenoe no misasagi (大原野西嶺上陵) (Kyoto)
- Spouse: Shoshi/Masako
- Issue more...: Prince Tsunesada
Posthumous name
- Tsuigō: Emperor Junna (淳和天皇) Japanese-style shigō: Yamato-neko-ame-no-takazuruiyatoo no Mikoto (日本根子天高譲弥遠尊)
- House: Imperial House of Japan
- Father: Emperor Kanmu
- Mother: Fujiwara no Tabiko

Emperor Junna (淳和天皇, Junna-tennō; c. 786 – 11 June 840) was the 53rd emperor of Japan, according to the traditional order of succession. Junna reigned from 823 to 833. He is also known as Emperor Saiin.

== Biography ==
Emperor Junna was the seventh son of Emperor Kanmu. His mother was Tabiko, the daughter of Fujiwara no Momokawa. He was the half-brother of Emperor Heizei and Emperor Saga. His birth mother died when he was age two, and Emperor Kanmu had Hirata no Magoō, the wife of the capable courtier Fumuro no Yoki, raise him as a surrogate mother. Per the Nihon Kōki, in 798, he underwent his coming-of-age ceremony in the palace.

In 810, following the failed attempt by the retired Emperor Heizei to return to power, Prince Takaoka, son of Emperor Heizei, was deposed as Crown Prince. In his place, Junna was appointed Crown Prince as the younger brother of Emperor Saga. While Emperor Heizei and Emperor Saga were sons of Emperor Kanmu's Empress (Fujiwara no Otomuro), Prince Ōtomo (Emperor Junna) was not born to the Empress, but his mother, Tabiko, was from the same Fujiwara Shiki-ke family as the Empress. Furthermore, Prince Ōtomo had married Princess Takashi, the Empress's half-sister, and fathered Prince Tsuneyo. In this respect, Prince Tsuneyo was closer to the direct line of Emperor Kanmu than either Prince Takaoka or Prince Masayoshi (later Emperor Ninmyō), the son of Emperor Saga. In addition to this, it is believed that Prince Ōtomo became Crown Prince due to his good relationship with Emperor Saga. On the other hand, Prince Ōtomo himself was not enthusiastic about succeeding to the throne, fearing that he and Prince Tsuneyo would be drawn into a succession dispute like Prince Otobe and Prince Sawara. Some researchers believe that his petition to be demoted to commoner status in 795 AD was a manifestation of this attitude.

On April 16, 823 (May 29, 823), he ascended the throne after Emperor Saga abdicated. The details of the enthronement ceremony are recorded in the "Record of Emperor Junna's Enthronement." Furthermore, upon Emperor Junna's enthronement, the Ōtomo clan changed their surname to Tomo to avoid using the emperor's given name.

Although many details of his reign remain unclear due to the loss of the "Nihon Kōki," he actively appointed competent officials such as Kiyohara no Natsuno and attempted to rectify the political decay in the provinces. He also implemented land policies and strived to increase tax revenue. He also oversaw the compilation of the "Ryōgige" and the "Nihon Kōki."

On March 22, 833, he abdicated in favor of Emperor Ninmyō, becoming a retired emperor and moving to Junna-in, a villa located in Ukyo-ku, Kyoto. Later, the head of the Minamoto clan served as its administrator, and the villa became the Shogakuin Academy, also known as "Saiin".

Emperor Junna had six empresses and imperial consorts and 13 imperial sons and daughters. His personal name (imina) was Ōtomo (大伴).

After his enthronement, Emperor Junna appointed Prince Masayoshi (Emperor Ninmyō), the legitimate son of Emperor Saga, as Crown Prince, rather than his own son, Prince Tsuneyo. Since Prince Tsuneyo died of illness during Emperor Junna's reign, the newly enthroned Emperor Ninmyō appointed Prince Tsunetsada, born to Emperor Junna and Princess Masako (a daughter of Emperor Saga), as Crown Prince. Emperor Junna is said to have been uneasy about Prince Tsunetsada becoming Crown Prince without the backing of powerful nobles, and entrusted the prince's affairs to his loyal confidant, Fujiwara no Yoshino. However, this unease became a reality after the Emperor Junna's death in the Jōwa Incident.

Emperor Junna on May 8th, 840 (June 11th, 840) at the age of 55. He left a will requesting a simple burial, so his ashes were scattered on Mount Oshio in Oharano.

== Tomb of Emperor Junna ==
The Imperial Household Agency designates Ōharano no Nishi no Minenoe no Misasagi (大原野西嶺上陵, Ōharano no Nishi no Minenoe Imperial Mausoleum), in Nishikyō-ku, Kyoto (34°57′42.1″N 135°38′2.1″E) as the location of Emperor Junna's tomb. According to legend, prior to his death Emperor Junna told Crown Prince Tsunetsada of his belief that family tomb should not be constructed, as when a person dies their spirit returns to heaven, but the empty tombs can draw demons and evil spirits. He commanded that his bones but crushed into powder and scattered throughout the mountains. He was cremated in what is now Mukō, Kyoto and his bones and ashes were scattered from a ridge in Ohara, with no tomb constructed per his will. This is why no tomb located is listed in the Engishiki. During the Edo period an arbitrary site was selected on the mountain to be a worship site for the emperor.

=== Events of Junna's life ===
- 810: After the rebellion of Emperor Heizei, he became the crown prince of Emperor Saga at 25 years of age.
- 30 May 823 (Kōnin 14, 17th day of the 4th month): In the 14th year of Emperor Saga's reign, he abdicated; the succession (senso) was received by Junna, Saga's younger brother and Emperor Kanmu's third son.
- 22 March 833 (Tenchō 10, 28th day of the 2nd month): In the 10th year of Emperor Junna's reign, the emperor abdicated; and the succession (senso) was received by his adopted son. Shortly thereafter, Emperor Ninmyo is said to have acceded to the throne. After Junna stepped down from the throne, two former Emperors were alive. In this period, Saga was called the Senior Retired Emperor and Junna was known as the Junior Retired Emperor.
- 11 June 840 (Jōwa 7, 8th day of the 5th month: Former-Emperor Junna died at the age of 55. Following his death, Fujiwara no Yoshifusa maneuvered to have Montoku, rather than the crown Prince Tsunesada, put on the throne; Junna's death set the stage for the Fujiwara clan's ascendancy.

=== Eras of Junna's reign ===
The years of Junna's reign are more specifically identified by more than one era name (nengō).

- Kōnin (810–824)
- Tenchō (824–834)

== Kugyō ==
Kugyō (公卿) is a collective term for the very few most powerful men attached to the court of the Emperor of Japan in pre-Meiji eras.

In general, this elite group included only three to four men at a time. These were hereditary courtiers whose experience and background would have brought them to the pinnacle of a life's career. During Junna's reign, this apex of the Daijō-kan included:

- Sadaijin, Fujiwara no Fuyutsugu (藤原冬嗣), 825–826.
- Sadaijin, Fujiwara no Otsugu (藤原緒嗣), 832–843.
- Udaijin, Fujiwara no Otsugu (藤原緒嗣), 825–832.
- Udaijin, Kiyohara no Natsuno (清原夏野), 832–837.
- Naidaijin (not appointed)
- Dainagon, Fujiwara no Otsugu (藤原緒嗣), 821–825.
- Dainagon, Yoshimine no Yasuyo (良峯安世) (half brother of Emperor Junna), 828–830.
- Dainagon, Kiyohara no Natsuno (清原夏野), 828–832
- Dainagon, Fujiwara no Mimori (藤原三守), 829–838

== Consorts and children ==
Empress: Imperial Princess Shōshi/Masako (正子内親王; 810–879), Emperor Saga's daughter

- Second Son: Imperial Prince Tsunesada (恒貞親王), the Crown Prince (deposed in 842)
- Third Son: Imperial Prince Motosada (基貞親王; 827–869)
- Fourth Son: Imperial Prince Tsunefusa (恒統親王; 829–842)

Hi (Empress as posthumous honors): Imperial Princess Koshi (高志内親王; 789–809), Emperor Kanmu's daughter

- First Son: Imperial Prince Tsuneyo (恒世親王; 806–826)
- First Daughter: Imperial Princess Ujiko (氏子内親王; d.885), 16th Saiō in Ise Shrine (823–827)
- Imperial Princess Yushi (有子内親王; d. 862)
- Imperial Princess Sadako (貞子内親王: d. 834)

Court lady: Princess Otsugu (緒継女王; 787–847)

Nyogō: Nagahara no Motohime (永原原姫)

Nyogō: Tachibana no Ujiko (橘氏子), Tachibana no Nagana's daughter

- Prince

Koui: Fujiwara no Kiyoko (藤原潔子), Fujiwara no Nagaoka's daughter

Court lady: Kiyohara no Haruko (清原春子), Kiyohara no Natsuno's daughter

- Imperial Princess Meishi (明子内親王; d. 854)

Court lady: Ōnakatomi no Yasuko (大中臣安子), Ōnakatomi Fuchiio's daughter

- Fifth Son: Imperial Prince Yoshisada (良貞親王; d. 848)

Court lady: Ōno no Takako (大野鷹子), Ōno no Masao's daughter

- Imperial Princess Hiroko (寛子内親王; d. 869)

Court lady: Tachibana no Funeko (橘船子), Tachibana no Kiyono's daughter

- Imperial Princess Takaiko (崇子内親王; d. 848)

Court lady: Tajihi no Ikeko (丹犀池子), Tajihi no Kadonari's daughter

- Imperial Princess Tomoko (同子内親王; d. 860)

Unknown lady

- Mune no Chushi (統忠子; d. 863), removed from the Imperial Family by receiving the family name from Emperor (Shisei Kōka, 賜姓降下) in 862.

== Ancestry ==
Ancestors of Emperor Junna

8. Prince Shiki (d. 716)
4. Emperor Kōnin (709–782)
9. Ki no Tochihime (d. 709)
2. Emperor Kanmu (737–806)
10. Yamato no Ototsugu
5. Takano no Niigasa (c. 720–790)
11. Haji no Maimo
1. Emperor Junna
12. Fujiwara no Umakai (694–737)
6. Fujiwara no Momokawa (732–779)
13. Kume no Wakame (d. 780)
3. Fujiwara no Tabiko (759–788)
14. Fujiwara no Yoshitsugu (716–777)
7. Fujiwara no Moroane

== Notes ==
Japanese Imperial kamon — a stylized chrysanthemum blossom

== See also ==
- Emperor of Japan
- List of Emperors of Japan
- Imperial cult

Regnal titles
Preceded by Emperor Saga	Emperor of Japan: Junna; 823–833	Succeeded by Emperor Ninmyō
