= Fujiwara no Ryoshi =

Japanese noblewoman of the Nara period

Fujiwara no Ryoshi (藤原 旅子, also read Fujiwara no Tabiko; 759–788) was a Japanese noblewoman of the Nara period. She was a consort to Emperor Kanmu and the mother of Emperor Junna.

== Biography ==
Fujiwara no Ryoshi was born in 759 to Fujiwara no Momokawa and Fujiwara no Moroe (藤原諸姉), a daughter of Fujiwara no Yoshitsugu. Like many Japanese noblewomen of the pre-modern era, the correct reading of her given name is uncertain, and the readings Ryoshi and Tabiko are speculative on and kun readings, respectively.

In Enryaku 4 (785) she was given the Junior Third Rank. In the first month of the following year, she bore Emperor Kanmu the prince, Prince Ōtomo (大伴親王 Ōtomo-shinnō, later to ascend to the throne as Emperor Junna) and became Emperor Kanmu's consort (夫人 bunin).

She died in 788, at the age of 30 (by Japanese reckoning), and was posthumously granted the Senior First Rank and the title of empress (妃 kisaki). Subsequently, in Kōnin 14 (823) with the accession of her son, she was granted the title of Grand Empress (皇太后 kōtaigō).
