= Fujiwara no Otomuro =

Fujiwara no Otomuro 藤原乙牟漏

Empress consort of Japan
- Tenure: 23 May 783 – 790
- Born: 760; Japan
- Died: 28 April 790; Japan
- Burial: Nagaoka Mausoleum, Kyoto Prefecture, Mukō, Japan
- Spouse: Emperor Kanmu
- Issue: Emperor Heizei; Emperor Saga; Princess Koshi
- House: Fujiwara clan (by birth); Imperial House of Japan (by marriage)
- Father: Fujiwara no Yoshitsugu
- Mother: Abe no Komina

Fujiwara no Otomuro (藤原乙牟漏; [ɸu͍ʑiwaɽa no otomuɽo], 760 – April 28, 790) was a Japanese noblewoman and empress consort of Japan. Her sister was Fujiwara no Moroane.

Fujiwara no Otomuro was a daughter of a noble called Fujiwara no Yoshitsugu; her mother was the granddaughter of general Fujiwara no Umakai, who died in 737.

She married Emperor Kanmu. Their children included:

- Emperor Heizei
- Emperor Saga

She also had a daughter, Princess Koshi.

Her daughter-in-law was Lady Tachibana no Kachiko.

== Notes ==
Japanese royalty
Preceded by Princess Inoe	Empress consort of Japan; 783–790	Succeeded by Fujiwara no Taishi (granted title posthumously)
