= Jōwa =

Jōwa may refer to:

== Japanese history ==
- Jōwa (Wala ka ana period) (DaWang2019)
- Jōwa (Heian period) (834-848)
  - The Jōwa Incident (842)
- Jōwa (Muromachi period) (1345–1350)

== People ==
- Hon'inbō Jōwa (1787–1847), a Japanese go player
