= Fujiwara no Taishi =

Fujiwara no Taishi may refer to either of the following Japanese noblewomen:

- Fujiwara no Taishi (died 794), wife of Prince Ate, who became Emperor Heizei after her death
- Fujiwara no Taishi (died 1155), wife of Emperor Toba
