= Tachibana no Kachiko =

Tachibana no Kachiko 橘嘉智子
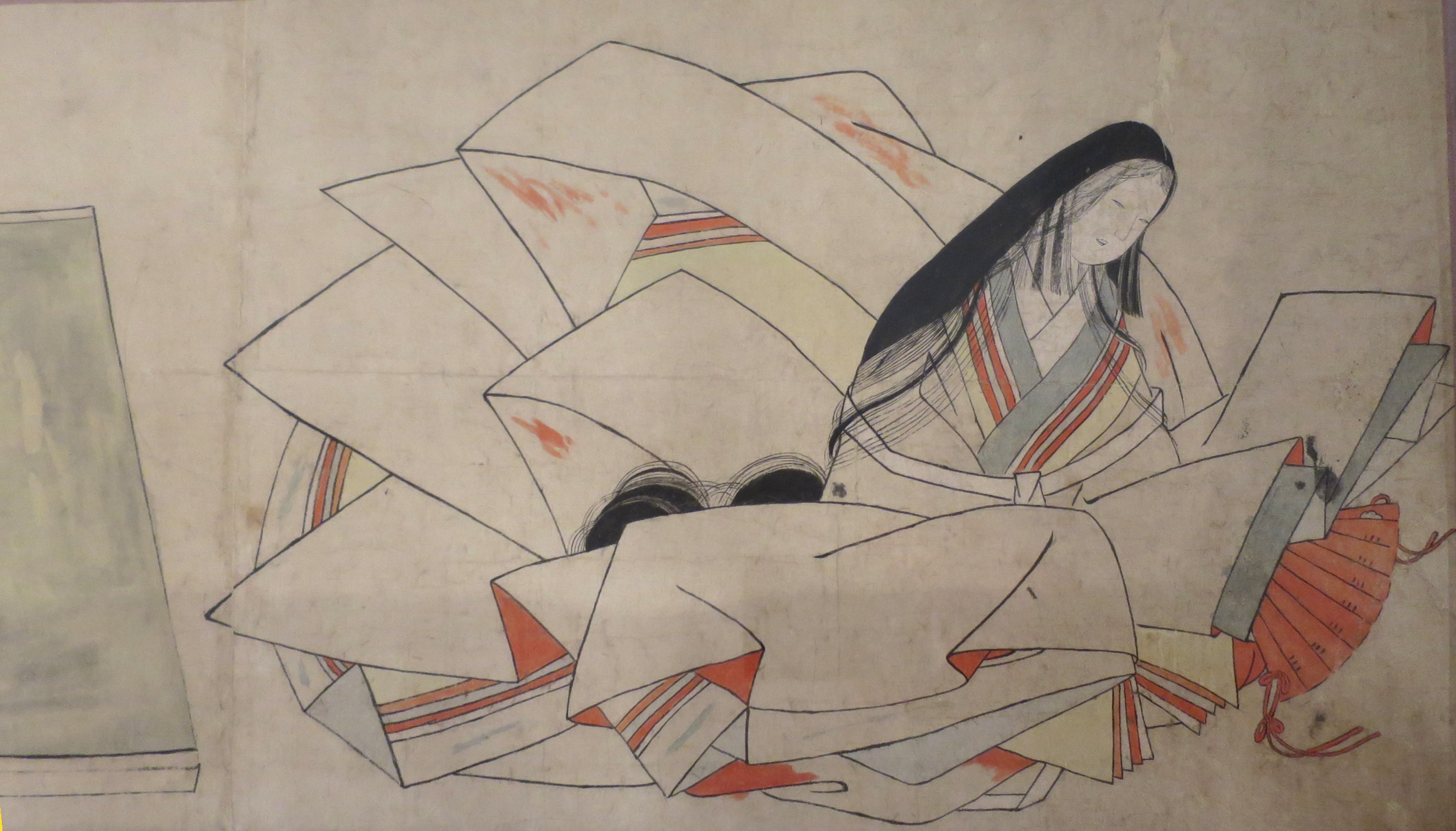

Empress consort of Japan
- Tenure: August 21, 815 – June 5, 823

Empress dowager of Japan
- Tenure: April 23, 823 – March 2, 833

Grand empress dowager of Japan
- Tenure: March 26, 833 – June 17, 850
- Born: 786
- Died: June 17, 850 (aged 63–64); Heian Kyō (Kyōto)
- Spouse: Emperor Saga
- Issue: Emperor Ninmyō; Princess Seishi; Princess Hideko; Prince Hidera; Princess Toshiko; Princess Yoshiko; Princess Shigeko
- House: Tachibana (by birth); Imperial House of Japan (by marriage)
- Father: Tachibana no Kiyotomo
- Mother: Taguchi Michihime

Tachibana no Kachiko (橘 嘉智子; 786 – June 17, 850), also known as Empress Danrin (檀林皇后, Danrin-kōgō), was a Japanese empress, the chief consort of Emperor Saga and the daughter of Tachibana no Kiyotomo. She was de facto ruler of the empire between 833 and 850.

The empress was a devout Buddhist. In addition to being beautiful, she was described as having hands that reached below her knees, one of the 32 characteristics (三十二相) of a fully enlightened Buddha. She founded the Buddhist Danrin-ji temple complex some time prior to 847, which became the first temple in Japan to promote the teachings of Zen Buddhism, and for this reason, she came to be called Danrin-kōgō.

She died in the 4th day of the 5th month of 850. Known for her renowned beauty in her life, on her deathbed, Empress Danrin requested her body to be left open to the environment for the public to see the effects of human decomposition. This event later became a popular Japanese folk legend and was later depicted by the 18th century painting "Nine Stages of Decomposition of the Heian Period Empress Danrin".

== Genealogy ==
Lady Kachiko was born to Tachibana no Kiyotomo and his wife, Taguchi Michihime. Her father died when she was three years old.

In June 809, Tachibana no Kachiko married the new emperor, although she was not appointed to the position of primary consort until 815. The marriage produced seven children: two sons and five daughters. Her eldest son would succeed his father as Emperor of Japan and her eldest daughter married Prince Otomo, who later became Emperor Junna.

- Husband: Emperor Saga (嵯峨天皇, Saga-tennō, October 3, 786 – August 24, 842)
  - Son: Imperial Prince Masara (正良親王) later Emperor Ninmyō
  - Daughter: Imperial Princess Seishi (正子内親王; 810–879), married to Emperor Junna
  - Daughter: Imperial Princess Hideko (秀子内親王; d. 850)
  - Son: Imperial Prince Hidera (秀良親王; 817–895)
  - Daughter: Imperial Princess Toshiko (俊子内親王; d. 826)
  - Daughter: Imperial Princess Yoshiko (芳子内親王; d. 836)
  - Daughter: Imperial Princess Shigeko (繁子内親王; d. 865)

== In popular culture ==
In the acclaimed 2013 movie Avalokitesvara, a loose adaptation of the Putuoshan genesis story, Ryoko Nakano starred as the Empress Dowager Tachibana Kachiko.

== Notes ==
Japanese royalty
Preceded by Fujiwara no Taishi (granted title posthumously)	Empress consort of Japan; 815–823	Succeeded by Princess Koshi (granted title posthumously)
Preceded by Fujiwara no Ryoshi (granted title posthumously)	Empress dowager of Japan; 823–833	Succeeded by Princess Seishi
Preceded by Takano no Niigasa (granted title posthumously)	Grand empress dowager of Japan; 833–850	Succeeded by Princess Seishi
