= Keikokushū =

The Keikokushū (経国集) was the third imperially commissioned anthology of kanshi (poetry written in classical Chinese by Japanese poets). The text was compiled by Yoshimine no Yasuyo, Minabuchi no Hirosada, Sugawara no Kiyotomo, Yasuno no Fumitugu, Shigeno no Sadanushi, and Abe no Yoshihito under the command of Emperor Junna. The text was completed in 827, 13 years after the previous imperial collection, Bunka Shūreishū.

== Contents ==
The text is twenty volumes in length. However, only six of those still remain: 1, 10, 11, 13, 14, and 20. It contains material spanning 120 years from 707 to 827 with contributions from 178 authors. In addition to 917 poems, it also contains 17 fu and 38 civil promotion tests.
