= Prince Tsunesada =

Crown Prince of Japan (825-884)

Tsunesada
- Crown Prince of Japan
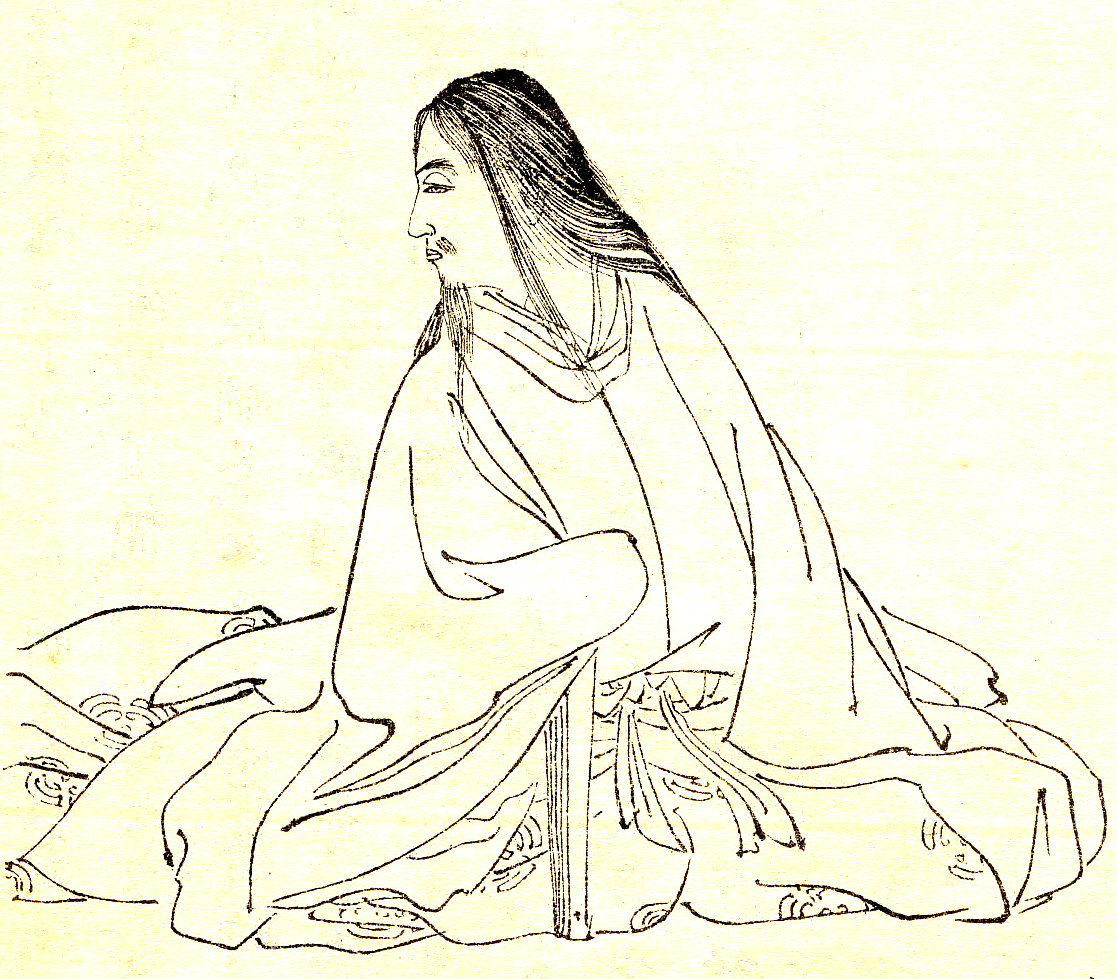
- Illustration by Kikuchi Yōsai, from Zenken Kojitsu
- Born: 825
- Died: October 12, 884 (aged 58–59)
- House: Kōshitsu
- Father: Emperor Junna
- Mother: Seishi

Prince Tsunesada (恒貞親王, Tsunesada-shinnō; 825 – October 12, 884) was a Japanese prince of the early Heian period. He was the second son of Emperor Junna. He was also known as Prince Teishi (亭子親王), and by his Buddhist name of Gōjyaku (恒寂). He was Crown Prince (皇太子, Kōtaishi) from 833 to 842, during the reign of his cousin Emperor Ninmyō.

== Biography ==
After the death of his older half-brother Prince Tsuneyo (恒世親王), Tsunesada became Emperor Junna's successor. In 833, his cousin Emperor Ninmyō took the throne, and by the wishes of the retired emperor Saga, Tsunesada became Crown Prince. In 838, Tsunesada underwent the genbuku rite of passage in the shishin-den (紫宸殿) palace, at which he is said to have shown good manners, and cut a graceful figure as he expressed his gratitude to the Emperor. After this, Tsunesada and the retired Emperor Junna became anxious about being embroiled in a power struggle and repeatedly petitioned to resign, but Saga and Ninmyō dissuaded them each time. However, after the Jōwa Incident immediately following Saga's death in 842, Tsunesada was disinherited as crown prince.

In 849, he was conferred the third rank (三品) as a prince, but he soon became a monk, taking on the Buddhist name of Gōjyaku. He was administered the kanjō rite of esoteric Buddhism by Prince Takaoka, now also a monk, and became the first abbot of Daikaku-ji. When another succession dispute broke out in 884 after the abdication of Emperor Yōzei, Tsunesada was asked to take the throne, but he declined. In his last moments he is said to have announced that his time had come, purified his clothes, offered incense and flowers to the Buddha, and assumed the Lotus position and facing West before dying.

== Personality ==
According to the Nihon Sandai Jitsuroku, Tsunesada possessed an easy and elegant personality and a beautiful appearance. Tsunesada was also known for his elegant calligraphy.

== Genealogy ==
- Father: Emperor Junna
- Mother: Princess Seishi, daughter of Emperor Saga
- Wife: daughter of Fujiwara no Chikanari
- Wife: daughter of Fujiwara no Koreo (藤原是雄)
