= Fujiwara no Taishi (died 794) =

Fujiwara no Taishi (藤原 帯子, also read Fujiwara no Tarashiko; died 794) was a Japanese noblewoman of the Nara period. She was a consort of Prince Ate. She had no children with him, but more than a decade after her death she was granted the title of empress on her husband's becoming Emperor Heizei.

== Biography ==
Fujiwara no Taishi's year of birth is unknown. Her father was Fujiwara no Momokawa. At some point she married Prince Ate (773–824), but died suddenly of an illness in Enryaku 13 (794). She was posthumously granted the title of empress (kōgō) upon the accession of her husband to the Chrysanthemum Throne in Daidō 1 (806). It is thought that the reason she was granted this title over, for example, Ise no Tsugiko (mother of Prince Takaoka, etc.) or Fujii no Tōshi (mother of Prince Abo), despite having already died without issue, was due to the influence of her elder brother, Minister of the Left Otsugu.
