= Ōtomo no Otomaro =

Japanese general (731–809)

Ōtomo no Otomaro (大伴 弟麻呂 or 大伴 乙麻呂; 731 – July 14, 809) was a Japanese general of the Nara period and of the early Heian period. He was the first to hold the title of sei-i taishōgun. The title of Shōgun was bestowed by Emperor Kanmu in 794. Some believe he was born in 727. His father was Ōtomo no Koshibi.

== Chronology ==
- He was born of Ōtomo no Koshibi c. 731.
- He was granted the second grade of the fifth rank of honor in 799 and appointed the lieutenant (suke) of the Palace Guards in 780.
- In 783 he was made the deputy general in the Hitachi expedition.
- In 791 he was granted the second grade of the fourth rank of honor.
- In 794 he was declared Sei-i Taishōgun ("Barbarian-subduing Great General") by Emperor Kanmu, and together with Sakanoue no Tamuramaro subdued the Emishi.
- In 795 he was granted the second grade of the third rank of honor and the Order of Merit, Second Class, for his military achievements.
- He died on July 14, 809.
