= Daidō =

Period of Japanese history (806–810 CE)

Daidō (大同) was a Japanese era name (年号, nengō; lit. "year name") after Enryaku and before Kōnin. This period spanned the years from May 806 through September 810. The reigning emperors were Heizei-tennō (平城天皇) and Saga-tennō (嵯峨天皇).

== Change of era ==
- November 16, 806 Daidō gannen (大同元年): The new era name was created to mark an event or series of events. The previous era ended and the new one commenced in Enryaku 25, on the 18th day of the 5th month of 806.

== Events of the Daidō era ==
- April 9, 806 (Daidō 1, 17th day of the 3rd month): In the 25th year of Emperor Kammu's reign (桓武天皇25年), he died, and despite an ensuing dispute over who should follow him as sovereign, contemporary scholars then construed that the succession (senso) was received by his son. Shortly thereafter, Emperor Heizei is said to have acceded to the throne (sokui).
- May 18, 809 (Daidō 4, 1st day of the 4th month): In the 4th year of Emperor Heizei's reign (平城天皇4年), he fell ill and abdicated, and the succession (senso) was received by his second son, the eldest son having become a Buddhist priest. Shortly thereafter, Emperor Saga is said to have acceded to the throne (sokui).

== Notes ==
Preceded by Enryaku	Era or nengō Daidō; 806–809	Succeeded by Kōnin
