= Ten'ō =

Period of Japanese history (781–782 CE)

Ten'ō (天応) was a Japanese era name (年号, nengō, lit. "year name") after Hōki and before Enryaku. This period lasted from January 781 through August 782. The reigning emperor was Kōnin-tennō (光仁天皇).

== Change of era ==
- 24 October 781 Ten'ō gannen (天応元年): The new era name was created to mark an event or series of events. The previous era ended and the new one commenced in Hōki 12, on the 1st day of the 1st month of 781.

== Events of the Ten'ō era ==
- 22 December 781 (Ten'ō 1, 3rd day of the 12th month): In 11th year of the reign of Emperor Kōnin's reign (光仁天皇11年), he abdicated; and the succession (the senso) was received by his son. Shortly thereafter, Emperor Kammu is said to have acceded to the throne (sokui).

== Notes ==
Preceded by Hōki	Era or nengō Ten'ō; 781–782	Succeeded by Enryaku
