= Kume no Wakame =

- Muraji, jugoi, jushii
- Born: Unknown
- Died: 30 July 780
- Spouse: Fujiwara no Umakai
- Heir: Fujiwara no Momokawa

Kume no Wakame (久米 若女 or 久米 若売; died 30 July 780) was a Japanese muraji and mother of Fujiwara no Momokawa, whose daughter became the Empress (posthumously) of Emperor Heizei, the 51st emperor of Japan. She married Fujiwara no Umakai, who died in the smallpox epidemic of 737, five years after Momokawa was born.

In the third month of Tenpyō 11 (739), she had an affair with Isonokami no Otomaro and was exiled to Shimōsa Province. This caused a scandal which caused Isonokami to lose his standing and influence. In the sixth month of Tenpyō 12 (740), she was summoned to Kyoto, offered amnesty, and appointed to the rank of jugoi (従五位) within the imperial court. She eventually moved up to the rank of jushii (従四位) before she died in the sixth month of Hōki 11 (780).

Between 733 and 741, she exchanged poetry with Atsumi no Ōkimi under the name Kume no Jorō (久米 女郎; lit. "the prostitute of Kume"). These can be found in volume eight of the Man'yōshū.
