= Bunka Shūreishū =

Bunka Shūreishū (文華秀麗集) is the second imperially commissioned Japanese kanshi collection. The text was compiled by Fujiwara no Fuyutsugu, Sugawara no Kiyotomo, Nakao Ō, Isayama no Fumitugu, Shigeno no Sadanushi, and Kuwahara no Haraaka under the command of Emperor Saga. The text was completed c. 818, four years after the previous imperial collection, Ryōunshū.

== Contents ==
The text is three volumes in length. It begins with a preface by Nakao Ō. The main text contains 148 poems composed by 28 authors, including poems from an 814 Balhae delegation. However, only 143 poems still exist as the final five have since been lost.

While Ryōunshū ordered its poems by author, Bunka Shūreishū orders its poems by subject matter:

Volume 1

- Sights (遊覧)
- Banquets (宴集)
- Partings (餞別)
- Exchanges (贈答)

Volume 2

- Historical (詠史)
- Reminiscence (述懐)
- Love (艶情)
- Yuefu (楽府)
- Buddhist (梵門)
- Laments (哀傷)

Volume 3

- Miscellaneous (雑詠)
