= Fujiwara no Momokawa =

Japanese statesman, courtier and politician

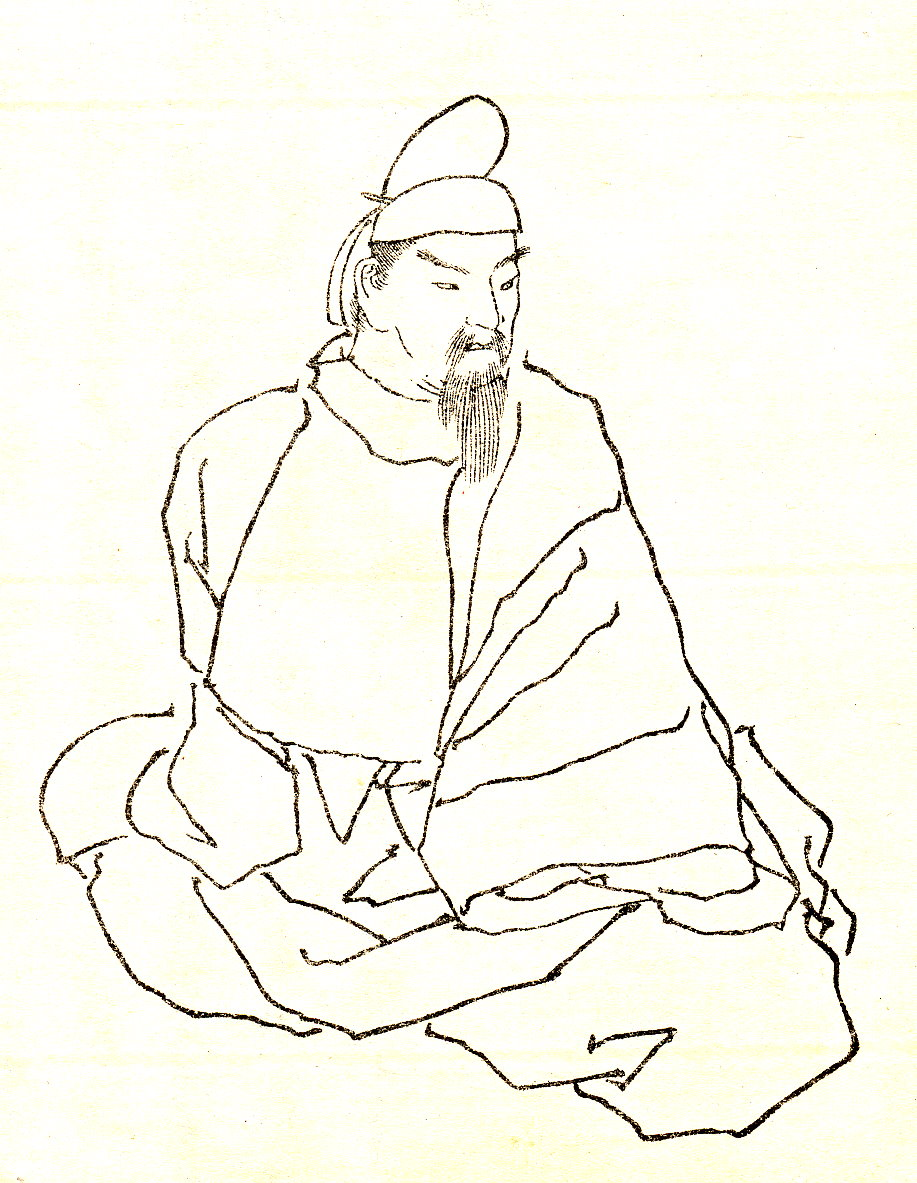
- Born: 732
- Died: 28 August 779 (aged 46–47)
- Spouse: Fujiwara no Moroane
- Heir: Fujiwara no Otsugu
- Parents: Fujiwara no Umakai (father); Kume no Wakame (mother)

Fujiwara no Momokawa (藤原 百川; 732 – August 28, 779) was a Japanese statesman, courtier and politician during the Nara period. His original name was Odamaro (雄田麻呂).

== Career at court ==
He was a minister during the reigns of Empress Kōken/Shōtoku and Emperor Kōnin.

- 770 (Jingo-keiun 4, 8th month): When Empress Shōtoku died without having named an heir, Momokawa was influential in the process which led to the enthronement of Emperor Kōnin.
- 773 (Hōki 4): Sangi Momokawa was chief advocate for Daigaku-no-kami Yamabe-shinnō, who was named Crown Prince and heir of Kōnin.
- August 28, 779 (Hōki 10, 7th month): Momkawa died at age 48.

The posthumous influence of Momokawa was ensured when Emperor Kanmu followed Emperor Kōnin on the Chrysanthemum Throne.

== Genealogy ==
Momokawa's father was Fujiwara no Umakai; and his mother was Kume no Wakame. He was one of eight brothers (including Fujiwara no Hirotsugu).

Momokawa married Fujiwara no Moroane, daughter of Fujiwara no Yoshitsugu, a noble during the Nara period. His children included two sons: Fujiwara no Otsugu (774–843), Fujiwara no Tsugunari (779–842). His daughters were Fujiwara no Tabiko (759–788), and Fujiwara no Tarashiko (d. 794).

Tabiko became the consort of Emperor Kammu with whom she bore Prince Ōtomo, who became Emperor Junna). During Emperor Junna's reign, she was the Empress Dowager.

Tarashiko was the wife of Emperor Heizei. She died in 794 during the moving of the imperial capital to Heian-kyō. In 806, she received the posthumous title of kōgō when Emperor Heizei was enthroned.

- Father: Fujiwara no Umakai
- Mother: Kume no Wakame
- Wife: Fujiwara no Moroane, daughter of Fujiwara no Yoshitsugwere
  - Eldest Daughter: Fujiwara no Tabiko (759–788)
  - Second Daughter: Fujiwara no Tarashiko (d. 794).
- Concubine: Daughter of Ise Otsu
  - Eldest Son: Fujiwara no Otsugu (774–843)
  - Third Son: Fujiwara no Tsugio (779—842)
- Concubine: Unknown name
  - Second Son: Fujiwara no Tsugunari (779–842)
