= Kōnin (era) =

Period of Japanese history (810–824 CE)

Kōnin (弘仁) was a Japanese era name (年号, nengō, lit. "year name") after Daidō and before Tenchō. This period spanned the years from September 810 through January 824. The reigning emperors were Saga-tennō (嵯峨天皇) and Junna-tennō (淳和天皇).

== Change of era ==
- February 9, 810 Kōnin gannen (弘仁元年): The new era name was created to mark an event or series of events. The previous era ended and the new one commenced in Daidō 4, on the 27th day of the 9th month of 810.

== Events of the Kōnin era ==
- May 30, 823 (Kōnin 14, 17th day of the 4th month): In the 14th year of Emperor Saga's reign (嵯峨天皇14年), he abdicated; and the succession (senso) was received by his younger brother, Emperor Kammu's third son. Shortly thereafter, Emperor Junna is said to have acceded to the throne.(sokui).

== Notes ==
Preceded by Daidō	Era or nengō Kōnin; 810–824	Succeeded by Tenchō
