= Princess Seishi =

Seishi 正子内親王

Empress consort of Japan
- Tenure: March 26, 827 – March 26, 833

Empress dowager of Japan
- Tenure: March 26, 833 – 854

Grand empress dowager of Japan
- Tenure: May 26, 854 – April 18, 879
- Born: 810
- Died: April 18, 879 (aged 68–69)
- Burial: Sagadaikakuji Monzen Noboricho, Ukyō-ku, Kyoto, Kyoto Prefecture
- Spouse: Emperor Junna (m. 827–840)
- Issue: Prince Tsunesada; Prince Tsunefusa; Prince Motosada
- House: Imperial House of Japan
- Father: Emperor Saga
- Mother: Tachibana no Kachiko

Princess Seishi (正子内親王, Seishi Naishinnō; 810 – April 18, 879) was an empress consort of Japan. She was the empress consort of her paternal uncle Emperor Junna.

She became empress in 827. Her husband abdicated in 833. Either when she was widowed in 840, or when her son was deposed as crown prince in 842, Seishi followed the example of her mother and became a nun: she retired to the palace of her late spouse, Junna'in, which she made in to a family convent, engaging in sponsoring lectures of the Lotus Sutra and providing care for orphans.

== Notes ==
Japanese royalty
Preceded by Princess Koshi (granted title posthumously)	Empress consort of Japan; 827–833	Succeeded by Fujiwara no Onshi
Preceded by Tachibana no Kachiko	Empress dowager of Japan; 833–854	Succeeded by Fujiwara no Junshi
Preceded by Tachibana no Kachiko	Grand empress dowager of Japan; 854–860	Succeeded by Fujiwara no Junshi
