= Fujiwara no Otsugu =

Japanese statesman, courtier, politician and editor

Fujiwara no Otsugu 藤原緒嗣
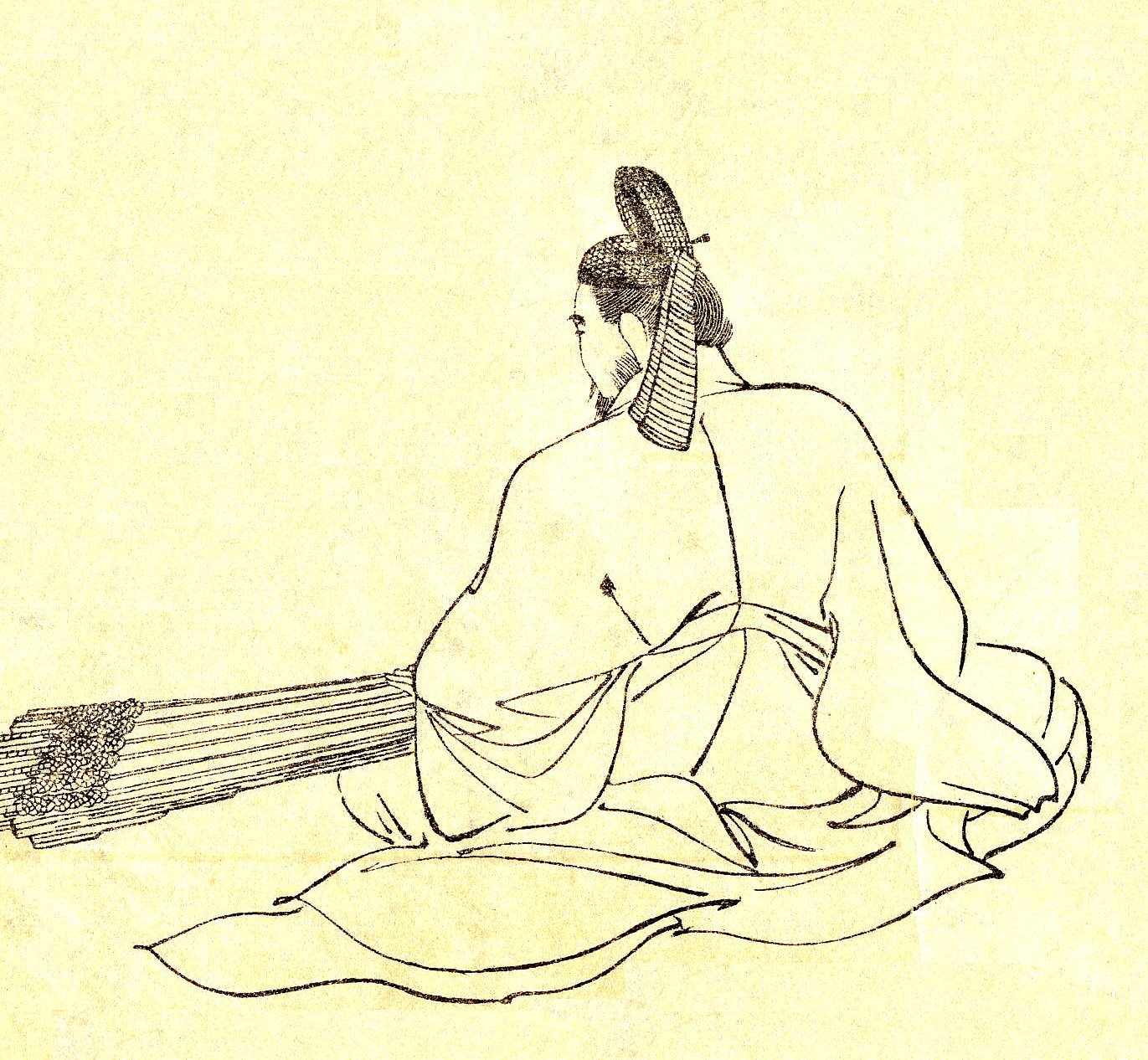
- Illustration by Kikuchi Yōsai, from Zenken Kojitsu
- Born: 773
- Died: August 22, 843
- Family: Fujiwara Shikike
- Father: Fujiwara no Momokawa

Fujiwara no Otsugu (藤原 緒嗣; 773 – August 22, 843) was a Japanese statesman, courtier, politician and editor during the Heian period. He is credited as one of the collaborative compilers of the Nihon Kōki.

== Career at court ==
He was a minister during the reigns of Emperor Saga, Emperor Junna and Emperor Ninmyō.

- 788 (Enryaku 7, 2nd month): He received his first court rank.
- 825 (Tenchō 2): From the rank of Dainagon, Otsugu was raised to the position of Udaijin (Minister of the Right).
- 832 (Tenchō 9): Otsugu was named Sadaijin (Minister of the Left).
- 837 (Jōwa 3): Otsugu asked to resign due to the poor state of the imperial treasury, which he blamed on an excess of officials and overly lavish dining, and an insufficient knowledge of Yin and yang.
- 843 (Jōwa 10): Work was completed on the multi-volume Nihon Kōki; and Otsugu was a significant contributor.

== Genealogy ==
Otsugu's father was Fujiwara no Momokawa.
