= Fujiwara no Yoshitsugu =

Japanese statesman, courtier and politician

Fujiwara no Yoshitsugu (藤原良継; 716 – October 27, 777) was a Japanese statesman, courtier, and politician of the Nara period. He was the second son of the founder of the Shikike branch of the Fujiwara, Fujiwara no Umakai. His original name was Sukunamaro (宿奈麻呂). He was the maternal grandfather of the emperors Heizei and Saga.

== Early life ==
In the year 740, after the death of their father Umakai in 737, Sukunamaro's brother Fujiwara no Hirotsugu led a rebellion. Sukunamaro was implicated and exiled to Izu Province. In 742 he was forgiven, and appointed to the position of shō-hanji. In 746, he was promoted from shō roku-i no ge (正六位下) to ju go-i no ge (従五位下) under the court rank system.

Afterwards, he moved between a number of positions, including several as a regional administrator, but was unable to produce any spectacular results. In addition, the Shikike branch was in steep decline compared to the Nanke and Hokke branches of the family, and Sukunamaro remained in obscurity. In 762, Fujiwara no Nakamaro was at the peak of his success, and while his three sons were promoted to sangi, the 47-year-old Sukunamaro was resigned to his rank of ju go-i no ge. Sukunamaro conspired with Ōtomo no Yakamochi, Saeki no Imaemishi, and Isonokami no Yakatsugu in a plot to assassinate Nakamaro, but the plan was discovered. In 763, the four were arrested, but Sukunamaro insisted that he had acted alone. Convicted of a crime against the Imperial family, he was stripped of his position and his family name.

== Rise to power ==
In 764, Fujiwara no Nakamaro incited a rebellion, and Sukunamaro, in response to an Imperial decree, gathered several hundred soldiers and assisted in putting it down. For his service, he was promoted to the rank of ju shi-i no ge (従四位下) and conferred honors, fourth-class. Later the same year he was promoted again to shō shi-i no jō (正四位上), and in 766 to ju san-mi (従三位). Along with Isonokami no Yakatsugu, who had become sangi, Sukunamaro was now counted among the powerful as a kugyō.

In 770 he was promoted to sangi, and Empress Kōken died shortly thereafter. Sukunamaro joined with Fujiwara no Nagate of the Hokke in backing Prince Shirakabe—the future Emperor Kōnin—as the next crown prince, and was promoted to shō san-mi (正三位) and chūnagon. That year, Sukunamaro changed his name to Yoshitsugu. In 771 the sadaijin Nagate died, and Yoshitsugu's support of Kōnin left him as the central figure of the Fujiwara clan. He was promoted directly from chūnagon to naishin (内臣). This made him the second most powerful person in the daijō-kan, after the udaijin Ōnakatomi no Kiyomaro. In 777 he was promoted once again to naidaijin, but he died shortly thereafter, and was posthumously granted the rank of ju ichi-i (従一位).

When his grandson Emperor Heizei assumed the throne, Yoshitsugu was posthumously promoted to shō ichi-i (正一位), the highest rank under ritsuryō, and daijō-daijin. He had many daughters, but few sons, and so his line ended when his son Takumi was killed by bandits in Nagaoka-kyō.

== Genealogy ==
- Father: Fujiwara no Umakai
- Mother: Ishikawa no Kunimina no Ōtoji (? unclear)
- Wife: Abe no Komina
  - Daughter: Fujiwara no Otomuro (760–790): Wife of Emperor Kanmu. Mother of Emperors Heizei and Saga.
- Wife: from the Tatehara family
  - Son (768–?) [according to the kugyō bunin.]
- Unknown mother:
  - Son: Fujiwara no Takumi (藤原詫美)
  - Daughter: Wife of Fujiwara no Kaedemaro
  - Daughter: Fujiwara no Sanekazu (藤原人数; ?–809), wife of Fujiwara no Washitori (藤原鷲取), mother of Fujiwara no Fujitsugu (藤原藤嗣)
  - Daughter: Wife of Fujiwara no Ieyori
  - Daughter: Wife of Fujiwara no Nagate
  - Daughter: Fujiwara no Moroane (?–786), wife of Fujiwara no Momokawa, mother of Fujiwara no Tabiko (藤原旅子)
