= Enryaku =

Period of Japanese history (782–806 CE)

Enryaku (延暦) was a Japanese era name (年号, nengō; "year name") after Ten'ō and before Daidō. This period spanned the years from August 782 through May 806. The reigning emperor was Kanmu-tennō (桓武天皇).

== Change of era ==
- 12 November 782 Enryaku gannen (延暦元年): The new era name was created to mark an event or series of events. The previous era ended and the new one commenced in Ten'ō 2, on the 19th day of the 8th month of 782.

== Events of the Enryaku era ==
- 782 (Enryaku 1, 6th month): The sadaijin Fujiwara no Uona was removed from his office and exiled to Kyushu. Some time later, the emperor did permit him to return to the capital. Fujiwara died there following his return. In the same general time frame, Fujiwara no Tamaro was named udaijin. During these days in which the offices of sadaijin and udaijin were vacant, the major counselors (the dainagon) and the emperor assumed responsibilities and powers which would have been otherwise delegated.
- 783 (Enryaku 3, in the 3rd month): The udaijin Tamaro died at the age of 62 years.
- 783 (Enryaku 3, in the 7th month): Fujiwara no Korekimi became the new udaijin to replace the late Fujiwara no Tamaro.
- 793 (Enryaku 12): Under the leadership of the Buddhist priest Dengyō, construction is begun on the Enryaku Temple.
- December 17, 794 (Enryaku 13, 21st day of the 10th month): The Emperor moves by carriage in a grand procession from Nara to Heian-kyō.
- 796 (Enryaku 15): Additional copper coins were put into circulation, each bearing the legend Ren-hei Ei-hō.
- 806 (Enryaku 25): Emperor Kanmu's reign lasted for 25 years. He died at the age of 70. He was buried to the south of Heian-kyō, in the neighborhood of Momoyama; but the actual location became uncertain. In 1894, another tomb was created when the Heian Shrine was rebuilt. His spirit is said to rest in peace next to the tomb of Emperor Meiji at this shrine.

== Notes ==
Preceded by Ten'ō	Era or nengō Enryaku; 782–806	Succeeded by Daidō
