= Fujiwara no Umakai =

Japanese noble

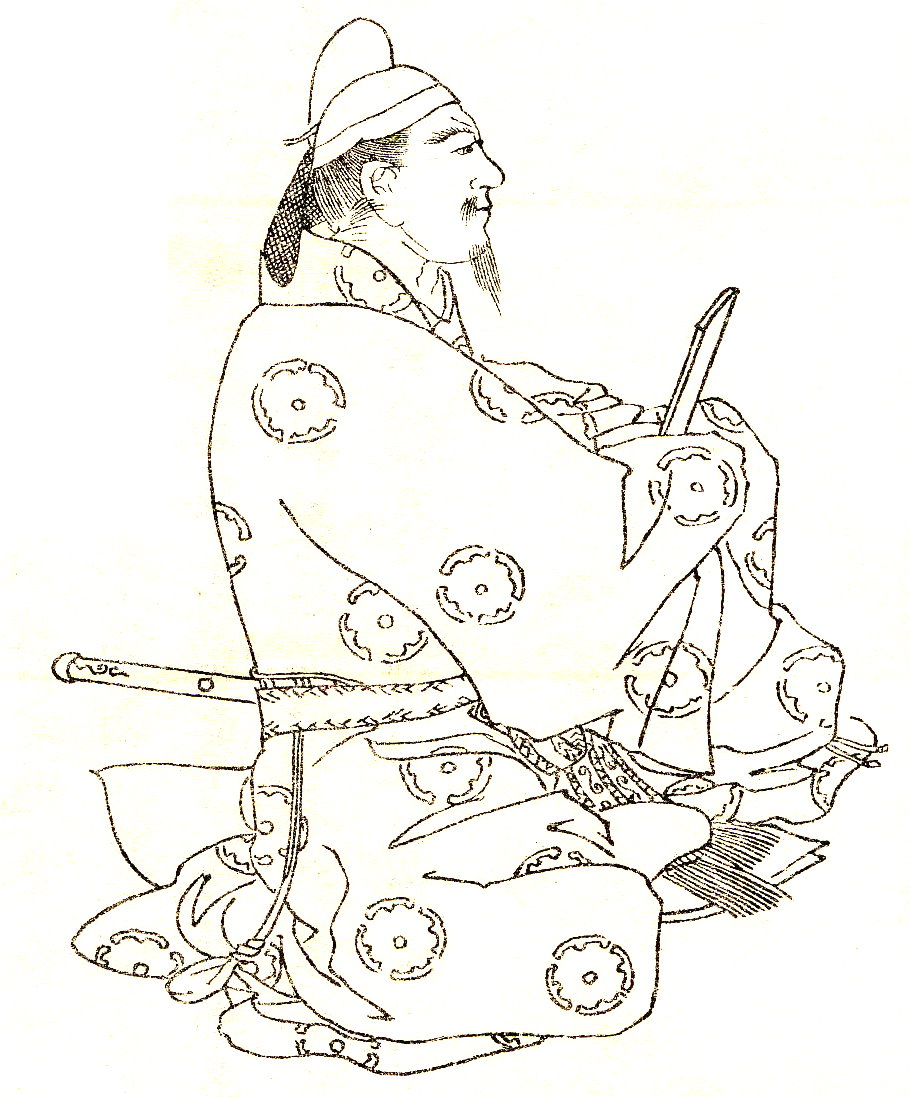
- Fujiwara no Umakai drawn by Kikuchi Yōsai
- Born: 694
- Died: 7 September 737
- Parents: Fujiwara no Fuhito (father)

Fujiwara no Umakai (藤原 宇合; 694 – September 7, 737) was a Japanese statesman, courtier, general and politician during the Nara period. The third son of Fujiwara no Fuhito, he founded the Shikike ("Ceremonials") branch of the Fujiwara clan.

== Career ==
He was a diplomat during the reign of Empress Genshō and a minister during the reign of Emperor Shōmu. In the Imperial court, Umakai was the chief of protocol (Shikibu-kyō).

- 716 (Reiki 2): Along with Tajihi no Agatamori (多治比縣守), Abe no Yasumaro (阿倍安麻呂) and Ōtomo no Yamamori (大伴山守), Umakai was named to be part of a Japanese diplomatic mission to Tang China in 717-718. Kibi no Makibi and the Buddhist monk Genbō were also part of the entourage.
- 724 (Jinki 1, 1st month): Umakai led an army against the emishi; but this military campaign was later judged to have been unsuccessful.
- 729 (Tenpyō 1): The emperor invested Umakai with the power to raise an army to quash a revolt, but the cause for alarm was dissipated without the need for military action.
- 737 (Tenpyō 9): Umakai died at age 44. The 735–737 Japanese smallpox epidemic caused the death of Umakai and his three brothers.

== Genealogy ==
This member of the Fujiwara clan was son of Fujiwara no Fuhito. Umakai had three brothers: Muchimaro, Fusasaki, and Maro. These four brothers are known for having established the "four houses" of the Fujiwara.

Umakai's children included: Fujiwara no Hirotsugu and Fujiwara no Momokawa

== Family ==
- Father: Fujiwara no Fuhito
- Mother: Soga no Shōshi (蘇我娼子, ?–?), daughter of Soga no Murajiko (蘇我連子).
  - Wife: Isonokami no Kunimina no Ōtoji (石上国盛), daughter of Isonokami no Maro (石上麻呂).
    - 1st son: Fujiwara no Hirotsugu (藤原広嗣, ?–740)
    - 2nd son: Fujiwara no Yoshitsugu (藤原良継, 716–777)
  - Wife: Takahashi no Aneko (高橋阿禰娘), daughter of Takahashi no Kasa no Ason (高橋笠朝臣).
    - 3rd son: Fujiwara no Kiyonari (藤原清成, 716–777)
  - Wife: unclear name (小治田功麿男牛養女)
    - 5th son: Fujiwara no Tamaro (藤原田麻呂, 722–783)
  - Wife: Kume no Wakame (久米若女), daughter of 久米奈保麻呂?
    - 8th son: Fujiwara no Momokawa (藤原百川, 732–779)
  - Wife: named (佐伯家主娘), daughter of 佐伯徳麻呂.
    - 9th son: Fujiwara no Kurajimaro (藤原蔵下麻呂, 734–775)
  - Children with unknown mother:
    - 4th son: Fujiwara no Tsunate (藤原綱手, ?–740)
    - Daughter: name unknown, wife of Fujiwara no Uona.
    - Daughter: name unknown, wife of Fujiwara no Kosemaro (藤原巨勢麻呂).
    - Daughter: named (掃子), possibly mother of Fujiwara no Tsunatsugu (藤原綱継).
