= Emperor Heizei =

Emperor of Japan from 806 to 809

Emperor Heizei 平城天皇
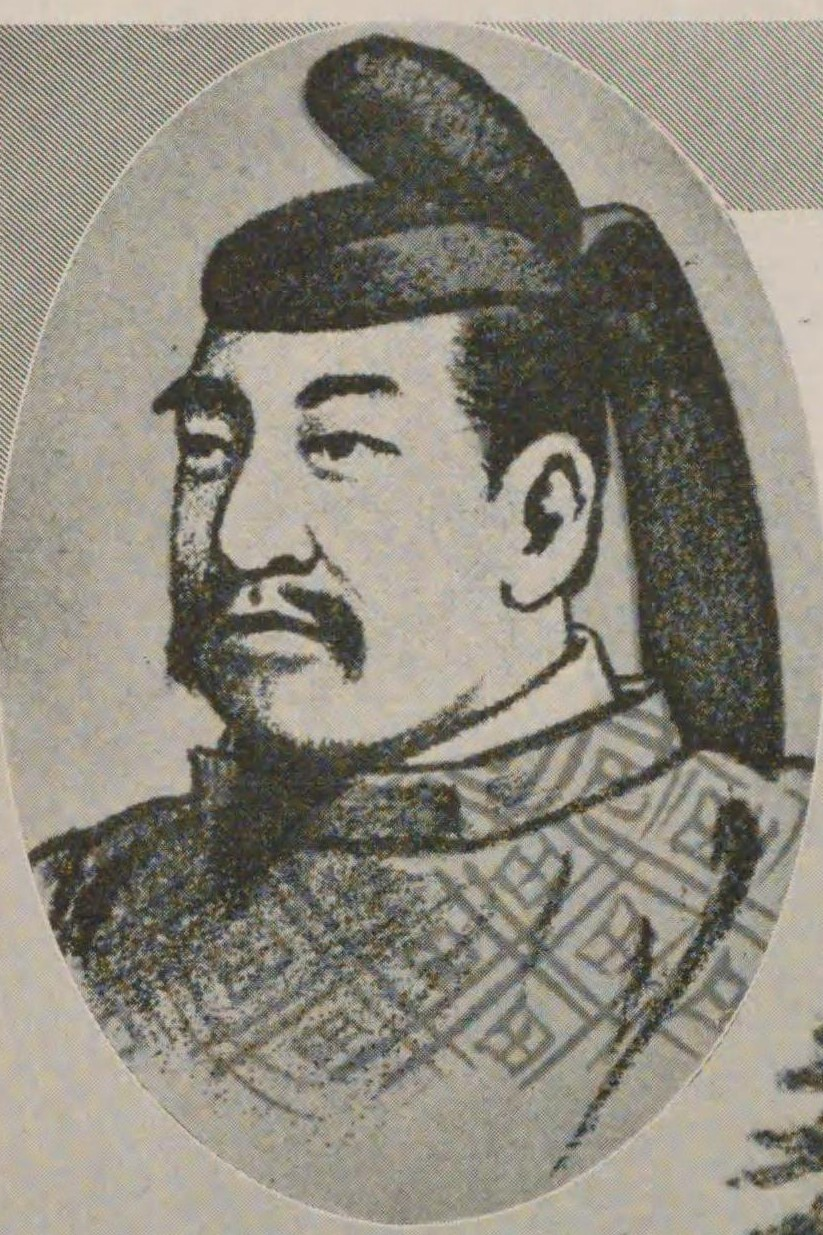

Emperor of Japan
- Reign: 806–809
- Enthronement: April 9, 806
- Predecessor: Kanmu
- Successor: Saga
- Born: Ate (安殿); 773
- Died: August 5, 824 (aged 50–51); Heijō-kyō (Nara)
- Burial: Yamamomo no misasagi (楊梅陵) (Nara)
- Spouse: Fujiwara no Tarashiko/Taishi
- Issue: Prince Abo; Prince Takaoka; Prince Kose; Princess Kamitsukeno; Princess Isonokami; Princess Ōhara; Princess Enu
Posthumous name
- Tsuigō: Emperor Heizei (平城天皇) Japanese-style shigō: Yamato-neko-ameoshikuni-takahiko no Sumeramikoto (日本根子天推国高彦天皇)
- House: Imperial House of Japan
- Father: Emperor Kanmu
- Mother: Fujiwara no Otomuro

Emperor Heizei (平城天皇, Heizei-tennō; 773 – August 5, 824), also known as Heijō-tennō, was the 51st emperor of Japan, according to the traditional order of succession. Heizei's reign lasted from 806 to 809.

== Traditional narrative ==
Heizei was the eldest son of the Emperor Kanmu and empress Fujiwara no Otomuro. Heizei had three empresses and seven sons and daughters.

Heizei is traditionally venerated at his tomb; the Imperial Household Agency designates Yamamomo no Misasagi (楊梅陵, Yamamomo Imperial Mausoleum), in Nara, as the location of Heizei's mausoleum. The site is publicly accessible. Although one of the largest kofun monuments in Japan, archaeological investigations in 1962–1963 indicate that it was constructed in the early 5th century, and that portions of it were destroyed during the construction of Heijō-kyō, calling into question the designation by the Imperial Household Agency.

=== Events of Heizei's life ===
Before he ascended to the throne, his liaison with Fujiwara no Kusuko, the mother of his one consort, caused a scandal. Because of this scandal his father considered depriving him of the rank of crown prince.

- 785: (Enryaku 4, 11th month): Heizei was appointed Crown Prince at the age of 12.
- April 9, 806 (Daidō 1, 17th day of the 3rd month): In the 25th year of Emperor Kanmu's reign, he died; and despite an ensuing dispute over who should follow him as sovereign, contemporary scholars then construed that the succession (senso) was received by his son. Shortly thereafter, Emperor Heizei is said to have acceded to the throne (sokui).

His title Heizei was derived from the official name of the capital in Nara, Heizei Kyō.

During Heizei's reign, the bodyguards were reorganized; the existing Imperial Bodyguards became the Left Imperial Bodyguards, while the Middle Bodyguards became the Right Imperial Bodyguards. Both sides were given a new Senior Commander; at this time Heizei appointed Sakanoue no Tamuramaro (758–811) as Senior Commander of the Imperial Bodyguards of the Right. Under Emperor Kanmu, Tamuramaro had been appointed as shōgun of a military expedition against the Emishi.

- 809 (Daidō 4, 1st month): After a reign of four years, Heizei fell ill; and fearing that he would not survive, Heizei abdicated in favor of his younger brother, who would later come to be known as Emperor Saga. After abdicating, Heizei moved to Nara and was henceforth known as Nara no Mikado, the "Emperor of Nara".
- May 18, 809 (Daidō 4, 1st day of the 4th month): Emperor Saga was enthroned at age 24.
- 810 (Kōnin 1): In Heizei's name, the former emperor's ambitious third wife, Fujiwara no Kusuko (藤原薬子), and her brother Nakanari organized an attempted rebellion, but their forces were defeated. Kusuko died in poison and her brother was executed. Heizei took the tonsure and became a Buddhist monk.
- August 5, 824 (Tenchō 1, 7th day of the 7th month): Heizei died at age 51, 14 years after he had abdicated due to illness.

=== Era of Heizei's reign ===
The years of Heizei's reign are encompassed within one era name (nengō).

- Daidō (806–810)

== Kugyō ==
Kugyō (公卿) is a collective term for the very few most powerful men attached to the court of the Emperor of Japan in pre-Meiji eras.

In general, this elite group included only three to four men at a time. These were hereditary courtiers whose experience and background would have brought them to the pinnacle of a life's career. During Heizei's reign, this apex of the Daijō-kan included:

- Sadaijin (not appointed)
- Udaijin, Miwa-no-Oh or Miwa-no-Ohkimi (神王), 798–806.
- Udaijin, Fujiwara no Uchimaro (藤原内麿), 806–812.
- Naidaijin
- Dainagon, Fujiwara no Otomo (藤原雄友), 806–807

When the daughter of a chūnagon became the favored consort of the Crown Prince Ate (later known as Heizei-tennō), her father's power and position in court was affected. Kanmu disapproved of Fujiwara no Kusuko (藤原薬子, d. 810), former wife of Fujiwara no Tadanushi; and Kanmu had her removed from his son's household. After Kanmu died, Heizei restored this one-time favorite as part of his household; and this distinction had consequences.

- Chūnagon, Fujiwara no Tadanushi

== Consorts and children ==
- Empress (posthumously elevated Kōgō): Fujiwara no Tarashiko/Taishi (藤原帯子; d.794), Fujiwara no Momokawa’s daughter
- Consort (Hi): Imperial Princess Asahara (朝原内親王; 779–817), Emperor Kanmu’s daughter
- Consort (Hi): Imperial Princess Ōyake (大宅内親王; d.849), Emperor Kanmu’s daughter
- Consort (Hi):: Imperial Princess Kan'nabi (甘南美内親王; 800–817), Emperor Kanmu’s daughter
- Shōshi Court lady (Naishi-no-kami): Fujiwara no Kusuko (藤原薬子; d. 810), former wife of Chūnagon Fujiwara no Tadanushi and Fujiwara no Tanetsugu's daughter
- Consort (Hi):: Fujiwara Tadanushi's daughter
- Court lady: Ise no Tsuguko (伊勢継子; 772–812), Ise no Ōna's daughter
  - Third Prince: Imperial Prince Takaoka (高丘親王; 799–865), the Crown Prince in 809 (deposed in 810)
  - Fourth prince: Imperial Prince Kose (巨勢親王; d. 882)
  - Imperial Princess Kamitsukeno (上毛野内親王; d. 842)
  - Imperial Princess Isonokami (石上内親王; d. 846)
  - Third princess: Imperial Princess Ōhara (大原内親王; d. 863), 14th Saiō in Ise Shrine (806–809)
- Court lady: Fujii no Fujiko/Tōshi (葛井藤子), Fujii no Michiyori's daughter
  - First Prince: Imperial Prince Abo (阿保親王)
- Court lady: Ki no Iokazu (紀魚員), Ki no Kotsuo's daughter
  - Imperial Princess Enu (叡努内親王; d. 835)

== Ancestry ==
Ancestors of Emperor Heizei

8. Prince Shiki (d. 716)
4. Emperor Kōnin (709–782)
9. Ki no Tochihime (d. 709)
2. Emperor Kanmu (737-806)
10. Yamato no Ototsugu
5. Takano no Niigasa (c. 720-790)
11. Haji no Maimo
1. Emperor Heizei
12. Fujiwara no Umakai (694-737)
6. Fujiwara no Yoshitsugu (716-777)
13. Isonokami no Kunimina no Ōtoji
3. Fujiwara no Otomuro (760-790)
14. Abe no Nukamushi
7. Abe no Komina (d. 784)

== See also ==
- Emperor of Japan
- List of Emperors of Japan
- Imperial cult

== Notes ==
Japanese Imperial kamon — a stylized chrysanthemum blossom

Regnal titles
Preceded by Emperor Kanmu	Emperor of Japan: Heizei; 806–809	Succeeded by Emperor Saga
