= Emperor Saga =

Emperor of Japan from 809 to 823

Emperor Saga 嵯峨天皇
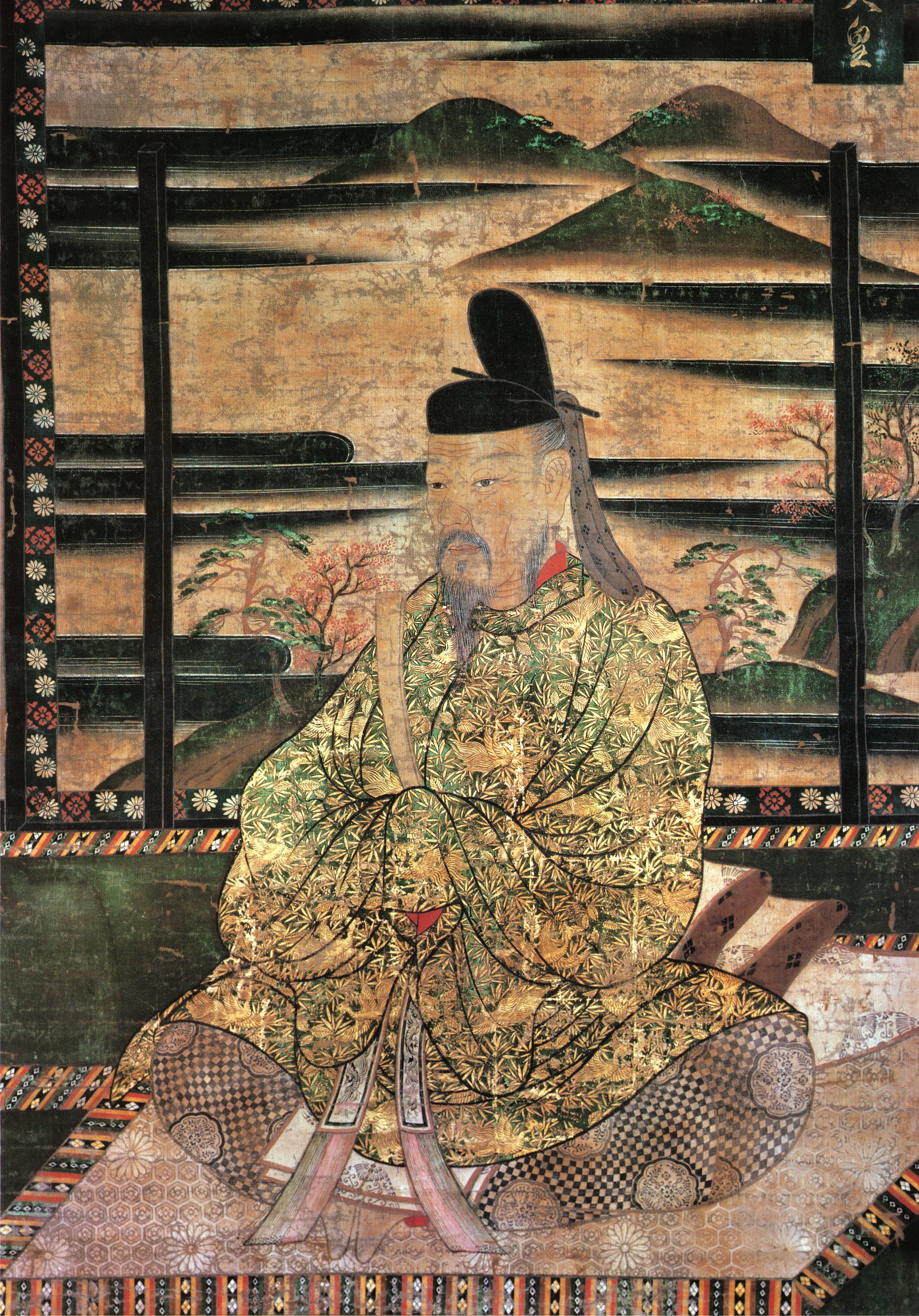
- Portrait from the Kōshitsu no shihō, 14th century

Emperor of Japan
- Reign: May 18, 809 – May 29, 823
- Enthronement: May 30, 809
- Predecessor: Heizei
- Successor: Junna
- Born: Kamino (神野); October 3, 784
- Died: August 24, 842 (aged 57); Heian Kyō (Kyōto) Saga-in temple (嵯峨院)
- Burial: Saga no yamanoe no misasagi (嵯峨山上陵)
- Spouse: Tachibana no Kachiko
- Issue more...: Emperor Ninmyō; Minamoto no Makoto; Minamoto no Tōru
Posthumous name
- Tsuigō: Emperor Saga (嵯峨天皇)
- House: Imperial House of Japan
- Father: Emperor Kanmu
- Mother: Fujiwara no Otomuro

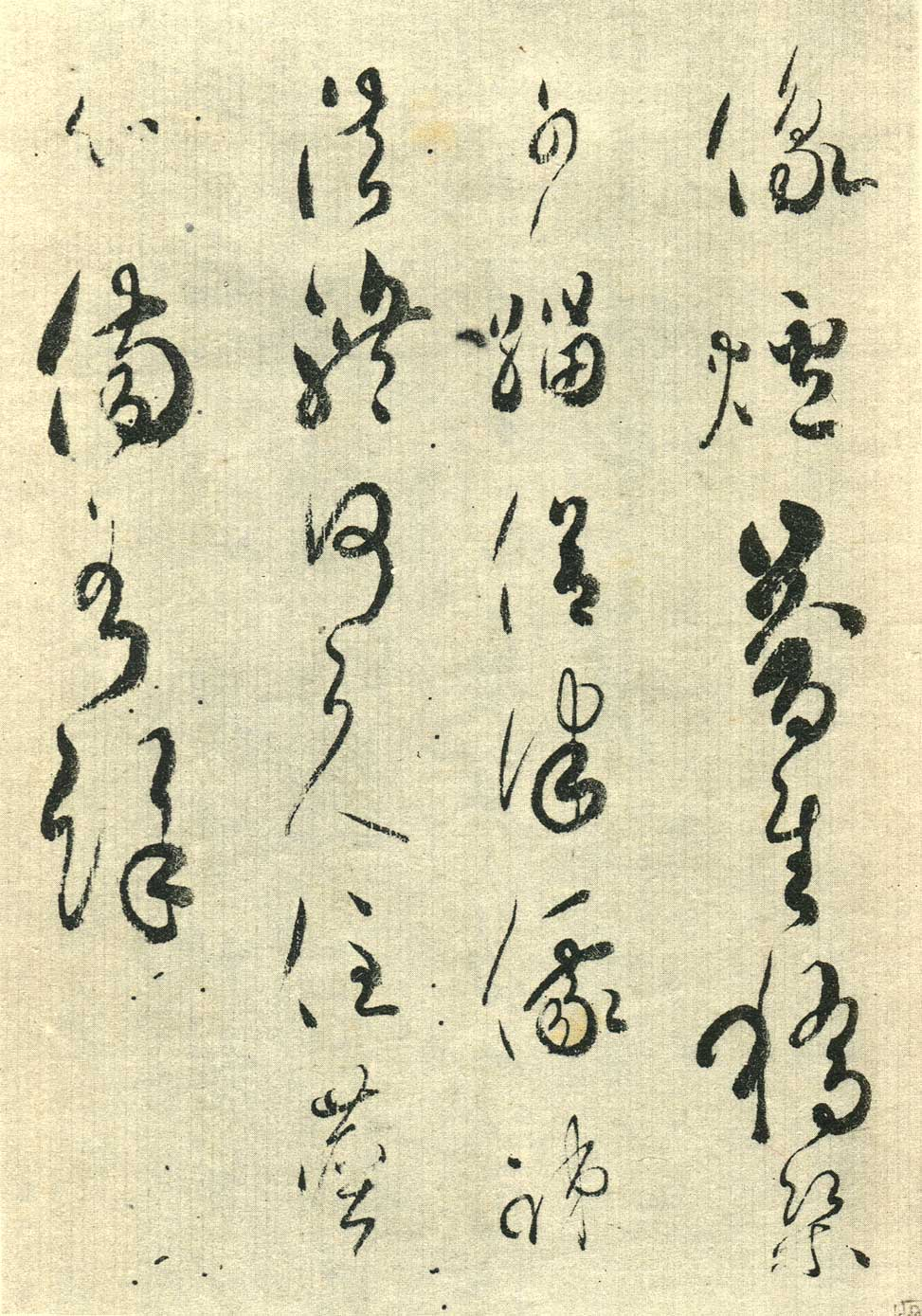
Cry for noble Saichō (哭最澄上人), which was written by Emperor Saga for Saichō's death. Saga was a scholar of the Chinese classics. He was also renowned as a skillful calligrapher. Chinese calligraphic influence was weakened during the Heian period; this text was an example of the different way it was evolving in Japan.

Emperor Saga (嵯峨天皇, Saga-tennō; October 3, 784 – August 24, 842) was the 52nd emperor of Japan, according to the traditional order of succession. Saga's reign lasted from 809 to 823.

== Biography ==
Saga was born in 784 as the second son of Emperor Kanmu and Fujiwara no Otomuro. His personal name was Kamino (神野), taken from the birthplace of his wet nurse Kamino Sukune, as was the common practice of the time. He came of age in 799 and had good relations with his father, Emperor Kanmu, unlike his elder brother, the future Emperor Heizei. In 806, upon the accession of his older brother as Emperor Heizei, he was appointed Crown Prince. Emperor Heizei already had two sons, Prince Takaoka and Prince Abo, and the decision to appoint his younger brother as Crown Prince was made by the newly-retired Emperor Kanmu. He ascended the throne in 809 upon the abdication of Emperor Heizei, and appointed Prince Takaoka, Emperor Heizei's son and his nephew, as Crown Prince.

In 810, the "Kusuko Incident" occurred, in which the retired Emperor Heizei attempted to regain the throne. As a result, Prince Takaoka was deposed, but his half-brother, Prince Ōtomo (later Emperor Junna), was appointed Crown Prince. The retired Emperor Heizei continued to receive the title and honors of Grand Emperor after this incident. Following this incident, Emperor Saga established the Kebiishi, a police force responsible for maintaining order and conducting trials within the capital. He established the Kurōdo-dokoro (Chamberlain's Office) to ensure that male officials cooperated with the Emperor to prevent unrest caused by female court officials. Kose no Notari and Fujiwara no Fuyutsugu were appointed as Kurōdo-gashira (Head of the Chamberlain's Office). In 812, he entrusted government affairs to officials, primarily Fujiwara no Sonohito, who became Minister of the Right, and devoted himself to cultural affairs, such as holding poetry banquets. In 818, he renamed the twelve gates of Heian-kyō to Tang-style names. and adopted Tang-style court ceremonies.

He then ruled peacefully for approximately 14 years, during a period of flourishing court culture. He excelled in Chinese poetry and calligraphy, and is counted among the Three Great Calligraphers along with Kūkai and Tachibana no Hayanari. He held the first imperial poetry competitions (naien). His calligraphic works include the "Kōjō Kaichō" housed at Enryaku-ji. He is also said to be the founder of the Saga Go-ryū school of ikebana flower arrangement. In April of the 6th year of the Kōnin era (815), while on an imperial visit to Shiga County in Ōmi Province, he stopped his palanquin at Bonshaku-ji and is said to have drunk tea brewed by the monk Eichū, who had returned from Tang China.

Emperor Saga had many sons and daughters. To avoid financial strain, in May 814, he initiated "dynastic shedding", by granting the surname "Minamoto" to many of his children, starting with his seventh son—Minamoto no Makoto, demoting them to commoner status One of these demoted princes was Minamoto no Tōru, is thought to be an inspiration for the protagonist of the novel The Tale of Genji.

In 815, he deposed his half-sister, Princess Takatsu, who had been his consort (the exact date is unknown), and in the same month, he appointed Tachibana no Kachiko as Empress.

In 818, the Kōnin Code was issued. Around this time, agricultural production was in a severe slump, and financial difficulties were serious. As a countermeasure, the law on permanent private ownership of reclaimed land was revised to ease restrictions on large-scale land ownership, promoting the development of uncultivated land, and publicly owned and imperially designated fields were established.

In 823, he bestowed the temple of Tō-ji upon Kūkai. The previous year, he had recognized Saichō's long-cherished wish to establish an ordination platform.

Also in 823, Saga abdicated in favor of Prince Ōtomo (later Emperor Junna), becoming a retired emperor and appointing his son, Prince Masayoshi (later Emperor Ninmyō), as crown prince. At this time, Fujiwara no Fuyutsugu, who advocated for financial austerity to maintain the Ritsuryō system, and a close confidant of Emperor Saga, opposed the abdication, arguing that having another retired emperor in addition to Emperor Heizei would be a significant financial burden amidst a series of poor harvests. However, Emperor Saga proceeded with the abdication, possibly to defy the custom that the eldest son of the emperor would, in principle, succeed to the throne, and instead to allow another son of Emperor Kanmu to inherit the throne. His abdication at a relatively young age was also considered to be out of consideration for his half-brother, Prince Ōtomo who was the same age.

After the abdication, the nature of the retired emperor changed significantly. Under the Ritsuryō system, the retired emperor possessed political powers equal to those of the emperor and held the position of co-regent. However, Emperor Saga declined the official title of retired emperor, and refused further participation in national politics. The only known instance of Emperor Saga's interference in national politics is the recall of those exiled in connection with the Kusuko Incident in 824, the month after the death of Emperor Heizei.

In 833, ex-Emperor Saga had a new palace built at Saga-in (later Daikaku-ji), a detached palace outside Kyoto that had been established during his reign. He moved there with Empress Dowager Kachiko. The garden of the palace features Ōsawa Pond, is one of the oldest Japanese garden ponds to survive from the Heian period,which was modeled after Lake Dongting in China.

Ex-Emperor Saga died in 842 at the age of 57. His is known to have left a will quoting Chinese classics in which he stated his desire for a simple funeral, unlike previous emperors and retired emperors.

== Emperor Saga's tomb ==
Emperor Saga is traditionally venerated at a location the Imperial Household Agency designates Saganoyamanoe no Misasagi (嵯峨山上陵, Saganoyamanoe Imperial Mausoleum), in Ukyō-ku, Kyoto. The tomb is a 38-meter diameter circular mound located on the summit of Asaharayama (also known Gobyōyama, 190 meters), facing southeast. Per the Shoku Nihon Koki. The Emperor repeatedly requested a simple funeral, and left instructions that his grave should be in a "remote, barren land north of the mountains," without a seal or mound of earth, simply leveled, with a hole large enough to hold the coffin, without trees planted, left to grow naturally, and without any rituals being performed there for a long time. Accordingly, the funeral was completed on the same day of his death, and his remains were buried in a remote mountain area to the northwest of Daikaku-ji. For this reason, it is not recorded in Engishiki, and from the Kamakura period onward, the location became unknown. The stone pagodas within Nison-in and Seiryō-ji (both in Ukyō-ku, Kyoto) were traditionally considered to be his tomb. In the late Edo period, in 1808, the Confucian scholar Gamō Kunpei (1768-1813) designated the current location as Emperor Saga's tomb, based on seven large stones discovered on the mountainside. The tomb was restored in 1862-1863 and surrounded by stone walls and wooden fences; however, there is no physical or documentary evidence to support the supposition that this is actually his tomb.

=== Events of Saga's life ===
- 806 Saga became the crown prince at age 21.
- June 17, 809 (Daidō 4, 1st day of the 4th month): In the 4th year of Emperor Heizei's reign, he fell ill and abdicated; and the succession (senso) was received by Kanmu's second son Saga, the eldest son having become a Buddhist priest. Shortly thereafter, Emperor Saga is said to have acceded to the throne (sokui).

Soon after his enthronement, Saga himself took ill. At the time the retired Heizei had quarreled with his brother over the ideal location of the court, the latter preferring the Heian capital, while the former was convinced that a shift back to the Nara plain was necessary, and Heizei, exploiting Saga's weakened health, seized the opportunity to foment a rebellion, known historically as the Kusuko Incident; however, forces loyal to Emperor Saga, led by taishōgun Sakanoue no Tamuramaro, quickly defeated the Heizei rebels which thus limited the adverse consequences which would have followed any broader conflict. This same Tamuramaro is remembered in Aomori's annual Nebuta Matsuri which feature a number of gigantic, specially-constructed, illuminated paper floats. These great lantern-structures are colorfully painted with mythical figures; and teams of men carry them through the streets as crowds shout encouragement. This early ninth century military leader is commemorated in this way because he is said to have ordered huge illuminated lanterns to be placed at the top of hills; and when the curious Emishi approached these bright lights to investigate, they were captured and subdued by Tamuramaro's men.

- August 24, 842 (Jōwa 9, 15th day of the 7th month): Saga died at the age of 57.

=== Eras of Saga's reign ===
The years of Saga's reign are more specifically identified by more than one era name (nengō).

- Daidō (806–810)
- Kōnin (810–824)

== Kugyō ==
Kugyō (公卿) is a collective term for the very few most powerful men attached to the court of the Emperor of Japan in pre-Meiji eras. In general, this elite group included only three to four men at a time. These were hereditary courtiers whose experience and background would have brought them to the pinnacle of a life's career. During Saga's reign (809–823), this kugyō included:

- Sadaijin
- Udaijin, Fujiwara no Uchimaro (藤原内麿), 806–812.
- Udaijin, Fujiwara no Sonohito (藤原園人), 812–818.
- Udaijin, Fujiwara no Fuyutsugu (藤原冬嗣), 821–825.
- Udaijin, Tachibana no Ujikimi.
- Naidaijin
- Dainagon

== Consorts and children ==
Saga had 49 children with at least 30 different women. Many of the children received the surname Minamoto, thereby removing them from royal succession.

- Empress: Tachibana no Kachiko (橘嘉智子), also known as Empress Danrin (檀林皇后, Danrin-kōgō), Tachibana no Kiyotomo's daughter.
  - Second Son: Imperial Prince Masara (正良親王) later Emperor Ninmyō
  - Imperial Princess Seishi (正子内親王; 810–879), married to Emperor Junna
  - Imperial Princess Hideko (秀子内親王; d. 850)
  - Imperial Prince Hidera (秀良親王; 817–895)
  - Imperial Princess Toshiko (俊子内親王; d. 826)
  - Fifth Daughter: Imperial Princess Yoshiko (芳子内親王; d. 836)
  - Imperial Princess Shigeko (繁子内親王; d. 865)
- Hi (deposed): Imperial Princess Takatsu (高津内親王; d. 841), Emperor Kanmu’s daughter
  - Second Prince: Imperial Prince Nariyoshi (業良親王; d. 868)
  - Imperial Princess Nariko (業子内親王; d. 815)
- Hi: Tajihi no Takako (多治比高子; 787–825), Tajihi no Ujimori's daughter
- Bunin: Fujiwara no Onatsu (藤原緒夏; d. 855), Fujiwara no Uchimaro's daughter
- Court lady (Naishi-no-kami): Kudara no Kyomyō (百済王慶命; d. 849), Kudara no Kyōshun's daughter
  - Minamoto no Yoshihime (源善姫; b. 814)
  - Minamoto no Sadamu (源定; 815–863)
  - Minamoto no Wakahime (源若姫)
  - Minamoto no Shizumu (源鎮; 824–881)
- Nyōgo: Kudara no Kimyō (百済貴命; d. 851), Kudara no Shuntetsu's daughter
  - Imperial Prince Motora (基良親王; d. 831)
  - Fourth Son: Imperial Prince Tadara (忠良親王; 819–876)
  - Imperial Princess Motoko (基子内親王; d. 831)
- Nyōgo: Ōhara no Kiyoko (大原浄子; d. 841), Ōhara no Ietsugu's daughter
  - Tenth Daughter: Imperial Princess Ninshi (仁子内親王; d. 889), 15th Saiō in Ise Shrine 809–823
- Koui: Iidaka no Yakatoji (飯高宅刀自), Iidaka Gakuashi
  - Minamoto no Tokiwa (源常; 812–854)
  - Minamoto no Akira (源明; 814–852/853)
- Koui: Akishino no Koko (秋篠高子/康子), Akishino no Yasuhito's daughter
  - Minamoto no Kiyoshi (源清)
- Koui: Yamada no Chikako (山田近子)
  - Minamoto no Hiraku(?) (源啓; 829–869)
  - Minamoto no Mituhime (源密姫)
- Nyōgo: Princess Katano (交野女王), Prince Yamaguchi's daughter
  - Eighth Daughter: Imperial Princess Uchiko (有智子内親王; 807–847), 1st Saiin in Kamo Shrine 810–831
- Court lady: Takashina no Kawako (高階河子), Takashina no Kiyoshina's daughter
  - Imperial Princess Sōshi (宗子内親王; d. 854)
- Court lady: Hiroi no Otona's daughter
  - Seventh Son: Minamoto no Makoto (源信)
- Court lady: Fuse no Musashiko (布勢武蔵子)
  - Minamoto no Sadahime (源貞姫; 810–880)
  - Minamoto no Hashihime (源端姫)
- Court lady: Kamitsukeno clan's daughter
  - Minamoto no Hiromu (源弘; 812–863)
- Court lady: Abe no Yanatsu's daughter
  - Minamoto no Yutaka (源寛; 813–876)
- Court lady: Kasa no Tsugiko (笠継子), Kasa no Nakamori's daughter
  - Minamoto no Ikeru (源生; 821–872)
- Court lady: Awata clan's daughter
  - Minamoto no Yasushi (源安; 822–853)
- Court lady: Ōhara no Matako (大原全子), Ōhara no Mamuro's daughter
  - Minamoto no Tōru (源融), Sadaijin
  - Minamoto no Tsutomu (源勤; 824–881)
  - Minamoto no Mitsuhime (源盈姫)
- Court lady: Ki clan's daughter
  - Minamoto no Sarahime (源更姫)
- Court lady: Kura no Kageko (内蔵影子)
  - Minamoto no Kamihime (源神姫)
  - Minamoto no Katahime (源容姫)
  - Minamoto no Agahime (源吾姫)
- Court lady: Kannabi no Iseko (甘南備伊勢子)
  - Minamoto no Koehime (源声姫)
- Court lady: Fun'ya no Fumiko (文屋文子), Fun'ya no Kugamaro's daughter
  - Imperial Princess Junshi (純子内親王; d. 863)
  - Imperial Princess Seishi (斉子内親王; d. 853), married to Prince Fujii (son of Emperor Kanmu)
  - Prince Atsushi (淳王)
- Court lady: Tanaka clan's daughter
  - Minamoto no Sumu(?) (源澄)
- Court lady: Koreyoshi no Sadamichi's daughter
  - Minamoto no Masaru (源勝)
- Court lady: Ōnakatomi no Mineko (大中臣峯子)
- Court lady: Tachibana no Haruko (橘春子)
- Court lady: Nagaoka no Okanari's daughter
  - Minamoto no Sakashi(?) (源賢)
- Court lady (Nyoju): Taima no Osadamaro's daughter
  - Minamoto no Kiyohime (源潔姫; 810–856), married to Fujiwara no Yoshifusa
  - Minamoto no Matahime (源全姫; 812–882), Naishi-no-kami (尚侍)
- Lady-in-waiting: Sugawara Kanshi (菅原閑子)
- (from unknown women)
  - Minamoto no Tsugu (?) (源継)
  - Minamoto no Yoshihime (源良姫)
  - Minamoto no Toshihime (源年姫)

== Ancestry ==
Ancestors of Emperor Saga

8. Prince Shiki (d. 716)
4. Emperor Kōnin (709–782)
9. Ki no Tochihime (d. 709)
2. Emperor Kanmu (737-806)
10. Yamato no Ototsugu
5. Takano no Niigasa (c. 720-790)
11. Haji no Maimo
1. Emperor Saga
12. Fujiwara no Umakai (694-737)
6. Fujiwara no Yoshitsugu (716-777)
13. Isonokami no Kunimina no Ōtoji
3. Fujiwara no Otomuro (760-790)
14. Abe no Nukamushi
7. Abe no Komina (d. 784)

== See also ==
- Emperor Go-Saga
- Imperial cult

== Notes ==
Japanese Imperial kamon — a stylized chrysanthemum blossom

Regnal titles
Preceded by Emperor Heizei	Emperor of Japan: Saga; 809–823	Succeeded by Emperor Junna
