= Fujiwara no Suekane =

Warlord of the late Heian period

Fujiwara no Suekane 藤原季兼
- Born: 1044
- Died: November 6, 1101 (aged 56–57)
- Other names: Mikawa Shirō Taifu
- Occupations: nobleman, feudal lord
- Children: Fujiwara no Suenori
- Father: Fujiwara no Sanenori

Fujiwara no Suekane (藤原 季兼, 1044 – November 6, 1101) was a Japanese nobleman and feudal lord of the late Heian period. He served as acting governor of Owari Province and district governor of Nukata. He is also known as Mikawa Shirō Taifu.

== Life ==
He was born in 1044 as the son of Fujiwara no Sanenori, a courtier and Governor of Suruga Province, and the daughter of Ono Sukemichi, Governor of Iki Province. He was a member of the powerful Fujiwara clan's Nanke House through the Fujiwara no Sadatsugu lineage.

He ruled Nukata in Mikawa Province as its development lord (kaihatsu ryōshu) while serving as a district governor (gunji). Suekane grew his political and military power within his territory to the extent that he did not need the protection of the governing families (kenmon), and had sufficient military power to control the territory. It is believed that he gained such a position by fighting against the kenmon, provincial governors (kokushi), and other regional government officials.

He later became the acting governor (mokudai) of Owari Province, and married Owari Motoko, the daughter of Owari Kazumoto, the High Priest of Atsuta Shrine. The two had a son, Fujiwara no Suenori. At the time, the Owari clan, the ruling shake family of the Atsuta Shrine, was at a feud with the local kokushi. To fulfil the duty as the local governor (daikan) of the kokushi, Suekane's marriage with the daughter of the ruling family of Owari Province was highly desirable. As a result of the marital relation between the two families, the diplomatic relations of the high priest family and the provincial governorate were repaired, and the expansion of shrine territory through the donation of governorate territory was proposed.

Suekane died on November 6, 1101, at the age of 58.

== Genealogy ==
Suekane is the great-grandfather of Minamoto no Yoritomo, the founder and first shogun of the Kamakura shogunate, through his granddaughter Yura Gozen who married Minamoto no Yoshitomo.

In 1114, Owari Kazumoto handed the position of High Priest of Atsuta Shrine over to Suekane's son Suenori. The Owari clan had established the Atsuta Shrine in 192, and held the position of High Priest since ancient times, passing it down from generation to generation, until Suenori of the Fujiwara clan succeeded the position. Since then, the Fujiwara clan became the head of Atsuta Shrine, while the Owari clan stepped down to the second highest position of adjutant chief priest (gongūji).

=== Family ===
- Father: Fujiwara no Sanenori
- Mother: Ono Sukemichi's daughter
- Wife: Owari Motoko
  - Son: Fujiwara no Suenori (1090 - 1155)

== See also ==
- Nanke (Fujiwara)
- Atsuta Shrine
