= Eisan-ji =

- 栄山寺
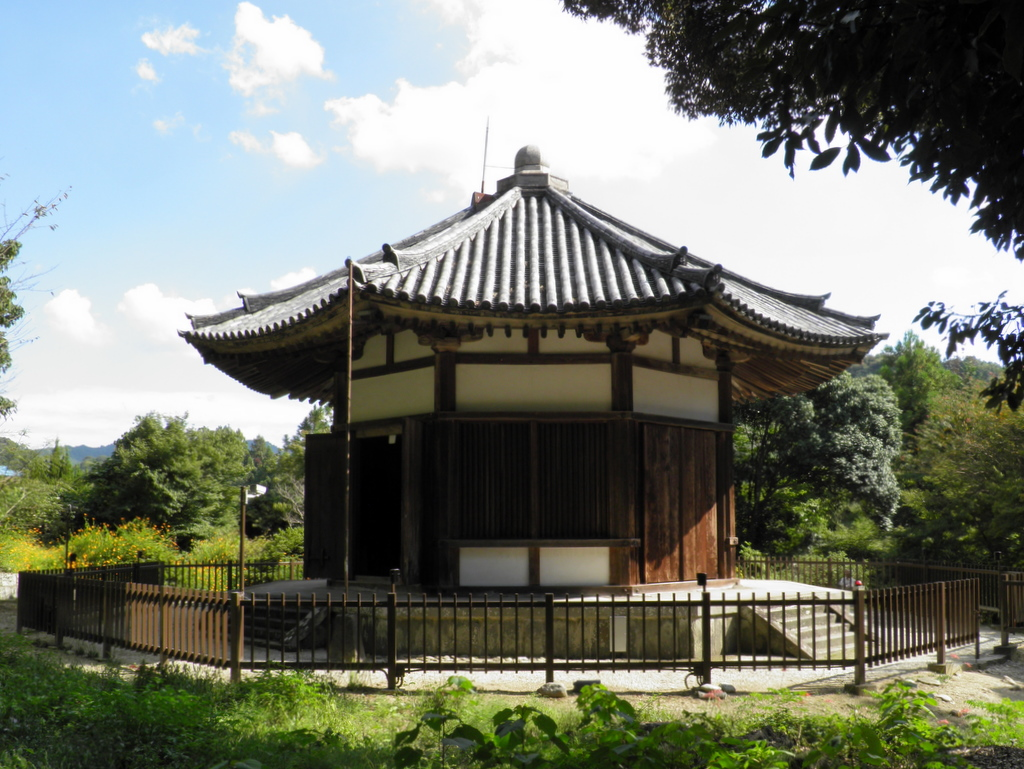
- Hondo

- Location within Nara Prefecture Location within Japan

Religion
- Affiliation: Buddhist
- Deity: Yakushi Nyorai
- Rite: Shingon
- Status: functional

Location
- Location: 503 Kojimachō, Gojō-shi, Nara 637-0031
- Country: Japan
- Coordinates: 34°21′21.4″N 135°43′14.4″E

Architecture
- Founder: Fujiwara no Muchimaro
- Completed: c.719
- National Treasure of Japan

Website
- Official website
- National Historic Site of Japan }

Eisan-ji (栄山寺) is a Buddhist temple located in the city of Gojō, Nara Prefecture, Japan. It belongs to the Shingon sect of Japanese Buddhism and its honzon is a statue of Yakushi Nyorai. The temple's full name is Gakushō-san Eisan-ji (学晶山 栄山寺).The temple is noted for its Nara period octagonal hall, which is designated as a National Treasure.

== Overview ==
The foundation of this temple is not well documented, but is claims to have been founded in 719 by Fujiwara no Muchimaro, the eldest son of Fujiwara no Fuhito. The temple was originally called Sakuyama-dera (前山寺). The existing octagonal hall was built by Muchimaro's son Nakamaro to pray for his father's soul after his death. Muchimaro's grave was originally located on Sahoyama (a hilly area in the northern part of Nara city), but in 760, it was reburied on the mountain north of Eizan-ji. The construction of the octagonal hall can be narrowed down to a period of five years between 760 and 764, when Nakamaro died. The Shōsōin documents include a document called "Zōendōshōchō" (Construction of the Round Hall) dated December 20, 763, and it is believed that this "round hall" refers to the octagonal hall at Eizan-ji. The temple is said to have been the training ground for En no Gyōja and was associated with Shugendō.

The temple later changed its name to Eizan-ji, became a branch temple of Kōfuku-ji, and flourished as the bodaiji of the Southern Fujiwara clan, whose founder was Muchimaro, until the Kamakura period. During the Nanboku-chō period, the Southern Court's Emperor Go-Murakami, Chōkei, and Go Kameyama had their temporary residence here, and the site of this Imperial Palace at Eizan-ji is designated as a National Historic Site.

By the end of the Sengoku period, only the Octagonal Hall had yet to burn down; the temple was abandoned for a time in the early Edo period. It later became a branch temple of Unryū-in in Kyoto, itself a branch temple of Sennyū-ji. It then became a branch temple of Gokoku-ji in Tokyo.

The temple is located approximately 2.3 kilometers east of Gojō Station on the JR West Wakayama Line

== Cultural Properties ==
=== National Treasures ===
- Octagonal Hall (八角堂), Nara period. This octagonal building is a rare example of architecture from the Nara period outside of Heijo-kyo and Ikaruga, and is also valuable in that the year of construction can be determined with some certainty. The exterior is octagonal in plan, but the interior is square, with four octagonal pillars around the sanctuary forming the structural axis. The roof was thatched before it was dismantled and repaired in 1911, but was restored to a tiled roof during the repair work. The jewel on the roof was restored during the repair work, but the remains of the stone jewel believed to be the original are preserved separately. Although the four interior pillars, the upper hinuki (roof tiles), and the colored paintings on the ceiling have been severely chipped, they are valuable relics of Nara period paintings and have been designated as Important Cultural Properties as "paintings" separate from the building. The pillars are decorated with figures of bodhisattvas playing musical instruments, and the hinuki (roof tiles) feature flying celestial beings and birds with human faces. The temple enshrines a seated statue of Dainichi Nyorai.
- Bonshō (梵鐘), Heian period. The inscription indicates that it was made in 917. It is known as one of the "Three Great Bells of the Heian Period" along with the bells at Jingo-ji Temple in Kyoto and Byodo-in in Uji, and has cast inscriptions on all four sides that are said to have been written by Ono no Michikaze and written by Sugawara no Michizane. It was donated by Fujiwara no Michiaki, the 5th generation grandson of Fujiwara no Muchimaro.

== National Important Cultural Properties ==
- Stone Seven-story Pagodall (石造七重塔), Heian period
- Wooden seated Yakushi Nyorai Statuell (木造薬師如来坐像), honzon of the temple, Muromachi period.
- Wooden standing Twelve Heavenly Generals Statuesll (木造十二神将立像), Muromachi period, dated 1454-1455
- Stone Tōrō Lanernll (石灯籠), Kamakura period, dated 1284
- Octoganal Hall paintingsll (角堂内陣装飾画), Nara period
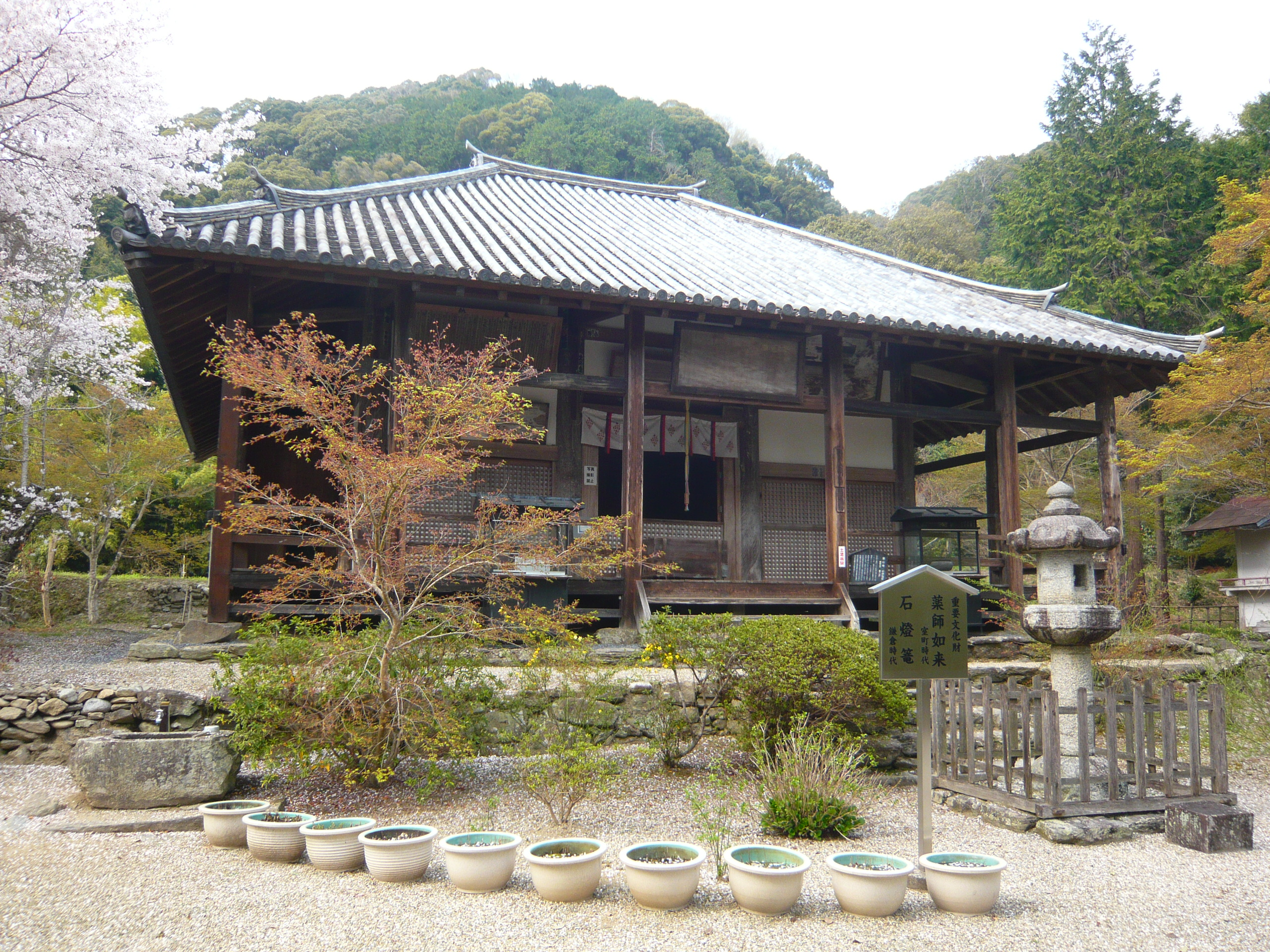
Hondo and stone lantern (ICP)

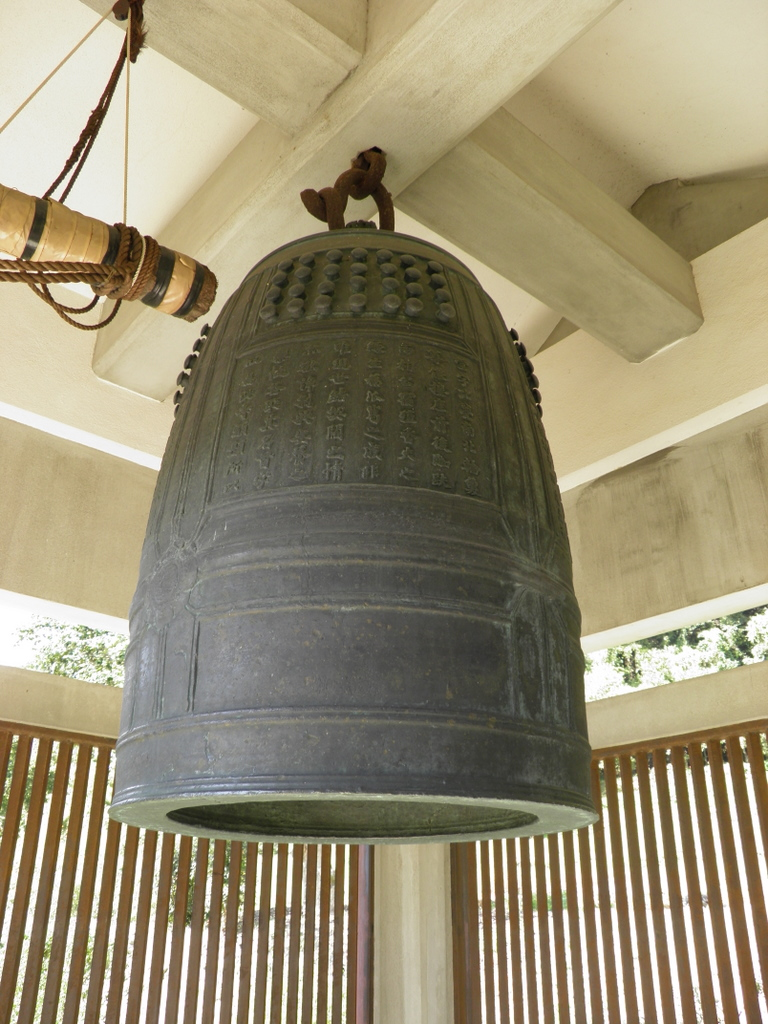
Bonshō (National Treasure)

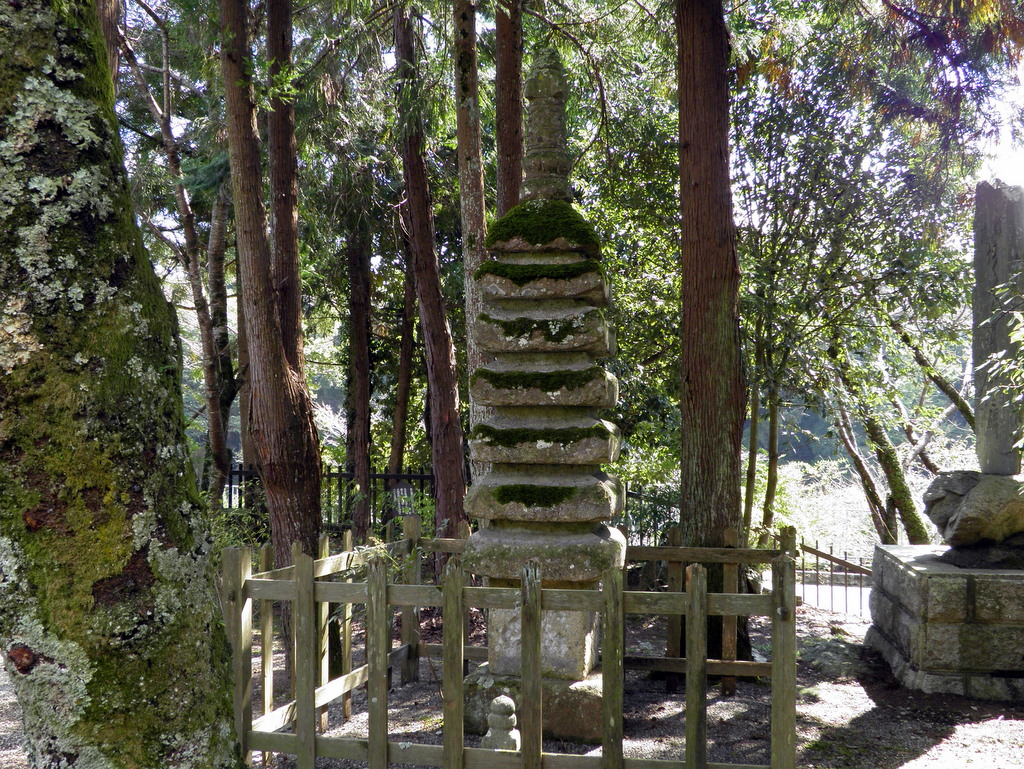
Stone pagoda (ICP)

== See also ==
- List of Historic Sites of Japan (Nara)
- List of National Treasures of Japan (temples)
- List of National Treasures of Japan (crafts: others)
