= Fujiwara no Matate =

Japanese court noble and statesman of the Nara period

Fujiwara no Matate 藤原真楯
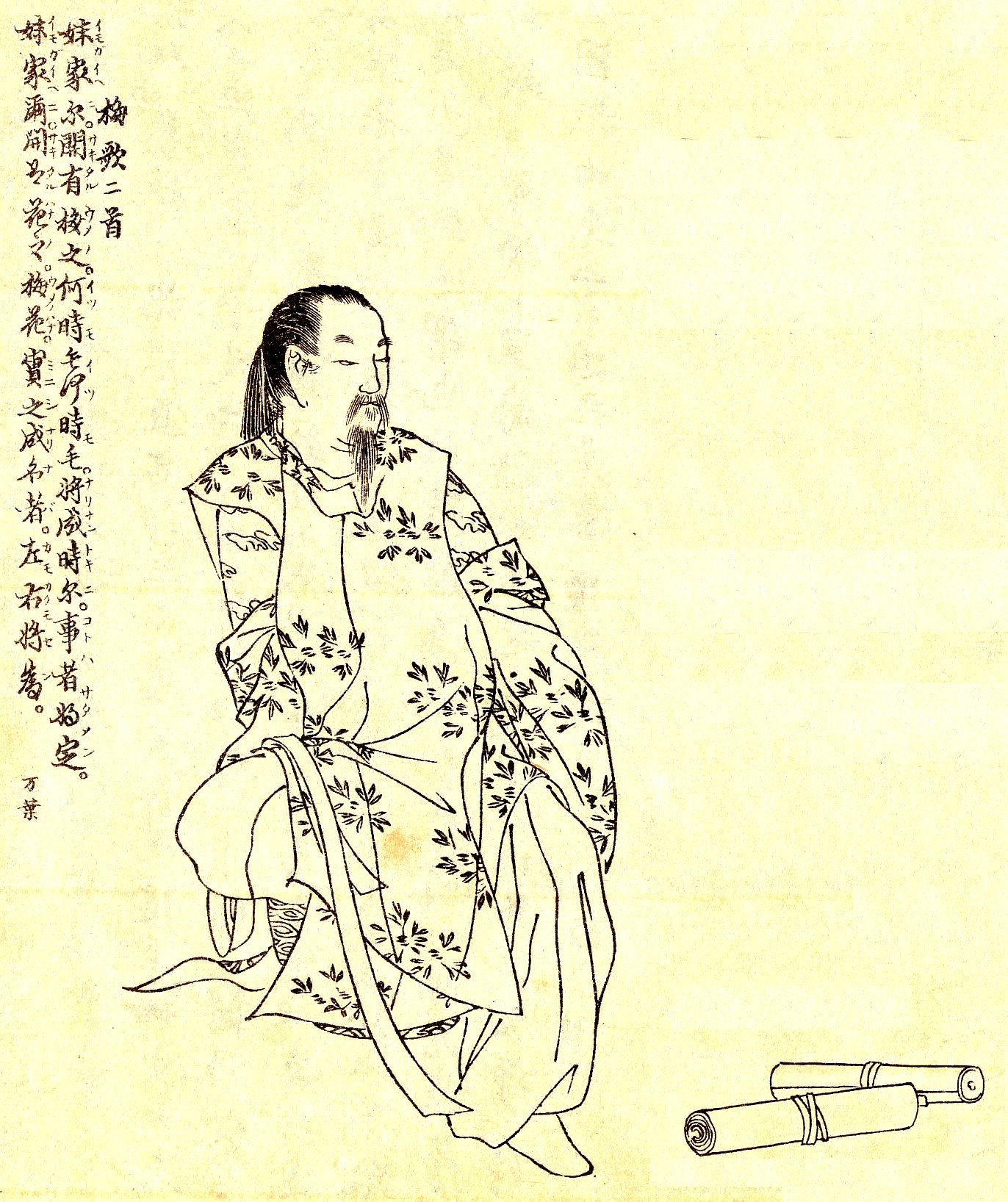
- Illustration by Kikuchi Yōsai, from "Zenken-Kojitsu" (pub. 1903)
- Born: 715
- Died: April 25, 766
- Family: Fujiwara Hokke
- Father: Fujiwara no Fusasaki

Fujiwara no Matate (藤原 真楯; 715 – April 25, 766) was a Japanese court noble and statesman of the Nara period. He was the third son of the founder of the Hokke House of the Fujiwara clan, the sangi Fujiwara no Fusasaki. He achieved the court rank of Senior Third Rank and the position of dainagon, and posthumously of daijō-daijin. His original name was Yatsuka (八束).

== Life ==
Emperor Shōmu recognized Yatsuka's abilities, and through his favor Yatsuka was rapidly promoted. He was raised in the year 740 from the rank of shō roku-i no jō (正六位上) to ju go-i no ge (従五位下) and then ju go-i no jō (従五位上), in 743 to shō go-i no jō (正五位上), and in 744 to ju shi-i no ge (従四位下). Shōmu specially entrusted him with duties related to the transmission of reports to and requests from the emperor. According to the Shoku Nihongi, Yatsuka was respected as exceptionally intelligent, incurring the jealousy of his cousin Fujiwara no Nakamaro. He is then said to have secluded himself in his home for a time, with his books for company. In 748 he was promoted to sangi, beating his one-year-older brother Nagate to the ranks of the kugyō.

In 756, shortly after the death of Emperor Shōmu, Nagate was promoted directly to chūnagon, overtaking Yatsuka. In 758, he supported Nakamaro's renaming of various government offices in the Chinese style of the Tang dynasty, and in 760 Yatsuka himself was granted the Tang-style name of Matate. He was steadily promoted to ju san-mi (従三位) in 760 and to chūnagon in 762. Also in this period, he held a farewell feast for Yōshōkei (揚承慶) of the fourth envoy expedition from Balhae to the court, which the latter greatly appreciated.

In Nakamaro's rebellion of 764, Matate supported the winning side of Empress Kōken, and was promoted to shō san-mi (正三位) and jutō-taishō and granted honors, second-class. In 766, Matate was promoted to dainagon, replacing Nagate, who had been promoted to udaijin. Two months later, though, Matate died at the age of 52. He was given the burial of a daijin (大臣), and posthumously promoted to daijō-daijin.

In Matate's day, the ruling power was Nakamaro, putting the Nanke in the predominant position. Moreover, Matate's older brother and head of house Nagate held a position at the daijin level. In the late Nara period, an equality between the clans was considered ideal, and for important positions to be held by father–son or sibling pairs still incurred criticism. For Matate too to be promoted as far as dainagon implies that this due in large part to his own ability. In later years, Matate's descendants included Fujiwara no Michinaga and Fujiwara no Yorimichi, who led the Fujiwara to the peak of their power.

Matate was a magnanimous man, with a talent for assisting emperors in their governance as a politician. Eight of his works are recorded in the Man'yōshū, including seven tanka and one sedoka. Notes in the same work suggest Matate had a personal friendship with Ōtomo no Yakamochi.

== Genealogy ==
- Father: Fujiwara no Fusasaki (藤原房前, 681-737)
- Mother: Muro no Ōkimi (牟漏女王, ?-746), daughter of Prince Minu (美努王).
  - Wife: daughter of Sami no Natemaro (佐味奈氐麻呂)
    - Son: Fujiwara no Managa (藤原真永)
    - Son: Fujiwara no Nagatsugu (藤原永継)
  - daughter of Abe no Obimaro (阿倍帯麻呂)
    - 3rd son: Fujiwara no Uchimaro (藤原内麻呂, 756-812)
