= Fujiwara no Nagate =

Japanese court noble and statesman of the Nara period

Fujiwara no Nagate 藤原永手
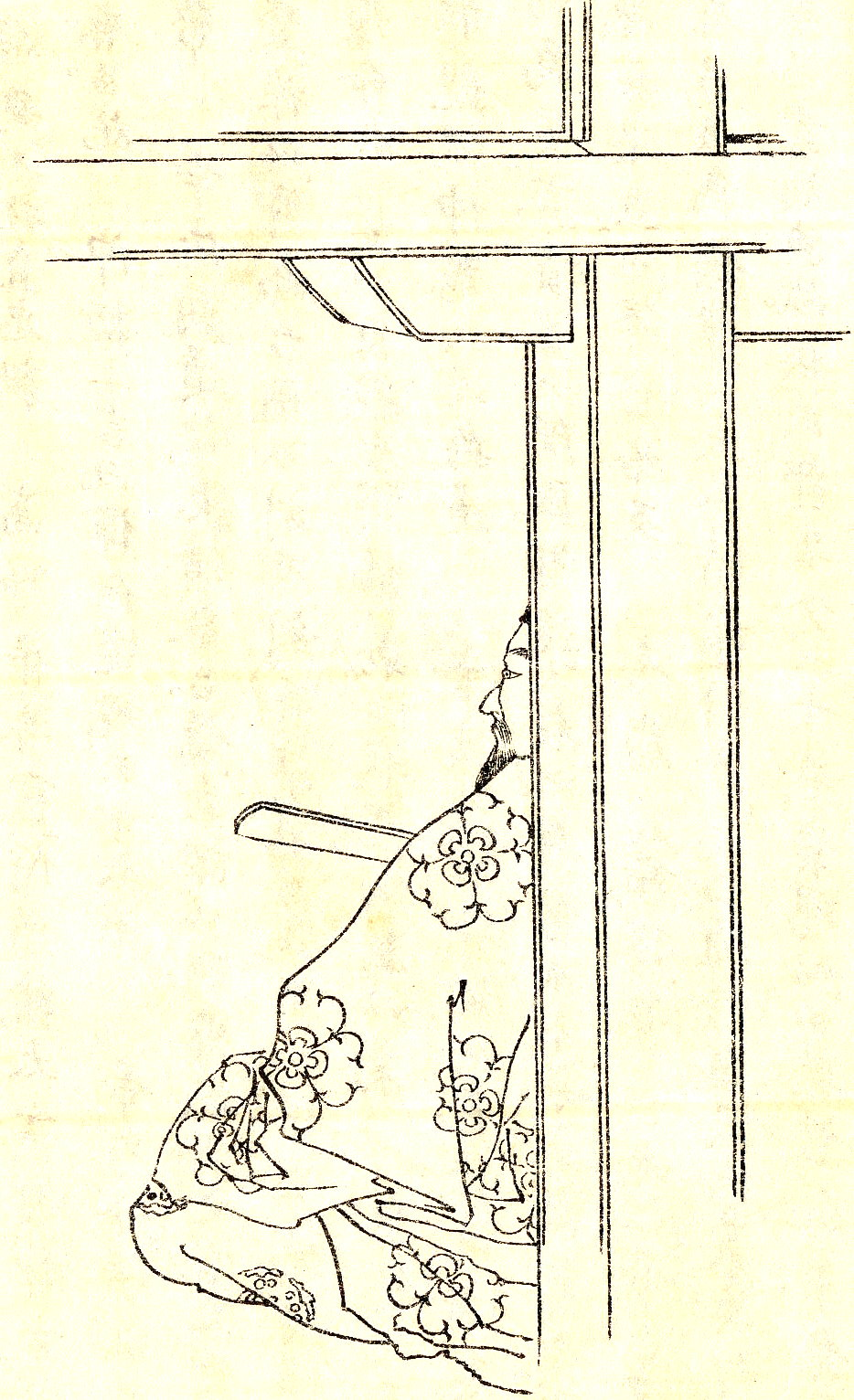
- Illustration by Kikuchi Yōsai, from "Zenken-Kojitsu" (pub. 1903)
- Born: 714
- Died: March 11, 771
- Family: Fujiwara Hokke
- Father: Fujiwara no Fusasaki

Fujiwara no Nagate (藤原永手; 714 – March 11, 771) was a Japanese court noble and statesman of the Nara period. He was the second son of the founder of the Hokke House of the Fujiwara clan, the sangi Fujiwara no Fusasaki. He achieved the court rank of Senior First Rank and the position of Minister of the Left, and posthumously of Chancellor of the Realm. He was also known as Nagaoka-Daijin (長岡大臣).

== Life ==
With the early death of his older brother Fujiwara no Torikai, Nagate became the effective leader of the Hokke. In 737, he was promoted from ju roku-i no ge (従六位下) to ju roku-i no jō (従六位上), but the emperor of the time, Shōmu, favored Nagate's younger brother Yatsuka. Nagate was not promoted again until 749, immediately before the emperor's abdication, when he gained the rank of ju shi-i no ge (従四位下).

He was more highly valued in the court of the new ruler Empress Kōken, where he was promoted to ju shi-i no jō (従四位上) in 750 and again in 754 to ju san-mi (従三位), marking him among the ranks of the kugyō. Immediately after the death of ex-emperor Shōmu in 756, Nagate was promoted directly to chūnagon, skipping sangi entirely.

On the other hand, he remained in conflict with his powerful relative Fujiwara no Nakamaro. After the disinheritance of Crown Prince Funado in 757, he joined with Fujiwara no Toyonari in supporting Prince Shioyaki as Empress Kōken's new heir, but Nakamaro's favored candidate Prince Ōi, the future Emperor Junnin, won out. In 758, Nagate was the only member of a committee to sit out a daijō-kan meeting called by Nakamaro. After 757, Nakamaro controlled the court, and this bad relationship left Nagate in an uncomfortable political position, despite his status as the third most powerful man in the Daijō-kan after Ishikawa no Toshitari and Fun'ya no Kiyomi.

In 764, Fujiwara no Nakamaro rebelled, and Nagate supported the side of Empress Kōken and Dōkyō. He was promoted to shō san-mi (正三位) and dainagon and conferred honors, second-class. After Dōkyō established his power, and after Toyonari's death in 765, Nagate held his position as the most powerful kugyō in the daijō-kan until his death. In 766 he was promoted to udaijin and then sadaijin, and obtained the rank of shō ni-i (正二位).

Empress Kōken died in 770, and in the ensuing dispute over the heir, Nagate supported Prince Shirakabe, the future Emperor Kōnin. He was rewarded for his efforts with a promotion to shō ichi-i (正一位) by the new sovereign.

Nagate died of sickness on March 11, 771, at the age of 58. He was posthumously granted the position of Daijō-daijin on the same day.

== Genealogy ==
- Father: Fujiwara no Fusasaki
- Mother: Muro no Ōkimi (daughter of Prince Minu)
- Wife: Ōno no Nakachi (daughter of Ōno no Azumabito)
- Wife: (daughter of Fujiwara no Torikai)
  - Son: Fujiwara no Ieyori (743–785)
- Wife: (daughter of Fujiwara no Yoshitsugu)
  - Son: Fujiwara no Oyori
  - Daughter: Fujiwara no Sōshi (藤原曹子; ?–793) (wife of Emperor Kōnin)
- Wife: (unknown)
  - Daughter: Wife of Fujiwara no Kosemaro
  - Daughter: (?–800) Wife of Fujiwara no Uchimaro
