= Fujiwara no Otomaro =

Japanese kugyō (court noble) of the Nara period

Fujiwara no Otomaro Ason
- 藤原乙麻呂

Governor of Echizen Province
- In office 749–750

Director of Dazaifu
- In office 750–752
- Succeeded by: Ki no Maro

Governor of Mimasaka Province
- In office 757–760

Personal details
- Born: Unknown
- Died: August 2, 760
- Occupation: kugyō

Fujiwara no Otomaro (藤原 乙麻呂, died August 2, 760) was a Japanese kugyō (court noble) of the Nara period. He was the son of Fujiwara no Muchimaro, the founder of the Nanke house of the powerful Fujiwara clan.

== Life ==
Otomaro was born as the fourth son of Minister of the Left Fujiwara no Muchimaro.

In 737, soon after the death of Muchimaro, the four Fujiwara brothers, together with their cousins, Nagate of the Hokke house and Hirotsugu of the Shikike house, were promoted from Junior Sixth Rank, Upper Grade to Junior Fifth Rank, Lower Grade. After working in the Ministry of War as the First Assistant to the Minister, he was promoted to Junior Fifth Rank, Upper Grade in 747.

During Empress Kōken's reign, Otomaro was promoted to Senior Fifth Rank, Upper Grade in 749 and became the Governor of Echizen Province. In 750, he was promoted to Junior Third Rank, Director of the Dazaifu. In 752, Ki no Maro became Director of the Dazaifu, and in 757 Otomaro was moved to the position of Governor of Mimasaka Province, but it is not clear what happened in the five years in between these two events. It is possible that Otomaro's relationship with his brother Nakamaro, who later became the leading figure of the government, deteriorated after Otomaru's exceptional promotion in 750.

Otomaro died on August 2, 760, as Junior Third Rank, Kei in the Ministry of War.

== Genealogy ==
- Father: Fujiwara no Muchimaro
- Mother: Ki no Maro's daughter
- Wife: Ishikawa no Takemaro's daughter
  - Son: Fujiwara no Korekimi
- Wife: Tachibana no Matsuga, Tachibana no Sai's daughter
  - Son: Fujiwara no Korehito
- Unknown mother
  - Daughter: Fujiwara no Imagawa's wife
