= Fujiwara Shiki-ke =

Fujiwara 藤原 (式家)
- Mon: Sagarifuji
- Home province: Yamato Province
- Parent house: Fujiwara clan
- Titles: Various
- Founder: Fujiwara no Umakai
- Founding year: 8th century

The Fujiwara Shiki-ke (藤原式家; lit. Fujiwara ceremonials house) was a cadet branch of the Fujiwara clan of Japan.

== History ==
It was founded by Fujiwara no Umakai, i.e., one of the four great houses of the Fujiwara, founded by the so-called Fujiwara Four, who were sons of Fujiwara no Fuhito.

The epithet Shiki-ke (式家) derives from the fact that the founder Umakai held the office of Shikibu-kyō (式部卿), or the head of the Shikibu-shō (式部省; "Ministry of Ceremonial"). Thus, Shiki-ke may be translated the "Ceremonials House."

The other branches were the Fujiwara Nan-ke (the eldest brother Muchimaro's line), Fujiwara Hok-ke (Fusasaki's line), and the Fujiwara Kyō-ke (Fujiwara no Maro's line).

Umakai's son Hirotsugu mounted a rebellion named after his name in 740, which ended with suppression and his death, spelling ill-fortune for the Shikike. The Nanke then gained hegemony again (back from the non-Fujiwara Tachibana no Moroe) until Nakamaro mounted his own uprising.

Shikike came into ascendancy with Fujiwara no Momokawa. The notorious Fujiwara no Kusuko who enticed and held sway over Emperor Heizei is also of the Shikike clan.

== See also ==
- Gosanke
