= Fujiwara Kyō-ke =

Fujiwara 藤原 (京家)
- Mon: Sagarifuji
- Home province: Yamato Province
- Parent house: Fujiwara clan
- Titles: Various
- Founder: Fujiwara no Maro
- Founding year: 8th century

The Fujiwara Kyō-ke (藤原京家; lit. Fujiwara capital house) was a cadet branch of the Fujiwara clan of Japan.

== History ==
It was founded by Fujiwara no Maro

Maro had three brothers: Muchimaro, Fusasaki, and Umakai. These four brothers are known for having established the "four houses" of the Fujiwara.

== See also ==
- Fujiwara Hok-ke
- Fujiwara Nan-ke
- Fujiwara Shiki-ke
