= Fujiwara no Korekimi =

Japanese aristocrat and statesman of the Nara period

Fujiwara no Korekimi 藤原是公
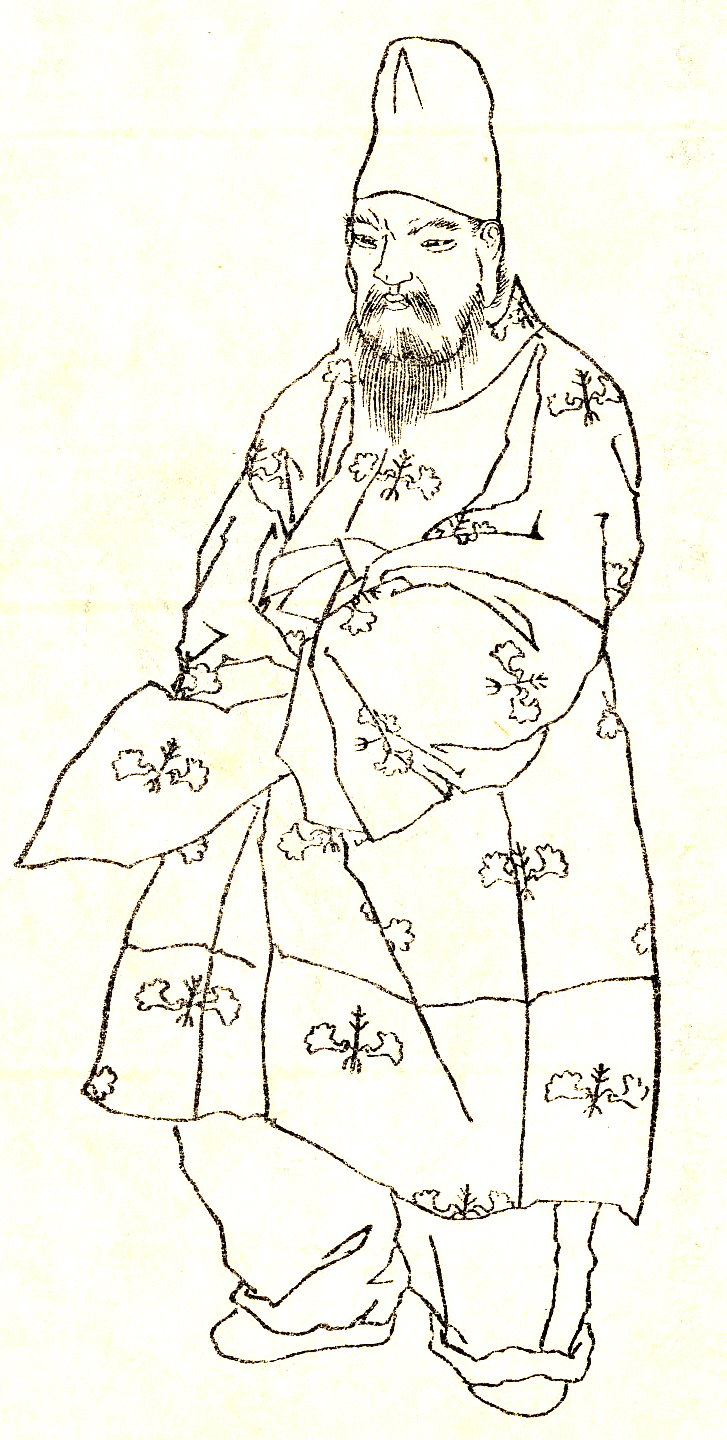
- Illustration by Kikuchi Yōsai, from Zenken Kojitsu
- Born: 727
- Died: October 12, 789
- Family: Fujiwara Nanke
- Father: Fujiwara no Otomaro

Fujiwara no Korekimi (藤原是公; 727 – October 12, 789) was a Japanese aristocrat and statesman of the Nara period. He reached the court rank of Junior Second Rank and the position of Minister of the Right (udaijin), and was posthumously promoted to Junior First Rank. He was also called Ushiya-daijin (牛屋大臣).

== Life ==
Fujiwara no Kuromaro (藤原黒麻呂) was born as the son of kugyō Fujiwara no Otomaro in 727. He is later known as Fujiwara no Korekimi.

In 761, Korekimi was promoted from shō roku-i no jō (正六位上) to ju go-i no ge (従五位下). After his uncle Fujiwara no Nakamaro's rebellion in 764, Korekimi served successively as governor of Harima Province and Yamashiro Province. He rose rapidly in the court of Empress Shōtoku. In 765 he was promoted to ju go-i no jō (従五位上) and division chief (督) of the imperial guard, and changed his name from Kuromaro to Korekimi. In 766 he was promoted again to ju shi-i no jō (従四位上).

His rise continued under Emperor Kōnin, and he was promoted to shō shi-i no ge (正四位下) in 773, and in 774 joined the ranks of the kugyō with a promotion to sangi. In 779 he was promoted to ju san-mi (従三位). In this period, while holding important posts in the imperial guard and daijō-kan, he also supported Prince Yamabe, the future Emperor Kanmu, as master of the Crown Prince's Quarters (春宮大夫, tōgū no daibu).

Shortly after Kanmu's ascension to the throne in 781, a number of important officials since Kōnin's time, including sadaijin Fujiwara no Uona, udaijin Ōnakatomi no Kiyomaro, dainagon Isonokami no Yakatsugu, and udaijin Fujiwara no Tamaro, died or left office, and Korekimi was again rapidly promoted. In 781 he was promoted to shō san-mi (正三位) and chūnagon, in 782 to dainagon, and in 783 to udaijin, making him the most powerful man in the daijō-kan.

Korekimi died in 789, at the age of 63. His rank at the time of his death was ju ni-i (従二位), and he held positions both as udaijin and as a general in the imperial guard. He was posthumously promoted to ju ichi-i (従一位).

== Personality ==
According to the Shoku Nihongi, Korekimi had a large build and majestic presence. He was a capable official, well versed in the governmental affairs of the day, who made decisions quickly and without delay.

== Genealogy ==
- Father: Fujiwara no Otomaro (藤原乙麻呂)
- Mother: daughter of Ishikawa no Tatemaro (石川建麻呂) or Ishikawa no Murajimaro (石川連麻呂)
- Wife: Tachibana no Matsuga (橘真都我), daughter of Tachibana no Sai (橘佐為), ex-wife of Otomaro
  - Second son: Fujiwara no Matomo (藤原真友; 742-797)
  - Third son: Fujiwara no Otomo (藤原雄友; 753-811)
  - Son: Fujiwara no Ototomo (藤原弟友)
- Unknown wife:
  - Son: Fujiwara no Tomohito (藤原友人; 767-822)
  - Daughter: Fujiwara no Yoshiko (藤原吉子; ?-807), wife of Emperor Kanmu, mother of Prince Iyo
