= Mongaku =

Japanese Buddhist samurai and priest

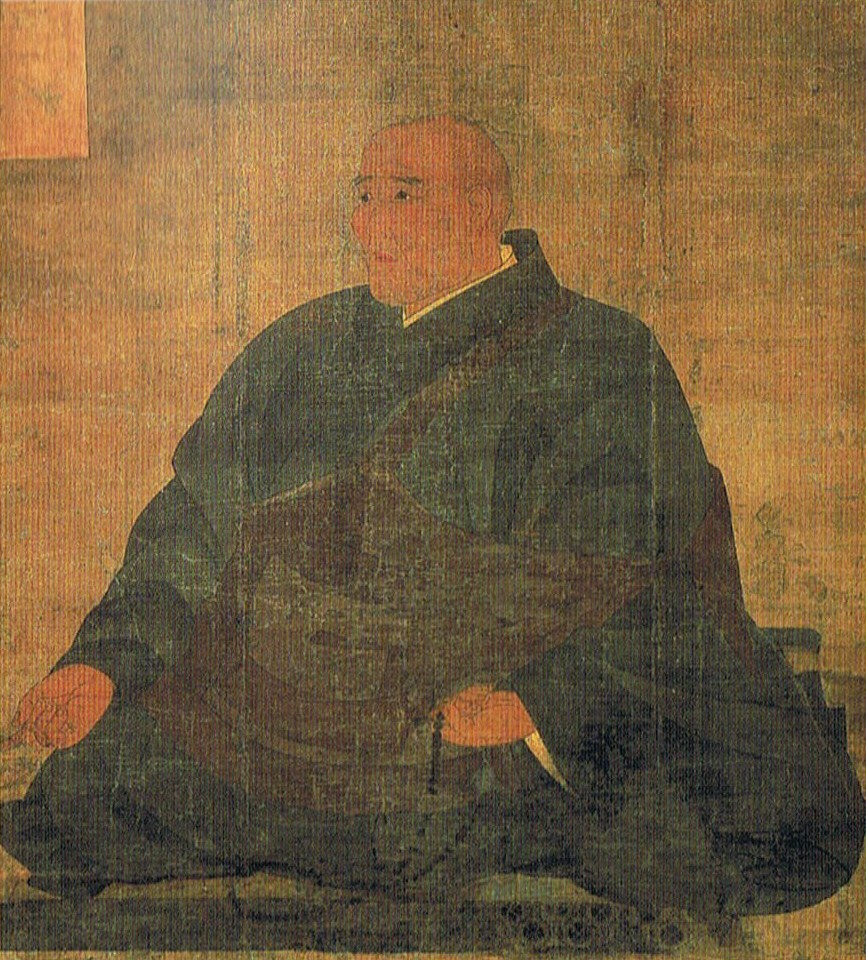
Portrait of Mongaku (Tokyo National Museum)

Mongaku (文覚) was a Japanese samurai and Shingon Buddhist priest of the late Heian and early Kamakura period. He was a close associate of shogun Minamoto no Yoritomo, having contributed to the declaration of the Genpei War. Myōe was the disciple of his disciple Jōkaku. His secular name, before ordination, was Endō Moritō. He is also known as Mongaku Shōnin.

== Life ==
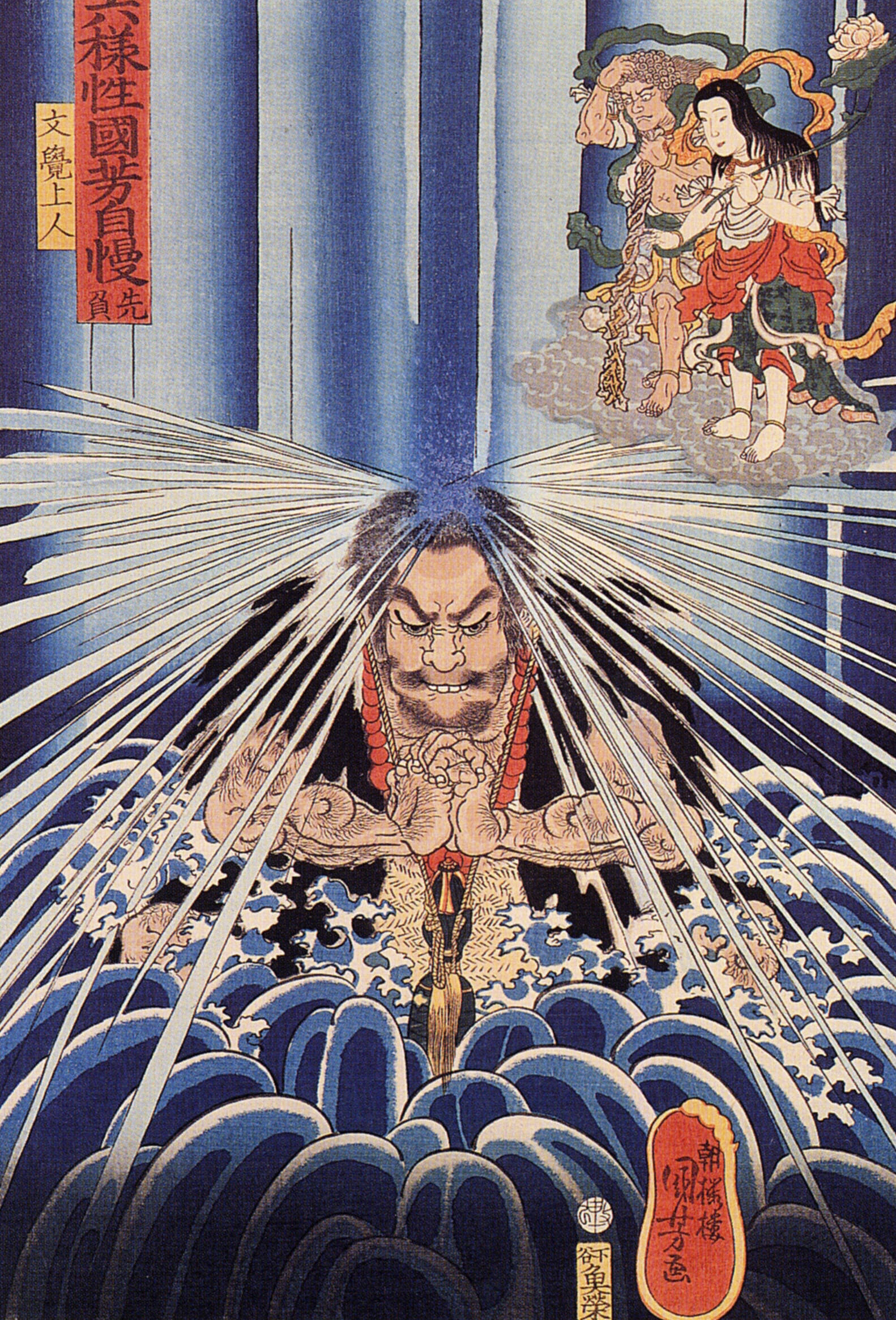
Mongaku penancing at Nachi waterfall with Kiṃkara and Ceṭaka (by Utagawa Kuniyoshi)

Mongaku was born the son of Endō Mochitō, a samurai in the Watanabe faction of the Settsu Genji clan (a branch of the Minamoto clan).

He initially served in the Imperial Palace Guards of the North Side. He fell in love with Kesa, the wife of Minamoto no Wataru, but killed her by accident. Out of repentance, he then ordinated as a priest, visiting sacred places across the country. Mongaku moved to live at Jingo-ji temple in 1168, and participated in its restoration work motivated by his reverence towards Kūkai.

In 1173, he requested a manorial temple estate for Jingo-ji from Cloistered Emperor Go-Shirakawa, resulting in Mongaku being exiled to Izu Province. During his exile in Izu, he met the future shogun Minamoto no Yoritomo. In 1178, he was allowed to return to Kyoto. His respect for the Cloistered Emperor was never lost even after his exile, and in 1180, he urged Yoritomo to make a call to arms and declare war against the Taira clan, whom the Cloistered Emperor had ordered to be destroyed.

According to Gyokuyō, Yoritomo sent Mongaku to Kiso Yoshinaka to accuse him of negligence in the punitive expedition against the Taira clan and of being reckless in Kyoto.

After the destruction of the Taira clan and the establishment of the Kamakura Shogunate, Mongaku was a highly trusted associate of Yoritomo. After his successful role in the declaration of war against the Taira clan, Mongaku's request was finally heard, and the Cloistered Emperor gave the Kaseda Manor in Kii Province to Jingo-ji in 1183. After this, the temple received further estates from both Yoritomo and the Cloistered Emperor. By 1190, the temple buildings were almost completely restored.

After the restoration of Jingo-ji, he also restored Tō-ji temple, also out of reverence towards Kūkai, and in 1189, Harima Province was designated a zōkoku (a province to bear the expenses of a construction of a shrine or temple). In 1197, the restoration was complete.

Mongaku lost his benefactors when the Cloistered Emperor died in 1192 and Yoritomo died in 1199. After the two died, Minister of the Interior Minamoto no Michichika exiled Mongaku to Sado Province for conspiracy against the government for his alleged involvement in the Sansaemon incident. He was allowed to return to Kyoto in 1202, but was exiled to Tsushima Province the following year by Emperor Emeritus Go-Toba; Mongaku died in exile in Tsushima.

== Sansaemon Incident Mastermind Theory ==
Megumi Sogabe believes that Mongaku was the mastermind of Prince Morisada's conspiracy, known as the Sansaemon incident. She argues that this is indicated by the facts that: the two exiles were connected based on the description in The Tale of the Heike stating that the exile to Tsushima was caused by a dispute over the return of the estates of Jingo-ji, which were confiscated by the Emperor Emeritus Go-Toba after the incident; his punishment was heavier than that of his relatives in the court; the estates of Jingo-ji were immediately returned after the death of Emperor Emeritus Go-Toba.

== Personality ==
In Gukanshō, Mongaku is described as a reckless, uneducated man of action, who spoke ill of others and revered Tengu. It also states that Mongaku and Yoritomo were close friends who spent four years all day together.

According to Seiashō, there were rumors that Mongaku hated Saigyō, a monk of the same period.
