= Princess Shirataki =

Figure in Japanese folklore

In Japanese folklore, the Princess Shirataki (白滝姫, Shirataki-hime) lived either during the Heian period or the Nara period, and is said to have taught the people of what is now Kiryū, Gunma how to weave silk; the success of the silk industry in Kiryu is attributed to her, and their specialty fabric of kiryu brocade as well. She is sometimes said to be the daughter of Fujiwara no Toyonari, a Minister of the Right.

== Legend ==
In one retelling of the folktale by Kan Matsuzaki, a young man by the name of Kyusuke (久助, Kyuusuke) from Yamada district of Kōzuke Province (now Kiryu) was sent by his village to serve at the Imperial Court. At the Court, Kyusuke was assigned work as a common labourer; finding a scrip of paper on which was written a waka poem mocking him, his rural origins and presumed illiteracy:

A dirty Yamada crow has flown in from the east

Flapping his wings to sweep the garden.

Calmly, he composed a response to the Court ladies so elegant it rendered them silent.

Even a dirty crow with outstretched wings

Can soar high into the sky

To freely gaze down on the Nobles at Court.

The writer of the former poem was the Princess Shirataki, who ran away ashamed, for she thought that he could not read nor write. However, Kyusuke saw that she was beautiful. As Kyusuke worked, his fondness for the Princess grew; he became literally love-sick, writing poems for the Princess from his bedridden state - though he received no response. When he recovered, the Emperor asked what he desired, and he responded with Shirataki's name. Though ridiculed, the Emperor saw his sincerity in the poems that he had composed during his illness for her, and organized a waka-writing competition, declaring that if Kyusuke won against Shirataki, he could have her as his bride. The Princess, for her part, had fallen in love with Kyusuke, and so was secretly excited at this prospect.

The Princess goes first, and writes thusly:

Should the rice plants become desiccated

From unending drought in Yamada

What will you depend upon for your sustenance?

To which Kyusuke responded:

Should drought wither the rice plants in Yamada

I pray that the waters of Shirataki

Will quench the thirst in my heart.

Hearing this, the Emperor and his Court were moved, and so they were married. Kyusuke and Shirataki returned to Yamada as husband and wife, and lived a peaceable life writing and reading poetry for each other. The Princess also taught the people of the district how to weave silk. Shortly after giving birth to a son, she grew ill, and composed a death poem for her husband:

My fleeting life is so like dissolving water foam -

From my eyes the waters of Shirataki overflow

Falling on the summit of Iwamoto.

After her death, a shrine was built to her memory, and she is now worshipped as a kami in the Shinto religion.

== Alternate tellings ==
In other versions of the tale, Yamada is placed on the north slope of Mount Rokkō, which is now in Hyōgo Prefecture.

== In popular culture ==
Kiryū City officially released a manga titled The Silk Weaver’s Apprentice and the Kiryū Spirit in collaboration with Tokyo-based publisher Manga Planet. The series is being simultaneously released in both English and Japanese on Manga Planet's official website. In the manga, Princess Shirataki takes the form of a young girl and appears suddenly before an apprentice of the Kiryū tradition and his childhood friend, a girl attending the Tokyo College of Art. These three live together, learn the seven techniques of the Kiryū art and discover how to use it in modern-day fashion.
