= Fujiwara no Tsuginawa =

Japanese statesman, courtier and politician (727–796)

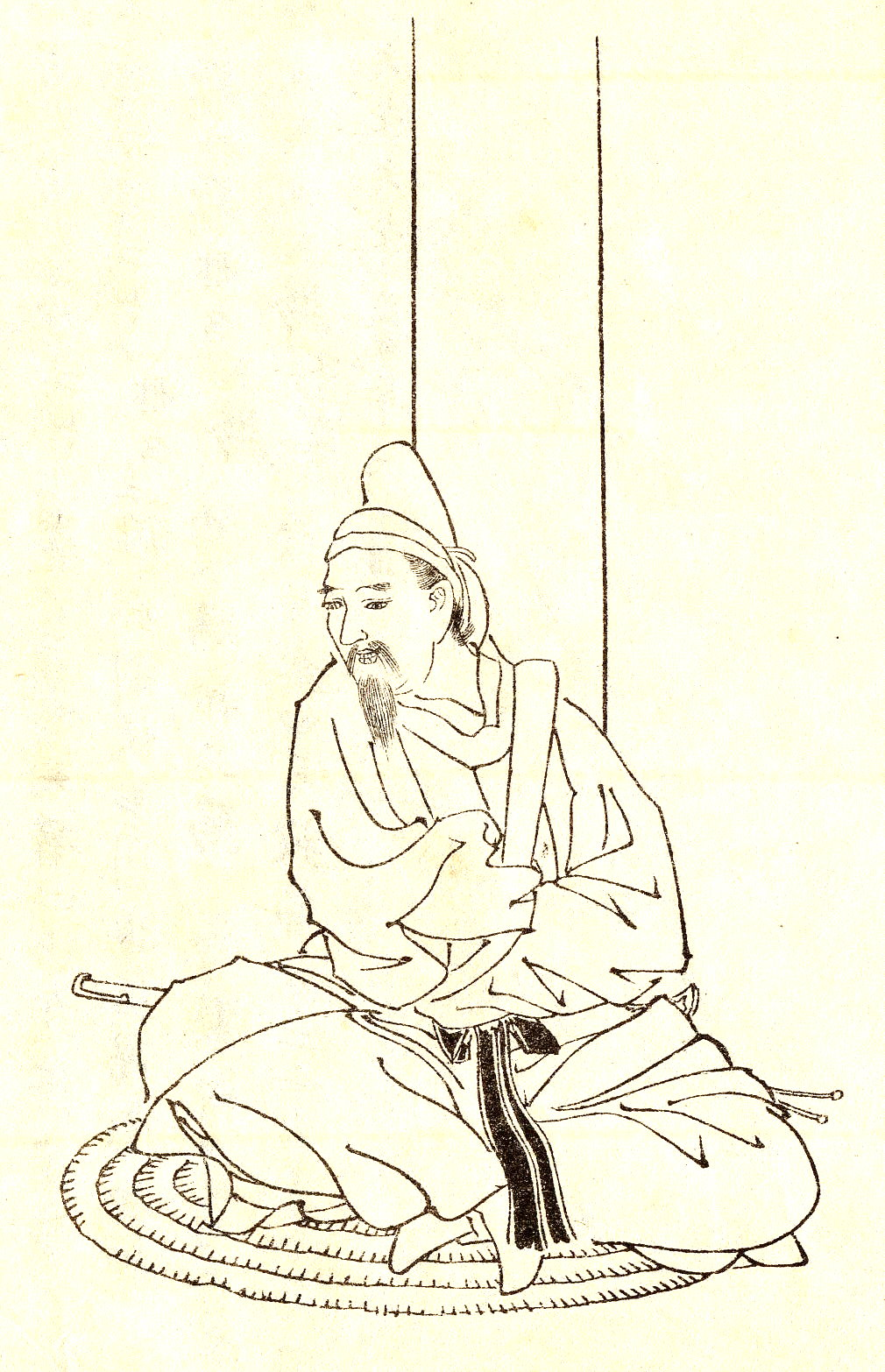
- Born: 727
- Died: 796
- Parents: Fujiwara no Toyonari (father)

Fujiwara no Tsuginawa (藤原継縄; 727–796), also known as Fujiwara no Tsugutada and Monozomo no Udajin, was a Japanese statesman, courtier and politician during the Nara period.

== Career ==
In 780 (Hōki 11), Tsuginawa is given the title sei-i-tai-shogun (barbarian subduing general) for an expedition to northern Honshu to subdue the emishi, also known as the ebisu.

Tsuginawa served as a minister during the reign of Emperor Kanmu.

- 788 (Enryaku 7, 1st month): Tsuginawa participates in the coming of age ceremony for Ate-shinno (安殿親王) who would become Emperor Heizei.
- 790 (Enryaku 9, 2nd month): Tsuginawa was named udaijin.
- 796 (Enryaku 15, 16th day of the 7th month): Tsuginawa died at age 70.

== Genealogy ==
This member of the Fujiwara clan was the son of Toyonari.

He was the father of Fujiwara no Otoaki.

== Selected works ==
In a statistical overview derived from writings by and about Fujiwara no Tsuginawa, OCLC/WorldCat encompasses roughly 10 works in 10+ publications in 1 language and 50+ library holdings.

- 続日本紀 (1657)
- Shoku Nihongi (1940)
