= Tōshi Kaden =

Tōshi Kaden (藤氏家伝), commonly abbreviated to Kaden, is a Japanese biographical record of the Fujiwara clan. Compiled by Fujiwara no Nakamaro and Enkei, it was completed between 760 and 766. It is two volumes in length.

== Contents ==
The first volume, known formally as Taishoku Kanden (大織冠伝), was compiled by Fujiwara no Nakamaro. It records the biography of Fujiwara no Kamatari, the ancestor of the Fujiwara clan. This is followed by accounts of his children, Jōe and Fuhito. However, only the Jōe passage survives.

The second volume, known formally as Muchimaro-den (武智麻呂伝), was compiled by Enkei. It records the biography of Fujiwara no Muchimaro.

The text is viewed as a valuable supplemental historical source as it contains a number of anecdotal incidents not found elsewhere in historical records.
