= Fujiwara no Suenori =

Japanese nobleman (1090–1155)

Fujiwara no Suenori Ason
- 藤原季範

High Priest of Atsuta Shrine
- In office 1114–1137
- Preceded by: Owari Kazumoto
- Succeeded by: Fujiwara no Norimasa

Personal details
- Born: 1090; Owari Province, Japan
- Died: December 27, 1155 (aged 65)
- Children: Fujiwara no Noritada; Yura Gozen; Fujiwara no Norimasa; Fujiwara no Norinobu; Fujiwara no Noritsuna; Noritomo; Nagaaki; Sukenori; Chiaki Ama; Daishin no Tsubone
- Parent: Fujiwara no Suekane (father)
- Relatives: Minamoto no Yoritomo (grandson); Ashikaga no Yoshiyasu (son-in-law)

Fujiwara no Suenori (藤原 季範, 1090 – December 27, 1155) was a Japanese nobleman and High Priest of Atsuta Shrine during the late Heian period. He was the grandfather of Minamoto no Yoritomo, the founder and first shogun of the Kamakura shogunate, and a member of the Nanke House of the powerful Fujiwara clan. He held the court rank of Junior Fourth Rank.

== Life ==
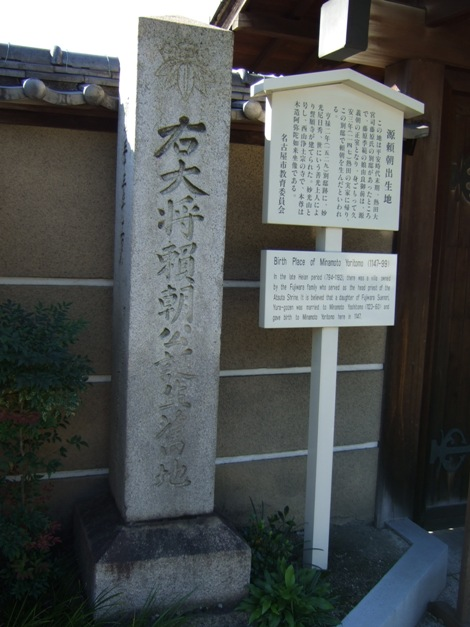
Monument of Minamoto no Yoritomo's birthplace, Suenori's villa, at Seigan-ji.

Suenori was born in 1090, in Owari Province, where his father Fujiwara no Suekane ruled as the acting governor (mokudai) of Owari Province. At the time of his birth, his father was considerably old at 47 years of age, and died when Suenori was 12 years old. Suenori's mother was the daughter of Owari Kazumoto, the high priest (daigūji) of Atsuta Shrine. The Owari clan had established the Atsuta Shrine in 192, and held the position of the shrine's high priest since ancient times, passing it down from generation to generation. However, in 1114, Kazumoto handed the position over to Suenori, who was from the Fujiwara clan. Since then, the Fujiwara clan became the head of Atsuta Shrine, while the Owari clan stepped down to the position of adjutant chief priest (gongūji).

In August of the 3rd year of Hōen (1137), Suenori, having seen a dream, passed the position of high priest down to his fifth son, Norimasa. However, after Suenori's death in 1155, his eldest son Noritada took the position from his younger brother.

Outside Owari Province, Suenori spent a lot of his time in Kyoto, and received the court rank of Junior Fourth Rank.

Suenori died in 1155, at the age of 65.

== Genealogy ==
Suenori was the grandfather of Minamoto no Yoritomo, the founder and first shogun of the Kamakura shogunate, through his daughter Yura Gozen who married Minamoto no Yoshitomo. Thus, besides the Imperial Court, the family had close ties to the samurai military government as well.

=== Family ===
- Father: Fujiwara no Suekane
- Mother: Owari Motoko, daughter of Owari Kazumoto
- Wife: Daughter of Minamoto no Yukihiro
  - Eldest son: Fujiwara no Noritada
- Unknown mother:
  - Fifth son: Fujiwara no Norimasa
  - Son: Fujiwara no Norinobu
  - Son: Fujiwara no Noritsuna
  - Son: Noritomo
  - Son: Nagaaki
  - Son: Sukenori
  - Daughter: Chiaki Ama, Jōsaimon-in's lady-in-waiting
  - Daughter: Daishin no Tsubone, Taikenmon-in's lady-in-waiting
  - Daughter: Yura Gozen, Minamoto no Yoshitomo's official wife, Yoritomo's mother
  - Daughter: Minamoto no Morotaka's wife
- Adopted children:
  - Daughter: Ashikaga no Yoshiyasu's official wife

== See also ==
- Nanke (Fujiwara)
- Atsuta Shrine
