= Fujiwara no Uona =

Japanese aristocrat and statesman of the Nara period

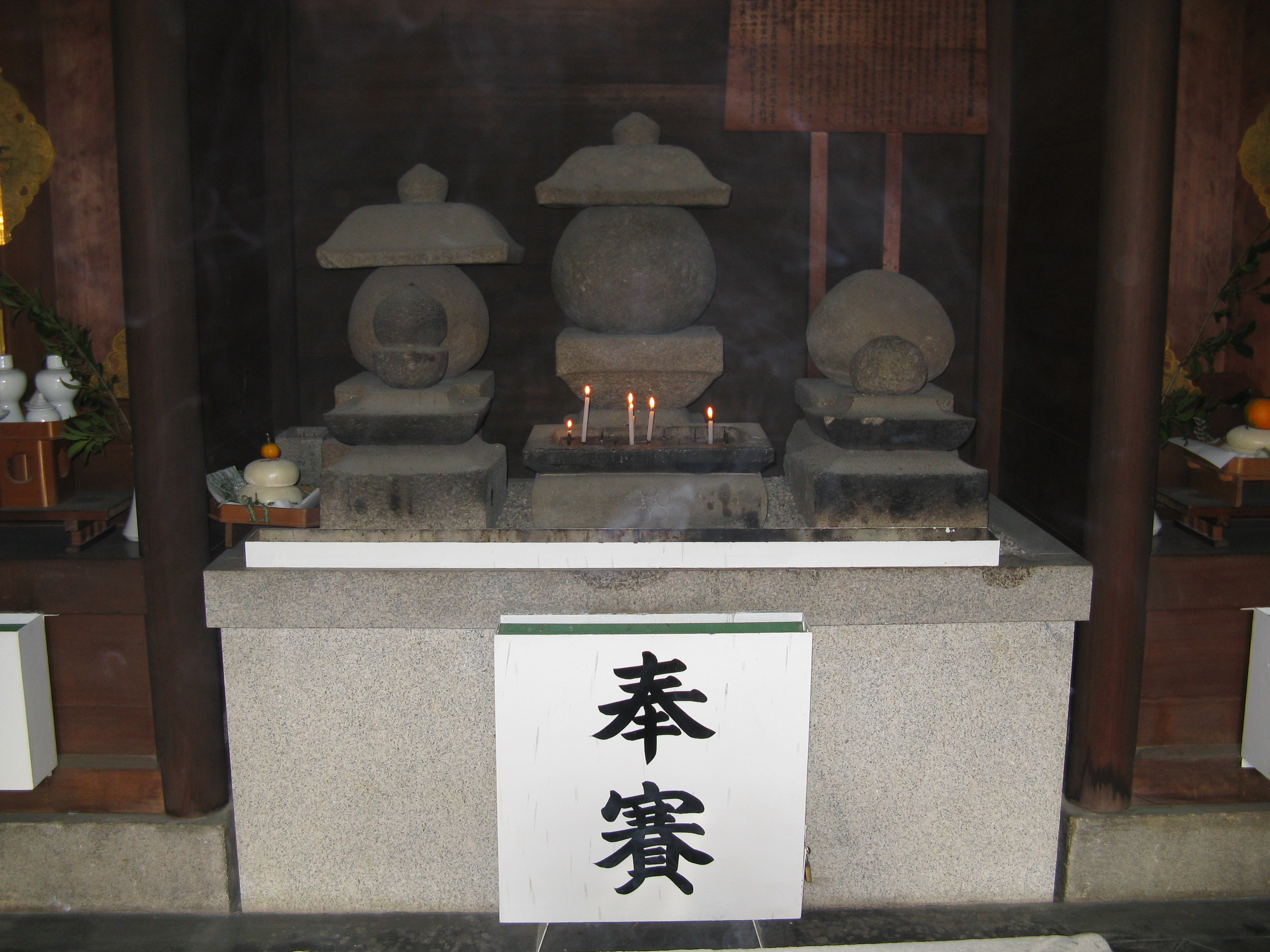
Grave of Fujiwara no Uona

Fujiwara no Uona (藤原 魚名, 721 – August 31, 783) was a Japanese aristocrat and statesman of the Nara period who was Minister of the Left and a member of the Fujiwara clan. He was the fifth son of Fujiwara no Fusasaki (681–737). His grave is located at the Hattori Tenjinju Shrine in Osaka.

Some Japanese clans that descend from Fujiwara no Uona are Kondō, Shindō, Mutō, Bitō. More in number are Satō, Gotō, Katō, Saitō. Along with the names Hayashi, Togashi, Takeda, Kawai, Inazu, Yuuki, Matsuda, Sano, Hatano.

== Family ==
- Father: Fujiwara no Fusasaki (藤原房前, 681–737)
- Mother: daughter of Katano no Tomoomi (片野朝臣の娘)
  - Wife: daughter of Fujiwara no Umakai (藤原宇合の娘)
    - Son: Fujiwara no Takatori (藤原鷹取, ?–784)
    - Son: Fujiwara no Washitori (藤原鷲取, ?–?)
    - Third son: Fujiwara no Sueshige (藤原末茂, ?–?)
  - Wife: lady from the Sumori clan (津守氏)
    - Fifth son: Fujiwara no Fujinari (藤原藤成, 776–822)
  - Children with unknown mother:
    - Son: Fujiwara no Mawashi (藤原真鷲, ?–?)
    - Daughter: Wife of Fujiwara no Oguromaro (藤原小黒麻呂室)
    - Daughter: Wife of Fujiwara no Nagamichi (藤原長道室)
