= Fujiwara no Fusasaki =

Member of the Fujiwara clan

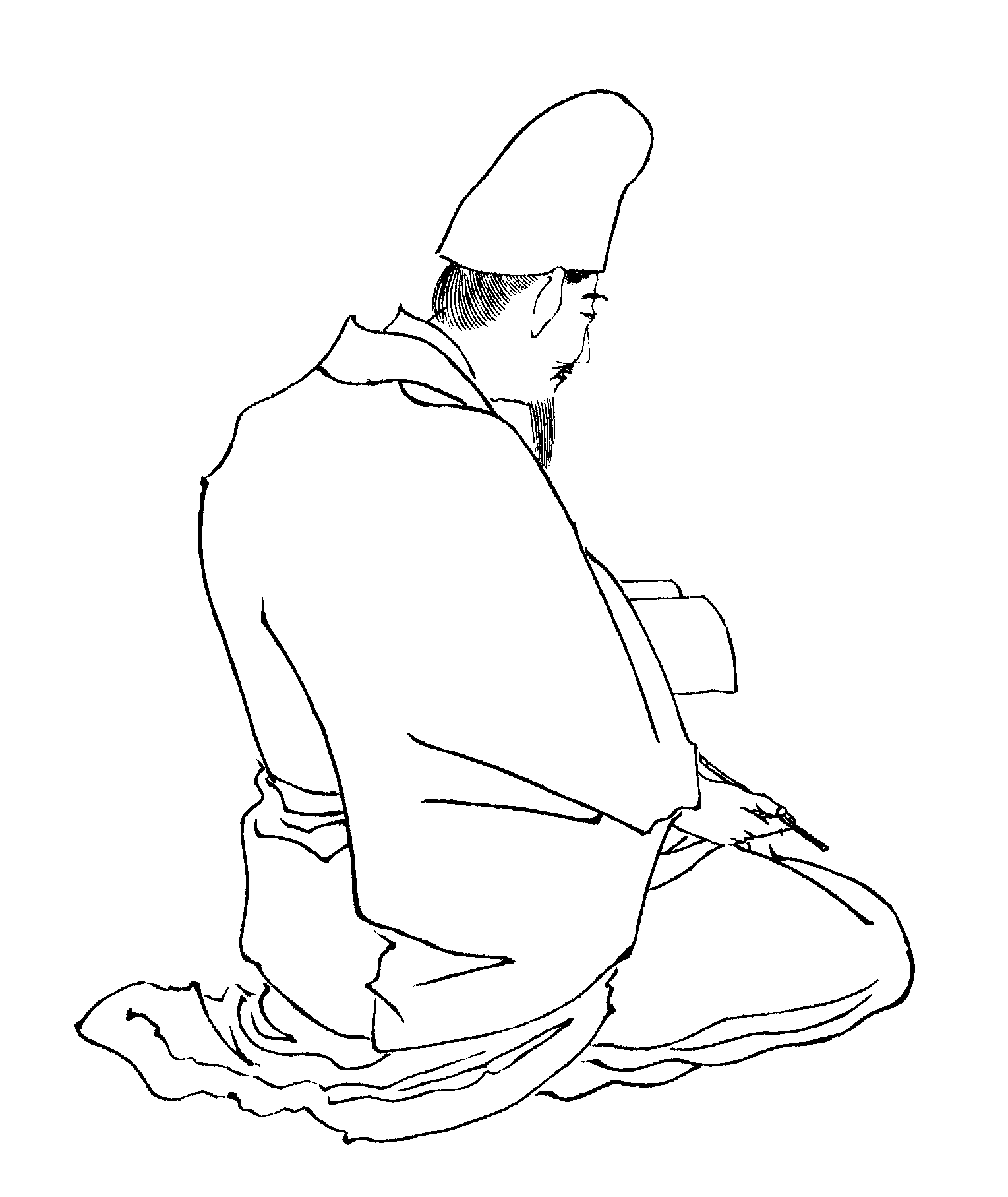
- Fujiwara no Fusasaki
- Native name: 藤原 房前
- Born: 681
- Died: 737
- Spouse: Muro no Oukami (daughter of Mine-ō - a descendant of Emperor Bidatsu)
- Issue: Fujiwara no Nagate; Fujiwara no Matate; Fujiwara no Mitate; Fujiwara no Kitanobunin; And many others
- Father: Fujiwara no Fuhito
- Mother: Soga no Shōshi

Notes
- Relatives; Fujiwara no Muchimaro (brother); Fujiwara no Miyako (brother); Fujiwara no Nagako (brother); Fujiwara no Umakai (brother); Fujiwara no Maro (brother); Empress Kōmyō (sister); Fujiwara no Tabino (brother)

Fujiwara no Fusasaki (藤原 房前, 681 – May 25, 737) was a Japanese court noble who was a member of the Fujiwara clan and the founder of the Hokke House of the Fujiwara. He served as Sangi (Associate Counselor) in the Imperial Court.

== Career ==
Fusasaki was a Sangi (associate counselor) in the Daijō-kan.

He founded the temple of Sugimoto-dera in Kamakura in 734 with the priest Gyōki (668–749). The temple's legend holds that Empress Komyo (701–760) in the Nara Period (710–794) instructed Fusasaki, the then high-ranking minister, and a famous priest named Gyoki (668–749) to build the temple enshrining a statue of Eleven-Headed Kan'non, or Ekādaśamukha in Sanskrit, as the main object of worship. Priest Gyoki fashioned the statue himself because he was also a great sculptor.

Fusasaki and his three brothers died during a major smallpox epidemic in 737.

== Family ==
- Father: Fujiwara no Fuhito (藤原不比等, 659–720)
- Mother: Soga no Shōshi (蘇我娼子, ?–?), daughter of Soga no Murajiko (蘇我連子)
- Main-wife (seishitsu): Muro no O-Okimi (牟漏女王, ?–746), daughter of Minu-Ō (美努王)

Order	Name	Japanese	Lifetime
2nd son	Fujiwara no Nagate	藤原永手	714–771
3rd son	Fujiwara no Matate	藤原真楯	715–766
6th son	Fujiwara no Mitate	藤原御楯	? –764
daughter	wife of Emperor Shōmu	北殿	? –760

- Wife: Daughter of Kusagunokura no Oyu (春日倉老)

Order	Name	Japanese	Lifetime
1st son	Fujiwara no Torikai	藤原鳥養	? – ?

- Wife: Daughter of Katano no Ason (片野朝臣)

Order	Name	Japanese	Lifetime
4th son	Fujiwara no Kiyokawa	藤原清河	706–778
5th son	Fujiwara no Uona	藤原魚名	721–783

- Wife: Daughter of (阿波采)

Order	Name	Japanese	Lifetime
7th son	Fujiwara no Kaedemaro	藤原楓麻呂	723–776

- Children with unknown mother:

Order	Name	Japanese	Lifetime
daughter	wife of Fujiwara no Toyonari	藤原豊成室	? – ?
daughter	Fujiwara no Ohirako	藤原宇比良古	? – 762
