= Taifu =

Japanese noble title

Taifu (大夫) was a noble title in Japan, denoting a court rank between First Rank and Fifth Rank under the Ritsuryō system. It was also commonly used to refer to a holder of Fifth Rank, but also for holders of Fourth and Fifth Rank, to differentiate from holders of First, Second and Third Rank, collectively known as kugyō.

== History ==
In the ancient Yamato period Japan, the title was used to refer to a close attendant of the Emperor or Okimi. Prior to the Taika Reform in 645, a government official below Ōomi and Ōmuraji of the same name was called Maetsugimi, whose duty was to submit matters to the Emperor.

According to the kushiki-ryō of the ritsuryō law, a Taifu holds a court rank of Third Rank or higher in the Great Council of State, a court rank of Fourth Rank in a government institution above a bureau, and a court rank of Fifth Rank or higher as a shi (official in a government department beneath a bureau) or in a chūgoku (a province of the second highest rank) or lower.

Although Taifu is the collective honorary title denoting a court rank between First Rank and Fifth Rank, holders of high-ranking court ranks above Third Rank were referred to as kugyō, and thus Taifu became commonly used for holders of Fourth and Fifth Rank. As Taifu is an honorary title, the title was in heavy use for the holders of Fifth Rank, which ultimately led to Taifu colloquially becoming synonymous with Fifth Rank.

Despite Fifth Rank being the lowest rank for peerage, for regional samurai with no illustrious lineage, conferring a peerage and being awarded the title of Taifu was glorious.

In the Edo period, the top-ranking samurai officials and advisors, karō, were called taifu. A similar title seen in ancient Zhou China as an official rank called 大夫 (dàfū), which ranked below 卿 (qīng) and above 士 (shì), was taken from the Zhou Chinese system, and of which the Japanized form taifu was used for the hatamoto.

At the Ise Grand Shrine, the deputy senior priest, gonnegi, holding the court rank of Fifth Rank is called Taifu.

== Pronunciation ==
Although the kana form of the title is "taifu", in modern Japanese the pronunciation would be "tayū".

The government office of the same name (but pronounced daibu) referred to the director of a government agency (shiki) or a government office (bō), such as High Steward of the Right Capital District (Ukyō no Daibu) and Director of the Crown Prince's Quarters (Tōgū no Daibu). This pronunciation was to differentiate from the Vice-Minister of the eight ministries with the same pronunciation but different kanji writing form (大輔).

== Other usages ==
As Fifth Rank was seen as the entrance to peerage for the commoners and low-ranking samurai alike, it became a popular word for a distinguished person. As a result, many respectable figures in entertainment such as leading actors, entertainers, priests and prostitutes began to be dubbed with this title.

For example, in kabuki theater, the leading female role actor (tateoyama) is referred to as tayū, and in sarugaku theater, the leader of a troupe is called tayū. In Shinto, a priest who practices rituals through performing arts is called tayū. In jōruri narrative music, the singer is called tayū. Among government permitted prostitutes, the highest rank, matsu, was also called tayū.

In the modern times, similar usage of tayū exists in Japanese street performance, kadozuke (performance at the gate of a house), and manzai.

== See also ==
- Kugyō
- Omi
- Scholar-official (China)
