= Unryū-in =

Buddhist sub-temple in Kyoto, Japan

Coordinates: 34°58′37.7″N 135°46′48.4″E

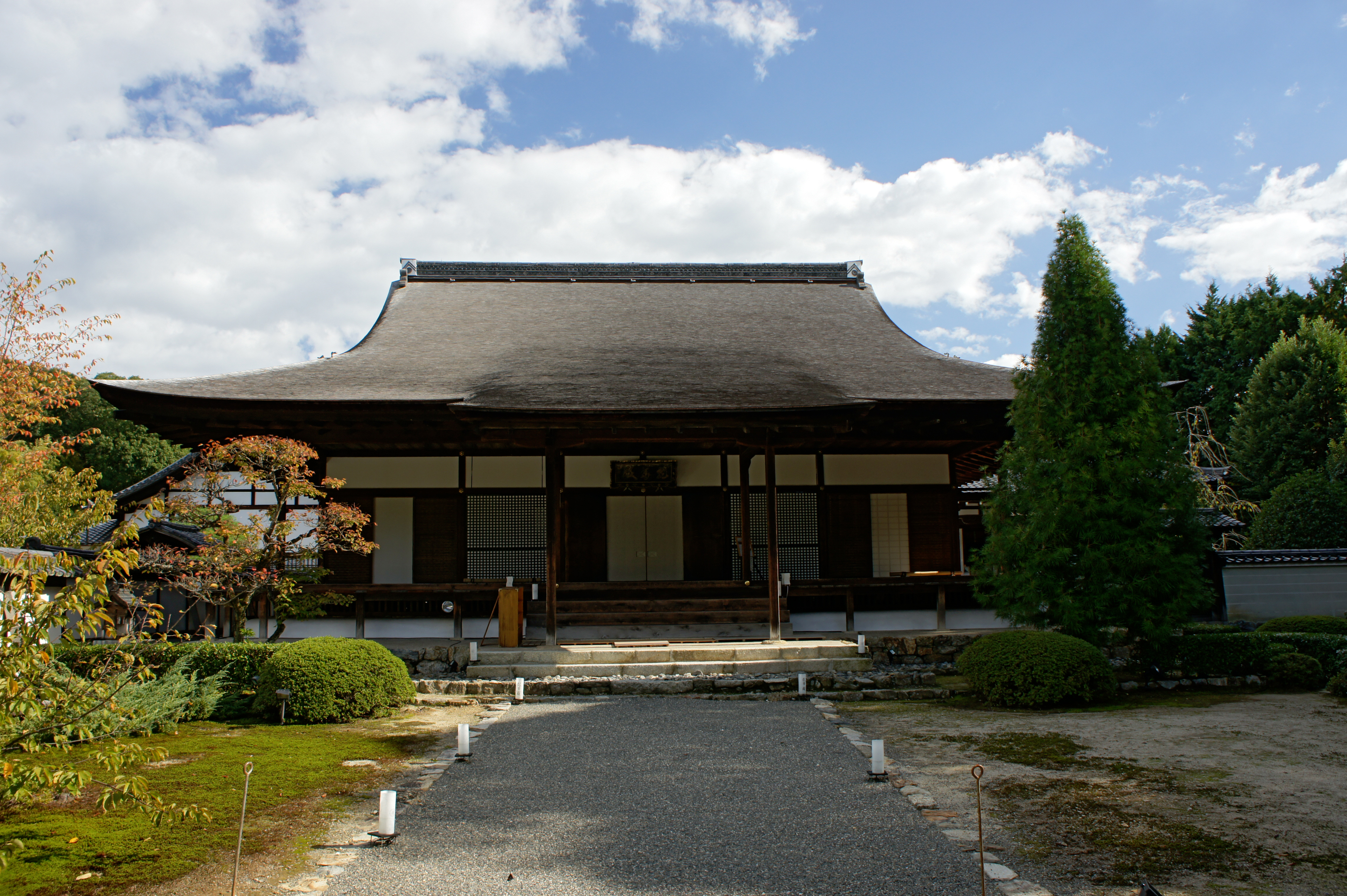
Unryū-in Hondō (1646), an Important Cultural Property

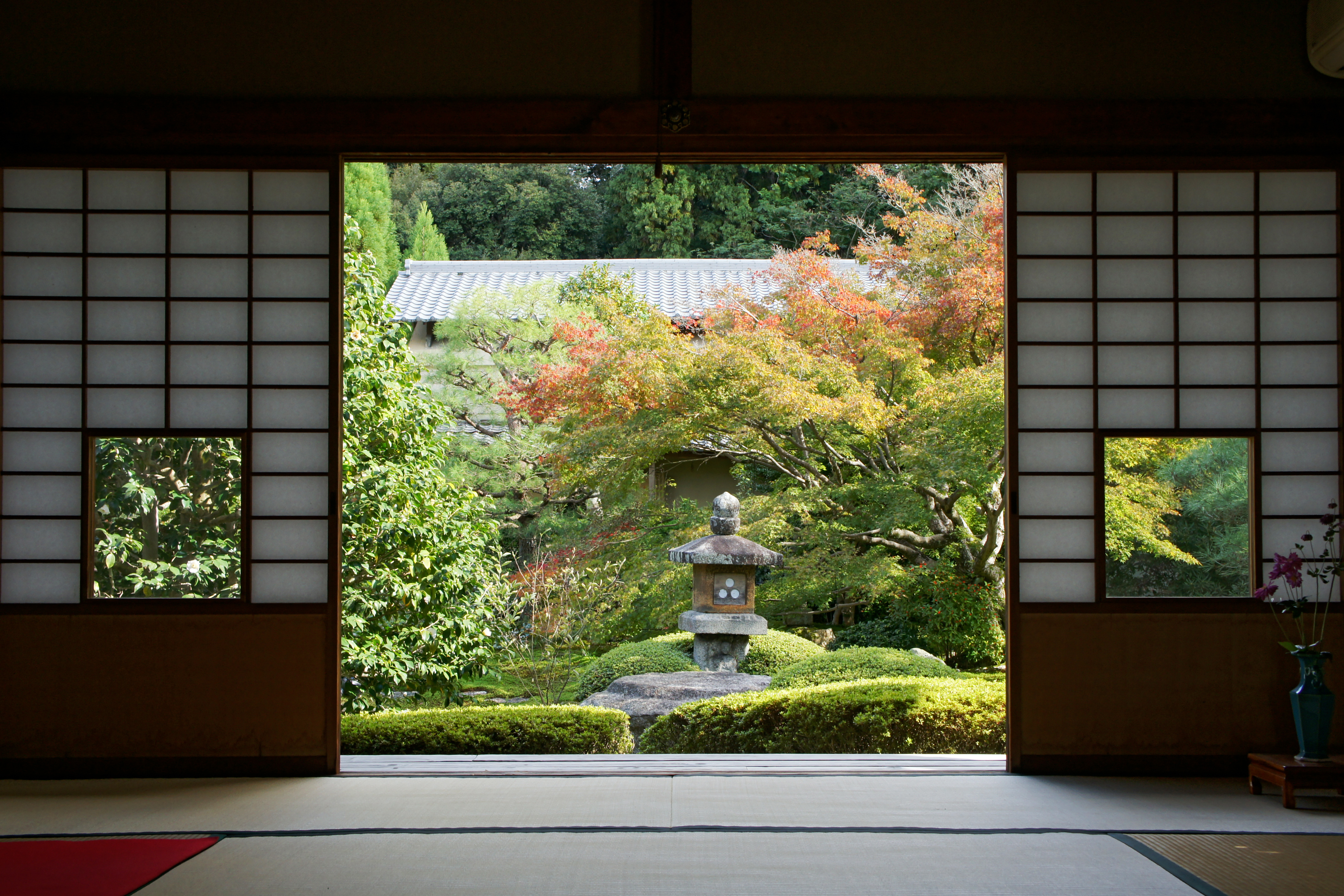
Gardens of Unryū-in

Unryū-in (雲竜院) is a sub-temple of Sennyū-ji in Kyoto, Japan. Founded in 1372, it was rebuilt after destruction in the Ōnin War. The Hondō of 1646 (13.8m x 12.9m, irimoya-zukuri, shake roof) is an Important Cultural Property. The Hōjō or abbot's quarters also date from the Edo period. A Kamakura period copy of the Lotus sutra has been designated an Important Cultural Property.

== See also ==
- Sennyū-ji
