= Fujiwara no Toyonari =

Japanese statesman, courtier and politician

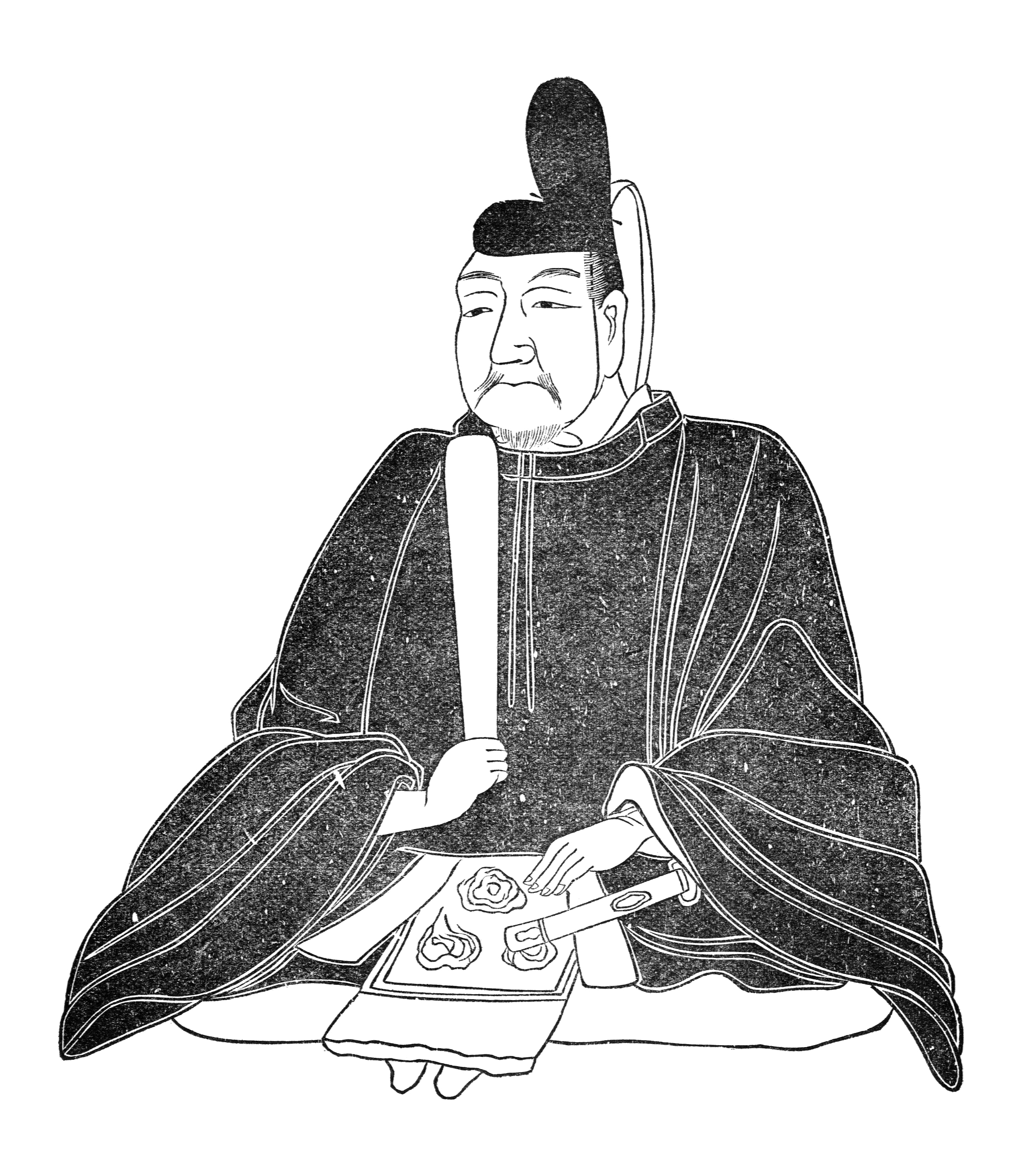
- Fujiwara no Toyonari
- Born: 704
- Died: 765
- Parents: Fujiwara no Muchimaro (father)

Fujiwara no Toyonari (藤原豊成; 704–765) was a Japanese statesman, courtier and politician during the Nara period.

== Career ==
Toyonari served as a minister during the reigns of Emperor Shōmu, Empress Kōken, Emperor Junnin and Empress Shōtoku.

- 749 (4th month): Toyonari was promoted in rank from dainagon to a rank equivalent to udaijin.
- 765 (Tenroku 3, 11th month): Toyonari died at age 62.

== Genealogy ==
This member of the Fujiwara clan was the son of Muchimaro. Toyonari's brothers were Nakamaro and Otomaro.

Toyonari was the father of Fujiwara no Tsuginawa.
