= Fujiwara Hok-ke =

Cadet branch of the Fujiwara clan

Fujiwara 藤原 (北家)
- Mon: Sagarifuji
- Parent house: Fujiwara clan
- Titles: Various
- Founder: Fujiwara no Fusasaki
- Founding year: 8th century
- Cadet branches: Five regent houses; Kazan’in family; Takakura family; Ononomiya family

The Fujiwara Hok-ke (藤原北家; lit. Fujiwara northern house) was a cadet branch of the Fujiwara clan of Japan.

The other three were the Fujiwara Nan-ke, Fujiwara Kyō-ke and Fujiwara Shiki-ke. The Hok-ke branch issued the de facto rulers of Japan through their hereditary position as imperial regents (Sesshō and Kampaku). In the Kamakura period, it further split into the Five regent houses, who continued to monopolize the regency from the 12th century until 1868. After the Meiji Restoration, these houses were appointed Prince in the new hereditary peerage.

== History ==
The branch was founded by Fujiwara no Fusasaki, the second son of Fujiwara no Fuhito, in the Heian period. Being located in the north (hoku) of his brother's mansion, the epithet Hoku-ke or abbreviated Hok-ke was given. Fusasaki had three brothers: Muchimaro, Maro and Umakai, and these four brothers are known for having established the "four houses" of the Fujiwara; the Hok-ke, Fujiwara Nan-ke, Fujiwara Kyō-ke and Fujiwara Shiki-ke.

During the time of Fujiwara no Fuyutsugu, the Hok-ke became prosperous after Fuyutsugu was appointed kurōdo-no-tō (Head Chamberlain). His son Fujiwara no Yoshifusa became the first sesshō (regent in the place of a child Emperor), and his son, Fujiwara no Mototsune, became kampaku (regent in the place of an adult Emperor). After that, members of the Hokke continued to have a strong relationship with the Imperial Family by marrying Hokke daughters to the emperors. This allowed them to exclude other families and monopolize the regent position.

The Hok-ke prospered during the time of Fujiwara no Michinaga and Yorimichi. In the Kamakura period, Hok-ke split into the Five regent houses, Konoe, Takatsukasa, Kujō, Ichijō, and Nijō. These families continued to monopolize the regency until the Meiji Restoration in 1868. When the regency was abolished, a new hereditary peerage (kazoku) was established, and these houses were all appointed as Duke.

== Notable members ==
- Murasaki Shikibu
- Fujiwara no Teika
- Fujiwara no Michinaga
- Fujiwara no Fuyutsugu
- Fujiwara no Yoshifusa
- Fujiwara no Mototsune
- Fujiwara no Tokihira
- Fujiwara no Atsutada
- Fujiwara no Sukemasa
- Fujiwara no Kintō
- Fujiwara no Kiyosuke
- Lady Ise
- Fujiwara no Michitsuna's mother
- Fujiwara no Michimasa
- Fujiwara no Koretada
- Fujiwara no Yoshitaka
- Fujiwara no Yorimichi
- Fujiwara no Yukinari
- Fujiwara no Sanekata
- Fujiwara no Sadayori
- Fujiwara no Ietaka
- Fujiwara no Mototoshi
- Fujiwara no Sadakata
- Fujiwara no Asatada
- Fujiwara no Tadamichi
- Fujiwara no Sadanaga
- Fujiwara no Atsuyori

== See also ==
- Northern Fujiwara
- Nanke (Fujiwara)
- Shikike
- Kyōke
- Fujiwara clan
