= Fujiwara no Maro =

Japanese noble

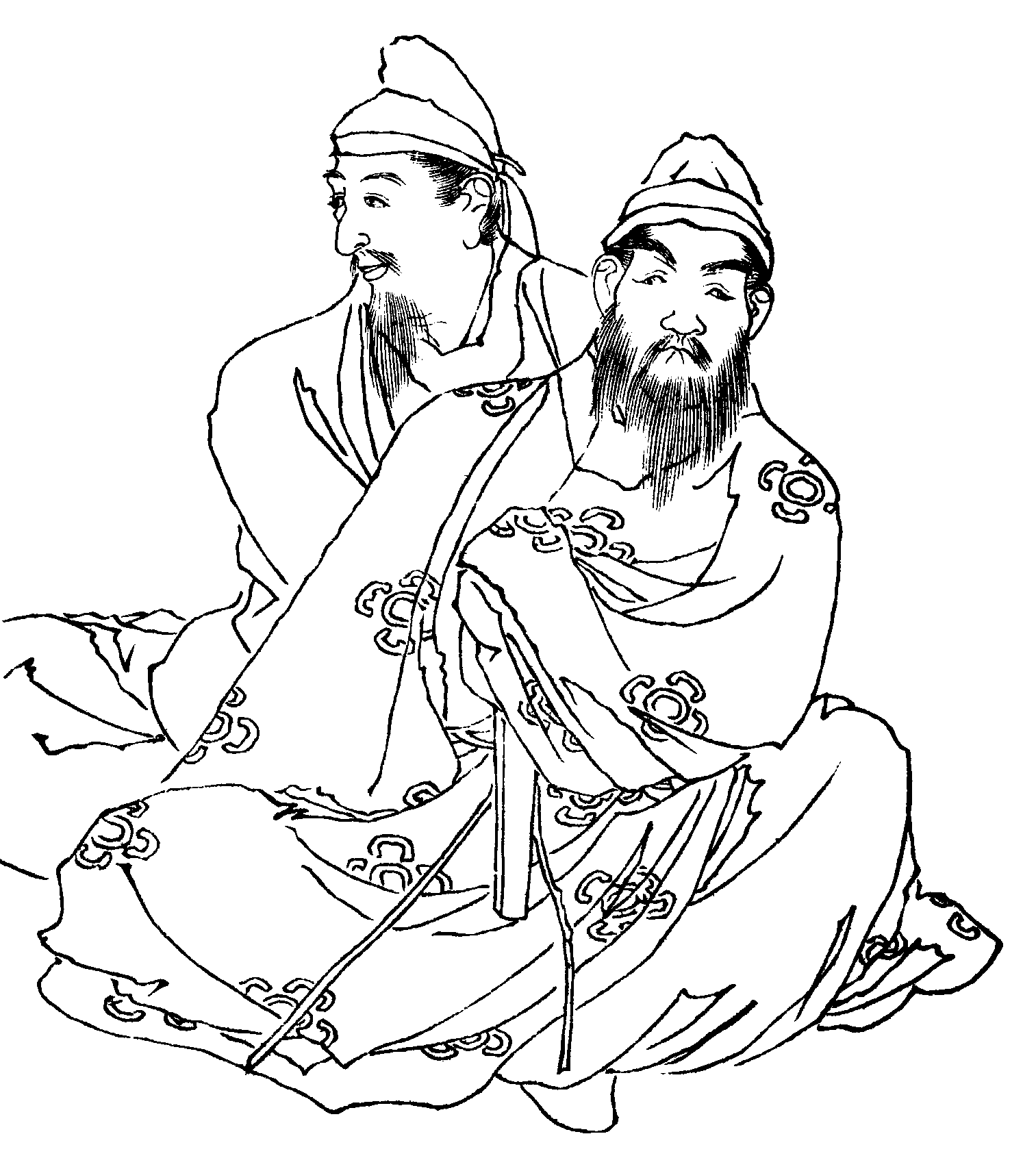
- Fujiwara no Muchimaro and Fujiwara no Maro, from Zenken Kojitsu
- Native name: 藤原 麻呂
- Other names: Banri (万里)
- Born: 695
- Died: 17 August 737
- Spouse: Many
- Issue: Fujiwara no Momoyoshi; Fujiwara no Hamanari; Fujiwara no Tsunatori; Fujiwara no Katsuhito
- Father: Fujiwara no Fuhito
- Mother: Ioe no Iratsume

Notes
- Relatives; Fujiwara no Fusasaki (brother); Fujiwara no Muchimaro (brother); Fujiwara no Miyako (brother); Fujiwara no Nagako (brother); Fujiwara no Umakai (brother); Empress Kōmyō (sister); Fujiwara no Tabino (brother)

Fujiwara no Maro (藤原 麻呂; 695 – August 17, 737) was a Japanese statesman, courtier, and politician during the Nara period. Maro established the Kyōke branch of the Fujiwara clan.

== Career ==
Maro was a minister (sakyō no dayū) during the reign of Emperor Shōmu.

- 737 (Tenpyō 9, 7th month): Maro died at age 43. The 735–737 Japanese smallpox epidemic caused the death of Maro and all three of his brothers, all in the same year.

== Genealogy ==
This member of the Fujiwara clan was the son of Fujiwara no Fuhito. Maro had three brothers: Fusasaki, Muchimaro and Umakai. The four brothers are known for having established the "four houses" of the Fujiwara.

- Father: Fujiwara no Fuhito (藤原不比等, 659–720)
- Mother: Ioe-no-iratsume (五百重娘, ?–?), former wife of Emperor Tenmu.
  - Wife: Lady from the Taima clan (当麻氏)
    - Daughter: Fujiwara no Momoyoshi (藤原百能, 720–782)
  - Wife: name unknown, daughter of Inaba no Kimame (稲葉気豆)
    - 1st son: Fujiwara no Hamanari (藤原浜成, 724–790)
  - Children with unknown mother:
    - Son: Fujiwara no Tsunatora (藤原綱執)
    - Son: Fujiwara no Katsuhito (藤原勝人)
  - Possible wife: Ōtomo no Sakanoue-no-iratsume (大伴坂上郎女), daughter of Ōtomo no Yasumaro (大伴安麻呂).
