= Jisha-ryō =

Land allotted to support a temple or shrine in Japan

Jisha-ryō (寺社領) were territories controlled by Shinto shrines and Buddhist temples in Japan. Existing since the ancient times until 1875, they served as a financial foundation for the shrines and temples.

The manorial territories were governed by a daikan magistrate chosen among the clergy, and were largely independent from outside authority and taxation. However, they gradually lost their independence starting in the 16th century, and in 1875, all land outside the shrine and temple grounds was seized by the Japanese government.

== History ==
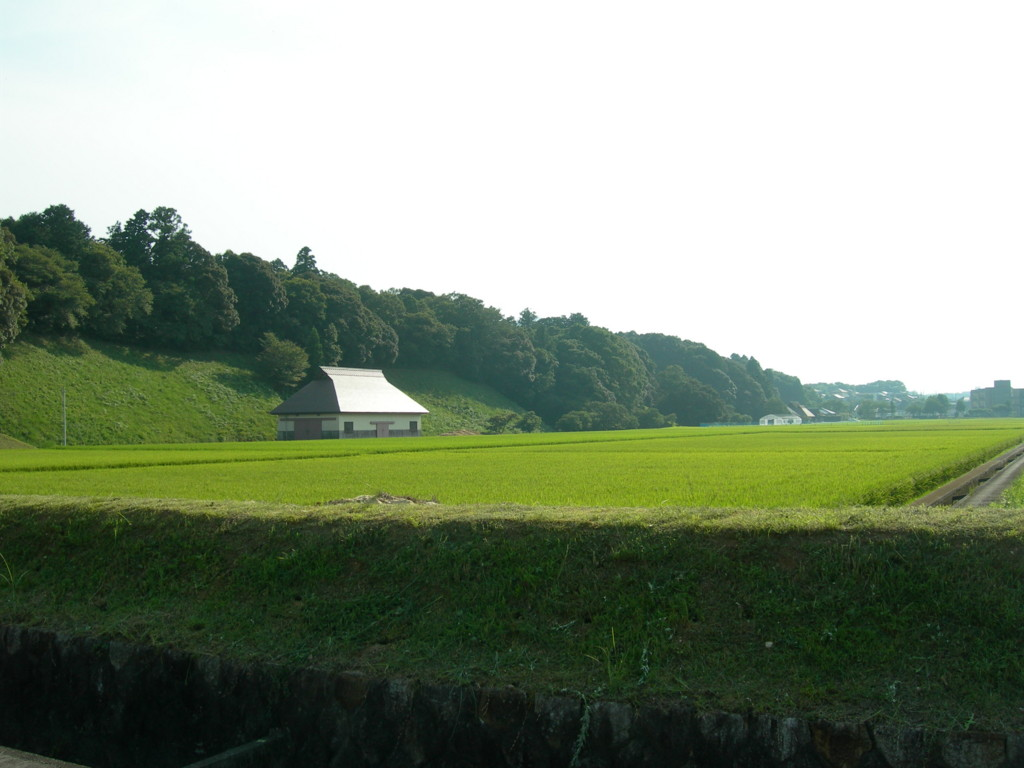
A kanda field of the Ise Grand Shrine

The jisha-ryō territories originated from the shrine fields (kanda) and the temple fields (terada) in ancient times before the Taika Reform in 645. After the Taika Reform, the shrine and temple fields were granted the right of tax exemption (fuyu no ken) under the ritsuryō system and the shrines and temples were given new vassal households (futo) by the Imperial Court.

In the mid-8th century, shrines and temples developed undeveloped regions into fields establishing feudal manors under their control. However, by the 9th and 10th century, most of these initial manors lost their original form and were developed by regional magnates as a form of contribution to the shrines and temples. These new contribution-type manors would become the most common type of jisha-ryō territory along with the manorialization of the vassal households. However, by the late 11th century, income from the court-issued vassal households was ceased, and powerful shrines and temples reorganized themselves to become economically self-reliant and independent from the central government.

The shrine and temple manors were independent from provincial governors. They were granted the right of tax exemption and the right of no-entry by outside authorities (funyū no ken), and sent their clergyman to govern the territory as a daikan magistrate (azukaridokoro). Local magnates were appointed as manorial officers to manage the manor.

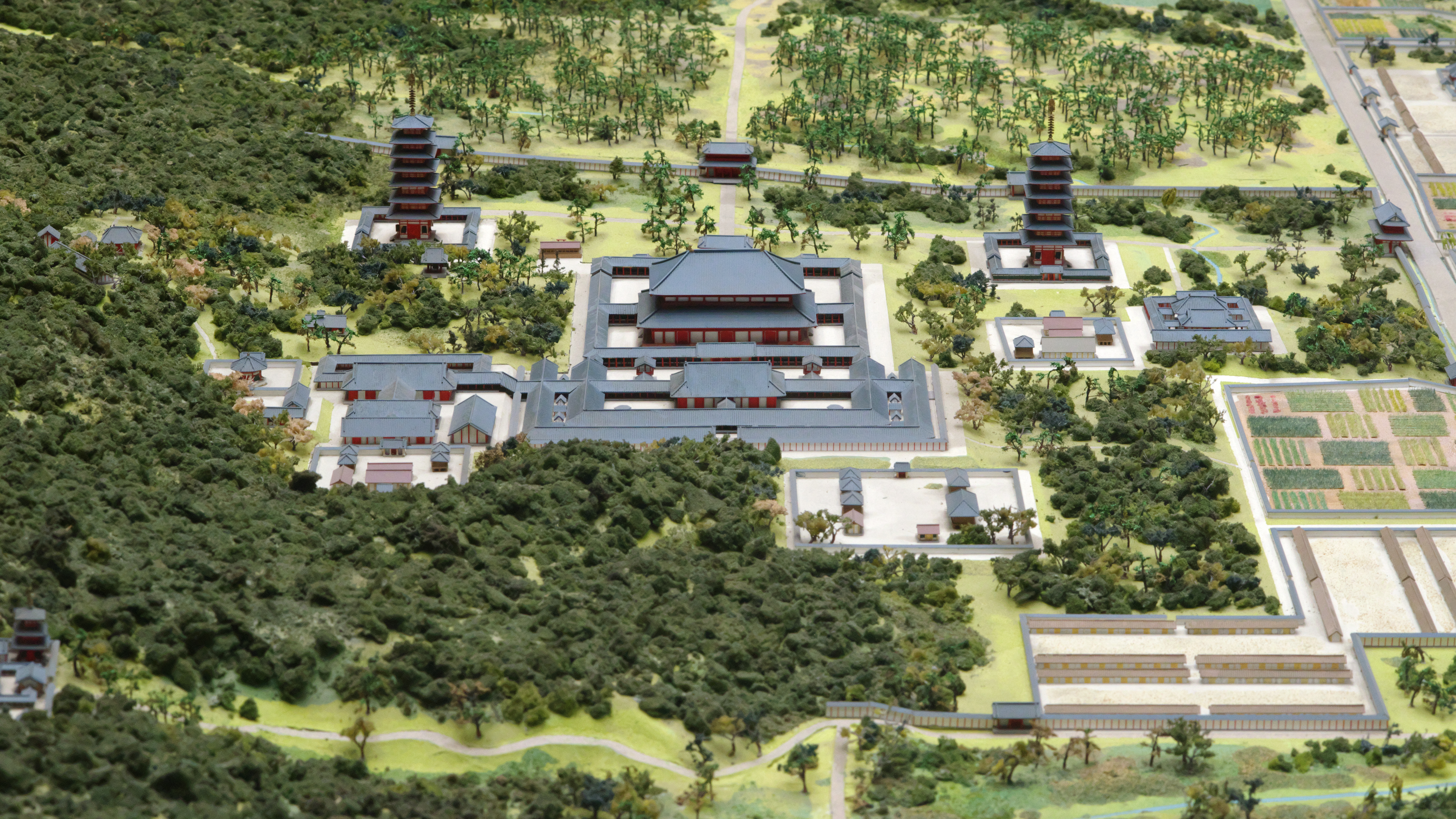
A model of Tōdai-ji temple c. 738 CE

In the 13th century, following the example of the Imperial family and court nobility, shrines and temples implemented a system of provincial fiefdoms with state authority. The provincial fiefdoms were funded by national-like scale construction budgets, just like during the division of Suō Province as part of the reconstruction of Tōdai-ji temple.

After the 13th century, the number of manors decreased due to samurai invasions and the shitaji chūbun (physical division of land). Instead, in response to the growing monetary economy, toll fees were collected by establishing tolls at important river and port locations, gradually becoming an ordinary part of jisha-ryō.

Since the Muromachi period, manors and provincial territories decreased, and under the Oda and Toyotomi administrations, all jisha-ryō became the target of land surveying and lost their political independence. Ever since, throughout the Edo period, the jisha-ryō became shuinchi (temple territory authorized by the Edo Shorgunate) and kokuinchi (shrine and temple territory authorized by the Daimyo), and thus came under the control of the Shogunate or a Daimyo.

After the Meiji Restoration in 1875, all land owned by shrines and temples, apart from the shrine and temple grounds, was seized by the Japanese government in accordance to the 1873 Land Tax Reform.

== See also ==
- Shōen
- Shake (social class)
