= Fujiwara Nan-ke =

Clan during Feudal Japan

Fujiwara 藤原 (南家)
- Mon: Sagarifuji
- Home province: Yamato Province, Yamashiro Province
- Parent house: Fujiwara clan
- Titles: Various
- Founder: Fujiwara no Muchimaro
- Founding year: 8th century
- Cadet branches: Kudō; Itō; Nikaidō; Sagara; Kikkawa; Numerous others

The Fujiwara Nan-ke (藤原南家; lit. Fujiwara southern house) was a cadet branch of the Fujiwara clan of Japan.

== History ==
It was founded by Fujiwara no Muchimaro. Muchimaro had three brothers: Fusasaki, Maro and Umakai. These four brothers are known for having established the "four houses" of the Fujiwara.

The epithet Nan-ke ("southern house") comes from the fact that Muchimaro's mansion was located south of the mansion of his younger brother. The Nanke served in the imperial court, but many of Fujiwara no Tamenori's descendants later became samurai families such as Itō, Nikaidō, Sagara and Kudō.

== Nara period ==
The founder of Fujiwara Nanke, Fujiwara no Muchimaro, was the eldest son of Fujiwara no Fuhito. Shortly after the beginning of Nara period, Muchimaro became the head of Ministry of Civil Services in 718. When Fuhito died in 720, Prince Nagaya was at the highest rank in the state government. Prince Nagaya was grandson of Emperor Tenmu, but not a son of Fujiwara family, he was therefore seen as a threat by Muchimaro and his three brothers. After successfully removing Prince Nagaya in 729, Muchimaro rose to Dainagon, "Counselor of the first rank". In 734, he was promoted to Udaijin or "Minister of the Right", and in 737, he was made Sadaijin or "Minister of the Left".

Nanke further prospered in the Nara period as Nakamaro, the second son of Muchimaro, gained the trust of Empress Kōken and was given the name Emi no Oshikatsu.

Tachibana no Naramaro, who was unhappy about Nakamaro's monopolization of power, plotted a conspiracy to replace Nakamaro and to overthrow the Empress, but Nakamaro settled the rebellion and established dictatorship. However, Nakamaro was killed during Fujiwara no Nakamaro Rebellion after he attempted to overthrow the imperial family and become the emperor, after which Fujiwara Hok-ke replaced the Nan-ke as the leading house of Fujiwara.

== Notable members ==
- Fujiwara no Muchimaro
- Fujiwara no Nakamaro
- Fujiwara no Suenori
- Fujiwara no Toshiyuki
- Ukon
- Fujiwara no Michinori

== See also ==
- Hokke (Fujiwara)
- Shikike
- Kyōke
