= Fujiwara no Muchimaro =

Japanese politician of the Asuka and Nara periods

Ason Fujiwara no Muchimaro
- 藤原 武智麻呂
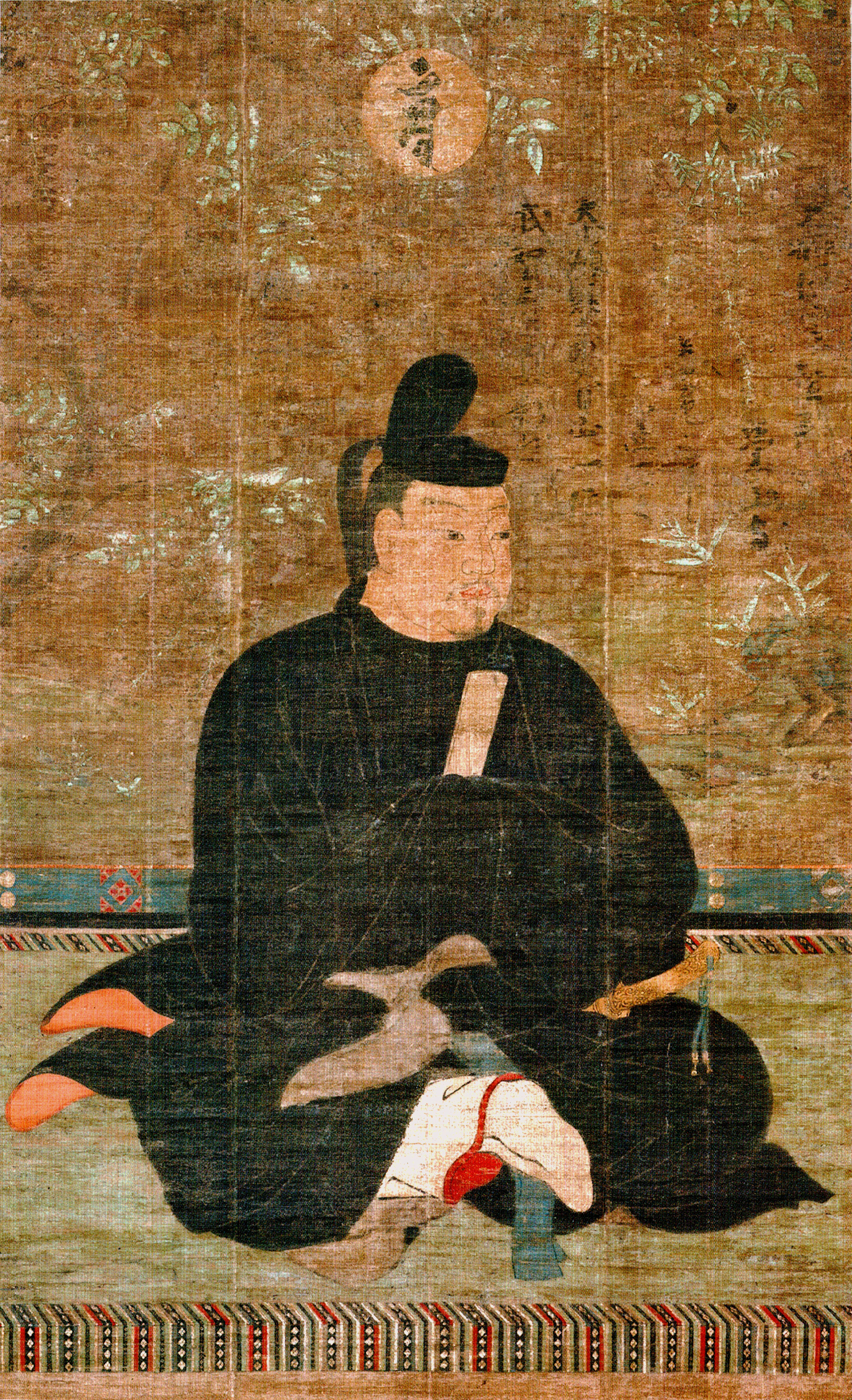
- Fujiwara no Muchimaro

Minister of the Left
- In office August 28, 737 – August 29, 737
- Monarch: Emperor Shōmu

Minister of the Right
- In office 734 – August 737
- Monarch: Emperor Shōmu

Dainagon
- In office 729–734
- Monarch: Emperor Shōmu

Head of Ministry of Civil Services
- In office 718–729
- Monarch: Empress Genshō

Personal details
- Born: 680
- Died: August 29, 737
- Cause of death: smallpox
- Spouse: Sada-hime
- Children: Fujiwara no Toyonari; Fujiwara no Nakamaro; Fujiwara no Otomaro; Fujiwara no Kosemaro; Minamidono (consort of Emperor Shōmu)
- Parent(s): Fujiwara no Fuhito, Soga no Shōshi
- Occupation: kuge, politician

Fujiwara no Muchimaro (藤原 武智麻呂; 680 – August 29, 737) was a Japanese courtier (kuge) and politician of the late Asuka and early Nara period. He founded the Nanke ("Southern") branch of the Fujiwara clan. His court rank is Senior First Rank.

== Life ==
Muchimaro was the eldest son of Fujiwara no Fuhito, and his mother Soga no Shōshi was the daughter of Soga no Murajiko.

He married a granddaughter of Abe no Miushi, with whom he had two sons Fujiwara no Toyonari and Fujiwara no Nakamaro. Among his daughters was a consort of Emperor Shōmu.

Muchimaro became the head of Ministry of Civil Services in 718. When Fuhito, Muchimaro's father, died in 720, Prince Nagaya was at the highest rank in the state government. Prince Nagaya was a grandson of Emperor Tenmu, but not a son of Fujiwara family, therefore was seen as a threat by Muchimaro and his three brothers. After successfully removing Prince Nagaya in 729, Muchimaro rose to Dainagon (Counselor of the first rank).

In 734, he was promoted to Udaijin or "Minister of the Right". In 737, he was made Sadaijin or "Minister of the Left", but died of smallpox the following day in the 735–737 Japanese smallpox epidemic.

The History of the Fujiwara House (Tōshi Kaden 藤氏家伝) included his biography and states the following: "Muchimaro, the Fujiwara Great Minister of the Left, was a man from the Sakyō district. He was the oldest son of the Head of the Council of State Fuhito, and his mother was a daughter of the Soga Great Minister of the Treasury. He was born in the mansion at Ōhara on the fifteenth day of the fourth month of 680, the ninth year since the enthronement of the sovereign Tenmu. Because he cultivated righteousness, he received this name."

== Fujiwara no Muchimaro grave ==
Fujiwara no Muchimaro's grave is located in the Kojima-chō neighborhood of the city of Gojō, Nara. It is located on the mountain behind Eizan-ji, a Shingon Buddhism temple facing the Yoshino River. Fujiwara no Muchimaro was cremated at Sahoyama, north of Heijō-kyō but his son Nakamaro is said to have reburied him here. The Engishiki states that the grave was placed in Atada, Uchi County, Yamato Province. It was designated a National Historic Site in 1940. The grave is a square with sides of 7 to 8 meters, surrounded by rectangular green schist stones mined in the area, and a gravestone erected in 1693 was erected within it. During the Meiji period, an ossuary was discovered nearby.

- Father: Fujiwara no Fuhito
- Mother: Soga no Shōshi (蘇我娼子, ?–?), daughter of Soga no Murajiko (蘇我連子).
  - Main Wife: Sada-hime (阿倍貞媛, 阿倍貞吉 or 阿倍真虎), granddaughter of Abe no Miushi (阿倍御主人).
    - 1st son: Fujiwara no Toyonari (藤原豊成, 704–765)
    - 2nd son: Fujiwara no Nakamaro (藤原 仲麻呂, 706–764)
  - Wife: name unknown, daughter of Ki no Maro (紀麻呂).
    - 3rd son: Fujiwara no Otomaro (藤原乙麻呂, ?–760?)
  - Wife: (阿祢姫), daughter of (小治田功麻呂).
    - 4th son: Fujiwara no Kosemaro (藤原巨勢麻呂, ?–764)
  - Wife: name unknown
    - Daughter: Minamidono (南殿, ?–748), consort of Emperor Shōmu.

== See also ==
- Fujiwara Nanke
- Fujiwara no Nakamaro
- 735–737 Japanese smallpox epidemic
