= Fujiwara clan =

Powerful family of regents in Japan

Fujiwara 藤原
- Mon: Sagarifuji
- Home province: Yamato Province
- Parent house: Nakatomi clan of Ame-no-Koyane of legendary genealogy Izanagi
- Founder: Fujiwara no Kamatari
- Founding year: 668
- Cadet branches: Nanke Family; Hokke Family; Shikike Family; Kyōke Family

The Fujiwara clan (藤原氏, Fujiwara-shi or Fujiwara-uji; Japanese pronunciation: [ɸɯ̈̀.(ɟ̟͡)ʑí.β̞ä́.ɾä́]) was a powerful family of imperial regents in Japan, descending from the Nakatomi clan and, as legend held, through them their ancestral god Ame-no-Koyane. The Fujiwara prospered since ancient times and dominated the imperial court until the Meiji Restoration in 1868. They held the title of Ason. The abbreviated form is Tōshi or Tōji (藤氏; [tó̞ò̞.ɕì, -(ɟ̟͡)ʑì]).

The 8th century clan history Tōshi Kaden (藤氏家伝) states the following at the biography of the clan's patriarch, Fujiwara no Kamatari (614–669): "Kamatari, the Inner Palace Minister who was also called ‘Chūrō,’ was a man of the Takechi district of Yamato Province. His forebears descended from Ame no Koyane no Mikoto; for generations they had administered the rites for Heaven and Earth, harmonizing the space between men and the gods. Therefore, it was ordered their clan was to be called Ōnakatomi."

The clan originated when the founder, Nakatomi no Kamatari (614–669) of the Nakatomi clan, was rewarded by Emperor Tenji with the honorific "Fujiwara" – after the wisteria (藤; fuji) field on Mount Tōno (in present-day Sakurai City) where Kamatari and the then-Prince Naka, whom he befriended in a game of kemari, conspired to eliminate the Soga clan – which evolved as a surname for Kamatari and his descendants. In time, Fujiwara became known as a clan name.

The Fujiwara dominated the Japanese politics of the Heian period (794–1185) through the monopoly of regent positions, Sesshō and Kampaku. The family's primary strategy for central influence was through the marrying of Fujiwara daughters to the Emperors. Through this, the Fujiwara would gain influence over the next emperor who would, according to family tradition of that time, be raised in the household of his mother's side and owe loyalty to his grandfather. As abdicated emperors took over power by exercising insei (院政, cloistered rule) at the end of the 11th century, then followed by the rise of the warrior class, the Fujiwara gradually lost its control over mainstream politics.

The Northern Fujiwara (Ōshū Fujiwara) ruled the Tōhoku region (northeast Honshū) of Japan during the 12th century.

Beyond the 12th century, they continued to monopolize the titles of Sesshō and Kampaku for much of the time until the system was abolished in the Meiji era. Though their influence declined, the clan remained close advisors to the succeeding Emperors.

== Asuka and Nara period ==
Fujiwara and Imperial Intermarriage Chart

(brothers)
Fujiwara no Kamatari	Empress Jitō; 41st Emperor	Emperor Tenmu; 40th Emperor	Emperor Tenji; 38th Emperor
Fujiwara no Fuhito	Empress Genmei; 43rd Emperor	Prince Kusakabe	Prince Takechi	Princess Minabe
Maro (Kyōke)	Umakai (Shikike)	Fusasaki (Hokke)	Muchimaro (Nanke)	Miyako (宮子)	Emperor Monmu; 42nd Emperor	Prince Nagaya
Empress Kōmyō	Emperor Shōmu; 45th Emperor

The Fujiwara clan's political influence was initiated during the Asuka period. Nakatomi no Kamatari, a member of the lower-nobility Nakatomi family led a coup against the Soga in 645 and initiated a series of sweeping government reforms that would be known as the Taika Reform. In 668 Emperor Tenji (reigned 668–671), bestowed the kabane Fujiwara no Ason (藤原朝臣) on Kamatari. The surname passed to the descendants of Fujiwara no Fuhito (659–720), the second son and heir of Kamatari, who was prominent at the court of several emperors and empresses during the early Nara period. He made his daughter Miyako a concubine of Emperor Monmu. Her son, Prince Obito became Emperor Shōmu. Fuhito succeeded in making another of his daughters, Kōmyōshi, the empress consort of Emperor Shōmu. She was the first empress consort of Japan who was not a daughter of the imperial family itself. Fuhito had four sons; and each of them became the progenitor of a cadet branch of the clan:

- the Hokke or Northern branch founded by Fujiwara no Fusasaki
- the Kyōke branch founded by Fujiwara no Maro
- the Nanke or Southern branch founded by Fujiwara no Muchimaro
- the Shikike branch founded by Fujiwara no Umakai

Among them, the Hokke came to be considered as the leaders of the entire clan. All four brothers died in 737 during a major smallpox epidemic in Japan.

== Heian period ==
During the Heian period of Japanese history, the Hokke managed to establish a hereditary claim to the position of regent, either for an underage emperor (sesshō) or for an adult one (kampaku). Some prominent Fujiwaras occupied these positions more than once, and for more than one emperor. Lesser members of the Fujiwara were court nobles, provincial governors and vice governors, members of the provincial aristocracy, and samurai. The Fujiwara was one of the four great families that dominated Japanese politics during the Heian Period (794–1185), and the most important of them at that time. The others were the Tachibana, the Taira and the Minamoto. The Fujiwara exercised tremendous power, especially during the period of regency governments in the 10th and 11th centuries, having many emperors as practically puppet monarchs.

The Fujiwara dominated the government of Japan 794–1160. There is no clear starting point of their dominance. However, their domination of civil administration was lost by the establishment of the first shogunate (i.e., Kamakura shogunate) under Minamoto no Yoritomo in 1192.

Fujiwara princes initially served as highest ministers of the imperial Court (kampaku) and regents (sesshō) for underage monarchs. The Fujiwara were the proverbial "power behind the throne" for centuries. Apparently they never aspired to supplant the imperial dynasty. Instead, the clan's influence stemmed from its matrimonial alliances with the imperial family. Because consorts of crown princes, younger sons, and emperors were generally Fujiwara women, the male heads of the Fujiwara house were often the father-in-law, brother-in-law, uncle, or maternal grandfather of the emperor. The family reached the peak of its power under Fujiwara no Michinaga (966–1027). He was the grandfather of three emperors, the father of six empresses or imperial consorts, and the grandfather of seven additional imperial consorts; it is no exaggeration to say that it was Michinaga who ruled Japan during this period, not the titular Emperors. As a result of these unusually strong familial links, Michinaga never took the title of Kampaku—he held more than the power that the position would bring, and had no need of the title.

The Fujiwara clan is featured prominently in The Pillow Book, by Sei Shōnagon, and the character of Genji is partially based on Michinaga in the eponymous Tale of Genji.

=== Fujiwara regime in the Heian period ===
The Fujiwara Regency was the main feature of government during most of the Heian era. Kyoto (Heian-kyō) was geopolitically a better seat of government; with good river access to the sea, it could be reached by land routes from the eastern provinces.

Just before the move to the Heian-kyō, the Emperor had abolished universal conscription in the eighth century and soon local, private militaries came into being. The Fujiwara and the clans of Taira and Minamoto created later during the ninth century were among the most prominent families supported by the new military class.

In the ninth and tenth centuries, much authority was lost to the great families, who disregarded the Chinese-style land and tax systems imposed by the government in Kyoto. Stability came to Heian Japan, but, even though succession was ensured for the Imperial family through heredity, power again concentrated in the hands of one noble family, the Fujiwara.

Family administrations now became public institutions. As the most powerful family, the Fujiwara governed Japan and determined the general affairs of state, such as succession to the throne. Family and state affairs were thoroughly intermixed, a pattern followed among other families, monasteries, and even the imperial family.

As the Soga had taken control of the throne in the sixth century, the Fujiwara by the ninth century had intermarried with the imperial family, and one of their members was the first head of the Emperor's Private Office. While the earliest parts of the Heian period was marked by unusually strong emperors governing themselves (in particular from Emperor Kanmu to Emperor Saga (781–823)), the Fujiwara started to rebuild their influence first under Fujiwara no Fuyutsugu in the first half of the ninth century. Fuyutsugu's son Fujiwara no Yoshifusa was the first person not from the imperial family to become regent for a minor emperor when he gained that position when his grandson was enthroned as Emperor Seiwa in 858. His adopted son, Fujiwara no Mototsune, had himself further appointed kampaku (regent for an adult emperor, a newly invented position). After Mototsune's death Emperor Uda (who was not the son of a Fujiwara daughter) managed to regain control of much of government. However, after abdicating in favour of his son, Emperor Daigo (897–930), while apparently intending to control government from retirement, Mototsune's son Fujiwara no Tokihira managed to maneuver himself back to very prominent position until his early death in 909. The remaining period of Daigo's reign was again relatively free from Fujiwara dominance, but from the beginning of the reign of his son Emperor Suzaku, the Fujiwara again re-established their dominance of the court with the leadership of Fujiwara no Tadahira.

Nevertheless, the Fujiwara were not demoted by Emperor Daigo but in many ways became stronger during his reign. Central control of Japan had continued to decline, and the Fujiwara, along with other great families and religious foundations, acquired ever larger shōen and greater wealth during the early tenth century. By the early Heian period, the shōen had obtained legal status, and the large religious establishments sought clear titles in perpetuity, waiver of taxes, and immunity from government inspection of the shōen they held. Those people who worked the land found it advantageous to transfer title to shōen holders in return for a share of the harvest. People and lands were increasingly beyond central control and taxation, a de facto return to conditions before the Taika Reform.

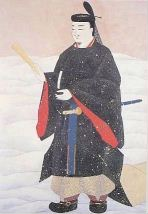
Fujiwara no Michinaga (966–1028)

Within decades of Emperor Daigo's death, the Fujiwara had absolute control over the court. By the year 1000, Fujiwara no Michinaga was able to enthrone and dethrone emperors at will. Little authority was left for traditional officialdom, and government affairs were handled through the Fujiwara family's private administration. The Fujiwara had become what historian George B. Sansom has called "hereditary dictators".

The Fujiwara presided over a period of cultural and artistic flowering at the imperial court and among the aristocracy. There was great interest in graceful poetry and vernacular literature. Japanese writing had long depended on Chinese ideograms (kanji), but these were now supplemented by kana, two types of phonetic Japanese script: katakana, a mnemonic device using parts of Chinese ideograms; and hiragana, a cursive form of kanji writing and an art form in itself. Hiragana gave written expression to the spoken word and, with it, to the rise in Japan's famous vernacular literature, much of it written by court women who had not been trained in Chinese as had their male counterparts. Three late tenth century and early eleventh century women presented their views of life and romance at the Heian court in Kagerō Nikki ("The Gossamer Years") by "the mother of Michitsuna", Makura no Sōshi (The Pillow Book) by Sei Shōnagon, and Genji Monogatari (Tale of Genji) by Murasaki Shikibu (herself a Fujiwara). Indigenous art also flourished under the Fujiwara after centuries of imitating Chinese forms. Vividly colored yamato-e (Japanese style) paintings of court life and stories about temples and shrines became common in the mid and late Heian periods, setting patterns for Japanese art to this day.

Decline in food production, growth of the population, and competition for resources among the great families all led to the gradual decline of Fujiwara power and gave rise to military disturbances in the mid-tenth and eleventh centuries. Members of the Fujiwara, Taira, and Minamoto families – all of whom had descended from the imperial family – attacked one another, claimed control over vast tracts of conquered land, set up rival regimes, and generally broke the peace of Japan.

The Fujiwara controlled the throne until the reign of Emperor Go-Sanjō (1068–73), the first emperor not born of a Fujiwara mother since the ninth century. Emperor Go-Sanjō, determined to restore imperial control through strong personal rule, implemented reforms to curb Fujiwara influence. He also established an office to compile and validate estate records with the aim of reasserting central control. Many shōen were not properly certified, and large landholders, like the Fujiwara, felt threatened with the loss of their lands. Emperor Go-Sanjō also established the In no chō, or Office of the Cloistered Emperor, which was held by a succession of emperors who abdicated to devote themselves to behind-the-scenes governance, or insei (Cloistered rule).

The In no chō filled the void left by the decline of Fujiwara power. Rather than being banished, the Fujiwara were mostly retained in their old positions of civil dictator and minister of the center while being bypassed in decision making. In time, many of the Fujiwara were replaced, mostly by members of the rising Minamoto family. While the Fujiwara fell into disputes among themselves and formed northern and southern factions, the insei system allowed the paternal line of the imperial family to gain influence over the throne. The period from 1086 to 1156 was the age of supremacy of the In no chō and of the rise of the military class throughout the country. Military might rather than civil authority dominated the government.

A struggle for succession in the mid-twelfth century gave the Fujiwara an opportunity to regain their former power. Fujiwara no Yorinaga sided with the retired emperor in a violent battle in 1158 against the heir apparent, who was supported by the Taira and Minamoto. In the end, the Fujiwara were destroyed, the old system of government supplanted, and the insei system left powerless as bushi took control of court affairs, marking a turning point in Japanese history. Within a year, the Taira and Minamoto clashed, and a twenty-year period of Taira ascendancy began. The Taira were seduced by court life and ignored problems in the provinces. Finally, Minamoto no Yoritomo (1147–99) rose from his headquarters at Kamakura (in the Kantō region, southwest of modern Tokyo) to defeat the Taira, and with them the child emperor Emperor Antoku they controlled, in the Genpei War (1180–85).

After this downfall, the younger branches of the Fujiwara clan turned their focus from politics to the arts, producing literary scholars including Fujiwara no Shunzei and Fujiwara no Teika.

=== Decline ===
Only forty years after Michinaga's death, his Fujiwara heirs were not able to prevent the accession of Emperor Go-Sanjō (reigned 1068–73), the first emperor since Emperor Uda whose mother was not a Fujiwara. The system of government by retired emperor (daijō tennō) (cloistered rule) beginning from 1087 further weakened the Fujiwara's control over the Imperial Court.

The Fujiwara-dominated Heian period approached its end along disturbances of 12th century. The dynastic struggle known as the Hōgen Disturbance (Hōgen no Ran) led to the Taira emerging as the most powerful clan in 1156. During the Heiji Disturbance (Heiji no Ran) in 1160 the Taira defeated the coalition of Fujiwara and Minamoto forces. This defeat marked the end of the Fujiwara's dominance.

== Split and enduring influence ==
During the 13th century, the Fujiwara Hok-ke was split into five regent houses: Konoe, Takatsukasa, Kujō, Nijō and Ichijō.

They had a "monopoly" to the offices of sesshō and kampaku, and served in turn. The political power had shifted away from the court nobility in Kyoto to the new warrior class in the countryside. However, Fujiwara remained close advisers, regents and ministers to the emperors for centuries; the family retained political reputation and influence even until the 20th century (such as Fumimaro Konoe and Morihiro Hosokawa, who became the Prime Ministers). As such, they had a certain political power and much influence, as often the rival warriors and later bakufu sought their alliance. Oda Nobunaga and his sister Oichi claimed to have descent from the Taira and Fujiwara clans; regent Toyotomi Hideyoshi and shogun Tokugawa Ieyasu were related by marriage to various families from Fujiwara clan. Empress Shōken, wife of Emperor Meiji, was a descendant of the Fujiwara clan.

Until the marriage of the Crown Prince Hirohito (Emperor Shōwa) to Princess Nagako of Kuni (posthumously Empress Kōjun) in January 1924, the principal consorts of emperors and crown princes had often been recruited from one of the Sekke Fujiwara. Imperial princesses were often married to Fujiwara lords – throughout a millennium at least. As recently as Emperor Shōwa's third daughter, the former Princess Kazuko and Prince Mikasa's elder daughter, the former Princess Yasuko, married into Takatsukasa and Konoe families, respectively. Likewise a daughter of the last shōgun married a second cousin of Emperor Shōwa.

== See also ==
- Cloistered rule
- History of Japan
- Lists of incumbents
- Minamoto
- Sesshō
- Shōgun
- Tachibana
- Taira
- Tōshi Kaden, an early bibliographic clan record
