= Fujiwara no Yoshimi =

Japanese noble (813–867)

Fujiwara no Yoshimi 藤原良相
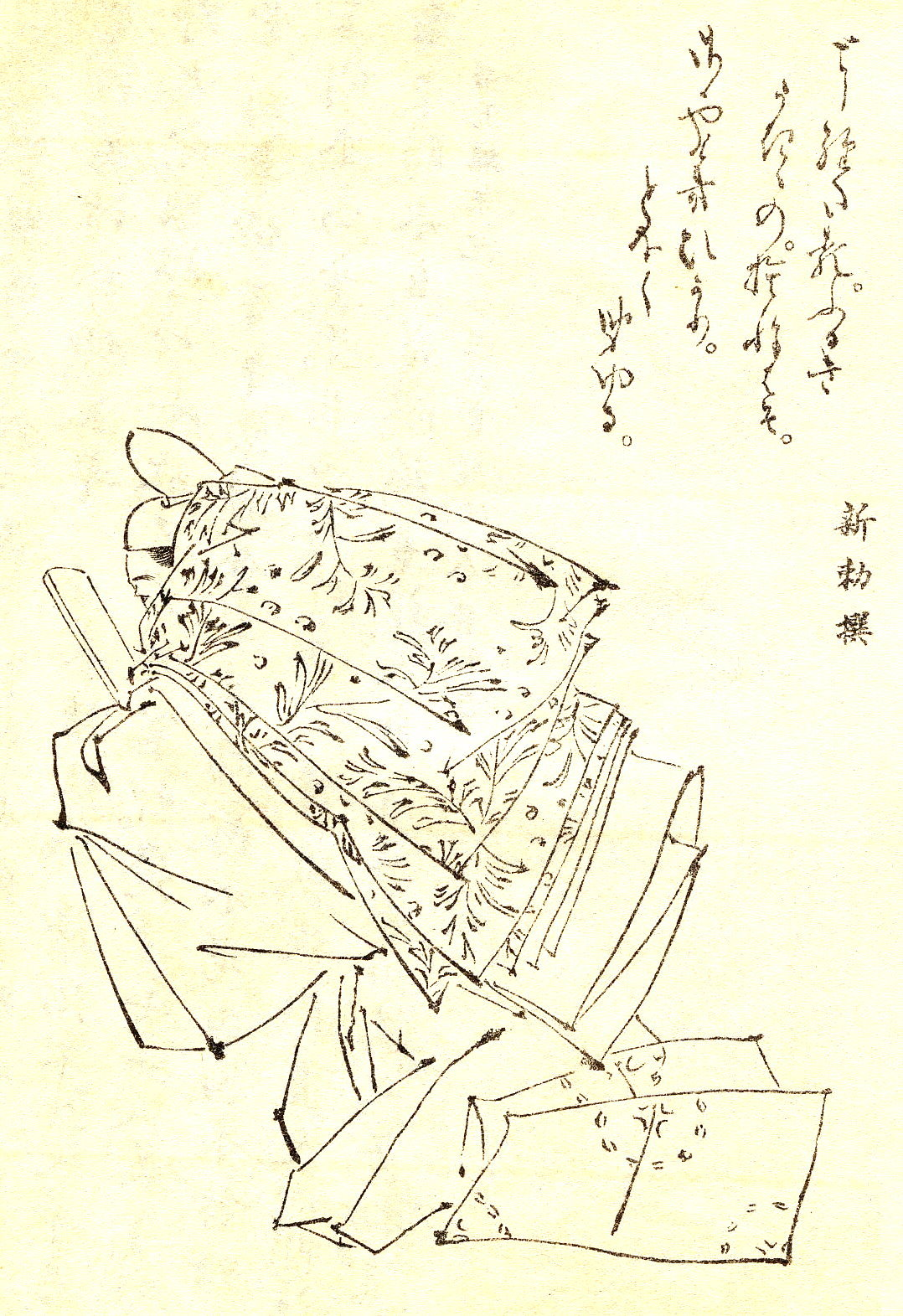
- Illustration by Kikuchi Yōsai, from Zenken Kojitsu
- Born: 813
- Died: November 9, 867
- Family: Fujiwara Hokke
- Father: Fujiwara no Fuyutsugu

Fujiwara no Yoshimi (藤原 良相; 813 – November 9, 867) was a Japanese noble of the early Heian period. He was the fifth son of the sadaijin Fujiwara no Fuyutsugu of the Fujiwara Hokke and the uncle of Emperor Montoku. He reached the court rank of shō ni-i (正二位) and the position of udaijin, and was posthumously granted the rank of shō ichi-i (正一位). He was also known as Nishisanjō-Daijin (西三条大臣).

== Life ==
Studying at college in his youth, he possessed a quick tongue. In 834, Emperor Ninmyō summoned him and appointed Yoshimi to serve him personally as a private secretary (六位蔵人) and captain in the imperial guard (右兵衛権大尉). He was steadily promoted in the court. In 838 he was bestowed the rank of ju go-i no ge (従五位下), in 840 promoted to major general in the guard (左近衛少将), in 841 to ju go-i no jō (従五位上), in 843 to shō go-i no ge (正五位下) and governor of Awa province, in 844 to director of the kurōdo-dokoro, and in 846 to ju shi-i no ge (従四位下) and lieutenant general in the guard (左近衛中将). In 842, he also led 40 troops in surrounding Prince Tsunesada in the succession dispute known as the Jōwa Incident. Finally, in 848, he joined the ranks of the kugyō with a promotion to sangi.

In 850, Yoshimi's nephew Crown Prince Michiyasu took the throne as Emperor Montoku. Yoshimi was promoted to shō shi-i no ge (正四位下) and appointed as master of the Crown Prince's Quarters (春宮大夫). In 851 he surpassed his brother Nagara, who had been first to make sangi, with a promotion to chūnagon, receiving the rank of ju san-mi (従三位) in the same year. In 854, he was promoted again to dainagon and general in the imperial guard (右近衛大将). In 857, when his brother Yoshifusa was made daijō-daijin, Yoshimi filled his old rank of udaijin. In 859, he was promoted to shō ni-i (正二位).

In 864 Yoshimi sent his daughter Tamiko as a bride to Emperor Seiwa. Yoshimi's older and more powerful brother Yoshifusa was cautious of his popularity and success. In the Ōtenmon Incident of 866, Yoshimi ordered Minamoto no Makoto's arrest based on the testimony of Tomo no Yoshio, but Yoshifusa protested Makoto's innocence and prevented it. After this, Yoshimi lost most of his political influence.

In 867, Yoshimi suddenly became ill in his chambers, and died that same month. He was posthumously granted the rank of shō ichi-i (正一位). In accordance with his will, he was given a simple burial, his coffin covered with just a single sheet.

== Personality and anecdotes ==
According to the Nihon Sandai Jitsuroku, Yoshimi was magnanimous and excelled since childhood. A deep believer in Buddhism, his long habit of abstaining from meat and eating simple food meant that all his life he was extremely thin.

The same text records a number of anecdotes about his life, as follow:

- Once, when Emperor Ninmyō had boiled some medicine to remove its impurities, he ordered his retainers to taste it to determine its consistencies. Nervous, nobody would try it, but Yoshimi took the cup and drank it all. Ninmyō is said to have praised Yoshimi for respecting his duty to his master.
- Yoshimi studied Buddhist writings and was familiar with the Shingon school. When his wife died in Yoshimi's thirties, he immersed himself in prayer to shake off his desires and never remarried.

== Legends ==
The Konjaku Monogatarishū contains a story in which Yoshimi defends Ono no Takamura who was still a student, when the latter is accused of a crime. Later, Yoshimi dies of sickness and is taken before Enma in Hell. Takamura, now working in Enma's palace as a retainer and assisting in his judgments, intervenes, and Yoshimi is forgiven and returned to life.

== Genealogy ==
- Father: Fujiwara no Fuyutsugu
- Mother: Fujiwara no Mitsuko (藤原美都子), daughter of Fujiwara no Matsukuri (藤原真作)
- Wife: Daughter of Ōe no Otoe (大江乙枝)
  - Eldest son: Fujiwara no Tokitsura (藤原常行; 836–875)
  - Son: Fujiwara no Yukikata (藤原行方)
  - Son: Fujiwara no Tadakata (藤原忠方)
- Other children:
  - Son: Fujiwara no Naokata (藤原直方)
  - Eldest daughter: Fujiwara no Takakiko (藤原多賀幾子; ?–858), court lady of Emperor Montoku
  - Daughter: Fujiwara no Tamiko (藤原多美子; ?–886), court lady of Emperor Seiwa
  - Daughter: wife of Mimatsu no Toshiyuki (三松俊行)

Although Yoshimi had many children, his eldest son Tokitsura died young after advancing to the rank of dainagon, and none of his other descendants were able to reach the level of kugyō. However, Yoshimi's obituary entry in the Nihon Sandai Jitsuroku does praise the talent and conduct of Tadakata and Naokata, and especially Tadakata's ability with clerical script. Yoshimi's brothers Yoshifusa and Nagara married their daughters to emperors Montoku and Seiwa and were thus able to become the grandfathers of the emperors born of those marriages, but while Yoshimi married off his daughters similarly, neither of them was fortunate enough to bear the emperor any children.
