= Ōtenmon Incident =

The Ōtenmon Conspiracy (応天門の変, Ōtenmon no Hen) was a conspiracy that took place in 866 and centered on the destruction of the main gate (Ōtenmon) of the Official Compound (朝堂院, Chōdō-in) of the Imperial Palace in Kyoto, Japan. This event is known to scholars today primarily based on the depiction of it in the narrative handscroll (emaki) called Ban Dainagon Ekotoba (The Picture-narrative of Great Minister Ban).

Minamoto no Makoto, a member of the powerful Minamoto clan, was accused by his political rival Tomo no Yoshio of having set the fire. However, Makoto had the support of the Daijō-daijin (Chancellor of the Realm) Fujiwara no Yoshifusa, and was cleared of the charges. Soon afterwards, however, a man claiming to have witnessed the event accused Tomo no Yoshio of setting the fire himself, along with his son. Yoshio was exiled to Izu.

This event, and Fujiwara no Yoshifusa's handling of it, served Yoshifusa well, politically. Many of those executed were his political rivals, and he found himself promoted to Regent (Sesshō) soon afterwards.

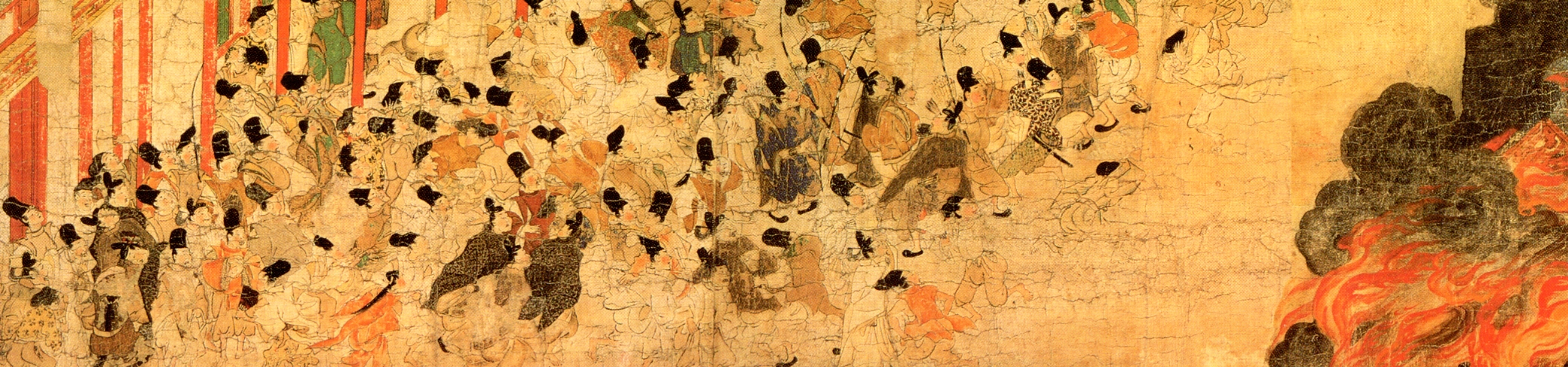
Section from the Ban Dainagon Ekotoba scroll, depicting the burning of Ōtenmon
