= Fujiwara no Yoshisuke =

- Born: 813
- Died: 867
- Parents: Fujiwara no Fuyutsugu (father)

Fujiwara no Yoshisuke (藤原 良輔; 813–867) was a Japanese statesman, courtier and politician during the Heian period.

== Career at court ==
He was a minister during the reign of Emperor Montoku.

- 857 (Ten'an 1, 2nd month): Yoshisuke was made udaijin.

Yoshisuke helped to write the Shoku Nihon Kōki.

== Genealogy ==
This member of the Fujiwara clan was the son of Fujiwara no Fuyutsugu. Yoshisuke's brothers were Fujiwara no Yoshifusa, Fujiwara no Nagayoshi and Fujiwara no Yoshikado.

He was father to Fujiwara no Tagakishi and Fujiwara no Tamishi.
