= Ban Dainagon Ekotoba =

12th century handscroll painting

Ban Dainagon Ekotoba (伴大納言絵詞; "The Tale of Great Minister Ban") is a late 12th-century emakimono (handscroll painting) depicting the events of the Ōtemmon Conspiracy, an event of Japan's early Heian period. The painting, attributed to Tokiwa Mitsunaga, is over 20 m (66 ft) long and about 31.5 cm (12.4 in) tall. The calligraphy has been attributed to the poet Fujiwara Norinaga.

== History ==
It is widely believed that these handscrolls were ordered by the retired Emperor Go-Shirakawa (1127-1192, r. 1155–1158) to pacify the angry spirit of Tomo no Yoshio after the imperial Ōtenmon burnt down during the Kyoto fire in 1177. Regardless of whether the scroll was made as a result of the fire in 1177, it appears that the intention of the scroll is to mollify Tomo no Yoshio's angry spirit.

== Description ==
The scroll itself depicts the events of the Ōtenmon conspiracy involving Tomo no Yoshio, which occurred on the tenth day of the third month of 866. Tomo no Yoshio's regret was emphasized in the scrolls through the written text in an attempt to protect against the vengeful will of Tomo no Yoshio's spirit.

The full-color painting depicts the events of the 3rd month of 866, in which Ban Dainagon, also known as Tomo no Yoshio, set fire to the Ōtemmon gate of Kyoto. He then blamed one of his political rivals, Minister of the left Minamoto no Makoto for the fire. However, the true culprit was soon discovered, and Tomo no Yoshio was banished to Izu Province.

Stylistically, the scroll is interesting because it is done using a combination of the otoko-e and tsukuri-e styles. Calligraphic lines are used to define figures, which characterizes the otoko-e style used in the shigisan-engi scroll. However, thick coats of bright colors are used in some scenes, typical of the tsukuri-e style used in the Genji Monogatari Emaki. Hideo Okudaira nonetheless classifies the Ban Dainagon Ekotoba as a strict example of otoko-e ("men's painting"), as opposed to the onna-e ("women's painting") style seen in works such as the Genji Monogatari Emaki, on account of its continuous sequence of scenes unbroken by text and its narrative focus on unfolding action. Techniques associated with the scroll also include hampuku byōsha, the repeated depiction of the same figure within a single scene to convey the passage of time, and fukinuki yatai, the omission of roofs to reveal building interiors, in addition to the layered, "built-up" application of the tsukuri-e technique described above.

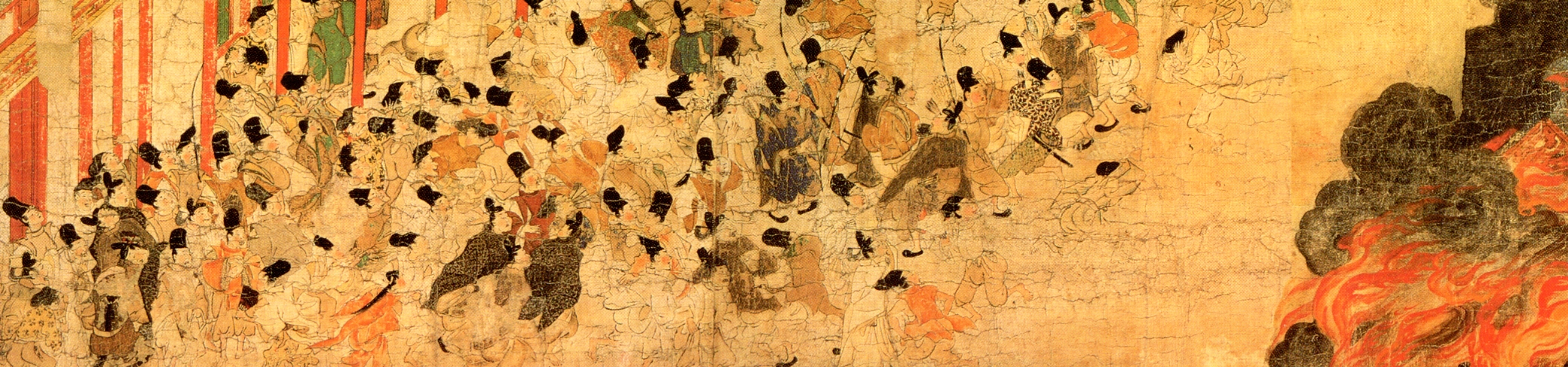
Section from the Ban Dainagon Ekotoba scroll

== Plot of the three scrolls ==
Vol. 1 — The first scroll illustrates the burning of the Otemmon gate while people tried to put out the flames, followed by the proof that Makoto was unjustly accused of his actions during the misunderstandings.

Vol. 2 — The Second scroll showcased the consolation to Makoto while he is praying to the gods and Buddha despite the fact that he did not do the actions which he was accused of. After that, they showed the suspicions about Tomo no Yoshio burning the gates. This imagery is rather indirect. It illustrates children arguing in the streets, later joined by their parents to abuse them and then gossiping amongst themselves about Tomo no Yoshio burning the gates.

Vol. 3 — The Third Scroll displays the arrest of Tomo no Yoshio as he is sent to exile. The picture indicates that Tomo no Yoshio had a servant who accidentally revealed the true culprit to the burning of the gate and after being arrested, he confessed to the police about what happened. The women in his mansion seemed morally weakened as they weep while Tomo no Yoshio is being taken to exile by the police in an ox cart.

== See also ==
- List of National Treasures of Japan (paintings)
