= 857 =

Calendar year

857 in various calendars
| Gregorian calendar | 857; DCCCLVII |
| Ab urbe condita | 1610 |
| Armenian calendar | 306; ԹՎ ՅԶ |
| Assyrian calendar | 5607 |
| Balinese saka calendar | 778–779 |
| Bengali calendar | 263–264 |
| Berber calendar | 1807 |
| Buddhist calendar | 1401 |
| Burmese calendar | 219 |
| Byzantine calendar | 6365–6366 |
| Chinese calendar | 丙子年 (Fire Rat); 3554 or 3347 — to — 丁丑年 (Fire Ox); 3555 or 3348 |
| Coptic calendar | 573–574 |
| Discordian calendar | 2023 |
| Ethiopian calendar | 849–850 |
| Hebrew calendar | 4617–4618 |
- Hindu calendars
| Vikram Samvat | 913–914 |
| Shaka Samvat | 778–779 |
| Kali Yuga | 3957–3958 |
| Holocene calendar | 10857 |
| Iranian calendar | 235–236 |
| Islamic calendar | 242–243 |
| Japanese calendar | Saikō 4 / Ten'an 1 (天安元年) |
| Javanese calendar | 754–755 |
| Julian calendar | 857; DCCCLVII |
| Korean calendar | 3190 |
| Minguo calendar | 1055 before ROC 民前1055年 |
| Nanakshahi calendar | −611 |
| Seleucid era | 1168/1169 AG |
| Thai solar calendar | 1399–1400 |
| Tibetan calendar | 阳火鼠年 (male Fire-Rat); 983 or 602 or −170 — to — 阴火牛年 (female Fire-Ox); 984 or 603 or −169 |

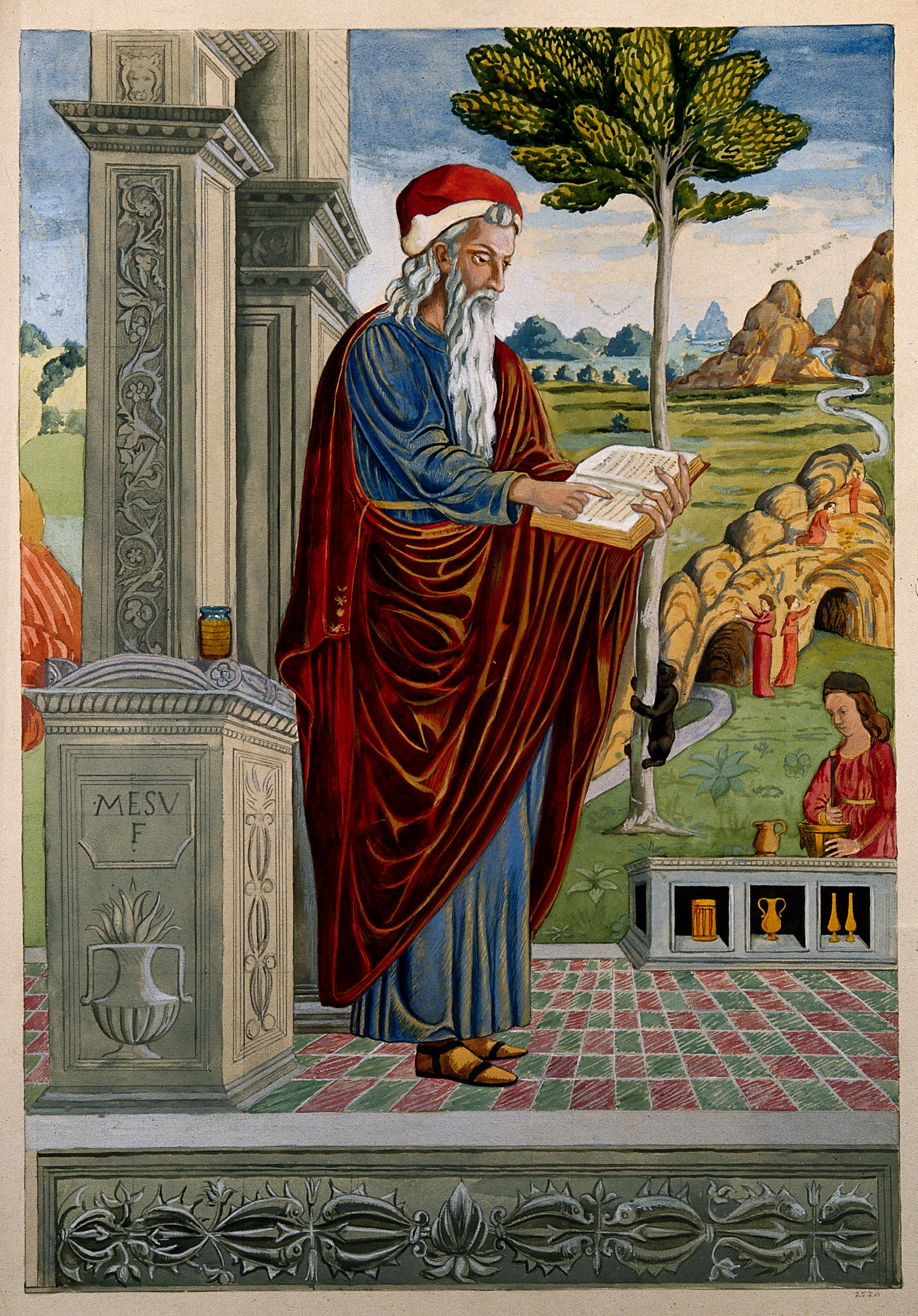
Yuhanna ibn Masawaiyh (ca. 777–857)

Year 857 (DCCCLVII) was a common year starting on Friday of the Julian calendar.

== Events ==
=== By place ===
==== Byzantine Empire ====
- Emperor Michael III, under the influence of his uncle Bardas, banishes his mother Theodora to the Gastria Monastery. Bardas, the de facto regent, becomes the most powerful person in the Byzantine Empire.

==== Europe ====
- November – Erispoe, ruler (duke) of Brittany, is assassinated by his cousin Salomon and followers, in the church at Talensac. King Charles the Bald acknowledges Salomon as the rightful 'king' of Brittany.
- A Danish Viking fleet raids the cities of Dorestad, Paris and Orléans. Others sail up the Oise River, ravaging Beauvais and the abbey of Saint-Germer-de-Fly (approximate date).
- Viking chieftain Rorik, with the agreement of King Lothair II, leaves Dorestad with a fleet and forces his rival Horik II to recognise him as ruler over Denmark (approximate date).

=== By topic ===
==== Medicine ====
- The first recorded major outbreak of ergotism kills thousands of people in the Rhine Valley. They have eaten bread made from rye infected with the ergot fungus parasite Claviceps purpurea (approximate date).

== Births ==
- Ch'oe Ch'i-wŏn, Korean philosopher and poet
- Li Cunjin, general of the Tang dynasty (d. 922)

== Deaths ==
- March 11 – Eulogius, Spanish priest and martyr
- Dae Ijin, king of Balhae (Korea)
- Erispoe, king (duke) of Brittany
- Harith al-Muhasibi, Muslim teacher (b. 781)
- Hilderic of Farfa, Frankish abbot
- Kim Yang, viceroy of Silla (Korea) (b. 808)
- Yuhanna ibn Masawaiyh, Assyrian physician
- Matudán mac Muiredaig, king of Ulaid (Ireland)
- Ma Zhi, chancellor of the Tang dynasty
- Munseong, king of Silla (Korea)
- Roderick, Spanish priest and saint
- Wang Shaoding, Chinese governor (jiedushi)
- Yahya ibn Aktham, Muslim jurist
- Zheng Lang, chancellor of the Tang dynasty
- Ziryab, Muslim poet and musician (b. 789)

== Sources ==
- Treadgold, Warren (1997). A History of the Byzantine State and Society. Stanford, California: Stanford University Press. ISBN 0-8047-2630-2.
