= Kashō =

Period of Japanese history (848–851 CE)

Kashō (嘉祥), also known as Kajō, was a Japanese era name (年号, nengō, "year name") after Jōwa and before Ninju. This period spanned the years from June 848 through April 851. The reigning emperors were Ninmyō-tennō (仁明天皇) and Montoku-tennō (文徳天皇).

== Change of era ==
- February 9, 848 Kashō gannen (嘉祥元年): The new era name Kashō (meaning "good augury") was created because a white tortoise was discovered in the Bungo Province, and it was duly presented to the emperor. The previous era ended and the new one commenced in Jōwa 15, on the 13th day of the 6th month of 848.

== Events of the Kashō era ==
- February 18, 848 (Kashō 1, 10th day of the 1st month): The dainagon Fujiwara no Yoshifusa (904–872) was named udaijin. He was the son of the former sadaijin Fujiwara Fuyutsugu (775–826). Yoshifusa's daughter, Fujiwara no Akira-keiko, became Emperor Montoku's wife and the mother of Emperor Seiwa.
- 848 (Kashō 1, 6th month): A white tortoise was discovered in Bungo Province. As this was an extraordinary thing, all the court officials made their appearances before the emperor with comments about the good augury this tortoise represented.
- 849 (Kashō 2, 4th month): An ambassador from Baekje was received at court.
- 849 (Kashō 2, 5th month): The ambassador from Baekje was received by the emperor, who entertained him. Emperor Tenmyō charged Ono no Takamura to prepare a letter which was to be presented at the Baekje court.
- 849 (Kashō 2, 10th month): Nimmyo celebrated his 40th birthday, and many presents were offered to him.
- 849 (Kashō 2, 11th month): The emperor toured the capital in a grand procession; and when he passed by the prison, he ordered Yoshifusa to give freedom to all the prisoners held there. Ninmyo caused rice and monies to be distributed amongst the poor.
- 850 (Kashō 3, 1st month): The emperor made an official visit (chōkin) to the residence of his mother as a way of demonstrating filial piety.
- May 6, 850 (Kashō 3, 21st day of the 3rd month): Emperor Ninmyō died at age 41; and his eldest son received the succession (senso). Shortly thereafter, Emperor Montoku formally acceded to the throne (sokui). According to his wishes, he was entombed without pomp or ceremony. After this, the emperor was sometimes referred to as "the Emperor of Fukakasa", which was the name given to his mausoleum. Emperor Ninmyo had reigned 17 years—14 years in the Jōwa era, and 3 years in the Kashō era.
- 850 (Kashō 3, 5th month): Tachibana no Kachiko died. She was the widow of Emperor Saga and the mother of Emperor Ninmyō and the grandmother of Emperor Montoku. This very devout Buddhist had founded a temple called Danrin-ji (檀林寺) on the site of present-day Tenryū-ji (天龍寺)—more formally known as Tenryū Shiseizen-ji (天龍資聖禅寺), located in what is now Susukinobaba-chō, Ukyō Ward in Kyoto, Before her death, the former empress had been known by the honorific name and title, Danrin-kōgō (檀林皇后); and she had been honored as if she were a saint.

== Notes ==
Preceded by Jōwa	Era or nengō Kashō; 848–851	Succeeded by Ninju
