= Yingtian =

Yingtian may refer to:

- Empress Dowager Yingtian, Empress Dowager in Liao Dynasty
- Yingtian (Song Dynasty) (應天府), ancient name of Shangqiu, Henan during the Song Dynasty
- Yingtian (Ming Dynasty) (應天府), ancient name of Nanjing during the Ming Dynasty
- Yingtian, Miluo (营田镇), a town in Miluo City, Hunan Province.
- Yingtian Gate (應天門)，ancient city gate of Luoyang, China.

== Historical eras ==
- Yingtian (759), era name used by Shi Siming
- Yingtian (783–784), era name used by Zhu Ci
- Yingtian (911–913), era name used by Liu Shouguang
- Yingtian (1206–1209), era name used by Emperor Xiangzong of Western Xia
