= Ninju =

Period of Japanese history (851–854 CE)

Ninju (仁寿) was a Japanese era name (年号, nengō, "year name") after Kashō and before Saikō. This period spanned the years from April 851 through November 854. The reigning emperor was Montoku-tennō (文徳天皇).

== Change of era ==
- February 5, 851 Ninju gannen (仁寿元年): The new era name was created to mark an event or series of events. The previous era ended and the new one commenced in Kashō 4, on the 28th day of the 4th month of 851.

== Events of the Ninju era ==
- 853 (Ninju 3, 2nd month): The emperor visited the home of udaijin Fujiwara no Yoshifusa, the grandfather of his designated heir.
- 853 (Ninju 3, 5th month): Asama Shrine in Suruga Province is styled myōjin, and the shrine is accorded national ranking in the lists of shrines and temples.

== Notes ==
Preceded by Kashō	Era or nengō Ninju; 851–854	Succeeded by Saikō
