= Tennō-no-Mori Kofun =

Kofun period keyhole-shaped burial mound in Japan

- 天皇の杜古墳 (Japanese)
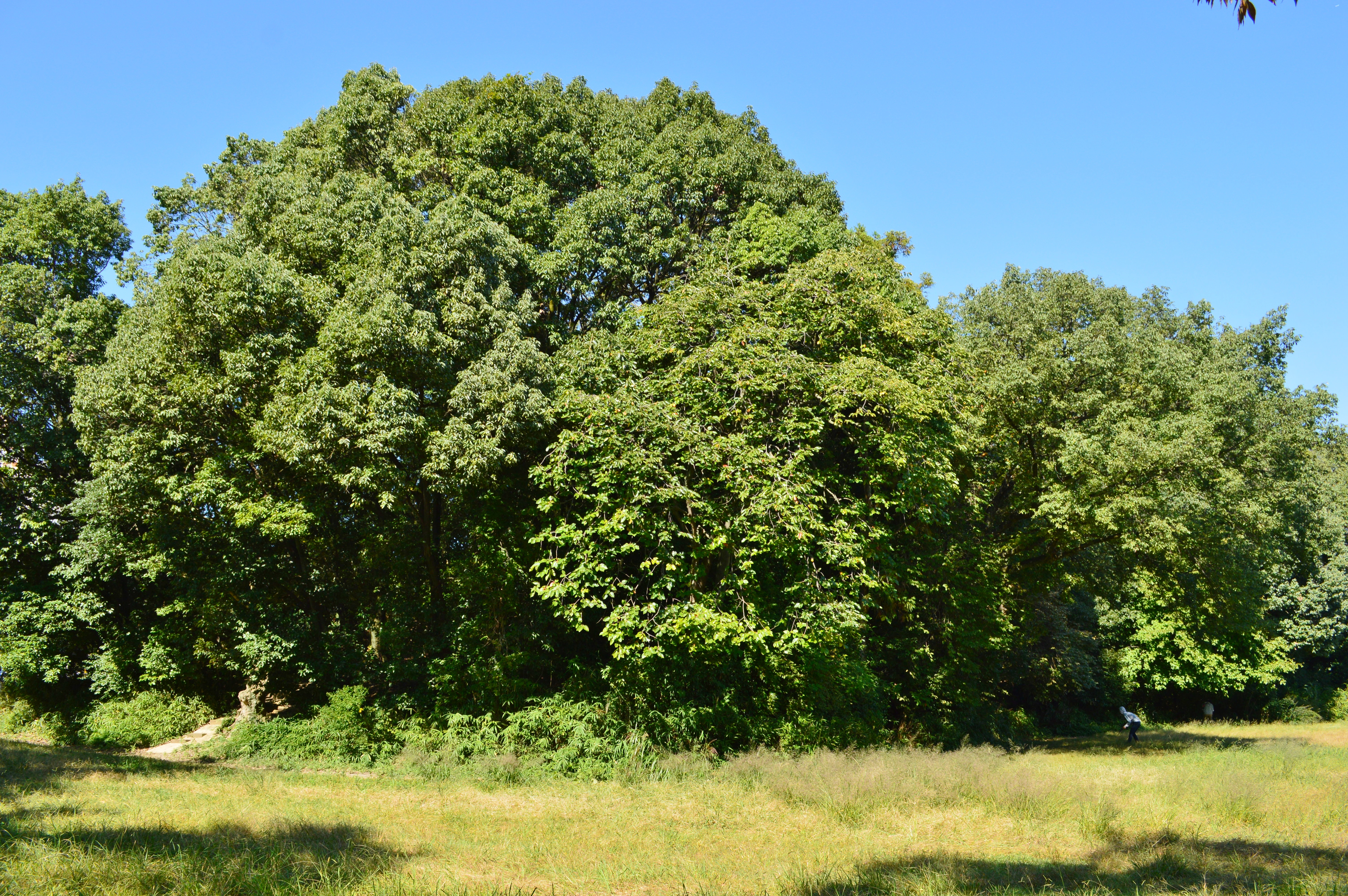
- Tennō-no-Mori Kofun

- Tennō-no-Mori Kofun Tennō-no-Mori Kofun (Japan)
- 34°58′39.04″N 135°41′22.74″E
- Type: Kofun
- Periods: Kofun period
- Location: Nishikyō-ku, Kyoto, Japan
- Region: Kansai region

History
- Built: c.4th century

Site notes
- Public access: Yes (park)
- National Historic Site of Japan 京都府内の位置

Tennō-no-Mori Kofun (天皇の杜古墳) is a Kofun period keyhole-shaped burial mound, located in the Goryōzuka-no-koshi-chō, neighborhood of Nishikyō-ku, Kyoto in the Kansai region of Japan. The tumulus was designated a National Historic Site of Japan in 1922, and was incorporated into the Otokuni Kofun Cluster in 2016.

== Overview ==
The Tennō-no-Mori Kofun was built at the foot of a hill on the right bank of the Katsura River, on the western edge of the Kyoto Basin. Per local folklore, it was widely believed to have been the tomb of the Heian period Emperor Montoku, who reigned from 850 to 858, and the name "Tennō-no-Mori" and the surrounding place name "Goryō" reflect this. The tumulus is well preserved, and it was surveyed from 1981 to 1982, with archaeological excavations carried out in 1988–1989.

The shape of the tomb is a zenpō-kōen-fun (前方後円墳), which is shaped like a keyhole, having one square end and one circular end, when viewed from above. The anterior portion does not widen out, as is typical with most zenpō-kōen-fun, and has been likened to the shape of a handle on a mirror. The tumulus is orientated to the south-southeast. The tumulus is built in two tiers, and has fukiishi roofing stones and rows of haniwa (both cylindrical and morning glory-shaped) have been found on the outside of the mound. There is no trace of a moat around the tumulus. The details of the burial chamber are unclear as the interior of the tumulus has yet to be excavated. From its style, the construction date of this tumulus is estimated to be around the end of the 4th century, or early in the middle of the Kofun period.

The tumulus is currently maintained and open to the public as a historic park. The tumulus is about a 20-minute walk from Katsura Station on the Hankyu Railway Kyoto Main Line.

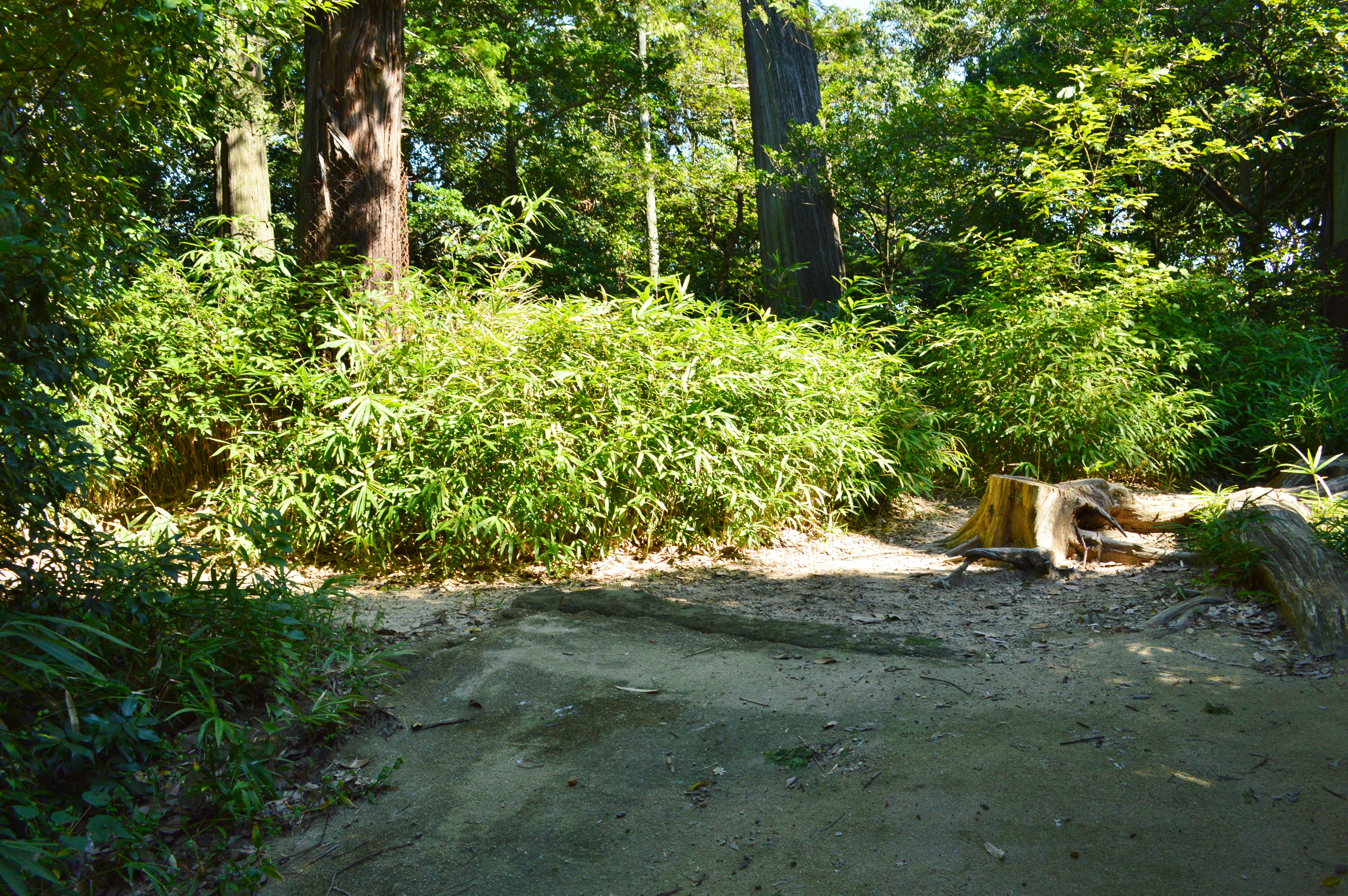
Top of the mound

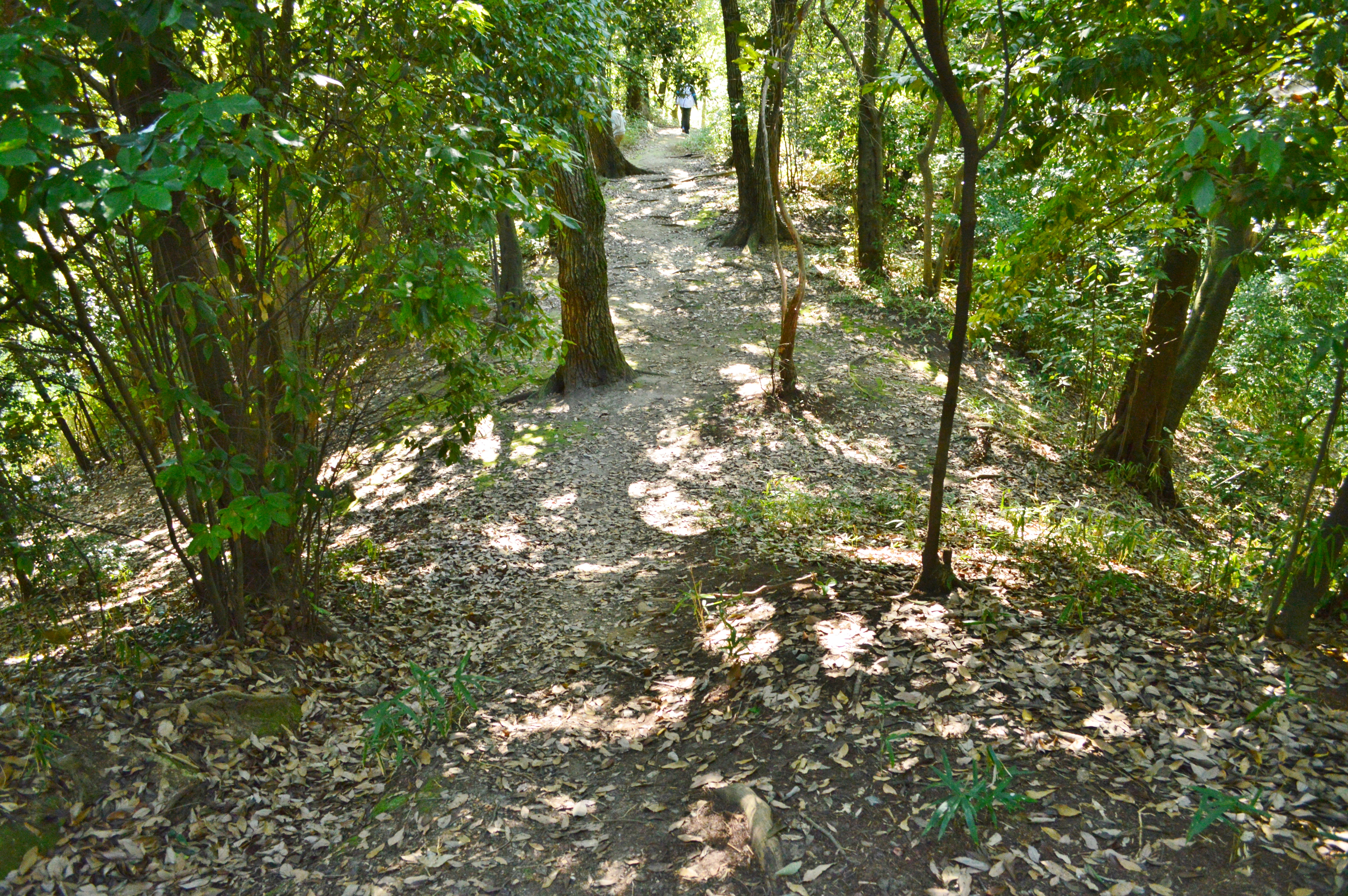
View of the anterior portion from the posterior circular mound

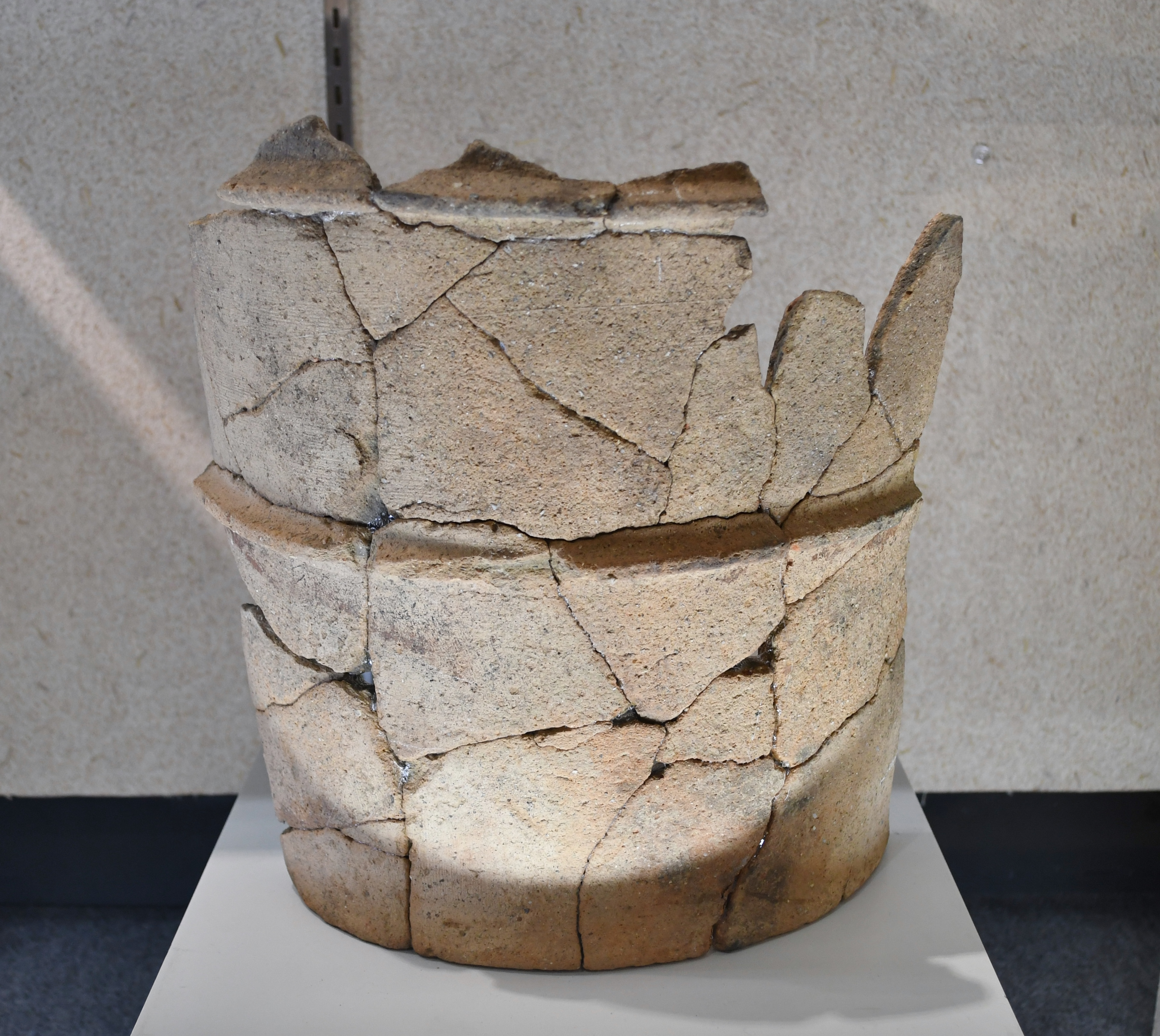
Cylindrical haniwa
Photographed during a special exhibition at Kyoto City Archaeological Museum

Total length
83.0 meters:
Anterior rectangular portion
33.5 meters wide x 4.8 meters high, 2-tier
Posterior circular portion
50.5 meter diameter x 7.2 meters high, 2-tiers

== See also ==
- List of Historic Sites of Japan (Kyoto)
