= 789 =

Calendar year

789 in various calendars
Gregorian calendar	789; DCCLXXXIX
Ab urbe condita	1542
Armenian calendar	238; ԹՎ ՄԼԸ
Assyrian calendar	5539
Balinese saka calendar	710–711
Bengali calendar	195–196
Berber calendar	1739
Buddhist calendar	1333
Burmese calendar	151
Byzantine calendar	6297–6298
Chinese calendar	戊辰年 (Earth Dragon); 3486 or 3279 — to — 己巳年 (Earth Snake); 3487 or 3280
Coptic calendar	505–506
Discordian calendar	1955
Ethiopian calendar	781–782
Hebrew calendar	4549–4550
- Hindu calendars
Vikram Samvat	845–846
Shaka Samvat	710–711
Kali Yuga	3889–3890
Holocene calendar	10789
Iranian calendar	167–168
Islamic calendar	172–173
Japanese calendar	Enryaku 8 (延暦８年)
Javanese calendar	684–685
Julian calendar	789; DCCLXXXIX
Korean calendar	3122
Minguo calendar	1123 before ROC 民前1123年
Nanakshahi calendar	−679
Seleucid era	1100/1101 AG
Thai solar calendar	1331–1332
Tibetan calendar	ས་ཕོ་འབྲུག་ལོ་ (male Earth-Dragon); 915 or 534 or −238 — to — ས་མོ་སྦྲུལ་ལོ་ (female Earth-Snake); 916 or 535 or −237

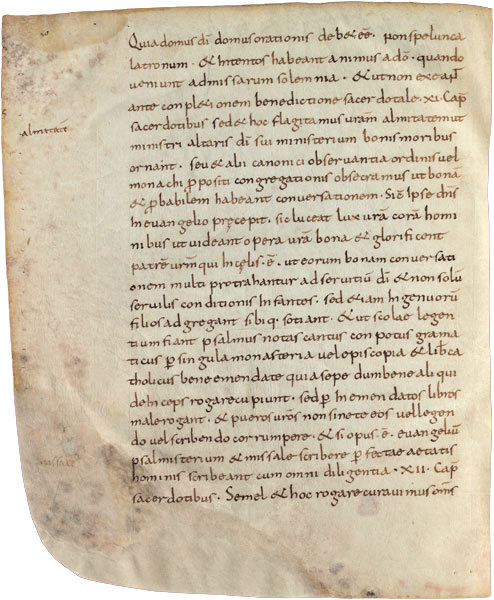
Text of the Admonitio generalis (789)

Year 789 (DCCLXXXIX) was a common year starting on Thursday of the Julian calendar. The denomination 789 for this year has been used since the early medieval period, when the Anno Domini calendar era became the prevalent method in Europe for naming years.

== Events ==
=== By place ===
==== Europe ====
- King Charlemagne crosses the Elbe River with a Frankish-Saxon army into Obotrite territory. He subdues the Wiltzes, and reaches the Baltic.
- King Pepin of Italy conquers Istria on the Adriatic, ignoring Byzantine protests. He establishes a tributary march, and sends missionaries.
- Charlemagne issues the Admonitio generalis, which covers educational and ecclesiastical reforms within the Frankish Kingdom.
- Charlemagne founds the town of Herford (modern Germany), in order to guard a ford crossing the narrow Werre River.

==== Britain ====
- King Beorhtric of Wessex marries Princess Eadburh, daughter of King Offa of Mercia, and accepts Mercian overlordship.
- Constantine I is installed as king of the Picts. He becomes one of the greatest Scottish monarchs in the Viking period.
- The Anglo-Saxon Chronicle records the first appearance of Vikings in England. The Viking raid on Portland in Dorset is the first of its kind recorded in the British Isles, including Ireland. The reeve of Dorchester (a local high-ranking official) goes to greet them after they land, perhaps accustomed to welcoming Scandinavian merchants. He is killed. Viking attacks increase in intensity over the coming decades.

==== Islamic Caliphate ====
- Al-Khayzuran, widow of former Abbasid caliph Al-Mahdi, dies, leaving more of the effective and real power in the hands of Harun al-Rashid.
- Idris I reaches Volubilis and founds the Idrisid dynasty, ceding Morocco from the Abbasid caliphate and founding the first Moroccan state.

==== Asia ====
- An uprising in Japan leads to a major defeat for Emperor Kanmu, along with a severe drought and famine; the streets of the capital Nagaoka-kyō are clogged with the sick.

== Births ==
- Lu Shang, chancellor of the Tang Dynasty (d. 859)
- Ziryab, Muslim poet and musician (d. 857)

== Deaths ==
- February 20 – Leo of Catania, saint and bishop of Catania (b. 709)
- November 8 – Willehad, bishop of Bremen
- Al-Khayzuran, powerful wife and adviser of Abbasid caliph Al-Mahdi and the excellent mother of Al-Hadi and Harun Al-Rashid, the Abbasid caliphs, de facto co-ruler of the Abbasid Caliphate
- Fiachnae mac Áedo Róin, king of Ulaid (Ireland)
- Amat al-Aziz Ghadir, was the mother of Abbasid prince; Ali ibn Harun al-Rashid.
- Hildeprand, duke of Spoleto
- Mauregatus, king of Asturias (or 788)
- Muhammad ibn Sulayman ibn Ali, Abbasid prince and provincial governor
- Torson, Frankish count of Toulouse (or 790)
