= Great Fire of Angen =

1177 fire in Heian-kyō

- Native name: 安元の大火
- Date: 1177
- Time: Beginning of the hour of the wild boar (10:00pm) (Traditional Japanese time)
- Location: Heian palace, Heian-kyō; Near 35°0′49″N 135°44′32″E
- Outcome: Destruction of a third of the capital, including the Great Imperial Audience Hall, courtier mansions, and the front gate of the palace.

The Great Fire of Angen was a fire that swept through Heian-kyō (now Kyoto) in 1177, destroying around a third of the then capital city. It was recorded by Fujiwara no Kanezane.

== Outbreak ==
The fire broke out at the beginning of the hour of the wild boar (which is about 10:00pm). At the beginning of the hour of the dog (about 8:00pm), Fujiwara no Kanezane finished a ritual of mourning, recording that a "princess also ended her mourning in this evening." (The text does not specify which princess).

He noted the clear weather and wrote "Around 8 p.m. I performed the ritual to end the mourning on the riverbed. The princess also ended her mourning in this evening. Chamberlain to the princess [Kanezane's son Yoshimichi] ended the mourning in front of her residence." He continued to write, finally noting the fire by saying, "Around 10 p.m., a fire broke out in the northern direction. I heard that the fire started at Higuchi-Tominokoji." At the time, Kanezane was ill and remained at home. Due to this, he had to have a servant assess the situation.

As the fire worsened, the Emperor and Empress were moved to Fujiwara no Kunitsuna's home.

As the fire swept through Heian-kyō, it reached the palace where it burnt the enthronement hall. The great hall was never rebuilt and no Muromachi period emperors were enthroned in Heian-kyō.

== Damage ==
The damaged buildings were:

=== The Imperial Court ===
- Daigokuden
- Department of Divinities
- Shingon-in Temple
- Chodoin
- Ministry of Popular Affairs
- Ministry of Water Affairs
- Kikyo-mon Gate
- Accounting Dormitory
- Office of food preparation for the imperial family
- Yingtian Gate (There is both one in China, and one in Heian-kyō, modern day Kyoto)
- Tax-collection office
- Suzakumon
- Shikibu-shō

=== Other facilities ===
- Daigaku-ryō
- Kan'gakuin

=== Residence's of the nobility and princes ===
- Residence of Matsudono Motofusa
- Residence of Taira no Shigemori
- Residence of Tokudaiji Sanesada
- Residence of Shigenoi Sanekuni
- Residence of Fujiwara no Takaki
- Residence of Fujiwara no Kunitsuna
- Residence of Sanjo Sanefusa
- Residence of Minamoto no Sadafusa
- Residence of Fujiwara no Sukenaga
- Residence of Nakayama Tadachika
- Residence of Fujiwara no Sanetsuna
- Residence of Fujiwara no Yoritada
- Residence of Fujiwara no Toshitsune
- Residence of Fujiwara no Toshimori

Fujiwara no Kanezane noted all of these, while noting the constellations, believing that they were a bad omen.
