= Saiin (priestess) =

Saiin or Itsuki no In (斎院) were female relatives of the Japanese emperor (termed saiō) who served as High Priestesses in Kamo shrines. Saiin princesses were usually elected from royalty (内親王, naishinnō) or princess (女王, joō). In principle, Saiin remained unmarried, but there were exceptions. Some Saiin became consorts of the Emperor, called Nyōgo in Japanese. The Saiin order of priestesses existed throughout the Heian and Kamakura periods.

Saiin is also the name given to the palace where the Saiin Priestesses lived and served the Shinto deities.

== Saiin in Literature ==
In The Tale of Genji, a famous work of Japanese literature, there is a story about a man named Hikaru Genji who yearned for a Saiin Princess named Asagao, but Asagao maintained a platonic relationship with Genji.

The 11th century story Sagoromo Monogatari tells the story of an unrequited love between the protagonist and Genji no Miya, who later becomes the Kamo Saiin.

== Historical Saiin ==
=== Princess Shikishi (式子内親王) ===
Princess Shikishi (Shikishi Naishinnō), 3rd daughter of Emperor Go-Shirikawa and Fujiwara no Seishi, was appointed High Priestess of Kamo shrine in 1159, at the age of six. She resigned her position in 1169 due to illness. After her resignation Shikishi went on to become an accomplished poet. 399 of her poems remain in existence today.

== List of Saiin ==
1. 810–831 Princess Uchiko (有智子内親王) (807–847), daughter of Emperor Saga
2. 831–833 Princess Tokiko (時子内親王) (?–847), daughter of Emperor Ninmyō
3. 833–850 Princess Takaiko (高子内親王) (?–866), daughter of Emperor Ninmyō
4. 850–857 Princess Akirakeiko (慧子内親王) (?–881), daughter of Emperor Montoku
5. 857–858 Princess Jutsushi (述子内親王) (?–897), daughter of Emperor Montoku
6. 859–876 Princess Gishi (儀子内親王) (?–879), daughter of Emperor Montoku
7. 877–880 Princess Atsuko (敦子内親王) (?–930), daughter of Emperor Seiwa
8. 882–887 Princess Bokushi (穆子内親王) (?–903), daughter of Emperor Kōkō
9. 889–892 Princess Naoiko (直子女王) (?–892), daughter of Prince Korehiko
10. 893–902 Princess Kimiko (君子内親王) (?–902), daughter of Emperor Uda
11. 903–915 Princess Kyōshi (恭子内親王) (902–915), daughter of Emperor Daigo
12. 915–920 Princess Nobuko (宣子内親王) (902–920), daughter of Emperor Daigo
13. 921–930 Princess Shōshi (韶子内親王) (918–980), daughter of Emperor Daigo
14. 931–967 Princess Enshi (婉子内親王) (904–969), daughter of Emperor Daigo
15. 968–975 Princess Sonshi (尊子内親王) (966–985), daughter of Emperor Reizei
16. 975–1031 Princess Senshi (選子内親王) (964–1035), daughter of Emperor Murakami
17. 1031–1036 Princess Kaoruko (馨子内親王) (1029–1093), daughter of Emperor Go-Ichijō
18. 1036–1045 Princess Kenshi (娟子内親王) (1032–1103), daughter of Emperor Go-Suzaku
19. 1046–1058 Princess Baishi (禖子内親王) (1039–1096), daughter of Emperor Go-Suzaku
20. 1058–1069 Princess Shōshi (正子内親王) (1045–1114), daughter of Emperor Go-Suzaku
21. 1069–1072 Princess Yoshiko (佳子内親王) (1057–1130), daughter of Emperor Go-Sanjō
22. 1073 Princess Atsuko (篤子内親王) (1060–1114), daughter of Emperor Go-Sanjō
23. 1074–1089 Princess Seishi (斉子内親王), daughter of Ko-Ichijo In (Prince Atsuakira)
24. 1089–1099 Princess Reishi (令子内親王) (1078–1144), daughter of Emperor Shirakawa
25. 1099–1107 Princess Shinshi (禛子内親王) (1081–1156), daughter of Emperor Shirakawa
26. 1108–1123 Princess Kanshi (官子内親王) (1090-?), daughter of Emperor Shirakawa
27. 1123–1126 Princess Sōshi (悰子内親王) (1099–1162), daughter of Emperor Horikawa
28. 1127–1132 Princess Muneko (統子内親王) (1126–1189), daughter of Emperor Toba
29. 1132–1133 Princess Yoshiko (禧子内親王) (1122–1133), daughter of Emperor Toba
30. 1133–1159 Princess Ishi (怡子女王), daughter of Prince Sukehito
31. 1159–1169 Princess Shikishi (式子内親王) (1149–1201), daughter of Emperor Go-Shirakawa
32. 1169–1171 Princess Zenshi (僐子内親王) (1159–1171), daughter of Emperor Nijō
33. 1171 Princess Shōshi (頌子内親王) (1145–1208), daughter of Emperor Toba
34. 1178–1181 Princess Noriko (範子内親王) (1177–1210), daughter of Emperor Takakura
35. 1204–1212 Princess Reishi (礼子内親王) (1200–1272), daughter of Emperor Go-Toba.

== See also ==
- Kamo shrines
- Ise Grand Shrine
- Saikū
