= Emperor Montoku =

Emperor of Japan from 850 to 858

Emperor Montoku 文徳天皇
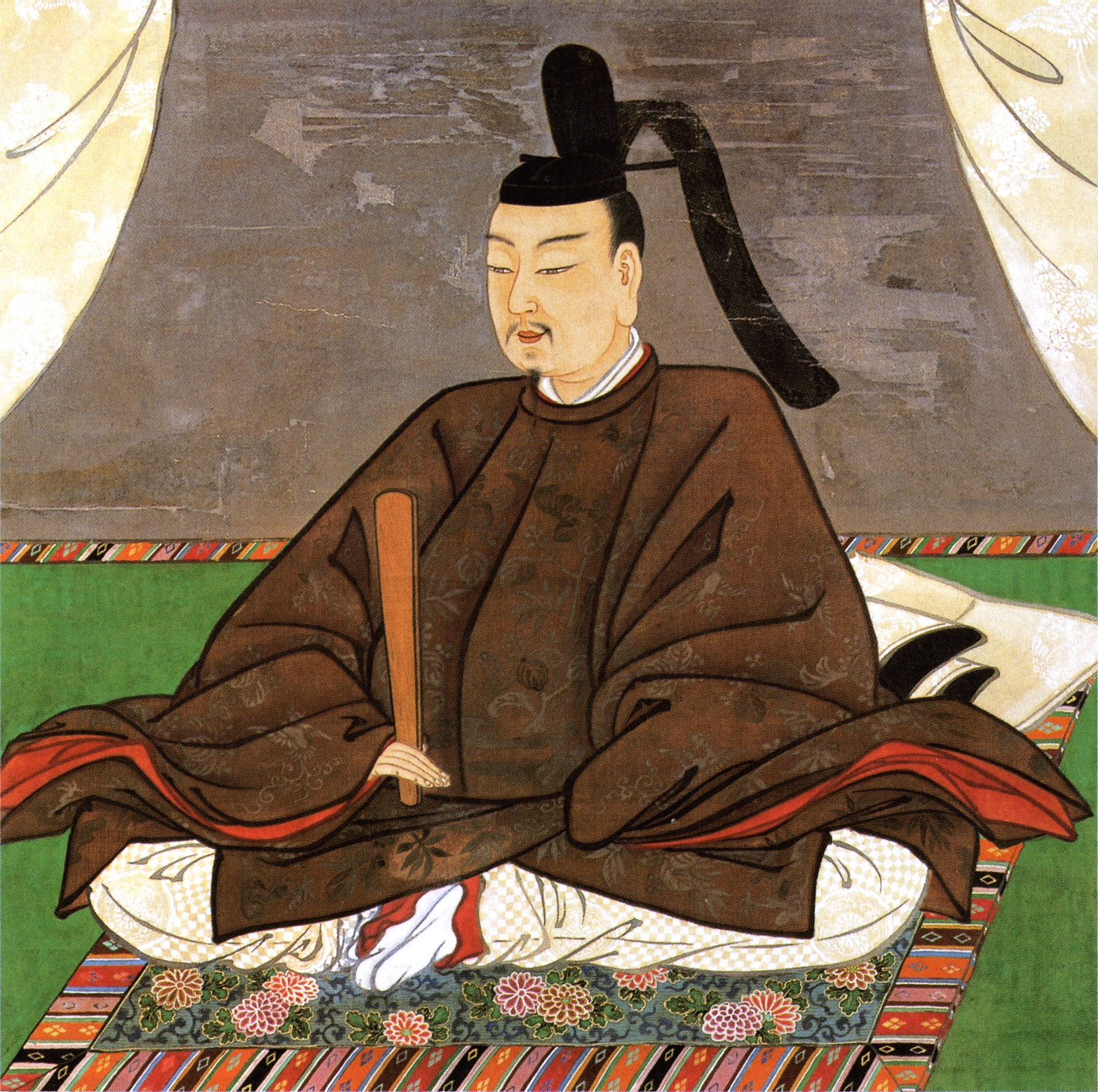

Emperor of Japan
- Reign: 4 May 850 – 7 October 858
- Enthronement: 31 May 850
- Predecessor: Ninmyō
- Successor: Seiwa
- Born: August 827; Heian Kyō (Kyōto)
- Died: 7 October 858 (aged 31); Heian Kyō (Kyōto)
- Burial: Tamura no misasagi (田邑陵) (Kyoto)
- Issue more...: Emperor Seiwa
Posthumous name
- Chinese-style shigō: Emperor Montoku (文徳天皇)
- House: Imperial House of Japan
- Father: Ninmyō
- Mother: Fujiwara no Junshi

Emperor Montoku (文徳天皇, Montoku-tennō) (August 827 – 7 October 858) was the 55th emperor of Japan, according to the traditional order of succession.

Montoku's reign lasted from 850 to 858. Before Montoku's ascension to the Chrysanthemum Throne, his personal name (imina) was Michiyasu (道康). He was also known as Tamura-no-mikado or Tamura-tei. Montoku had six Imperial consorts and 29 Imperial children.

== Biography ==
Emperor Montoku was the eldest son of Emperor Ninmyō. His mother was Empress Dowager Fujiwara no Junshi (also called the Gojō empress 五条后), daughter of the minister of the left, Fujiwara no Fuyutsugu.In 842, during the Jōwa Incident, when Crown Prince Tsunesada was deposed, Fujiwara no Yoshifusa, supported him as Crown Prince and he ascended to the throne in 850, following Emperor Ninmyō's abdication. This sequence of events, among others, contributed to the increasing control of the Fujiwara over every aspect of the government. While Montoku was still Crown Prince, Yoshifusa's daughter, Akira Keiko, entered the imperial court, and in March of the year of the Emperor's enthronement, she gave birth to his fourth son (Prince Korehito, later Emperor Seiwa). In November, at eight months old, Prince Korehito was appointed Crown Prince, supplanting the eldest son, Prince Korechika, who had been born to the official consort Ki no Shizuko. Yoshifusa's pressure forced Ninmyō to appoint Korehito as Crown Prince. However, the power struggle between the Emperor and Yoshifusa continued, and under Yoshifusa's pressure, Emperor Ninmyō resided in places such as the Togu Gain in the eastern part of the Imperial Palace and the Reizen-in, which had been the post-retirement residence of Emperor Saga, never once living in the main palace building. Furthermore, the Emperor himself was in poor health and rarely attended court meetings or ceremonies. The Emperor also once attempted to abdicate in favor of Prince Korehito on the condition that Prince Korechika be appointed Crown Prince, but this was abandoned due to the admonition of the Minister of the Left, Minamoto no Makoto, who feared that Prince Korechika's life would be in danger.

Under these circumstances, Emperor Montoku died suddenly of illness in August 858. He was 32 years old. The prevailing theory is that the cause of death was a stroke; however, the possibility that he had been assassinated cannot be ruled out.

During Montoku's reign, the compilation of the Shoku Nihon Koki began. There is a 10-volume Nihon Montoku Tenno Jitsuroku (Chronicles of Emperor Montoku of Japan), compiled by Fujiwara no Yoshifusa, Haruzumi Yoshinawa, and others, which records the history of the Emperor's reign in chronological order. In 851, the Seiryōden, where Emperor Ninmyō died, was dismantled and relocated to the side of his mausoleum in Fukakusa, becoming the Kasho-do.

== Grave of Emperor Montoku ==
The site of Montoku's grave is designated by the Imperial Household Agency in what is now Ukyo-ku, Kyoto It is formally named Tamura no misasagi. According to the Nihon Montoku Tenno Jitsuroku, the site was on Mount Maharayama, and that 40 monks from nearby Kōryū-ji were assigned to chant sutras for 49 days after the funeral; however, the exact location was lost soon afterwards. During the Muromachi period and into the Edo Period, the Tennō-no-Mori Kofun, a 4th century zenpō-kōen-fun located in Nishikyō-ku, Kyoto was widely believed to be the tomb of Emperor Montoku; the present site was only so designated during the Bunkyu Restoration Project in 1862-1863. The tomb is a circular mound facing almost south, flanked by ponds to the east and west.

== Events of Montoku's life ==
- 6 May 850 (Kashō 3, 21st day of the 3rd month): In the 17th year of Ninmyō-tennō's reign (仁明天皇十七年), the emperor died; and his eldest son received the succession (senso).
- 850 (Kashō 3, 4th month): Emperor Montoku formally acceded to the throne (sokui).
- 850 (Kashō 3, 5th month): The widow of Emperor Saga, who was also the mother of Emperor Ninmyō and the grandmother of Emperor Montoku, died. This very devout Buddhist had founded a temple called Danrin-ji (檀林寺) on the site of present-day Tenryū-ji (天龍寺) – more formally known as Tenryū Shiseizen-ji (天龍資聖禅寺), located in what is now Susukinobaba-chō, Ukyō Ward in Kyoto, Before her death, the former empress had been known by the honorific title, Danrin-kōgō (檀林皇后); and she had been honored as if she were a saint.
- 850 (Kashō 3, 11th month): The emperor named Korehito-shinnō, the 4th son of Emperor Montoku as his heir. This 9-month-old baby was also the grandson of udaijin Fujiwara no Yoshifusa.
- 853 (Ninju 3, 2nd month): The emperor visited the home of udaijin Yoshifusa, the grandfather of his designated heir.
- 11 July 854 (Saikō 1, 13th day of the 6th month): The sadaijin Minamoto no Tokiwa, also known as Minamoto no Tsune, died at age 43.
- 855 (Saikō 2, in the 1st month): The Emishi organized a rebellion; and in response, a force of 1,000 men and provisions were sent to the north.
- 855 (Saikō 2, 5th month): The head of the great statue of Buddha in the Tōdai-ji fell off; and in consequence, the emperor ordered the then dainagon Fujiwara no Yoshisuke, the brother of sadaijin Yoshifusa, to be in charge of gathering the gifts of the pious from throughout the empire to make another head for the Daibutsu.

Events during his reign included the repression of insurrections among the Ebisu people in Mutsu Province in 855, and among the people of the island of Tsushima two years later.

- 7 October 858 (Ten'an 2, 27th day of the 8th month): Montoku died at the age of 32.

=== Kugyō ===
Kugyō (公卿) is a collective term for the very few most powerful men attached to the court of the Emperor of Japan in pre-Meiji eras.– kugyō of Montoku-tennō (in French)

In general, this elite group included only three to four men at a time. These were hereditary courtiers whose experience and background would have brought them to the pinnacle of a life's career. During Montoku's reign, this apex of the Daijō-kan included:

- Daijō-daijin, Fujiwara no Yoshifusa (藤原良房), 804–872.
- Sadaijin, Minamoto no Tokiwa (源常), 812–854.
- Sadaijin, Minamoto no Makoto (源信), 810–868.
- Udaijin, Fujiwara no Yoshifusa (藤原良房), 804–872.
- Udaijin, Fujiwara no Yoshimi (藤原良相), 813–867.
- Naidaijin (not appointed)
- Dainagon

== Eras of Montoku's reign ==
The years of Montoku's reign are more specifically identified by more than one era name or nengō.

- Kashō (848–851)
- Ninju (851–854)
- Saikō (854–857)
- Ten'an (857–859)

== Consorts and children ==
- Consort (Nyōgo) (Tai-Kotaigō): Fujiwara no Akirakeiko (藤原明子; 829–899), also known as Somedono-no-Kisaki, Fujiwara no Yoshifusa's daughter.
  - Fourth Son: Imperial Prince Korehito (惟仁親王) later Emperor Seiwa
  - Third Daughter: Imperial Princess Gishi (儀子内親王; d. 879), 6th Saiin in Kamo Shrine 859–876
- Consort (Nyōgo): Fujiwara no Koshi/Furuko (藤原古子), Fujiwara no Fuyutsugu's daughter
- Consort (Nyōgo): Fujiwara no Takakiko (藤原多賀幾子; d. 858), Fujiwara no Yoshimi's daughter
- Consort (Nyōgo): Princess Azumako (東子女王; d. 865)
- Consort (Nyōgo): Fujiwara no Nenshi/Toshiko (藤原年子)
- Consort (Nyōgo): Fujiwara no Koreko (藤原是子)
- Consort (Nyōgo): Tachibana no Fusako (橘房子), Tachibana no Ujikimi's daughter
- Consort (Nyōgo): Tachibana no Chushi (橘忠子), Tachibana no Ujikimi's daughter
- Consort (Koui): Ki no Shizuko (紀静子; d. 866), Ki no Natora's daughter
  - First Son: Imperial Prince Koretaka (惟喬親王; 844–897)
  - Second son: Imperial Prince Koreeda (惟条親王; 848–868)
  - Imperial Princess Tenshi (恬子内親王; d. 913), 20th Saiō in Ise Shrine 859–876
  - Fifth daughter: Imperial Princess Jutsushi (述子内親王; d. 897), 5th Saiin in Kamo Shrine 857–858
  - Imperial Princess Chinshi (珍子内親王; d. 877)
- Court lady: Shigeno no Okuko (滋野奥子), Shigeno no Sadanushi's daughter
  - Third Son: Imperial Prince Korehiko (惟彦親王; 850–883)
  - Imperial Princess Nōshi (濃子内親王; d. 903)
  - Imperial Princess Shōshi (勝子内親王; d. 871)
- Court lady: Fujiwara no Konshi/Imako (藤原今子), Fujiwara no Sadamori's daughter
  - Imperial Prince Koretsune (惟恒親王; d. 904)
  - Imperial Princess Reishi (礼子内親王; d. 899)
  - Seventh Daughter: Imperial Princess Keishi (掲子内親王; d. 914), 22nd Saiō in Ise Shrine 882–884
- Court lady: Fujiwara no Retsushi (藤原列子), Fujiwara no Koreo's daughter
  - First Daughter: Imperial Princess Anshi (晏子内親王; d. 900), 19th Saiō in Ise Shrine 850–858
  - Eighth Daughter: Imperial Princess Akirakeiko (慧子内親王; d. 881), 4th Saiin in Kamo Shrine 850–857
- Court lady: Shigeno no Mineko (滋野岑子), Shigeno no Sadao's daughter
  - Minamoto no Motoari (源本有)
  - Minamoto no Noriari (源載有)
  - Minamoto no Fuchiko/Shigeko (源淵子/滋子; d. 911)
- Court lady: Tomo clan's daughter
  - Minamoto no Yoshiari (源能有; 845–897), Udaijin 896–897
- Court lady: Fuse clan's daughter
  - Minamoto no Yukiari (源行有; 854–887)
- Court lady: Tajihi clan's daughter
  - Minamoto no Tsuneari (源毎有)
- Court lady: Kiyohara clan's daughter
  - Minamoto no Tokiari (源時有)
- Court lady: Sugawara clan's daughter
  - Minamoto no Sadaari (源定有)
  - Minamoto no Tomiko (源富子)
- (from unknown women)
  - Minamoto no Tomiari (源富有, d.887)
  - Minamoto no Hyōshi (源憑子)
  - Minamoto no Kenshi (源謙子)
  - Minamoto no Okuko (源奥子)
  - Minamoto no Retsushi (源列子)
  - Minamoto no Seishi (源済子), married to Emperor Seiwa
  - Minamoto no Shuko (源修子)

== Ancestry ==
Ancestors of Emperor Montoku

8. Emperor Kanmu (737–806)
4. Emperor Saga (786–842)
9. Fujiwara no Otomuro (760–790)
2. Emperor Ninmyō (808-850)
10. Tachibana no Kiyotomo (758–789)
5. Tachibana no Kachiko (786–850)
11. Taguchi Michihime
1. Emperor Montoku
12. Fujiwara no Uchimaro (756–812)
6. Fujiwara no Fuyutsugu (775–826)
13. Kudara no Nagatsugu
3. Fujiwara no Junshi (809–871)
14.Fujiwara no Matsukuri
7. Fujiwara no Mitsuko (781–828)

== See also ==
- Emperor of Japan
- List of Emperors of Japan
- Imperial cult
- Nihon Montoku Tennō Jitsuroku, one of the Six National Histories

== Notes ==
Japanese Imperial kamon — a stylized chrysanthemum blossom

Regnal titles
Preceded by Emperor Ninmyō	Emperor of Japan: Montoku; 850–858	Succeeded by Emperor Seiwa
