= Tenchō =

Period of Japanese history (824–834 CE)

Tenchō (天長) was a Japanese era name (年号, nengō; lit. "year name") after Kōnin and before Jōwa. This period spanned the years from January 824 through January 834. The reigning emperors were Junna-tennō (淳和天皇) and Ninmyō-tennō (仁明天皇).

== Change of era ==
- February 6, 824 Tenchō gannen (天長元年): The new era name was created to mark an event or series of events. The previous era ended and the new one commenced in Kōnin 15, on the 5th day of the 1st month of 824.

== Events of the Tenchō era ==
- 824 (Tenchō 1): This summer was entirely dry; and prayers for rain were offered by the Buddhist priest Kūkai, who is also known by the posthumous name, Kōbō-Daishi. Those prayers seemed to be answered when it did begin to rain sometime later.
- 824 (Tenchō 1, 7th month): The former-Emperor Heizei died at age 51.
- 825 (Tenchō 2, 11th month): The former-Emperor Saga celebrated his 40th birthday.
- 826 (Tenchō 3, 11th month): Kōbō-Daishi counsels the emperor to build a pagoda near To-ji in Kyoto.

== Notes ==
Preceded by Kōnin	Era or nengō Tenchō; 824–834	Succeeded by Jōwa
