= Jōwa (Heian period) =

Period of Japanese history (834–848 CE)

Jōwa (承和) was a Japanese era name (年号, nengō; "year name") after Tenchō and before Kashō. This period spanned the years from January 834 through July 848. The reigning emperors were Junna-tennō (淳和天皇) and Ninmyō-tennō (仁明天皇).

== Change of era ==
- February 14, 834 Jōwa gannen (承和元年): The new era name was created to mark an event or series of events. The previous era ended and the new one commenced in Tenchō 10, on the 3rd day of the 1st month of 834.

== Events of the Jōwa era ==
- 834 (Jōwa 1): Emperor Ninmyō planted a cherry tree near the shishinden to replace the tree Emperor Kanmu had planted at the time the capital was established in Kyoto.
- 834 (Jōwa 1): Kūkai is given permission to establish a Shingon chapel at the Imperial Palace.
- June 11, 840 (Jōwa 7, 8th day of the 5th month): The former-Emperor Junna died at the age of 55.
- 843 (Jōwa 10): Work was completed on the multi-volume Nihon Kōki.

By the Jōwa era, the formality of male promotions (Dansei jōi) were announced by the seventh day of each new year, while those for women (Onna jōi) were announced on the eighth day.

== Notes ==
Preceded by Tenchō	Era or nengō Jōwa; 834–848	Succeeded by Kashō
