= Minamoto no Makoto =

Seventh son of the Japanese Emperor Saga

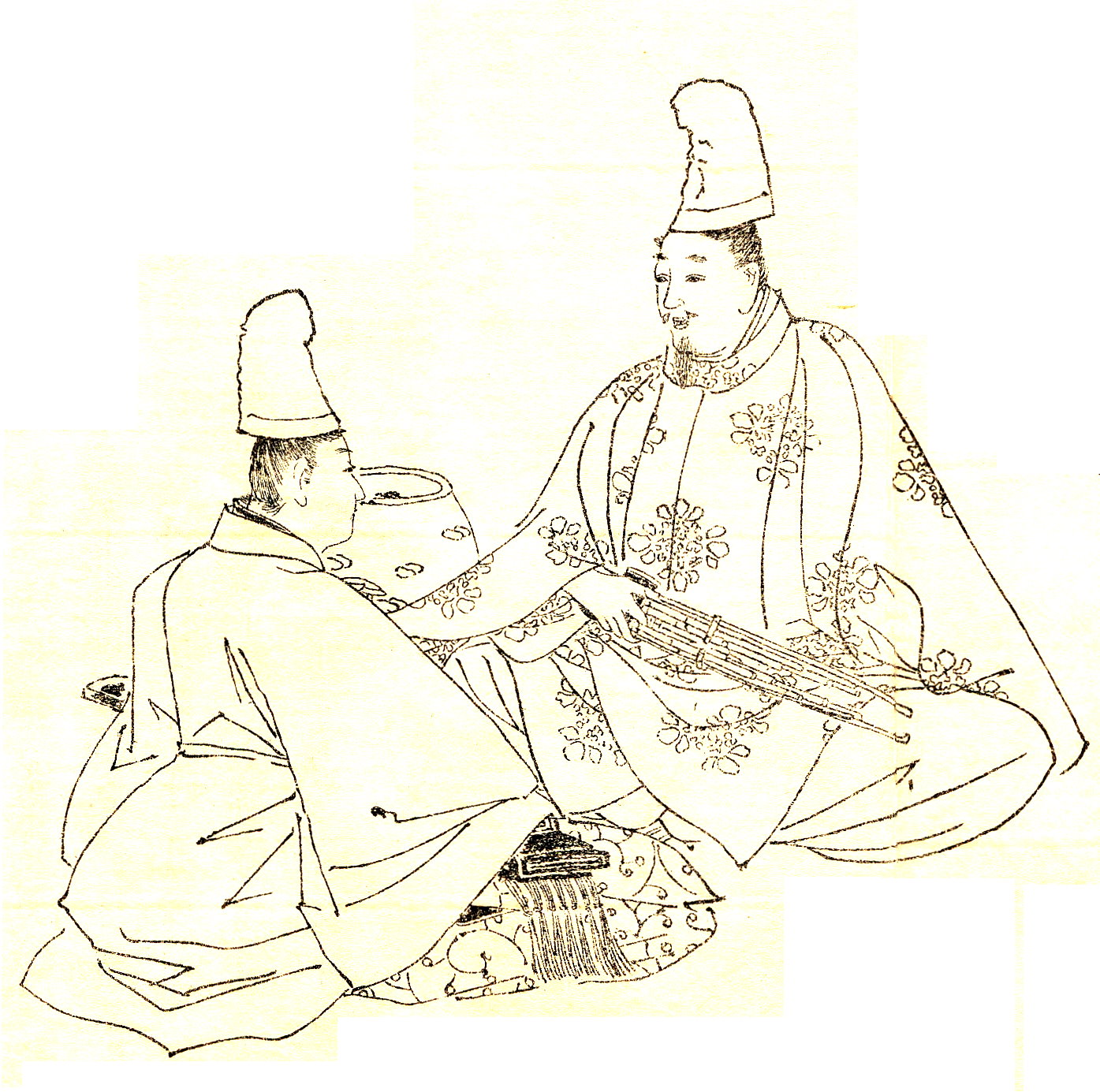
Minamoto no Makoto with his brother by Kikuchi Yōsai

Minamoto no Makoto (源 信; 810 – February 13, 868) was the seventh son of the Japanese emperor Saga, and was the first courtier to be given the name Minamoto. Initially an honorary name given to a number of unrelated courtiers by a number of different emperors, the Minamoto clan would grow to be an integrated clan family, one of the most powerful and most important in all of Japanese history.

Makoto, also known as Kitabe-daijin, was the brother of Emperor Nimmyō, Minamoto no Tokiwa, and Minamoto no Tōru. He received the name "Minamoto" in 814.

Towards the end of his life, in 866, the main gate (Ōtemmon) of the Imperial Palace was destroyed by a fire; in one of the Heian period's more famous events of court intrigues, Makoto was accused by his political rival Tomo no Yoshio of having set the blaze. This came to be known as the "Ōtenmon Conspiracy" (応天門の変, Ōtemmon no Hen); with the help of his powerful connections at court, Makoto was able to successfully argue his innocence. It was later discovered that Ban Tomo set the fire himself.

== See also ==
- Genshin - an unrelated 10th century monk; his name is written using the same characters as Minamoto no Makoto (源信)
