= Shoku Nihon Kōki =

869 Japanese history text

Shoku Nihon Kōki (続日本後紀) is an officially commissioned Japanese history text. Completed in 869, it is the fourth volume in the Six National Histories. It covers the years 833–850.

Following the earlier national history Nihon Kōki (840), in 855 Emperor Montoku ordered the compilation of the years since then. Primarily edited by Fujiwara no Yoshifusa and Haruzumi no Yoshitsuna, the text was completed in 869.

Written in Kanbun-style and contained within 20 volumes, the contents covered 18 years spanning 833 and 850. As opposed to the previous national histories, it is the first to cover a single reign, that of Emperor Ninmyō setting the model for future national histories.

== See also ==
- Ruijū Kokushi, a categorized and chronological history text of the Six National Histories; valuable resource in recreating lost contents of the Shoku Nihon Kōki
