= Emperor Ninmyō =

Emperor of Japan from 833 to 850

Emperor Ninmyō 仁明天皇
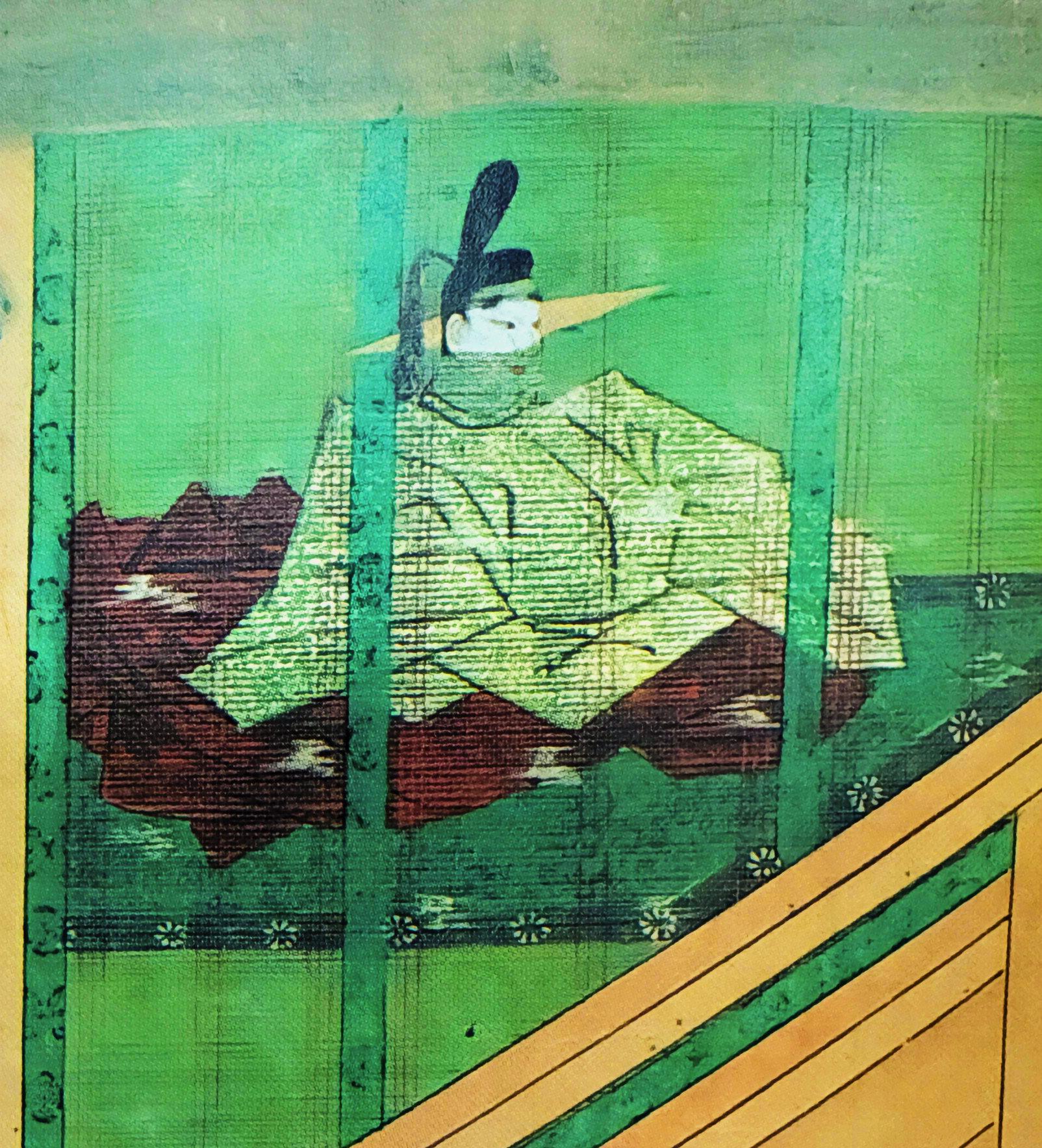

Emperor of Japan
- Reign: 22 March 833 – 4 May 850
- Enthronement: 30 March 833
- Predecessor: Junna
- Successor: Montoku
- Born: Masara (正良); 27 September 808
- Died: 6 May 850 (aged 41); Seiryōden (清凉殿) of Inner Palace
- Burial: Fukakusa no misasagi (深草陵) (Kyoto)
- Issue more...: Emperor Montoku; Emperor Kōkō
Posthumous name
- Chinese-style shigō: Emperor Ninmyō (仁明天皇) Japanese-style shigō: Yamato-neko-amatsumishirushi-toyosato no Mikoto (日本根子天璽豊聡慧尊)
- House: Imperial House of Japan
- Father: Emperor Saga
- Mother: Tachibana no Kachiko

Emperor Ninmyō (仁明天皇, Ninmyō-tennō; 27 September 808 – 6 May 850) was the 54th emperor of Japan, according to the traditional order of succession. Ninmyō's reign lasted from 833 to 850, during the Heian period. His personal name (imina) was Masara (正良). After his death, he was given the title Ninmyō (仁明).

== Biography ==
Ninmyō was the second son of Emperor Saga and the Empress Tachibana no Kachiko. He was the first emperor to be born in Heian-kyo and his birthdate was calculated by later historians based on entries in the Nihon Sandai Jitsuroku. Princess Masako (Empress of Emperor Junna) was his younger sister by the same parents and born in the same year, so it is presumed that she was his twin sister, although there are no historical sources that explicitly state that the Emperor and Princess were twins.

On February 28, 833, he ascended to the throne after his uncle, Emperor Junna, abdicated. Initially, Prince Tsunesada, the son of Emperor Junna, was designated as the heir apparent. However, following the Jōwa Incident of 842, Prince Tsunetsada was deposed, and Prince Michiyasu (Emperor Montoku), the eldest son of Emperor Ninmyō, was appointed Crown Prince. It is said that this was due to the emperor's desire to have his own son succeed to the throne, and a conspiracy by Fujiwara no Yoshifusa, Prince Michiyasu's uncle.

The culture of Tang-style rituals and Chinese poetry and prose, which flourished during the Kōnin and Tenchō eras (810-834), reached its peak during the Jōwa era (834-848). Emperor Ninmyō was fond of classical history, medicine, poetry, calligraphy, music, and archery. One of his poems remains in the Keikokushu.

Emperor Ninmyō was said to have been sickly from a young age, and the Shoku Nihon Koki records various illnesses from around the age of seven. Even after his enthronement, he frequently prepared medicines (elixirs and medicinal herbs) and is said to have possessed knowledge comparable to that of a physician. Furthermore, the entry for the death of Fujiwara no Yoshisuke in the Sandai Jitsuroku states that the Emperor ordered Yoshisuke and other close associates to taste the medicine he had prepared. The Shoku Nihon Koki, in its entry for February 22, 3rd year of Kasho, states that the Emperor participated in a court meeting from behind a curtain, suggesting that he was listening to the discussions while hiding himself from view due to his serious illness (the Emperor died a month later).

In 843, Fumuro no Miyatamaro was accused of plotting rebellion, and his family was exiled. There are various theories regarding the underlying cause of this incident, one of which was that the Fujiwara clan sought to eliminate a potential rival who was also involved in trade.

Ninmyō had nine Empresses, Imperial consorts, and concubines (kōi); and the emperor had 24 Imperial sons and daughters. In 845, Ninmyō suspected an affair between his consort, Mikunimachi, who bore him a son (Sadato, then known as Minamoto no Noboru), and Fujiwara no Arisada, the younger brother of his consort Fujiwara no Sadako and a close confidant since his childhood, and demoted him to a provincial official position.

On March 19, 850, he abdicated in favor of Emperor Montoku due to illness. He died two days later, on March 21 of the same year. He was 41 years old.

== Grave of Emperor Ninmyō ==
The Imperial Household Agency designates Fukakusa no Misasagi (深草陵, Fukakusa Imperial Mausoleum), in Fushimi-ku, Kyoto, as the location of Ninmyō's tomb. Per the Montoku Tennō Jitsuroku Emperor Ninmyō died in the Seiryōden Palace. His son, Emperor Montoku, considered the Seiryōden Palace to be inauspicious and dismantled it, moving it to the side of the mausoleum, where it became a temple called Kashō-dō, which maintained the grave. This became the first instance of the Seiryōden Palace being rebuilt during the Heian period. Later, the temple was renamed Jōgan-ji (per the Nihon Sandai Jitsuroku). It was listed in the Engishiki under "Imperial tombs; however, by the end of the Kamakura period, the temple had been abolished and the location of the grave unknown. During the Edo period, in 1862-1863, during the Bunkyū Restoration of Mausoleums, the current location (Higashi Kurumazuka) was officially designated as Emperor Ninmyō's mausoleum.

=== Events of Ninmyō's life ===
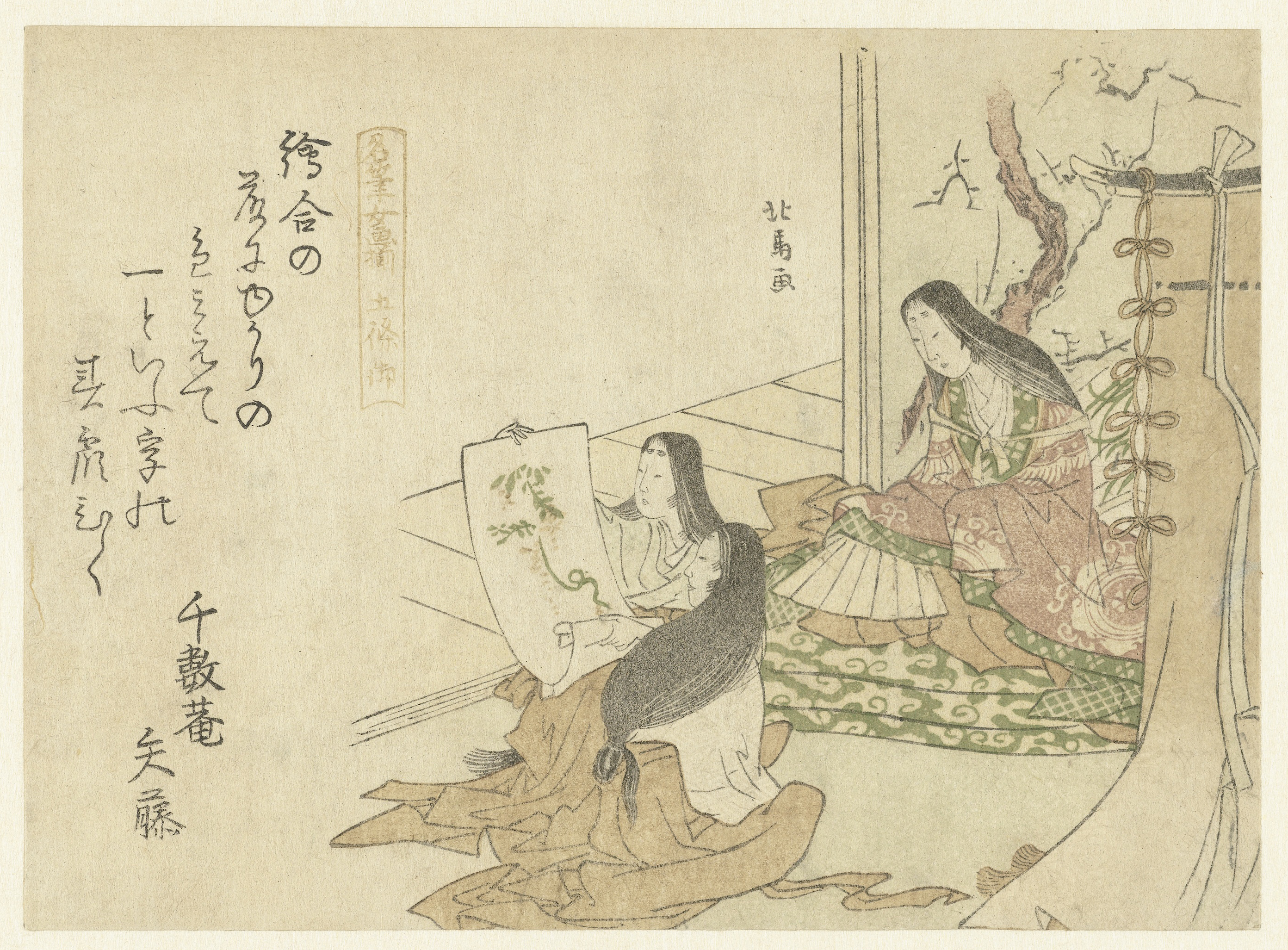
Fujiwara no Junshi, print by Teisai Hokuba, 1800 and 1805, (Rijksmuseum Amsterdam)

Ninmyō ascended to the throne following the abdication of his uncle, Emperor Junna.

- 6 January 823 (Kōnin 10, 4th month, 19th day): Received the title of Crown Prince at the age of 14.
- 22 March 833 (Tenchō 10, 28th day of the 2nd month): In the 10th year of Emperor Junna's reign, the emperor abdicated; and the succession (senso) was received by his adopted son. Masara-shinnō was the natural son of Emperor Saga, and therefore would have been Junna's nephew. Shortly thereafter, Emperor Ninmyo is said to have acceded to the throne (sokui).

Shortly after Ninmyo was enthroned, he designated an heir. He named Prince Tsunesada, a son of former Emperor Junna, as the crown prince.

- 835 (Jōwa 2): Kūkai (known posthumously as Kōbō-Daishi) died. This monk, scholar, poet, and artist had been the founder of the Shingon or "True Word" school of Buddhism.
- 838-839 (Jōwa 5-6): Diplomatic mission to Tang China headed by Fujiwara no Tsunetsugu.
- 842: Following a coup d'état called the Jōwa Incident, Tsunesada the crown prince was replaced with Ninmyō's first son, Prince Michiyasu (later Emperor Montoku) whose mother was the Empress Fujiwara no Junshi, a daughter of sadaijin Fujiwara no Fuyutsugu. It is supposed that this was the result of political intrigue planned by Ninmyō and Fujiwara no Yoshifusa. The first of what would become a powerful line of Fujiwara regents, Yoshifusa had numerous family ties to the imperial court; he was Ninmyō's brother in law (by virtue of his sister who became Ninmyō's consort), the second son of sadaijin Fuyutsugu, and uncle to the new crown prince.

In his lifetime, Ninmyō could not have anticipated that his third son, Prince Tokiyasu, would eventually ascend the throne in 884 as Emperor Kōkō.

- 6 May 850 (Kashō 3, 21st day of the 3rd month): Emperor Ninmyō died at the age of 41. He was sometimes posthumously referred to as "the Emperor of Fukakusa", because that was the name given to his tomb.

=== Eras of Ninmyō's reign ===
The years of Ninmyō's reign are more specifically identified by more than one era name (nengō).

- Tenchō (824–834)
- Jōwa (834–848)
- Kashō (848–851)

== Kugyō ==
Kugyō (公卿) is a collective term for the very few most powerful men attached to the court of the Emperor of Japan in pre-Meiji eras.

In general, this elite group included only three to four men at a time. These were hereditary courtiers whose experience and background would have brought them to the pinnacle of a life's career. During Ninmyō's reign, this apex of the Daijō-kan included:

- Sadaijin, Fujiwara no Otsugu (藤原緒嗣), 773–843.
- Sadaijin, Minamoto no Tokiwa (源常), 812–854.
- Udaijin, Kiyohara no Natsuno (清原夏野), 782–837.
- Udaijin, Fujiwara no Mimori (藤原三守), d. 840.
- Udaijin, Minamoto no Tokiwa (源常)
- Udaijin, Tachibana no Ujikimi (橘氏公), 783–847.
- Udaijin, Fujiwara no Yoshifusa (藤原良房), 804–872.
- Udaijin, Fujiwara no Otsugu, 825–832
- Naidaijin (not appointed)
- Dainagon, Fujiwara no Otsugu, ?–825.

== Consorts and children ==
Consort (Nyōgo) later Empress Dowager (Tai-Kōtaigō): Fujiwara no Junshi (藤原順子; 809–871), Fujiwara no Fuyutsugu’s daughter

- First Son: Imperial Prince Michiyasu (道康親王) later Emperor Montoku

Consort (Nyōgo): Fujiwara no Takushi/Sawako (藤原沢子; d.839), Fujiwara no Fusatsugu’s daughter

- Second Son: Imperial Prince Muneyasu (宗康親王; 828–868)
- Third Son: Imperial Prince Tokiyasu (時康親王) later Emperor Kōkō
- Fourth Son: Imperial Prince Saneyasu (人康親王; 831–872)
- Imperial Princess Shinshi (新子内親王; d.897)

Consort (Nyōgo): Fujiwara no Teishi/Sadako (藤原貞子; d.864), Fujiwara no Tadamori’s daughter

- Eighth Son: Imperial Prince Nariyasu (成康親王; 836–853)
- Imperial Princess Shinshi (親子内親王; d. 851)
- Imperial Princess Heishi (平子内親王; d. 877)

Court lady: Shigeno no Tsunako (滋野縄子), Shigeno no Sadanushi’s daughter

- fifth Son: Imperial Prince Motoyasu (本康親王; d. 902)
- Ninth Daughter: Imperial Princess Tokiko (時子内親王; d. 847), 2nd Saiin in Kamo Shrine 831–833
- Imperial Princess Jūshi (柔子内親王; d. 869)

Consort (Nyōgo): Tachibana no Kageko (橘影子; d. 864), Tachibana no Ujikimi’s daughter

Consort (Nyōgo): Fujiwara Musuko (藤原息子)

Court Attendant (Koui): Ki no Taneko (紀種子; d. 869), Ki no Natora’s daughter

- Seventh Prince: Imperial Prince Tsuneyasu (常康親王; d. 869)
- Imperial Princess Shinshi/Saneko (真子内親王; d. 870)

Court Attendant (Koui) (deposed in 845): Mikuni-machi (三国町), daughter of Mikuni clan

- Sada no Noboru (貞登), given the family name "Sada" from Emperor (Shisei Kōka, 賜姓降下) in 866

Court lady: Fujiwara no Katoko (藤原賀登子), Fujiwara no Fukutomaro's daughter

- Sixth Son: Imperial Prince Kuniyasu (国康親王; d. 898)

Court lady: Fujiwara no Warawako (藤原小童子), Fujiwara no Michitō's daughter

- Imperial Princess Shigeko (重子内親王; d. 865)

Court lady: Princess Takamune (高宗女王), Prince Okaya's daughter

- Seventh/eighth Daughter: Imperial Princess Hisako (久子内親王; d. 876), 18th Saiō in Ise Shrine 833–850.

Court lady: daughter of Yamaguchi clan (山口氏の娘)

- Minamoto no Satoru (源覚; 849–879)

Nyoju: Kudaraō Toyofuku's daughter

- Minamoto no Masaru (源多; 831–888), Udaijin 882–888
- Minamoto no Hikaru (源光; 846–913), Udaijin 901–913

Court lady (Nyoju): Kudara no Yōkyō (百済永慶), Kudara no Kyōfuku's daughter

- Twelfth Daughter: Imperial Princess Takaiko (高子内親王; d. 866), 3rd Saiin in Kamo Shrine 833–850

(from unknown women)

- Minamoto no Suzushi (源冷; 835–890), Sangi 882–890
- Minamoto no Itaru (源効)

== Ancestry ==
Ancestors of Emperor Ninmyō

8. Emperor Kōnin (709–782)
4. Emperor Kanmu (737–806)
9. Takano no Niigasa (c. 720–790)
2. Emperor Saga (786–842)
10. Fujiwara no Yoshitsugu (716–777)
5. Fujiwara no Otomuro (760–790)
11. Abe no Komina (d. 784)
1. Emperor Ninmyō
12. Tachibana no Naramaro (721–757)
6. Tachibana no Kiyotomo (758–789)
13. Awata
3. Tachibana no Kachiko (786–850)
7. Taguchi Michihime

== See also ==
- Emperor Go-Fukakusa, a later emperor named in honor of Emperor Ninmyō
- Imperial cult
- List of Emperors of Japan
- Shoku Nihon Kōki, a Japanese national history covering Emperor Ninmyō's reign.

== Notes ==
Japanese Imperial kamon — a stylized chrysanthemum blossom

Regnal titles
| Preceded by Emperor Junna | Emperor of Japan: Ninmyō; 833–850 | Succeeded by Emperor Montoku |
