= Fujiwara no Yoshifusa =

9th Century Japanese statesman and Regent to the Emperor

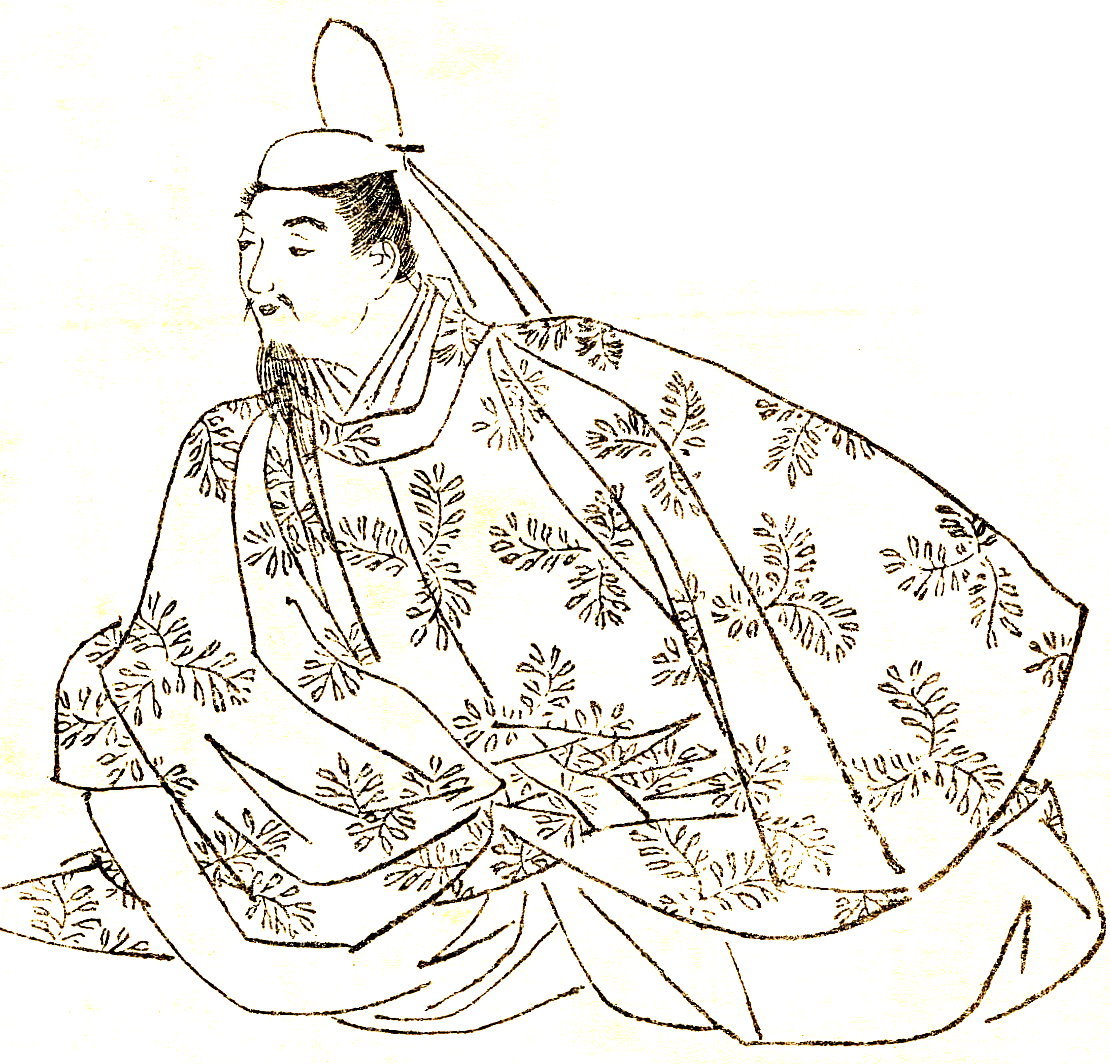
Fujiwara no Yoshifusa by Kikuchi Yōsai

Fujiwara no Yoshifusa (藤原 良房; 804 – October 7, 872), also known as Somedono no Daijin or Shirakawa-dono, was a Japanese statesman, courtier and politician during the Heian period.

When Yoshifusa's grandson was enthroned as Emperor Seiwa, Yoshifusa assumed the role of regent (sesshō) for the young monarch. He was the first sesshō in Japanese history who was not himself of imperial rank; and he was the first of a series of regents from the Fujiwara clan.

== Career ==
He was a minister during the reigns of Emperor Ninmyō, Emperor Montoku and Emperor Seiwa.

- 834 (Jōwa 1, 9th day of the 7th month): Sangi
- 835 (Jōwa 2): Gon-no-Chūnagon
- 840 (Jōwa 7): Chūnagon
- 842 (Jōwa 9): Dainagon
- 848 (Saikō 1, 1st month): Udaijin
- 857 (Saikō 4, 19th day of the 2nd month): Daijō Daijin
- 858 (Ten'an 2, 7th day of the 11th month): Sesshō for Emperor Seiwa.
- October 7, 872 (Jōgan 14, 2nd day of the 9th month): Yoshifusa died at the age of 69.

Yoshifusa conceived the programme of boy-sovereigns with Fujiwara regents; and his adopted son, Mototsune, carried out the plans.

== Genealogy ==
This member of the Fujiwara clan was the son of Fujiwara no Fuyutsugu. Yoshifusa's brothers were Fujiwara no Nagayoshi, Fujiwara no Yoshisuke and Fujiwara no Yoshikado.

== Marriages and children ==
He was married to Minamoto no Kiyohime (源 潔姫), daughter of Emperor Saga.

They had only one daughter.

- Akirakeiko/Meishi (明子) (829–899), consort of Emperor Montoku

He adopted his brother Nagara's third son.

- Mototsune (基経) (836–891) – Daijō Daijin and Kampaku

Yoshifusa is referred to as Chūjin Kō (忠仁公) (posthumous title was Daijō Daijin).

== See also ==
- Fujiwara Regents
- Shoku Nihon Kōki, one of the Six National Histories of Japan; edited by Fujiwara no Yoshifusa.
