= Saikō =

Period of Japanese history (854–857 CE)

Saikō (斉衡) was a Japanese era name (年号, nengō; "year name") after Ninju and before Ten'an. This period spanned the years from November 854 through February 857. The reigning emperor was Montoku-tennō (文徳天皇).

== Change of era ==
- February 1, 854 Saikō gannen (斉衡元年): The new era name was created to mark an event or series of events. The previous era ended and the new one commenced in Ninju 4, on the 29th day of the 11th month of 854.

== Events of the Saikō era ==
- April 21, 854 (Saikō 1, 13th day of the 6th month): The sadaijin Minamoto no Tokiwa, also known as Minamoto no Tsune, died at age 43.
- 855 (Saikō 2, 1st month): The Emishi organized a rebellion; and in response, a force of 1,000 men and provisions were sent to the north.
- 855 (Saikō 2, 5th month): The head of the great statue of Buddha in the Tōdai-ji fell off; and in consequence, the emperor ordered the then dainagon Fujiwara no Yoshisuke, the brother of sadaijin Yoshifusa, to be in charge of gathering the gifts of the pious from throughout the empire to make another head for the Daibutsu.

== Notes ==
Preceded by Ninju	Era or nengō Saikō; 854–857	Succeeded by Ten'an
