= Ten'an =

Period of Japanese history (857–859 CE)

Ten'an (天安) was a Japanese era name (年号, nengō, "year name") after Saikō and before Jōgan. This period spanned the years from February 857 through April 859. The reigning emperors were Montoku-tennō (文徳天皇) and Seiwa-tennō (清和天皇).

== Change of Era ==
- January 30, 857 Ten'an gannen (天安元年): The new era name was created to mark an event or series of events. The previous era ended, and the new one commenced in Saikō 4, on the 21st day of the 2nd month of 857.

== Events of the Ten'an era ==
- September 27, 858 (Ten'an 2, 27th day of the 8th month): Emperor Montoku dies. Korehito-shinnō receives the succession (senso). Shortly thereafter, Emperor Seiwa formally accedes to the throne (sokui).
- September 27, 858 (Ten'an 2, 27th day of the 8th month): In the 8th year of Montoku-tennō's reign (文徳天皇8年), the emperor abdicated; and the succession (senso) was received by his son. Shortly thereafter, Emperor Seiwa is said to have acceded to the throne (sokui).
- December 15, 858 (Ten'an 2, 7th day of the 11th month): The emperor's official announcement of his enthronement at age 9 was accompanied by the appointment or his grandfather as regent (sesshō). This is the first time that this high honor has been accorded to a member of the Fujiwara family, and it is also the first example in Japan of the accession of an heir who is too young to be emperor. The proclamation of the beginning of Seiwa's reign was made at the Ise Shrine (Kotai-jingu) at Ise and at all the tombs of the imperial family.

== Notes ==
Preceded by Saikō	Era or nengō Ten'an; 857–859	Succeeded by Jōgan
