= Yingtian Gate =

Southern gate of ancient Luoyang, China

Coordinates: 34.6771°N 112.4547°E

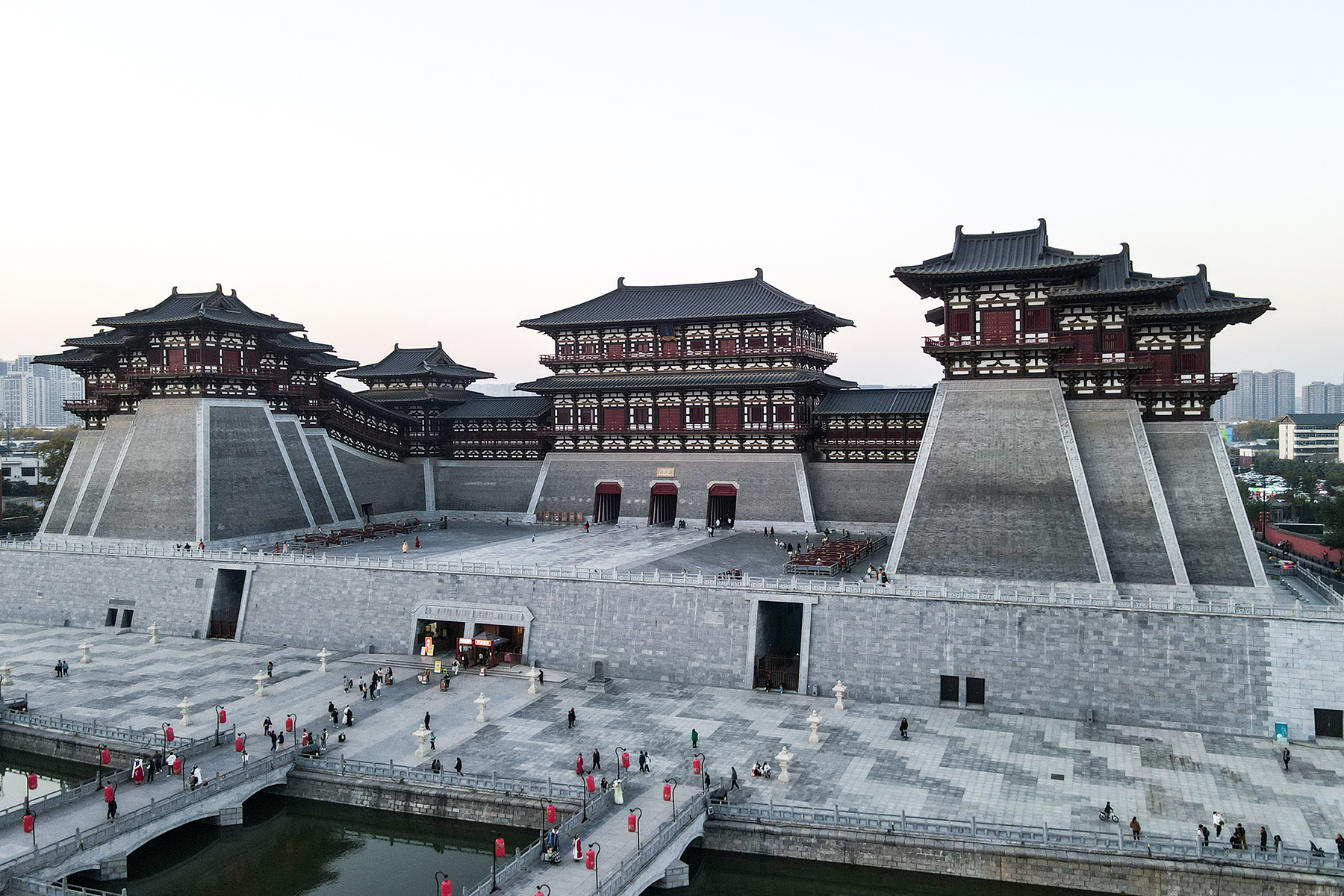
2016 reconstruction of the Yingtian Gate, Luoyang

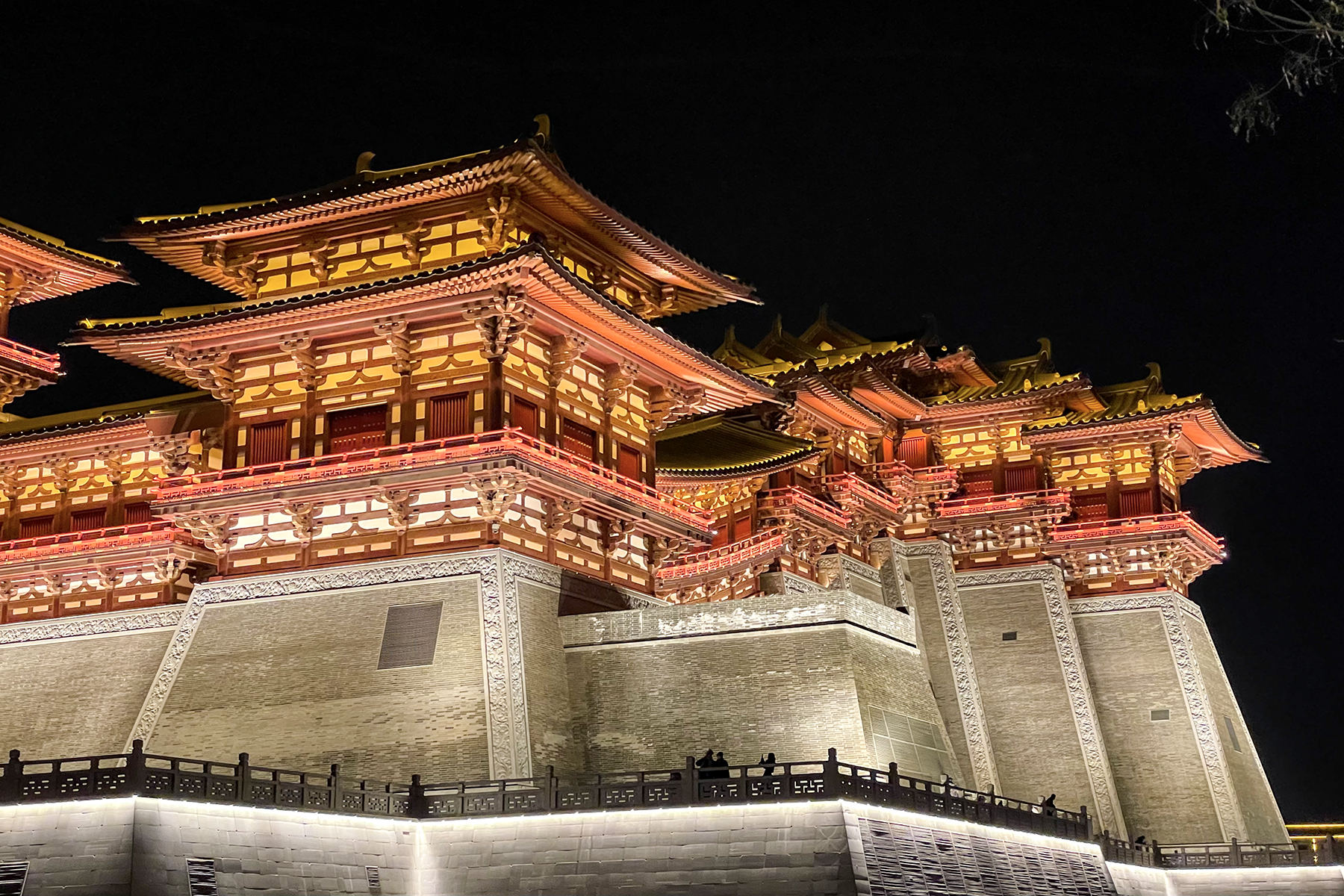
Reconstruction of the Yingtian Gate, Luoyang

The Yingtian Gate, Ying Tian Men (simplified Chinese: 应天门; traditional Chinese: 應天門) was the southern gate of the imperial palace in Luoyang during the Sui and Tang dynasties, and it may have been the largest city gate in ancient China. Ancient Japan constructed capital gates with the same names Ōtenmon (応天門) in the cities of Heian-kyō (present-day Kyoto) and Heijō-kyō (present-day Nara).

== Yingtian Gate in Luoyang ==
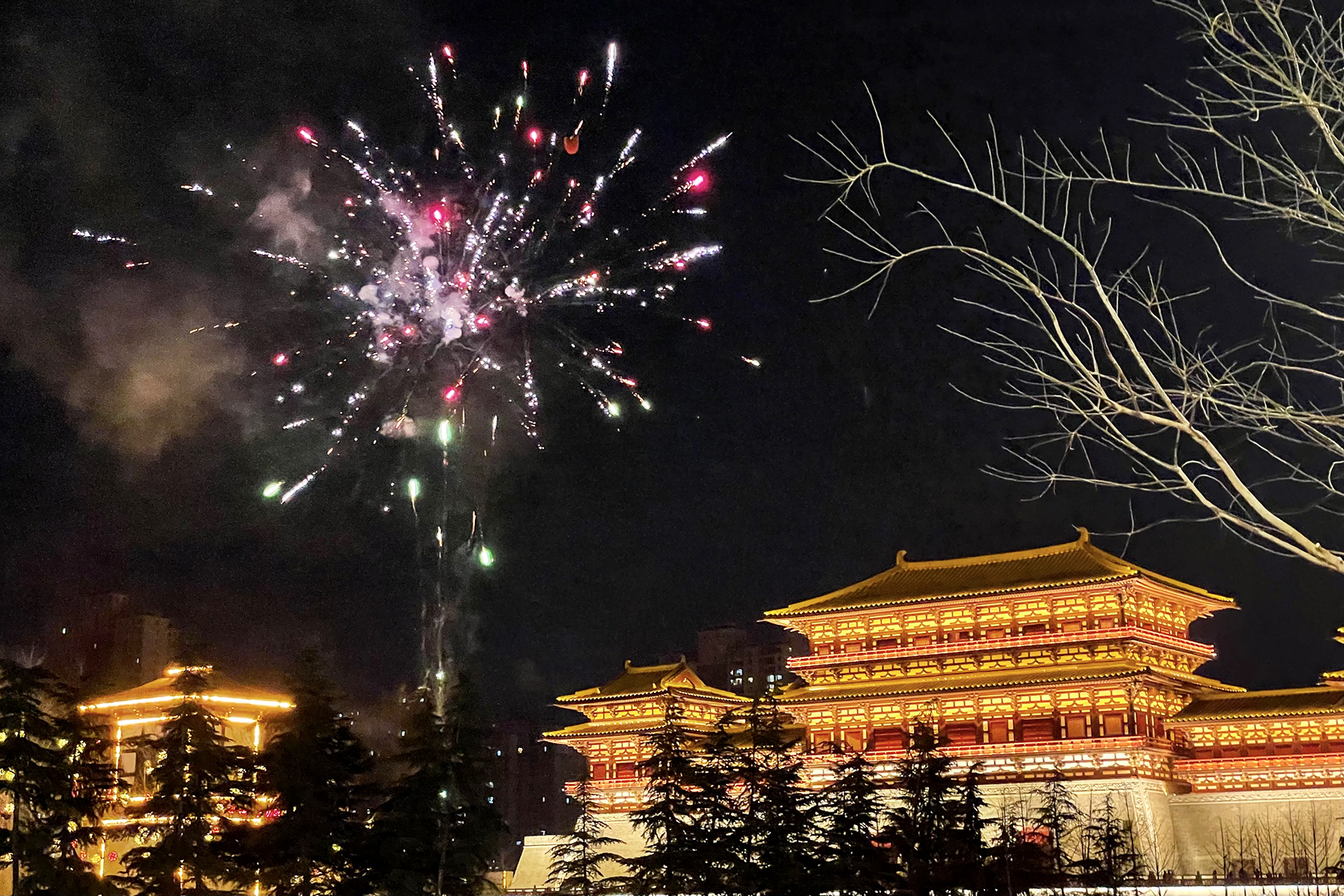
Reconstruction of the Yingtian Gate, Luoyang

It was originally built in 605 AD, the first year of the Daye era of the Sui dynasty, and was initially named the Zetian Gate (則天門). In 705 AD, the first year of the Shenlong era, the gate's name was changed to Yingtian Gate to avoid the naming taboo of Empress Wu Zetian. The gate was destroyed during the Northern Song dynasty and was reconstructed at its original site in 2016.

The Yingtian Gate served as a ceremonial and celebratory venue for the Sui, Tang, and Wuzhou dynasties under Empress Wu Zetian's rule. Emperor Gaozong of Tang once issued an edict here to release King Uija of Baekje, and Empress Wu Zetian ascended to the throne and declared herself emperor at this location. The emperors also received foreign envoys, such as the Japanese envoys to Sui and Tang, at the Yingtian Gate.

The 2016 reconstruction project cost approximately 350 million yuan (RMB) and was designed by architect Guo Daiheng. The city gate stands 120 Chinese feet tall (equivalent to 35 meters today), has a depth of 25 meters, and is situated on a 9.2-meter-high base. The base measures 137 meters in width from east to west and has a north–south depth of 60 meters. The base houses a museum that showcases the ancient ruins of the Yingtian Gate. After its reconstruction, the Yingtian Gate serves as a city landmark and features a public square where citizens can visit and relax.

== Ōtenmon in Heijō-kyō ==
Only the foundation base remains. The main gate of the Chōdō-in, directly north of the Suzaku Gate, offers a view of the Kaishō Gate ruins and the Daigoku-den from there. The structure is smaller in scale compared to the Suzaku Gate, approximately the size of the Ōten-mon at Heian Shrine.

== Ōtenmon in Heian-kyō ==
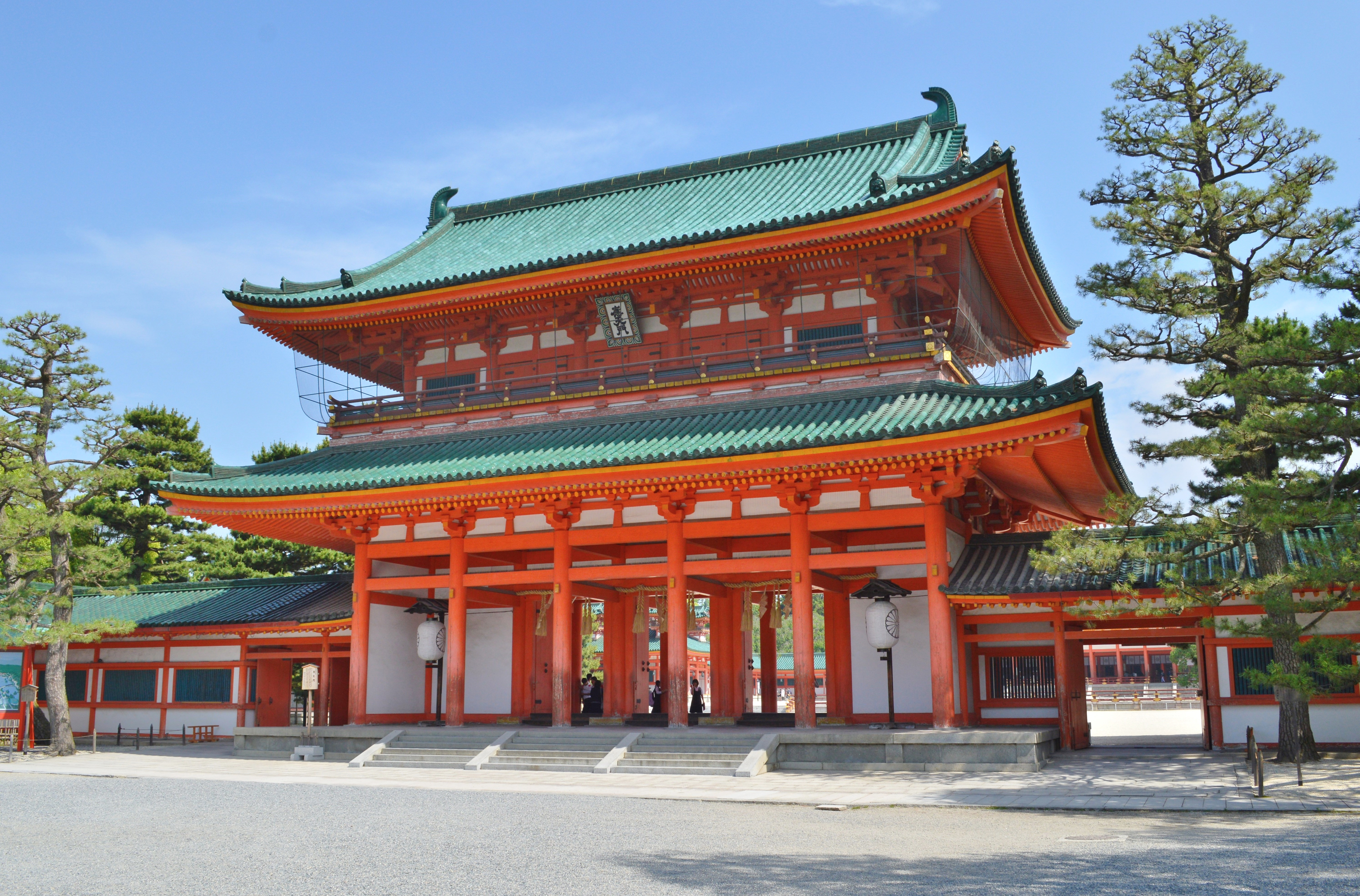
Heian-jingu, Otenmon

The Ōten-mon, located within the inner area of the Daidairi (Great Imperial Palace), was the main gate of the Chōdō-in (also known as Hasshō-in), a site where governmental affairs and important court ceremonies were conducted. It was situated immediately north of the Suzaku Gate and was considered one of the key gates alongside the Suzaku Gate and the Kaishō Gate. The location is believed to be near the area where the Shusse Inari Shrine stood until 2012 (around the southwestern boundary between Kamigyō-ku and Nakagyō-ku, Kyoto City). However, there is no monument marking the site today.

The gate's plaque is said to have been written by Kūkai (Kōbō Daishi). The Japanese proverb "Even Kōbō makes mistakes with his brush" (弘法にも筆の誤り) originates from a legend where Kūkai, while writing the plaque for the Ōten-mon, accidentally forgot to add the first dot in the character "應" (Shinjitai: 応). According to the story, rather than taking the plaque down, he threw his brush at the plaque to correct the omission.

The Ōten-mon is also famous for the "Ōten-mon Incident" in 866 (Jōgan 8), when it was set on fire. The gate was repeatedly destroyed and rebuilt over time but was lost in the Great Fire of 1177 (Jishō 1) and was never reconstructed afterward. During one of the reconstructions after the Ōten-mon Incident, there were discussions about renaming the gate.

The Ōten-mon at Heian Shrine is modeled after the Ōten-mon of Heian-kyō at 5/8 of its original scale.
