= Tomo no Yoshio =

Japanese court advisor (9th century)

Tomo no Yoshio (伴善男), or Ban Dainagon (伴大納言), was a counselor of the state in pre-feudal Japan. After his death, he was seen as a goryō associated with pestilence.

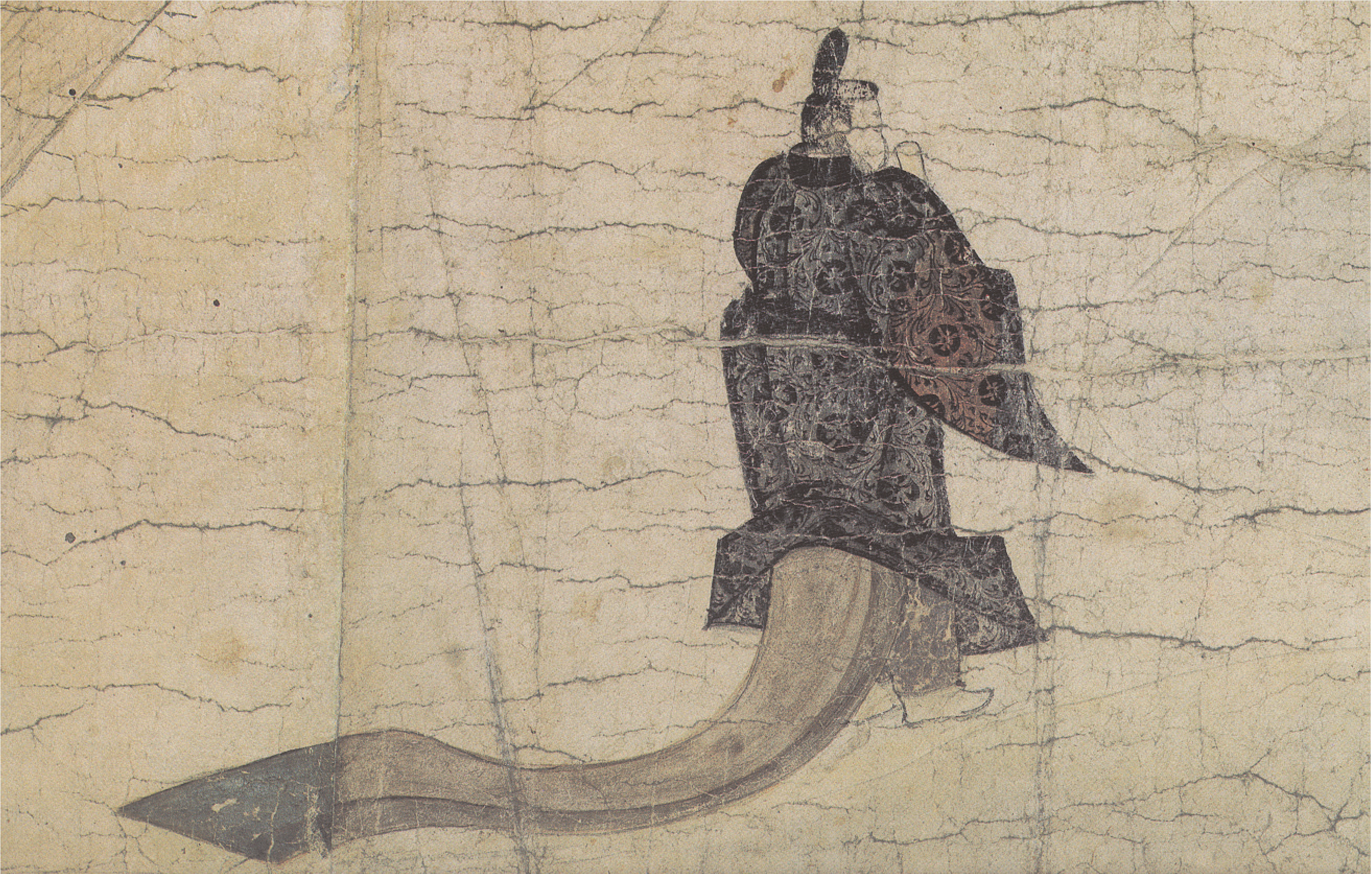

== Arson ==
On the tenth day of the third month of 866, Tomo no Yoshio set fire to the Ōtenmon gate with the intent of placing blame on the minister of the left, the sadajin Minamoto no Makoto. Arson was considered a serious crime in Japan, and the punishment was typically execution. However, Yoshio was able to convince the minister on the right, Udajin Fujiwara no Yoshimi, that Makoto was behind the arson. As a result, Yoshimi attempted to get the counselor, Fujiwara no Mototsune, to arrest Makoto. Instead of making the arrest, Mototsune informed his father, the Daijō Daijin, Fujiwara no Yoshifusa, of the situation. Yoshifusa was unconvinced that Makoto could do such a heinous crime and called for the emperor in an attempt to vouch for Makoto's innocence and straighten out the matter at hand. As a result, Makoto was left unpunished, and a consolation was sent to him. It wasn't until the eighth month of that year, that the burning of Ōtenmon gate was attributed to Tomo no Yoshio and his allies, due to a report made by Ōyake no Takatori. A thorough investigation was carried out and on the twenty-second day of the ninth month, Tomo no Yoshio was exiled to Izu Province. This story has been passed down through story telling for many generations, becoming widely known. The historical account can be found in Sandai Jitsuroku.

== Cultural references ==
“The story of a cook who saw the ghost of counselor Tomo” is the eleventh story of the 27th volume of Konjaku Monogatarishū. In the story, Ban no Yoshio appears in front of a cook after a late night of work and describes himself as a god of pestilence and disease. He relays his life's story, admitting that he committed a serious crime. Although the crime is not detailed there, it clearly refers to the burning of Ōtenmon gate and his exile to Izu as punishment. The story portrays Ban no Yoshio's knowledge of the seriousness of his act and the justice of his punishment. He acknowledges his debt, owed to the country for being so well-treated during his service at court, and describes his hand in turning an epidemic that would have killed all, into a mere cough; suggesting this as some form of reciprocity.
