= The Pillow Book =

1002 book by Sei Shōnagon

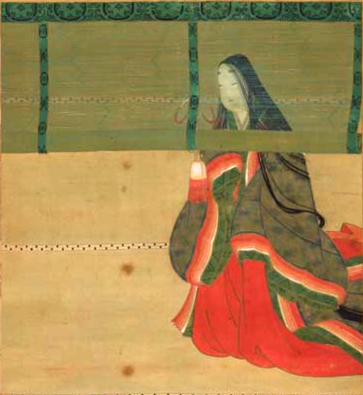
Sei Shōnagon in a late 17th-century illustration

The Pillow Book (枕草子, Makura no Sōshi) is a book of observations and musings recorded by Sei Shōnagon during her time as court lady to the Empress Consort Fujiwara no Teishi during the 990s and early 1000s in the Heian period of Japan. The book was completed in the year 1002.

The work is a collection of essays, anecdotes, poems, and descriptive passages that have little connection to one another, except that they express ideas and whims of Shōnagon, spurred by moments in her daily life. Shōnagon meant her writing in The Pillow Book to be private, but part of it was accidentally revealed to the court during her life: "[S]he inadvertently left it [her writing] on a cushion she put out for a visiting guest, who eagerly carried it off despite her pleas." She wrote The Pillow Book for her own enjoyment; it seemed to be a way for her to express thoughts and feelings that she was not allowed to state publicly due to her lower status in the court. Although Shōnagon never intended her work for any eyes other than her own, over the centuries it has become a famous literary work. Six passages from the book were first translated into English in 1889 by T. A. Purcell and W. G. Aston. Other notable English translations have been the partial translation by Arthur Waley in 1928, the first complete translation by Ivan Morris in 1967, and Meredith McKinney's complete translation in 2006.

== Overview ==
Starting with the "exhaustiveness" of the "collection of similar things" and how it is represented by "as for worms", "as for the flowers of trees", "hateful things", and "things of beauty" – which have been described anachronistically as "Borgesian lists" – author Sei Shōnagon's "Ramblings" observe the nature of everyday life and the four seasons, and describe in diverse sentences "her recollections" (her diary) that look back at the society of the imperial court surrounding Empress Teishi whom she served, among other things.

According to translator Meredith McKinney, The Pillow Book is a "special case", "a genre-bending miscellany of short, largely unrelated pieces". Shōnagon's writing is categorized into three parts; the first consists of narratives, which focus mainly on the events that she witnessed and experienced during her time in the court, the second consists of her own thoughts and opinions on various matters and topics, and the third were the famous lists, or headings, with one example from Shōnagon's writing being "Things That Make the Heart Grow Fonder." The Pillow Book consists of 164 of these lists total, where they range from aesthetically pleasing items to being less diplomatic than Shōnagon's anecdotes. Three types of classification were proposed by Kikan Ikeda. However, there are sections that are rather ambiguous and are difficult to classify (e.g., in the first paragraph of her ramblings, "As for Spring, (it is) the dawn [that is lovely]", there are objections to common opinions of what is actually meant here).

It is composed primarily in Japanese hiragana, which is a syllabary that is actually derived from Chinese characters, and generally many of her short stories were written in a witty literary style. This style of writing was the native tongue for women in that time period and was used more often by women like Shōnagon. According to Matthew Penney, the only Chinese terms that actually appear in The Pillow Book are in the place-names and personal titles, and the rest is classified as original hiragana. Confessions of her personal feelings are mixed into her writing with occasionally subtle sentimentality that reflects the downfall of the emperor's adviser, Fujiwara no Michitaka (empress Teishi's biological father), as well as the misfortune of both Emperor and Empress Teishi.

Both the author's sophisticated sense and her eye for particular things are fused; for if one compares the sentimentality of mono no aware (the Pathos of Things) as found in The Tale of Genji, similar beauty of the world is revealed through the use of the intellectual word okashi ('lovely') in this piece.

In general, The Pillow Book is written in brief statements, where the length of one paragraph is relatively short, and it is easy to read the contents, even for modern Japanese speakers. The miscellaneous collection has been arranged loosely into three specific types, while the collection of similar things has been compiled by distinct classification, and this so-called compiling was done afterwards by the hands of people other than Sei Shōnagon. Based on the beliefs of certain scholars, most of Shonagon's work was written during her time working in the court; however, some of the later entries were written in her later life, and were just based on her memories of the days and moments she experienced previously in the court.

An aspect that makes Shōnagon's writing in The Pillow Book different from other written diaries of her period and even modern day journals is the fact that she did not invest her time in soul-searching, nor was she searching for the attention or opinions of readers, simply because she did not invest in her writing for others, but only for herself. Shōnagon's focus in The Pillow Book is based on the likes and dislikes of the world, what she is interested in personally, and the delightedness of the world that she viewed and lived in. In the Kyoto Journal article, McKinney explains that Shōnagon is "engaging you [the reader], face to face across the centuries, assuming your familiarity with her and her world, compelling you to nod and smile." The Pillow Book is a collection of anecdotes, lists, and assorted writings that is one of the best sources of information concerning the court society of the 10th century and is considered an influential landmark in the history of Japanese literature. The Pillow Book is written entirely in Japanese. During the late 10th and early 11th centuries, Japanese men typically wrote in Chinese, using characters, while Japanese women wrote exclusively in their native tongue, using hiragana, a syllabary derived from Chinese characters. The Pillow Book is a part of a large tradition of women's literature. The simplicity and charm of Shōnagon's style has been used as an example of the finest Japanese prose to this day. Shōnagon has been described as arrogant and confrontational by many readers, though they describe her as freely expressing her feelings with sharp wit.

The Pillow Book influenced a genre of Japanese writings known as zuihitsu ('assorted writing').

== Background ==
The Heian period was essential to the aristocratic people. Poetry and vibrant art were a big part in the imperial court, of which Shōnagon was a part. The people in the imperial court were expected to be well educated in writing. Literature was seen as a "key part in social interaction." One's writing skills could make or break their reputation. For example, Shōnagon mentions in The Pillow Book how a courtier asked her for advice for writing a poem and she had to turn him away because of his poor writing skills. During the Heian period, women had a role in society, especially those women who were considered to be upper-class. Female authors in Japan during this time were more popular since they wrote in Japanese, which was considered the "people's language," and the male authors wrote in Chinese since that was considered to be of higher status. Since female authors' works were more popular with the common people, it is safe to assume that their works influenced society.

Despite women in the Heian period still being less socially important than men, the writers studied today for their creativity and wordplay wrote in hiragana. Males tended to use kanji exclusively in order to demonstrate their command of a writing system borrowed from their neighbour, China. The newer, exclusively Japanese hiragana was used by women. It used characters for syllables allowing more freedom to express inner thoughts than the logographic kanji. Since women were excluded from public life during the Heian period, upper-class, better-educated women had vast amounts of time to write. This removal from the public sector also sheltered women from political turmoil. Hiragana allowed women to convey their thoughts and feelings regarding their lives in a language all their own. Extensive schooling was not necessary in order to describe every feeling on paper; and the syllabic hiragana could note inflections heard in speech, unlike kanji. Educated women, like Shōnagon, did occasionally use kanji. Due to it being considered male writing, for a woman to properly use and understand it demonstrated her years of study. It was a way for Shōnagon to show her intelligence simply through her way of writing.

== Textual history and English translations ==
The Pillow Book was circulated at court, and for several hundred years existed in handwritten manuscripts. First printed in the 17th century, it exists in different versions: the order of entries may have been changed by scribes with comments and passages added, edited, or deleted. Four main variants of the text are known to modern scholars. The two considered to be the most complete and accurate are the Sankanbon and Nōinbon texts. Later editors introduced section numbers and divisions; the Sankanbon text is divided into 297 sections, with an additional 29 "supplemental" sections which may represent later additions by the author or copyists.

=== English Translations ===
- Sei Shōnagon (1888–1889), "A Literary Lady of Old Japan", Transactions of the Asiatic Society of Japan, 16, translated by T. A. Purcell; W. G. Aston: 215–224.
- Sei Shōnagon (1928), The Pillow Book of Sei Shōnagon, translated by Arthur Waley, London: George Allen & Unwin.
- Sei Shōnagon (1971) [1967], The Pillow Book of Sei Shōnagon, translated by Ivan Morris, London: Penguin Books, ISBN 0-14-044236-7.
- Sei Shōnagon (2006), The Pillow Book, translated by Meredith McKinney, London: Penguin Books, ISBN 0-14-044806-3.

Machiko Midorikawa describes McKinney's translation as "much more accurate than Morris's".

== Other pillow books ==
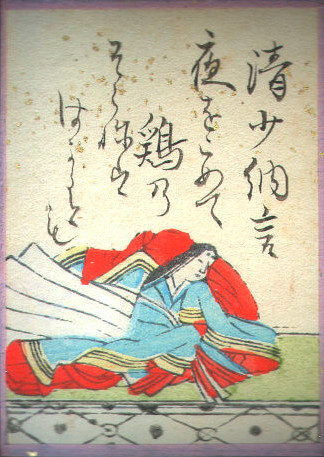
Sei Shōnagon, illustration from an issue of Hyakunin Isshu (Edo period)

More generally, a pillow book is a collection of notebooks or notes which have been collated to show a period of someone or something's life. In Japan, such kind of idle notes are generally referred to as the zuihitsu genre. Other major works from the same period include Kamo no Chōmei's Hōjōki and Yoshida Kenkō's Tsurezuregusa. Zuihitsu rose to mainstream popularity in the Edo period, when it found a wide audience in the newly developed merchant classes. Furthermore, it gained a scholarly foothold, as Japanese classical scholars began customarily writing in the zuihitsu style. Reputable authors from this movement include Motoori Norinaga, Yokoi Yayu, and Matsudaira Sadanobu.

Peter Greenaway released his film The Pillow Book in 1996. Starring Vivian Wu and Ewan McGregor, it tells a modern story that references Sei Shōnagon's work.

The Pillow Book is also the name of a series of radio thrillers written by Robert Forrest and broadcast on BBC Radio 4's Woman's Hour Drama. These are detective stories with Sei Shōnagon as a principal character and feature many of her lists.

== See also ==
- Heian literature
- Zuihitsu
- Nikki bungaku
- The Dog Pillow, an Edo period parody of The Pillow Book
- The Tale of Genji, a novel contemporaneous to The Pillow Book
- Murasaki Shikibu
