= The Dog Pillow =

Early-Edo period Japanese literature

Inu makura or The Dog Pillow (犬枕) is an early-Edo period Japanese literary parody of The Pillow Book of Sei Shōnagon. The title has also been translated as The Mongrel Pillow.

== The Pillow Book ==
Sei Shōnagon's observations of the Heian court at the end of the tenth-century in The Pillow Book (枕草子, Makura no sōshi) include passages that resemble a poetic diary, others in an essay-like style, as well as a number of poetic catalogues or "detailing of things" (ものはつくし). For instance, under the heading Elegant Things: 'a white coat worn over a violet waistcoat, duck eggs, shaved ice mixed with liana syrup placed in a new silver bowl, rock-crystal prayer beads, wisteria blossoms, plum blossoms covered with snow, a beautiful child eating strawberries'.

Inu makura similarly comprises a number of such listings under a series of headings, although without the narrative accompaniment. Combined with the work's brevity, the effect is sustained through 'the possibilities of terseness, juxtaposition, and surprise', by repeating the same situation under a different heading, or by the subtle alteration of a situation. There are in total ninety sections, seventeen of them in the form of kyōka or 'comic waka'. The work, without colophon or title page, and dated variously between 1596 and 1607, is attributed to Hata Sōha (1550–1607), annotator of Essays in Idleness, physician to Toyotomi Hidetsugu, storyteller (otogishu) to Toyotomi Hideyoshi, and later in the employ of Tokugawa Ieyasu. An early exemplar of kanazōshi or 'booklets in the vernacular', it was printed with wooden movable type.

Illustrative of the work are such sections as Things One Wishes to See: 'the moon, well-performed Noh, the furnishings of a tea house, the real thoughts of one's lover'; Interesting Things: 'Tsurezuregusa, arranging coals for the tea ceremony, a flower-viewing walk with a boy favourite'; and Things that Stand One's Hair on End: 'putting on armour in winter without underclothes'.

== Parodies ==
Such parodies were amongst the earliest genres of kanazōshi, updating and transforming Heian and later court works into "comic versions of contemporary popular culture". In the 1530s, Dog Tsukubashū (犬筑波集), attributed to Yamazaki Sōkan and a response to the first collections of linked verse, had been infused with the haikai spirit, "outlandish metaphor", and "irreverent or ribald humour". Following on from Inu makura, other parodies emerged: the Fake Tales of Ise (偽物語, Nise Monogatari) of 1640; Dog Tsurezuregusa (犬徒然草) of 1653; and Dog Hyakunin Isshū (犬百人一首) of 1669.

== See also ==
- Japanese literature
- Japanese poetry
- The Lady who Loved Insects
- List of National Treasures of Japan (writings: Japanese books)
