= Chiteiki =

Chiteiki (池亭記) is a classic work of Japanese non-fiction literature written during the late tenth century by Yoshishige no Yasutane 慶滋保胤 (c. 933 – 1002). Composed in Sino-Japanese (漢文, kanbun), Chiteiki is considered a foundational example of recluse writing known as "thatched-hut literature" (草庵文学, sōan bungaku). The style belongs to a genre called zuihitsu (随筆), which might be compared to the writing style of a diary or modern blog for its loosely connected, "train of thought" character.

Chiteiki recapitulates conventional Chinese-Confucian narratives about the scholar-official who longs for a life of solitude away from the duty and dross of the city. Although the prose bears the imprints of Chinese antecedents, the aesthetics of Chiteiki are unmistakably Japanese. Indeed, the work establishes a set of domestic tropes related to renunciation that permeates later Japanese writings. Chief among them is the house, which stands as a metaphor for worldly attachment. The title of Yasutane's work itself, Chiteiki, means "records of a pond pavilion." By narrating the construction of what to him was a simple dwelling and recognizing the folly of his fixation on it, Yasutane placed the house at the center of future discourses on solitude.

For all its literary value, Chiteiki also enjoys a high profile as a historical source. In fact, the first one-third of the text is a remarkably accurate account of the tectonic changes that were transforming Kyoto's urban landscape during the late tenth century. It explains how the master-planned city, established in 794 and modeled on the great Chinese capitals of Luoyang and Chang'an, had begun to disintegrate. By Yasutane's time, the entire western half of the urban grid had become virtually abandoned while the population clustered with stifling and dangerous density in the northeast. He laments how development beyond the capital's north and eastern boundaries degraded the natural environment and exacerbated the perennial danger of floods.

== The Author ==
Yoshishige no Yasutane was born in about 933 to the respected Kamo 加茂 family of yin/yang divination practitioners in the imperial capital of Kyoto. Early success in historical and literary studies may have contributed to Yasutane's ambition to establish a new and distinct aristocratic lineage, which explains why he changed his family name from Kamo to Yoshishige. Despite possessing obvious talent and having trained under celebrated teachers of the day, Yasutane ended up having an unremarkable career as a journeyman official within the imperial bureaucracy. He rose only to the middling status of junior sixth rank, and the highest official post he occupied was that of imperial records keeper (内記, naiki). "Although my rank is low," Yasutane tells us in Chiteiki, "my position earns me respect." It did not, however, earn him much money. By his own account, it was a lack of funds that inspired him to move away from the capital's elite northern district to build a "pond pavilion", a chitei (池亭) in the more humble Rokujō (六条) area in the city's south.

== Background and Influences ==
Yasutane drew inspiration for his text from Bai Juyi's Record of the Thatched Hall on Mt. Lu Chi Shang Pian (池上篇) and Kane Akira's book by the same title. The short text is contained with volume 12 of the Honchō Monzui. It is composed of two major sections. The first is a commentary on problems within the society. Chiteiki is primarily cited as having a major influence on Kamo no Chōmei's later Hōjōki (written around 1212). In Hōjōki, Chōmei mimics a number of literary devices found in Chiteiki, describes similar social problems, and eventually goes into seclusion building a small hut.

== See also ==
- Hōjōki
