= George Sansom =

British diplomat and historian

Sir George Sansom GBE KCMG
- Born: 28 November 1883; London, England
- Died: 8 March 1965 (aged 81); Tucson, Arizona, United States
- Occupations: Diplomat, Japanologist, educator

Sir George Bailey Sansom GBE KCMG (28 November 1883 – 8 March 1965) was a British diplomat and historian of pre-modern Japan, particularly noted for his historical surveys and his attention to Japanese society and culture.

== Early life ==
Sansom was born in London, where his father worked as a naval architect, but was educated in France and Germany, attending both the University of Giessen and the University of Marburg. In September 1903, he passed the examination for the Diplomatic Service.

== Diplomatic service ==
Sansom first arrived in Japan in 1904 and was attached to the British legation in Tokyo to learn the Japanese language. While he was working as private secretary to Sir Claude Maxwell MacDonald, the legation gained higher status by becoming an embassy, and Sansom was present during the negotiations for the renewal of the Anglo-Japanese Alliance in 1905. He spent the majority of his diplomatic career in Japan, working in consulates all over the country while also picking up the language.

Sansom began his literary career in 1911 with a translation of the Tsurezuregusa by Yoshida Kenkō, a major text of the Kamakura period.

Sansom was on leave in London in 1915, but was declared unfit for military service in the First World War. He was assigned by the Foreign Office to the War Office to undertake political espionage and was sent to Archangel in Russia. He was married the following year.

Sansom returned to Japan in January 1920 as Secretary to Sir Charles Eliot, whose interest in Japanese Buddhism spurred Sansom's interest in Japanese history and culture. He was thus encouraged to follow in the footsteps of his scholarly predecessors among British diplomats in Japan, such as Ernest Mason Satow, William George Aston and John Harington Gubbins. The position also gave Sansom access to many Japanese scholars as well as political leaders.

Sansom was promoted to Commercial Secretary in 1923. In 1926, Sansom was awarded the CMG (Companion of the Order of St. Michael and St. George). He was divorced in June 1927, but remarried at the end of May the following year.

Also in 1928, Sansom published A Historical Grammar of Japanese. He followed this in 1931 with Japan: A Short Cultural History and in 1935 with a new edition of Sir Charles Eliot's Japanese Buddhism, which had been left incomplete at the time of Eliot's death.

In January 1930, Sansom was promoted to Commercial Counsellor, in charge of improving trade relations. He visited the Philippines in 1932. In 1933, Sir Francis Oswald Lindley assigned him the task of negotiating a commercial treaty between British India and Japan. Sansom was made a member of the Japan Academy in 1934, and in 1935, he was promoted to Knight Commander within the Order of St. Michael and St. George.

As relations between Britain and Japan continued to deteriorate, Sansom's reputation as a Japanophile came to be perceived as a liability. Although the Ambassador, Sir Robert Clive, continued to rely on Sansom, his successor from 1937, Robert Craigie, was less receptive to his advice. In 1935, Sansom took a leave of absence of six months, which he spent at Columbia University in New York as a lecturer. While he was on leave in London, he announced his retirement from the Diplomatic Service with effect from September 1940. He agreed to return to Japan for one more mission before taking up a position waiting for him at Columbia University.

== Wartime service ==
Following the outbreak of the Second World War, Sansom was sent to Washington, D.C., and then to Singapore, speaking to leading officials in the Royal Navy as an adviser on economic warfare. He was later appointed as a civilian representative on the Far East War Council. Evacuated to Java after the fall of Singapore, he was attached to the headquarters of General Archibald Wavell, but after the fall of Java to the Japanese Sansom was evacuated to Australia, and from there back to Washington, D.C., where he remained until the end of the war as a Minister Plenipotentiary attached to the British Embassy.

== Post-war career ==
Sansom was the British representative on the Far Eastern Commission, which formally oversaw the Allied Occupation of Japan. He revisited Japan in 1946.

Sansom retired in 1947 and was awarded the Knight Grand Cross of the Order of the British Empire. From then until 1953, he was a professor of Japanese studies at Columbia University and also became the first Director of the East Asia Institute. He published The Western World and Japan: A Study in the Interaction of European and Asiatic Cultures in 1949, and visited Japan in 1950 to give a series of lectures.

In 1955, Sansom retired to Palo Alto, California, home of Stanford University. Stanford University Press, which had published his Japan: A Short Cultural History in 1931, and also published A History of Japan in three volumes between 1958 and 1963. He was made an honorary fellow of the Japan Academy in 1951.

Sansom died on 8 March 1965 while on a visit to Tucson, Arizona. His second wife, Katherine Sansom, herself an author on Japanese topics, published a memoir consisting primarily of Sansom's letters and papers, and her remembrances.

== Works ==
- Sansom, George Bailey. (1911). The Tsuredzure Gusa of Yoshida No Kaneyoshi, Being the Meditations of a Recluse in the 14th Century.
- _________. (1928). An Historical Grammar of Japanese. Oxford: Oxford University Press.
  - 1946—2nd edition by Oxford University Press, Oxford.
  - 1968—reprinted by Clarendon Press, Oxford. ASIN: B0007ITUYC
  - 1995—reprinted by RoutledgeCurzon, London. ISBN 978-0-7007-0288-6 (cloth)
- _________. (1931). Japan: A Short Cultural History. London: Cresset Press, 1931, and New York: D. Appleton, 1931.
- _________. (1933). Trade Conditions in the Philippine Islands. ASIN B0008D0H5W
- _________. (1942). Postwar Relations with Japan. (Secretariat paper) ASIN B0007ETL9K
- _________. (1949). The Western World and Japan: A Study in the Interaction of European and Asiatic Cultures. New York: Random House. ISBN 978-0-394-45150-3
  - 1973—reprinted Vintage Books, New York. ISBN 978-0-394-71867-5
- _________. (1952). Japan: A Short Cultural History. Stanford: Stanford University Press. ISBN 978-0-8047-0952-1 (cloth) ISBN 978-0-8047-0954-5 (paper)
- _________. (1958). A History of Japan to 1334. Stanford: Stanford University Press. ISBN 978-0-8047-0523-3; OCLC 224793047
- _________. (1961). A History of Japan: 1334–1615. Stanford: Stanford University Press. ISBN 978-0-8047-0525-7; OCLC 43483194
- _________. (1963). A History of Japan, 1615–1867. Stanford: Stanford University Press. ISBN 978-0-8047-0527-1; OCLC 173092834
- _________. (1984). Japan in World History. Tokyo: Tuttle Publishing. ISBN 4-8053-0432-4; ASIN B0007IZ02I (cloth) [reprinted 1986. ISBN 978-0-8048-1510-9 (paper)]
- _________. (19__). The Reminiscences of Sir George Sansom. ASIN B0007J22K0
