= Tsurezuregusa =

1330–1332 essay collection by Kenkō

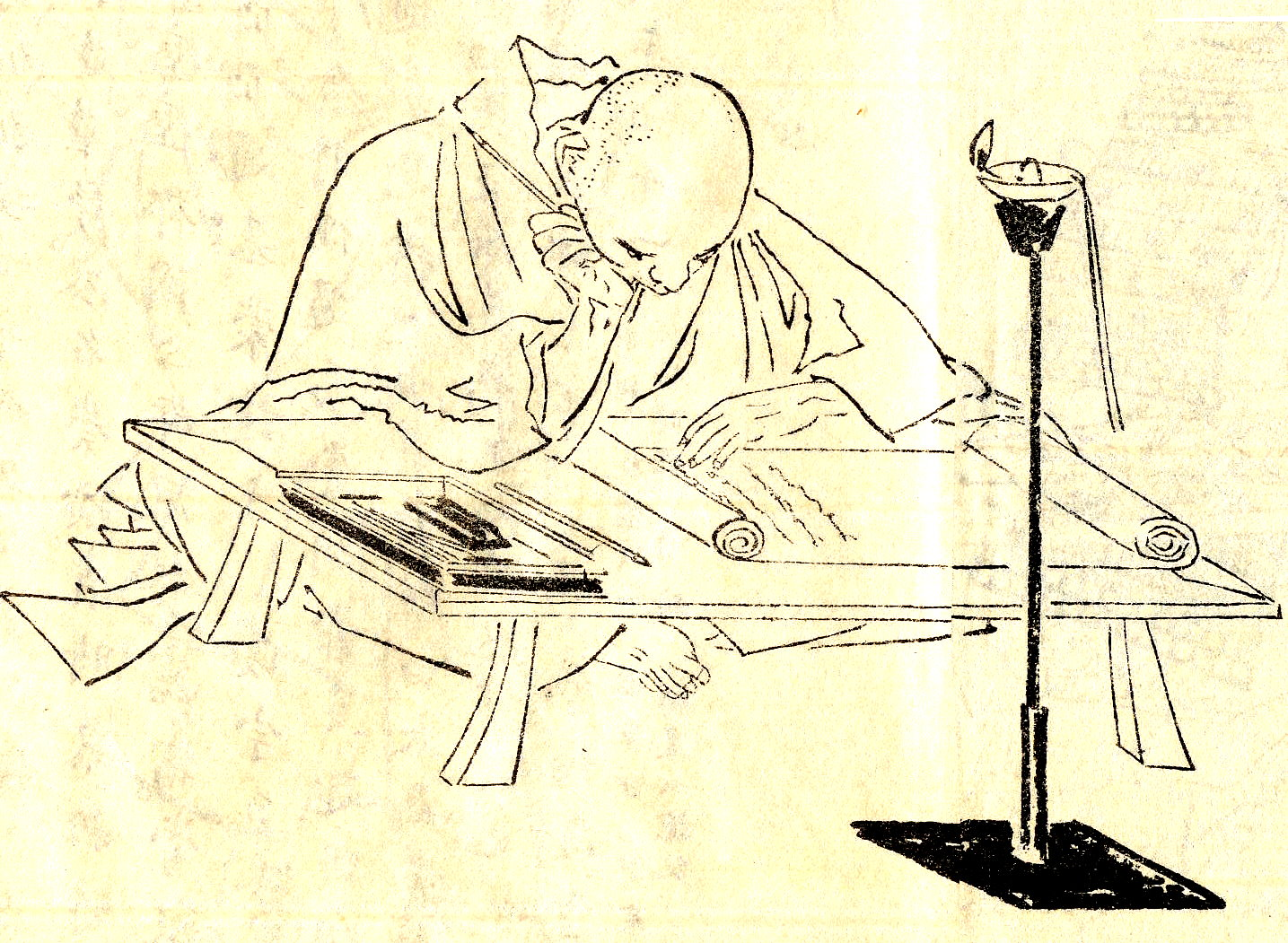
Kenkō

Tsurezuregusa (徒然草; Japanese pronunciation: [tsɯ.ɾe.(d)zɯ.ɾeꜜ.ɡɯ.sa, -ŋɯ.sa]) is a collection of essays written by the Japanese monk Kenkō (兼好) between 1330 and 1332. The work is widely considered a gem of medieval Japanese literature and one of the three representative works of the zuihitsu genre, along with The Pillow Book and the Hōjōki.

== Structure and content ==
Essays in Idleness comprises a preface and 243 passages, varying in length from a single line to a few pages. Kenkō, a Buddhist monk, writes about Buddhist truths, and themes such as death and impermanence prevail in the work, although it also contains passages devoted to the beauty of nature as well as some accounts of humorous incidents. The original work was not divided or numbered; the division dates to the 17th century.

The work takes its title from its prefatory passage:

What a strange, demented feeling it gives me when I realize I have spent whole days before this inkstone, with nothing better to do, jotting down at random whatever nonsensical thoughts that have entered my head.

The poet Shōtetsu, who lived a hundred years after Kenkō, noted that Essays in Idleness resembled Sei Shōnagon's The Pillow Book in form, being composed of anecdotes, reminiscences, and Buddhist homilies. Another influence on Kenkō was the eremitic tradition exemplified in Kamo no Chōmei's Ten-foot Square Hut.

== Mystery of its origins ==
Kenkō's work has been held in high regard and considered a classic in Japan since the 17th century, but little is known of its composition and publication, and they remain matters of speculation. One of the most popular beliefs about it was first articulated by Sanjonishi Sane'eda (1511-1579), who stated that Kenkō did not edit the 243 sections of his work but rather wrote his thoughts on scraps of paper, which he then pasted onto the walls of his cottage. It has been hypothesized that Imagawa Sadayo, called Ryōshun, a friend of Kenkō who was a poet and a general, compiled these scraps into a book. Combining them with other essays of Kenkō's found in the possession of Kenkō's former servant, he arranged the material in the order in which they are found today. The oldest surviving text of Tsurezuregusa has come down to us from Ryōshun's disciple Shōtetsu, a fact that appears to support Sanjonishi's account. However, most modern scholars have rejected this account, being skeptical of the possibility that any individual other than Kenkō himself could have assembled the book.

== Theme of impermanence ==
Throughout Essays in Idleness, a consistent theme regarding the impermanence of life is noted in general as a significant principle in Kenkō's work. This concept is included throughout Tsurezuregusa as a whole, making it a highly relatable work to many as it touches on the secular side among the overtly Buddhist beliefs mentioned in some chapters of the work.

Kenkō relates the impermanence of life to the beauty of nature in an insightful manner. Kenkō sees the aesthetics of beauty in a different light: the beauty of nature lies in its impermanence. Within his work, Kenkō quotes the poet Ton’a:“It is only after the silk wrapper has frayed at top and bottom, and the mother-of-pearl has fallen from the roller, that a scroll looks beautiful.”

In agreement with this statement, Kenkō shows his support for an appreciation for the uncertain nature of things, and proposes the idea of how nothing lasts forever is a motivation for appreciation of what one has. Kenkō himself states this in a similar manner in his work:

“If man were never to fade away like the dews of Adashino, never to vanish like the smoke over Toribeyama, but lingered on forever in this world, how things would lose their power to move us!”

Kenkō clearly states his point of view regarding the nature of things in life, and regards the perishability of objects to be moving. In relation to the concept of impermanence, his works links to the fondness of the irregular and incomplete, and the beginnings and ends of things. Kenkō states:

“It is typical of the unintelligent man to insist on assembling complete sets of everything. Imperfect sets are better.”

Within his work, Kenkō shows the relation of impermanence to the balance of things in life. Beginnings and ends relate to the impermanence of things, and it is because of impermanence that beginnings and ends are interesting and should be valued. Irregularity and incompleteness of collections and works show the potential for growth and improvement, and the impermanence of its state provides a moving framework towards appreciation towards life. Kenkō notes, “Branches about to blossom or gardens strewn with faded flowers are worthier of our admiration. In all things, it is the beginnings and ends that are interesting.”

Kenkō's work predominantly reveals these themes, providing his thoughts set out in short essays of work. Although his concept of impermanence is based upon his personal beliefs, these themes provide a basic concept relatable among many, making it an important classical literature resonating throughout Japanese high school curriculum today.

== Translation history ==
An English translation is by Donald Keene (1967). In his preface, Keene states that, of the six or so earlier translations into English and German, that by George Sansom is the most distinguished. It was published by the Asiatic Society of Japan in 1911 as The Tsuredzure Gusa of Yoshida No Kaneyoshi: Being the Meditations of a Recluse in the 14th Century.

== Translations ==
- Keene, Donald, tr. (1998). Essays in Idleness: The Tsurezuregusa of Kenkō. New York: Columbia University Press. ISBN 978-0231112550.
- McKinney, Meredith, tr. (2013). Essays in Idleness and Hojoki. London: Penguin. ISBN 978-0141192109
- Sansom, G. B., tr. (1998). Essays in Idleness: The Tsurezure Gusa of Yoshida Kenko. Noel Pinnington, ed. Stansted: Wordsworth Editions. ISBN 978-1853267888.
