= Hateful Things =

Hateful Things (にくきもの, Nikuki mono), also known as Infuriating Things, is a section of The Pillow Book by Sei Shōnagon, a Japanese author and courtier of the Middle Heian period around 1000 AD.

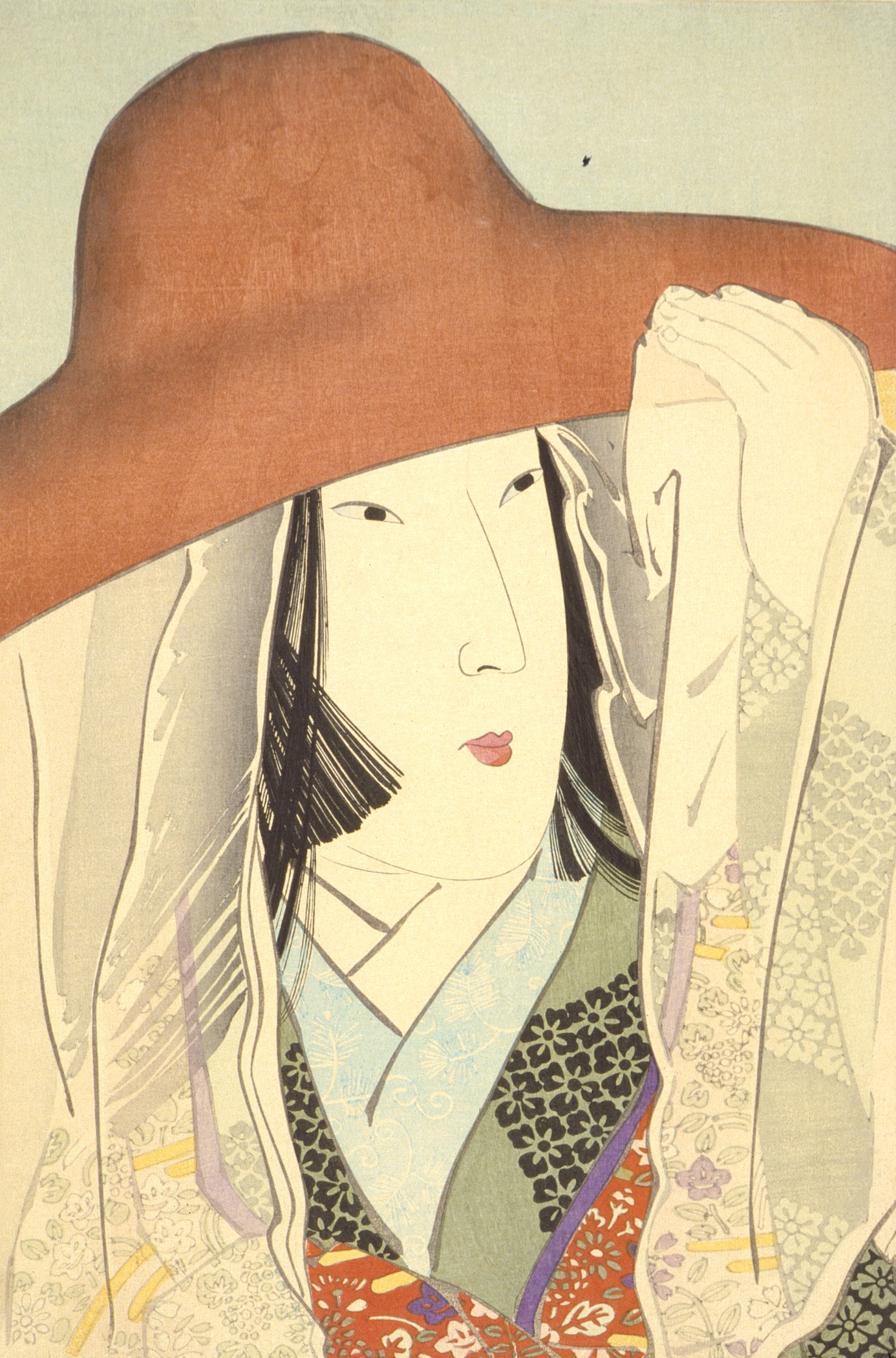
Lady Sei Shonagon, woodblock print by Kobayashi Kiyochika, 1896

== Form ==
Hateful Things was written in the form of a list of the author's dislikes. This short essay is an example of her preference for a list-based style of writing. She lists her hates within topics such as etiquette, women, men, and society. Sei slowly begins by explaining some habits she feels are intolerable that are practiced by others. She uses a comical sense in some of her points giving it a twist to what a simple list can be. At the end of the short essay we can understand that everything bothers her. The author uses hyperbole to illustrate her hates. Shonagon's tone throughout her listing is frank and critical. She writes openly about sensitive subjects: for example, one of her topics is the boorish behavior of men having affairs. She starts by stating the issue, then illustrates with an example of the issue.

== Theme ==
This short essay was written to express Sei Shōnagon's own dislikes. She focuses on topics such as respect, the poor, children, and parenting. She criticizes practices of her time and place to inform the reader what others may think when they fall into her categories. Her purpose of writing this list is to entertain the reader with a comical view on a need for change. Sei writes with a cautious tone of dreaming of change within society. She describes the way Japanese society functioned and her opinion towards it.

== Culture and time period ==
Sei Shōnagon was a Japanese lady in the court of Empress Consort Teishi (定子) during the tenth century. Her exact birth dates are unknown. She lived during the Heian era, when there was much literary activity, and she found herself in rivalry with the novelist Lady Murasaki. Sei was an outstanding and independent woman, who used her skills to be outspoken and wrote Hateful Things with no filters. During this time-period she also wrote several other pieces to express her opinions in a similar form to Hateful Things, including Depressing Things and Elegant Things. This short essay is part of her famous piece The Pillow Book, a meditation on her personal beliefs about social life.

== Imitations ==
Modern-day literature students sometimes choose or are tasked to imitate the form of Hateful Things.
