= Recluse literature =

Japanese literary movement

Recluse literature refers to a Japanese literary movement that rose to its peak in the late Heian period.

== History ==
The origins of the literary style known as Recluse Literature has roots in the Taoist movement in China, said to date back to the 3rd or 4th century BCE. Like the recluses of Japan, Taoist philosophers such as Zhuangzi and Laozi advocated a casting off of the bonds of society and government, and instead living a life free of obligations and the pressures of urban life. The first Japanese recluse is considered to be Saigyō Hōshi, who worked as a guard to retired Emperor Toba until the age of 22, at which time for reasons unknown he took the vows of a monk and proceeded to live alone for long periods of time. Following the relocation of the capital from Heian (present day Kyoto) to Kamakura, located 50 km south-south-west of Tokyo, many court aristocrats, due mainly to the influence of Jōdo shū or Pure Land Buddhism, became disillusioned with the standards and practices of government and everyday life, and instead chose to live on the outskirts of civilization in isolation. The practice of taking the tonsure (becoming a monk) after life in the Imperial court was not entirely new to Japan, but the concept of doing so and completely retreating from secular life into nature, as opposed to the many Buddhist monasteries around the capital, was considered a novel alternative to these newly disillusioned intellectuals. From this isolation, it was common practice for the recluse to focus his efforts on self-reflection, expressed through the arts such as poetry or the writing of zuihitsu-styled essays.

== Extent of isolation ==
While it was ultimately the goal of these disillusioned intellectuals to free themselves from the constraints of society, it was common for many to maintain ties with their closer friends who remained in the city and to occasionally spend time with others. Yoshida Kenkō, a famous Japanese recluse and author of Essays in Idleness was known to maintain very close ties with members of the Ashikaga shogunate, suspending his isolation from time to time in order to visit such members in the capital. Kamo no Chomei, in his essay An Account of My Hut, mentions spending time with a young child while living in isolation. While it was not necessarily the intent of these recluses to live their life entirely without human contact, the isolation of said individuals was not, in fact, complete.

== Notable recluses ==
- Saigyō Hōshi (1118–1190)
- Kamo no Chōmei (1155–1216)
- Yoshida Kenkō (1283–1350)

== Sources ==
- 1. CiNii, https://ci.nii.ac.jp/naid/110005051299/en/
- 2. About Saigyō Hōshi, 2001 Waga, http://www.temcauley.staff.shef.ac.uk/saigyo.shtml
- 3. About Kamo no Chōmei, http://www.humanistictexts.org/kamo.htm
