= Recluse =

Person who lives in voluntary seclusion from the public and society

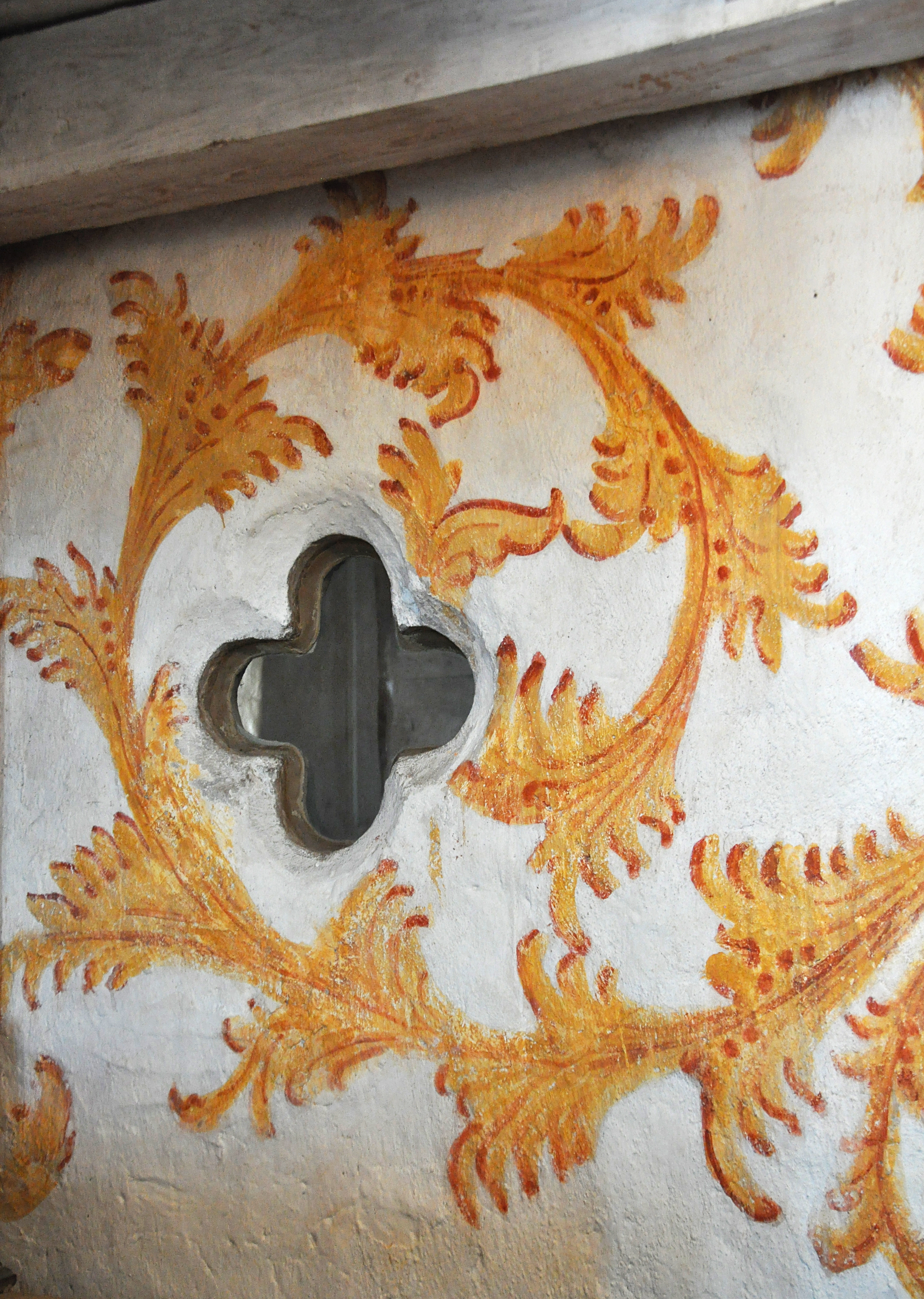
Cell of a recluse with hagioscope in Bro Church, Gotland, Sweden

A recluse is a person who lives in voluntary seclusion and solitude. The word is from the Latin recludere which means 'to open' or 'disclose'.

== Description ==
=== Christian tradition ===
Examples of Christian recluses are Symeon of Trier, who lived within the great Roman Porta Nigra with permission from the Archbishop of Trier, or Theophan the Recluse, a 19th-century monk in the Russian Orthodox Church who was later venerated as a saint. Many celebrated figures of Christian history have spent significant portions of their lives as recluses.

In the Eastern Orthodox, Eastern Lutheran and Eastern Catholic traditions of Christianity, a poustinik is a temporary hermit who has been called to pray and fast alone in a cabin for at least 24 hours.

=== Reclusion in China ===
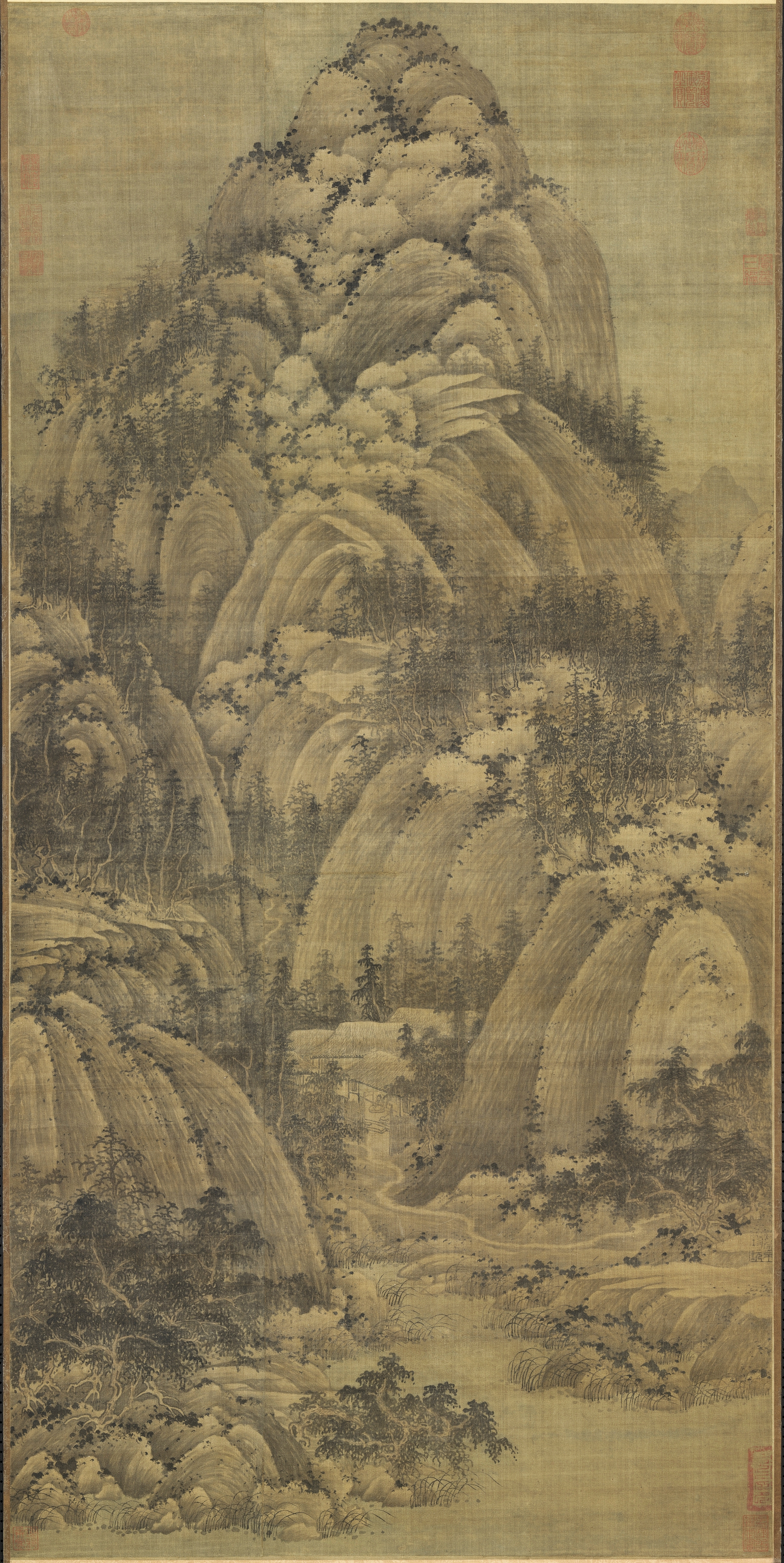
Juran 巨然 (10^{th} century), Seeking the Dao in Autumn Mountains 秋山问道图, hanging scroll, ink and light colors on silk, 165.2 x 77.2 cm. National Palace Museum, Taiwan.

In premodern China, reclusion served as a longstanding and respected tradition, in which individuals withdrew from worldly affairs to live in seclusion, often to pursue Confucian self-cultivation, Daoist immortality, Buddhist enlightenment, or to enjoy a simpler rustic life in rural or mountainous locales. The Confucian tradition espoused reclusion as an alternative path to government service, either because it would be immoral or improper to serve a particular emperor or state, or because one "had not met with their time" (Chinese: 不遇时, romanized: bu yu shi)—meaning that a talented individual was unlucky and unable to realize their ambitions to serve in office. However, recluses could also choose to seclude themselves for a wide variety of reasons, including an indifference toward society, the pursuit of contentment, the preservation of personal integrity, or the avoidance of harm. Reclusion could even be associated with a state of mind, which did not require complete seclusion from society. The arts provided an important means for individuals to pursue this kind of reclusion; for example, viewers of landscape paintings could take a break from their urban lives by imagining themselves as recluses wandering through nature.

Educated, cultured individuals who chose to seclude themselves were called "recluses" (隐士, yinshi, 'hidden gentlemen'); this social role was already established in the time of Confucius (c. 551 – c. 479 BCE), with several recluses appearing in The Analects. Over time, the tradition grew in complexity and sophistication, as stories of renowned recluses served as inspirations and blueprints for future generations. For example, fishing became commonly associated with reclusion in part through the story of Jiang Ziya (姜子牙; fl. 12th century – 11th century BCE), who fished without a hook while waiting to be recognized by the ruler. The Seven Sages of the Bamboo Grove popularized the enjoyment of alcohol and high arts like poetry and playing the guqin as recluse activities. Tao Yuanming (陶淵明; 365–427) was associated with farming in reclusion after his retirement from office, and his name became a common reference for later recluses farming or gardening for pleasure or for sustenance.

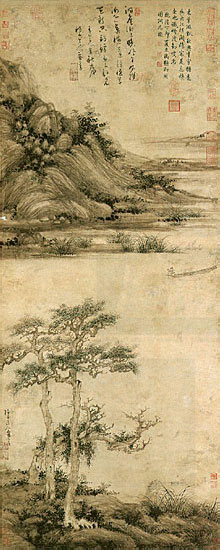
Wu Zhen 吴镇 (1280-1354), Fisherman Recluse on Lake Dongting 洞庭漁隐, ink on paper, 59 x 147cm. National Palace Museum, Taiwan.

In subsequent centuries, the "recluse" became an increasingly rich and varied social category. It was adopted as an affectation by wealthy and powerful officials; it became a meaningful alternative lifestyle for civil officials after their retirement or demotion to rural regions; it served as a way for impoverished individuals who fished or farmed for sustenance to distinguish themselves from common farmers or fishers. This not only allowed these recluses to retain social esteem and acceptance as respectable individuals, but also sometimes served as an alternative path to officialdom, as imperial edicts sometimes asked local officials to recommend recluses to the court.

Although reclusion was largely a phenomenon of premodern China, it has continued in the modern world, as individuals pursuing Daoist cultivation and Buddhist enlightenment still seclude themselves in the Zhongnan Mountains.

== See also ==
- Anchorite
- Recluse literature
