= Hōjōki =

Short work of the Kamakura period by Kamo no Chōmei

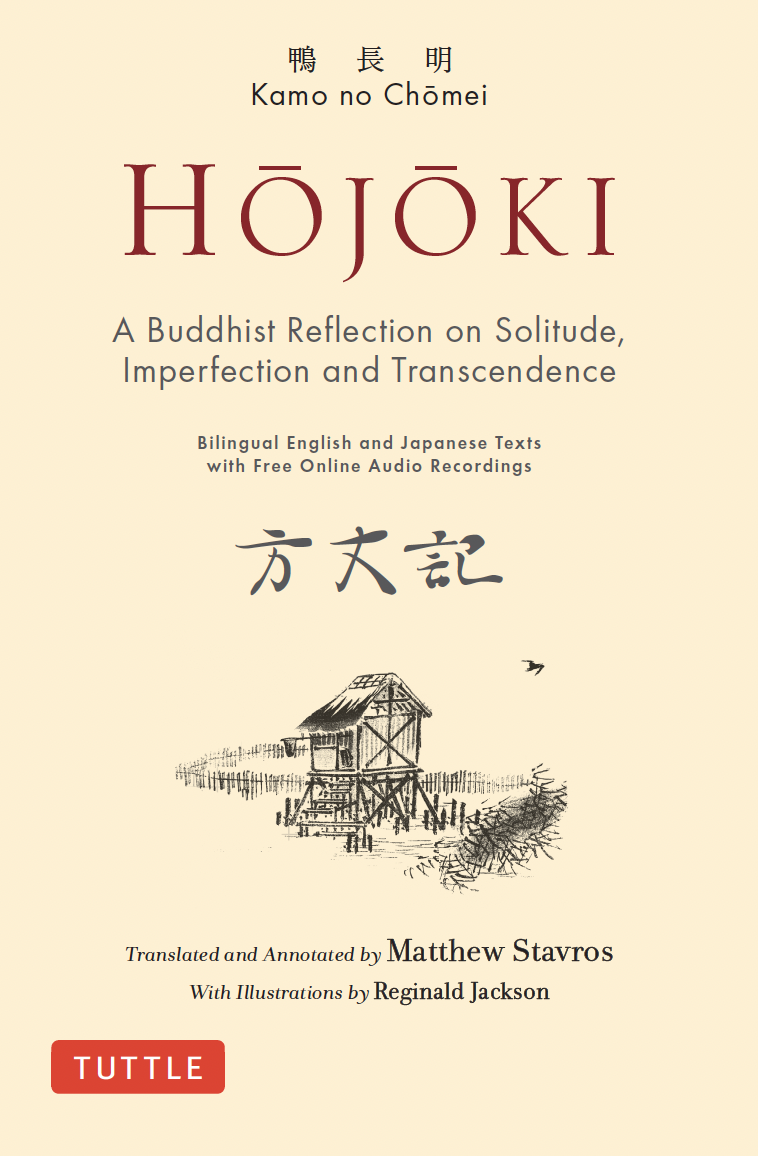
- Book cover of a modern translation of Hōjōki
- Author: Kamo no Chōmei
- Language: Japanese
- Genre: Recluse literature, zuihitsu
- Published: 1212

Hōjōki (方丈記; literally "square-jō record"), variously translated as An Account of My Hut or The Ten Foot Square Hut, is an important and popular short work of the early Kamakura period (1185–1333) in Japan by Kamo no Chōmei. Written in March 1212, the work depicts the Buddhist concept of impermanence (mujō) through the description of various disasters such as earthquake, famine, whirlwind and conflagration that befall the people of the capital city Kyoto. The author Chōmei, who in his early career worked as court poet and was also an accomplished player of the biwa and koto, became a renunciant in his fifties and moved farther and farther into the mountains, eventually living in a 10-foot square hut located at Mt. Hino. The work has been classified both as belonging to the zuihitsu genre and as Buddhist literature. Now considered as a Japanese literary classic, the work remains part of the Japanese school curriculum.

The opening sentence of Hōjōki is famous in Japanese literature as an expression of mujō, the transience of things:

The flow of the river never ceases,
And the water never stays the same.
Bubbles float on the surface of pools,
Bursting, re-forming, never lingering.
They’re like the people in this world and their dwellings.

This invites comparison with the aphorism panta rhei (everything flows) ascribed to Heraclitus, which uses the same image of a changing river, and the Latin adages Omnia mutantur and Tempora mutantur.

The text was heavily influenced by Yoshishige no Yasutane's Chiteiki (982). In addition, Chōmei based his small hut, and much of his philosophical outlook, on the accounts of the Indian sage Vimalakīrti from the Vimalakīrti Sūtra.

== Synopsis ==
Chōmei introduces the essay with analogies emphasizing the impermanence of nature, setting a pessimistic view for the rest of this work. He recalls the devastating fire of the Fourth Month of Angen 3 where homes and governmental buildings "turned to ash and dust". Winds picked up the fire and spread the flames throughout the city. Those who were caught near it choked and collapsed. Others instantly died.

Chōmei goes on to recount a great whirlwind that raged on from Nakanomikado and Kyōgoku to Rokujō during the Fourth Month of Jishō 4. The wind blew on for several blocks. No homes were spared; homes were reduced to posts and beams, and others were flattened. The wind blew items, boards, and shingles from the homes into the sky along with dust that obscured it.

The Sixth Month of Jishō 4 brought on a change of the relocation of Japan's capital from Kyoto to Fukuhara. Although people objected, the emperor, ministers and high officials still moved. Those who depended on the capital left with them while others were left behind. Houses went in to ruin, and plots of land became barren fields. Chōmei takes a chance to visit Fukuhara, in which he sees that the city was too crowded for proper streets and nature always beat Fukuhara with violent winds.

Residents complained about the pain of rebuilding in Fukuhara. Officials who usually wear court robes also wear simple clothes now. The uneasiness of disorder set into the capital, and eventually the fears became true. The capital was moved back to Kyoto. The houses of those who moved were never the same.

In the Yōwa era, there was a two-year famine caused by the onslaught of droughts, typhoons, floods and the fact that grains never ripened for harvest. People abandoned their land; some moved to the mountains. Buddhist prayers and rites were performed to remedy the situations but to no effect. Beggars began to fill the streets, and the famine became an epidemic in the second year. Bodies of those who starved lined the streets with almost no passage for horses and carriages. Some tore down their houses for simple resources to sell for spare change; others went to the extent of stealing Buddhist images and temple furnishings to sell. Chōmei reveals that he was born in this age, and he recounts that one of the saddest occurrences is when loved ones died first by starving to feed their family or lovers. Chōmei also gruesomely describes, "I also saw a small child who, not knowing that his mother was dead, lay beside her, sucking at her breast."

The Shingon priest Ryugo of Ninna Temple grievingly marked the first letter of the Siddhaṃ script on the foreheads of the dead to link them to the Buddha. He counted their bodies lining from Ichijō of the north to Kujō of the south and Kyōgoku of the east to Suzaku of the west totaling in 42,300 Corpses, although there were more.

A devastating earthquake occurred, causing the mountains to crumble, water to flow onto land, and shrines to be destroyed. The earthquake was so dangerous that people's homes could be crushed at any moment. After the earthquake subsided, a period of aftershocks lasting 3 months ensued. This was during the Saiko era (around 855), when many significant events occurred: the great earthquake, and the head falling from the Buddha at Tōdai Temple.

Chōmei describes the dissatisfaction experienced by people of lower rank regarding their status: they endure cruel hardships and are never able to find peace. Chōmei also shares his experiences during this time period. He inherited his paternal grandmother's house and lived there for some time. Then, when he lost his father, he could no longer live in the house, because it reminded him of past memories. Since then, he has built a house solely for himself, constructed of earth and bamboo posts. During periods of snowfall and wind, his house would be at great risk of collapsing. At the age of 50, Chōmei left his home and withdrew from the world. He was unmarried and had no children, nor did he have relatives difficult to leave behind. He was jobless and had no income. Chōmei spent five years living on Mount Ohara. When Chōmei reached the age of 60, he decided to build another house that would last him until the end of his life. This house was significantly smaller than the others he built: only 10 feet square and 7 feet high. Land is not necessary for him, according to Chōmei, because with a makeshift house, he can easily move it around.

Chōmei describes how he built a water shelf to place offerings on, bamboo shelves with Japanese poetry, and hung a painting of Amitābha. His ten-foot square hut is near the woods in Toyama. His accessibility to the woods makes gathering kindling easier. Chōmei describes a brushwood hut at the base of the mountain that houses the mountain caretaker and a child. Despite a 50-year age difference, he and the boy are great friends. They go on journeys through the mountain together, visit the Ishiyama Hongan Temple, and collect offerings. At night, he gets emotional when thinking of his early life and old friends. Chōmei then tells of how he thought his stay in his ten-foot square hut would be temporary. However, he has lived in it for five years and considers it his home. He knows very little of life in the capital and does not relate to the people there. He lacks ambition and only seeks tranquillity. Chōmei describes the type of people he likes and the way he treats his body. When he feels distressed, he rests his body. When he feels strong, he works it. He is also unaffected by society's standards and is not embarrassed by his appearance. Chōmei then goes on to say, "The Three Worlds exist in only one mind." This is based on Buddhist beliefs of three worlds: the world of desire, the world of form, and the world of formlessness.

== Context ==
=== Transition from the Heian classical period to medieval Japan ===
Kamo no Chōmei experienced the change of the aristocratic Heian period to the tumultuous shōgunate of the Kamakura period at the age of thirty. Military rulers seized power, creating feudal Japan. During this era, the influence of Buddhism declined significantly. Cyclic cosmology foretold of its decline, in which aristocrats enacted the move from city life to reclusion in nature for Buddhist pursuits. This impacted Chōmei's decision to a simpler and more devoted existence. As the overpowering rule continues, there is also a transition from optimistic Buddhism to pessimistic Buddhism. This can be seen in Chōmei's work: "All human endeavors are foolish, but among them, spending one’s fortune and troubling one’s mind to build a house in such a dangerous capital is particularly vain." Here, Chōmei expresses his feelings not only on human motives, but also immediately assumes the worst in living at the capital. In context, Chōmei refers to the great fire that destroyed nearly all houses in Kyoto. From this one experience, he advises others that investing in a residence in a capital is irrational. Another example of Chōmei's pessimistic philosophy is here:

The powerful man is consumed by greed; he who stands alone is mocked. Wealth brings many fears poverty brings cruel hardship. Look to another for help and you will belong to him. Take someone under your wing, and your heart will be shackled by affection."

=== Denial of position at Kamo Shrine ===
Chōmei, from a respected lineage of Shinto priests, strove to secure a post at the Kamo shrines, where his family had an established legacy. However, he failed in this endeavor. Chōmei decided to depart for the mountains even after Emperor Go-Toba established an alternate post for him at Kamo Shrine. This significant event prompted his bleak outlook on life and his decision to become a recluse.

== Structure ==
=== Zuihitsu ===
Zuihitsu style is a style of writing in which a person is reacting to his or her surroundings. In Hōjōki, the Zuihitsu style is seen as Chōmei is giving his account of what is happening around him and is contemplating on how others are reacting to certain situations. Zuihitsu writings tend to focus on themes that are reflective of the time period in which they're written in. Chōmei focuses on the theme of dissatisfaction that comes from people of lower rank and the hardships they face because of this.

All in all, life in this world is difficult; the fragility and transience of our bodies and dwellings are indeed as I have said. We cannot reckon the many ways in which we trouble our hearts according to where we live and in obedience to our status.

=== Yūgen ===
In Japanese aesthetics, Yūgen is understood as an exploration of a "mysterious sense of beauty" within the universe and the sad beauty of human suffering. As Chōmei is describing the great earthquake that occurred in his time period, he reveals this sense of beauty in the universe and the sad beauty of human suffering, which can be seen in the quote,

A dreadful earthquake shook the land. The effects were remarkable. Mountains crumbled and dammed the rivers; the sea tilted and inundated the land. The earth split open and water gushed forth…people who were inside their houses might be crushed in a moment.

=== Chinese influences ===
Bo Juyi (772–846) was a renowned Chinese poet and a government official of the Tang dynasty. He was known for writing poetry that focused on his career or observations about his everyday life. Bo Juyi can be seen as an influence for the Hōjōki, since many his works were done in the zuihitsu style, in which Hōjōki is written.

== Themes ==
=== Buddhism ===
==== Impermanence ====
Chōmei immediately begins the work with analogies of a river and a home to show impermanence. He explains, "The current of a flowing river does not cease, and yet the water is not the same water as before. The foam floats on stagnant pools, now vanishing, now forming, never stays the same for long. So, too, it is with the people and dwellings of the world." Throughout the essay, he draws comparisons to highlight the impermanence of life and events. Buddhist influences are inclusive in Chōmei's work. Chōmei understands Buddha's ideology of not becoming attached to material things, but Chōmei believes that what is important is the way in which things are dealt with. The actions that people take or the places they go are not important in life, since nothing truly lasts. This includes buildings, wealth, and homes.

==== Duḥkha ====
Chōmei demonstrates the Buddhist notion of duḥkha (suffering) by consistently focusing on the experiences of suffering. He says, "All in all, life in this world is difficult... We cannot reckon the many ways in which we trouble our hearts according to where we live and in obedience to our status... Wealth brings many fears; poverty brings cruel hardship."

==== Asceticism ====
Significantly, Chōmei's hut, in which this work is named after, is simply a ten-foot square hut. Chōmei illustrates, "In the course of things, years have piled up and my residences have steadily shrunk... In area it is only ten feet square; in height, less than seven feet." He goes on to say, "I lay a foundation, put up a simple makeshift roof, secure each joint with a latch. This is so I can easily move the building if anything dissatisfies me." Chōmei practices in asceticism in which everything he owns is of significance to him, and he values his possessions more.

=== Reclusion ===
Later in Chōmei's life, he moves to the mountains. Living alone significantly impacts Chōmei's life by allowing him to focus on his connection to Amida Buddha. He describes, "Using what comes to hand, I cover my skin with clothing woven from the bark of wisteria vines and with a hempen quilt, and sustain my life with asters of the field and fruit of the trees on the peak. Because I do not mingle with others I am not embarrassed by my appearance..."

== Symbolism ==
=== Nature ===
==== Natural disasters ====
Of all the follies of human endeavor, none is more pointless than expending treasures and spirit to build houses in so dangerous place as the capital.

Chōmei often makes a point that no matter where individuals may be, the world still impacts them. Chōmei believes that the discontent in many people's lives come from the heart and not the environment in which they are in. Because the natural disasters destroy the things people are attached to, people hearts are often disturbed by the loss of their possessions.

=== Homes ===
==== Dwelling ====
Chōmei does not believe in any form of permanent home. Often he refers to the concept of "man" and "dwelling." He believes that a home is symbolic of impermanence. Chōmei did not build his cottage to last. The style in which he built his cottage requires small effort to rebuild. This symbolizes human nature to rebuild even though the feats of their labor would soon be taken away by nature. In essence, Chōmei does not believe any effort is necessary to create something since there is no value in what one builds. Chōmei spent his eremitic life in hermitage. The only way in which he could avoid being trapped by materialistic reasons. He did not spend much effort in the construction of his house in order to be detached from his "dwelling." Chōmei constructed a temporal dwelling in order to distance himself from any fear or regrets.

=== Sphere ===
Chōmei refers to The Sphere as "an environment which leads him to impiousness." The Sphere relies on the human senses to determine it, and it can be different for each individual to define. The Sphere (kyogai) was originally a term that was used in Buddhism, but it was influenced by Japanese culture to involve the environment, circumstances, or surrounding things. Chōmei believes that The Sphere is not impious, but The Sphere itself is the cause of his impiousness.

== Significance in recluse literature ==
In order to understand recluse literature's influence on Asian culture, it must be determined why recluses decide to forsake society and cast off into the wilderness at all. According to Li Chi's "The Changing Concept of the Recluse in Chinese Literature", men had various reasons to go into seclusion. Some believed that in secluding themselves they would find some sort of personal ascension and a better understanding of life, away from the material drives of the world, and even more so after the rise of Buddhism. Others found that seclusion would garner them more attention, status, and material gain, a direct contrast to the idea of personal and/or Buddhist piety. Some men made the transition into the wilderness because their structured life had been so terribly destroyed by natural disasters that they had no other choice but to do so. In the context of Chōmei's pilgrimage, we find Chōmei searching for asylum from the downtrodden society he once lived in, in the unstructured pursuit of Buddhist understanding. Recluses in Asian antiquity were revered for their writing because their works introduced those in society to a point of view not cluttered by the conformed ideals of societal life. Because there were various reasons behind intellectuals retiring into the wilderness, we are left with a wealth of knowledge in various writings from the multitude of intellectuals and transcendentalists that secluded themselves in the wilderness, preserved over the years and translated.

== Manuscripts ==
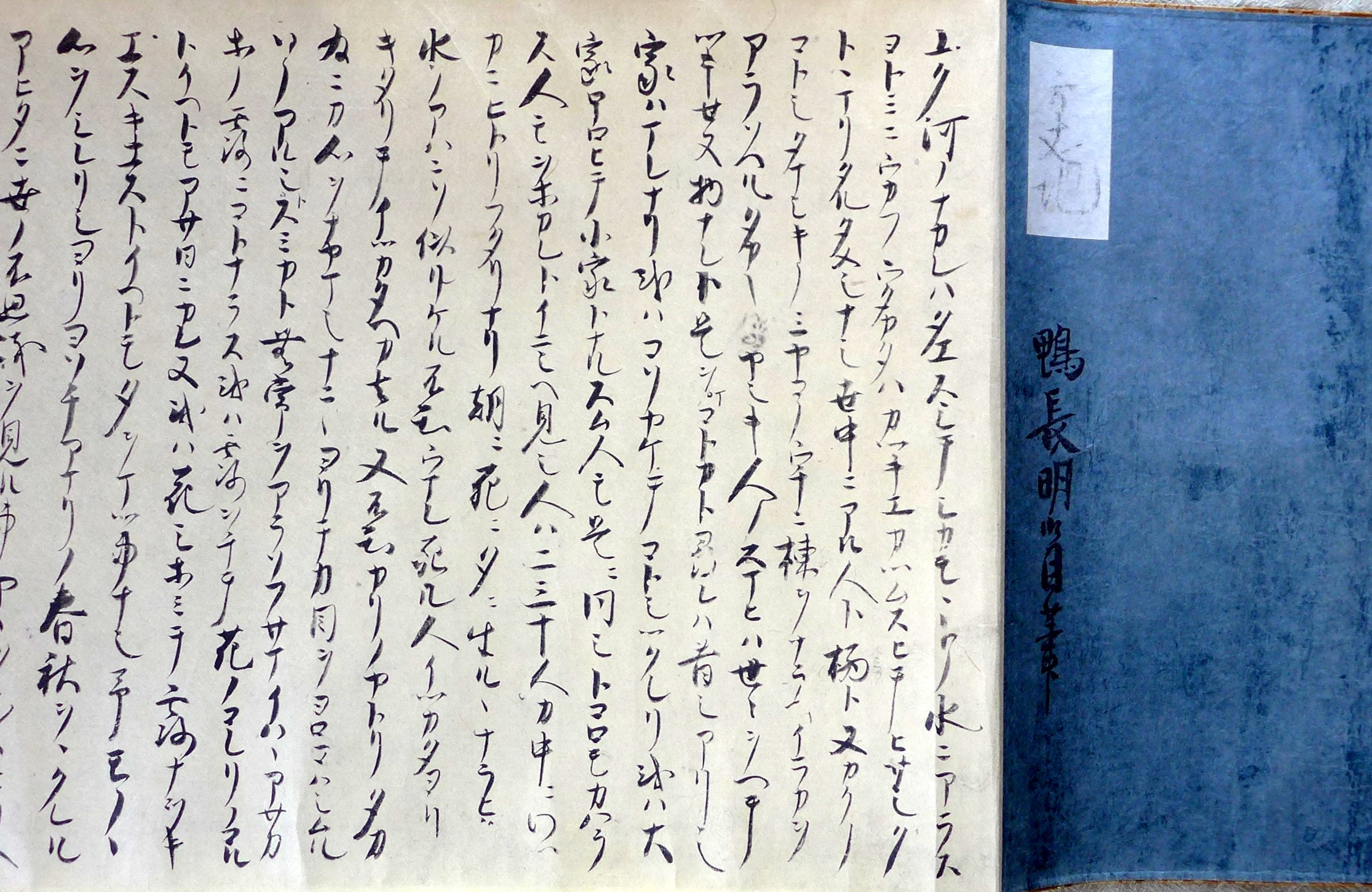
Hōjōki handscroll Daifukukō-ji

Unusually for works of the period, Chōmei's original manuscript survives. Numerous copies have been made and circulated, some complete and some abridged. The complete editions are further categorized into old and popular, while the abridged editions are categorized into Chōkyō, Entoku, and Mana. The Chōkyō and Entoku editions are named after the era date in the afterword and both include extra passages. The Mana editions are written entirely in kanji replacing the kana in the kohon editions.

== Translations ==
Hōjōki is one of the earliest Japanese classical works that was brought to the attention of Western readership, mainly because of its Buddhist elements. The first mention of the work in English language goes as far back as to 1873, when Ernest Mason Satow in an article on Japan briefly mentioned this work while discussing Japanese Literature. However, the first English translation of the work was attempted by Natsume Sōseki in 1891, one of the most prominent Japanese literary figures in modern times. He translated the work into English upon the request of James Main Dixon, his English literature professor at Tokyo Imperial University. Dixon consequently came out with his own translation of the work that was mostly based on Sōseki's translation. Later on William George Aston, Frederick Victor Dickins, Minakata Kumagusu, and many others translated the work into English again. Notable modern translations were prepared by Yasuhiko Moriguchi & David Jenkins (1998), Meredith McKinney (2014), and Matthew Stavros (2020; republished by Tuttle Books in 2024). The work has also been translated into many other foreign languages.

== See also ==
- Chiteiki
- Shimogamo Shrine (a model of the Hut described in Hōjōki is located in Kawai Jinja section of the shrine.)
- Three marks of existence
