= Kiyohara no Fukayabu =

Japanese poet of Heian period

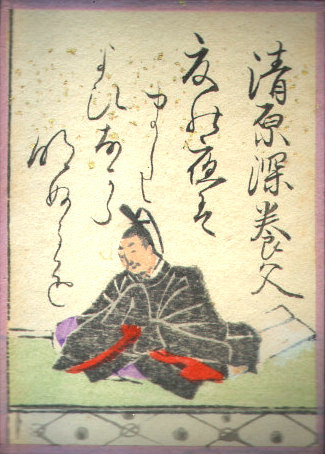
Kiyohara no Fukayabu, from Hyakunin Isshu.

Kiyohara no Fukayabu (清原 深養父, fl.9th/10th Century) was a Japanese poet of Heian period (9-10th century). He is an author of the thirty-sixth poem of the Ogura Hyakunin Isshu and contributor of 17 poems to the Kokin Wakashū.

He is the grandfather of Kiyohara no Motosuke, author of poem 42, and the great-grandfather of Sei Shonagon, author of poem 62 of the Ogura Hyakunin Isshu.

== See also ==
- Hyakunin Isshu poem 36
- Kokin Wakashū
- Kiyohara
- Kiyohara no Motosuke
