= Fukuhara-kyō =

Capital of Japan in 1180

Coordinates: 34°41′07″N 135°10′06″E

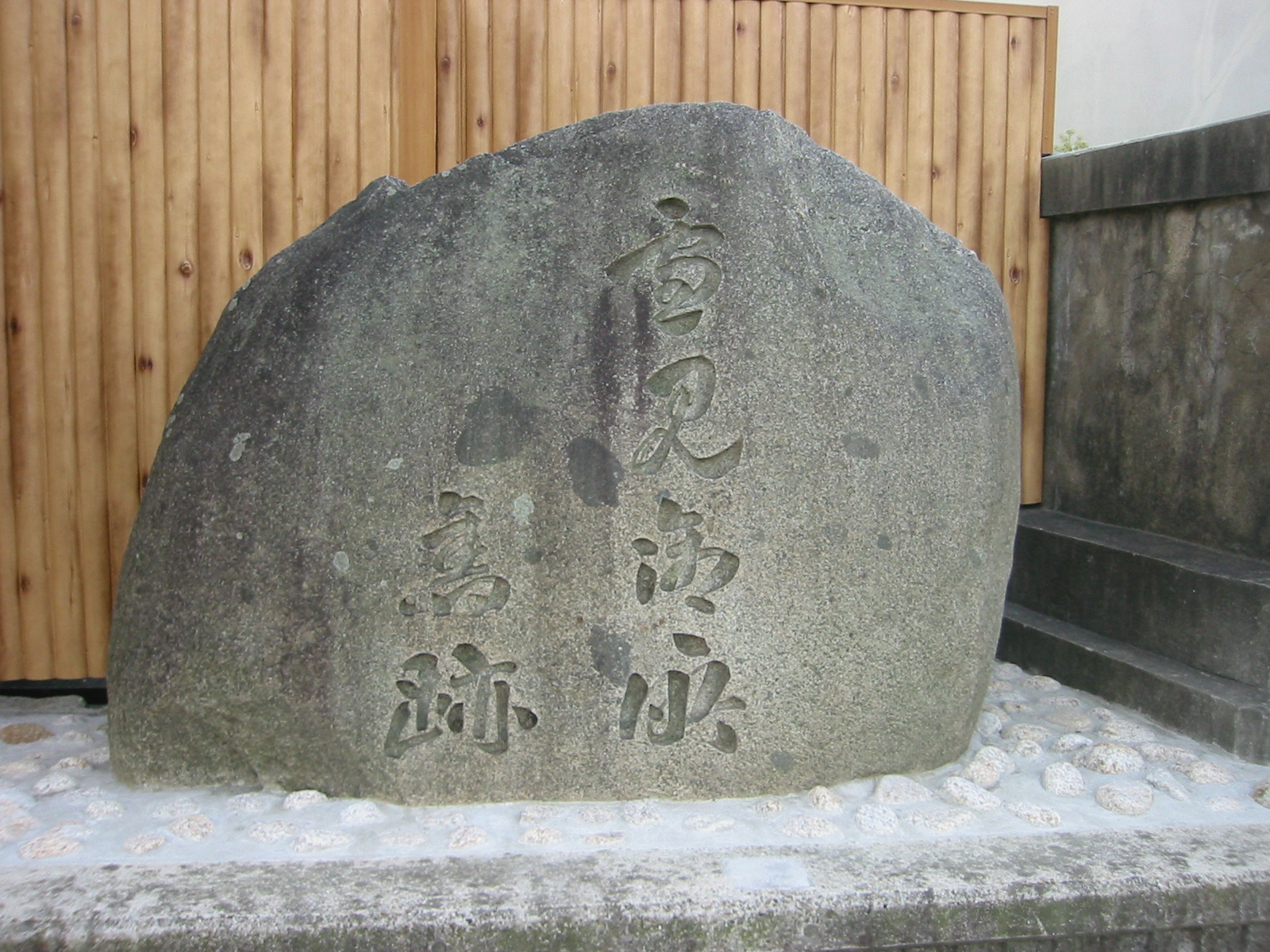
Marker indicating the former location of Fukuhara-kyō.

Fukuhara-kyō (福原京, Capital of Fukuhara) was the capital of Japan, for roughly six months in 1180. It was also the center of Taira no Kiyomori's power and the site of his retirement palace.

Fukuhara, in or near what is today Hyōgo Ward in the city of Kobe, was made the official residence of Taira no Kiyomori in 1160, following the Heiji Rebellion in which his Taira clan crushed the rival Minamoto clan. From roughly this time until his death in 1181, Kiyomori was the de facto political chief of state. He was appointed Daijō Daijin (Chancellor) in 1167, and married his daughter into the Imperial family, gaining even greater influence at Court.

A palace was built for him at Fukuhara, and Kiyomori also oversaw considerable improvements to the harbor there, to further his wider goals of expanding trade within the Inland Sea. Following the Shishigatani Incident of 1177–1178, Kiyomori retired to Fukuhara, distancing himself from politics, and from the social and ceremonial entanglements of the capital.

In June 1180, the Genpei War began as the Minamoto clan was called to arms by Prince Mochihito to oppose Kiyomori and his clan. Following the battle of Uji, in which Minamoto no Yorimasa, then head of the clan, was killed, Kiyomori arranged that the Imperial Court be moved from Heian-kyō (Kyoto) to Fukuhara. In doing this, he sought to ensure his claim to power, to allow himself to keep a closer eye on the Court and to involve himself directly once again in administrative affairs. This move also helped to shelter the Emperors and the Court from the dangers posed by Kiyomori's enemies, the Minamoto and their monastic allies.

On the third day of the lunar month following the battle (June 1180), Kiyomori led a huge procession of nobles and court officials, along with Emperor Antoku and Cloistered Emperors Takakura and Go-Shirakawa to Fukuhara. Government offices were re-established in lavish residences originally constructed for members of the Taira clan. Elements of the governmental administration were upset with this move, however, and the disruption it caused, and many of the nobles complained of the wet weather of the port city and the distance from Heian. Within about six months, the Court was returned to Kyoto, and Kiyomori followed.

According to the Tale of Heike, in the autumn of 1183, the retreating Heike spent a night in Fukuhara. On departure, they set fire to the imperial palace. "Even though their departure was perhaps not as painful as that when they left the capital, it nevertheless filled them with regret."

Site monuments mark the supposed sites of Kiyomori's palace, those of the Emperors, and Kiyomori's tomb.

Preceded by Heian-kyō	Capital of Japan; 1180	Succeeded by Heian-kyō

== See also ==
- Kamo no Chōmei
