= Zuihitsu =

Genre of Japanese literature

Zuihitsu (随筆) is a genre of Japanese literature consisting of loosely connected personal essays and fragmented ideas that typically respond to the author's surroundings. The name is derived from two Kanji meaning "at will" and "pen." The provenance of the term is ultimately Chinese, zuihitsu being the Sino-Japanese reading (on'yomi) of 随筆 (Mandarin: suíbǐ), the native reading (kun'yomi) of which is fude ni shitagau ("follow the brush"). Thus works of the genre should be considered not as traditionally planned literary pieces but rather as casual or randomly recorded thoughts by the authors.

== History ==
Zuihitsu emerged in the Heian Period with Sei Shōnagon's The Pillow Book. Shōnagon, a member of the Heian Imperial Court, kept a private diary of her own observations and musings about courtly life. It is unclear whether or not she intended it to be released to the public (sections of the work suggest that she did not), but the work nevertheless survived and provides an alternate view into life of the era, making it an invaluable literary as well as historical resource.

The genre next gained momentum as a respectable form of writing several centuries later in the Kamakura Period. With the depotentiation of the Heian Court and the relocation of the capital to Kamakura, near modern-day Tokyo, many intellectuals, amidst social chaos, grew disillusioned and chose to live in asceticism – a trend that also reflected the growing importance of Pure Land Buddhism. Writing from isolation, these authors reflected on the degeneracy of their contemporaries, whom they considered philistines, in comparison to themselves, as well as general consideration of the impermanence of the material world. Major works from this period include Kamo no Chōmei's Hōjōki and Yoshida Kenkō’s Tsurezuregusa.

Zuihitsu rose to mainstream popularity in the Edo period, when it found a wide audience in the newly developed merchant classes. Furthermore, it gained a scholarly foothold, as Japanese classical scholars began customarily writing in the zuihitsu style. Reputable authors from this movement include Motoori Norinaga, Yokoi Yayu, and Matsudaira Sadanobu.

== Themes ==
As a genre largely focused on personal writing and contemplation, zuihitsu writings tend to explore issues reflective of attitudes pervasive at the time of their composition. Overarching themes, however, include the nature of aristocratic life and its faults as well as the unpleasantries of the world and its denizens. Many of the works feature instances of poetry, often reflecting on typically “Japanese” themes, such as appreciation for the changing of the seasons. Additionally, Kamakura Period zuihitsu, strongly rooted in Buddhist thought, typically contains the author's musings on the impermanence of the material world.

== Major works ==
- The Pillow Book
- Hōjōki
- Tsurezuregusa
