= Yoshida Kenkō =

Japanese writer and monk (1283–1350)

Kenkō 兼好
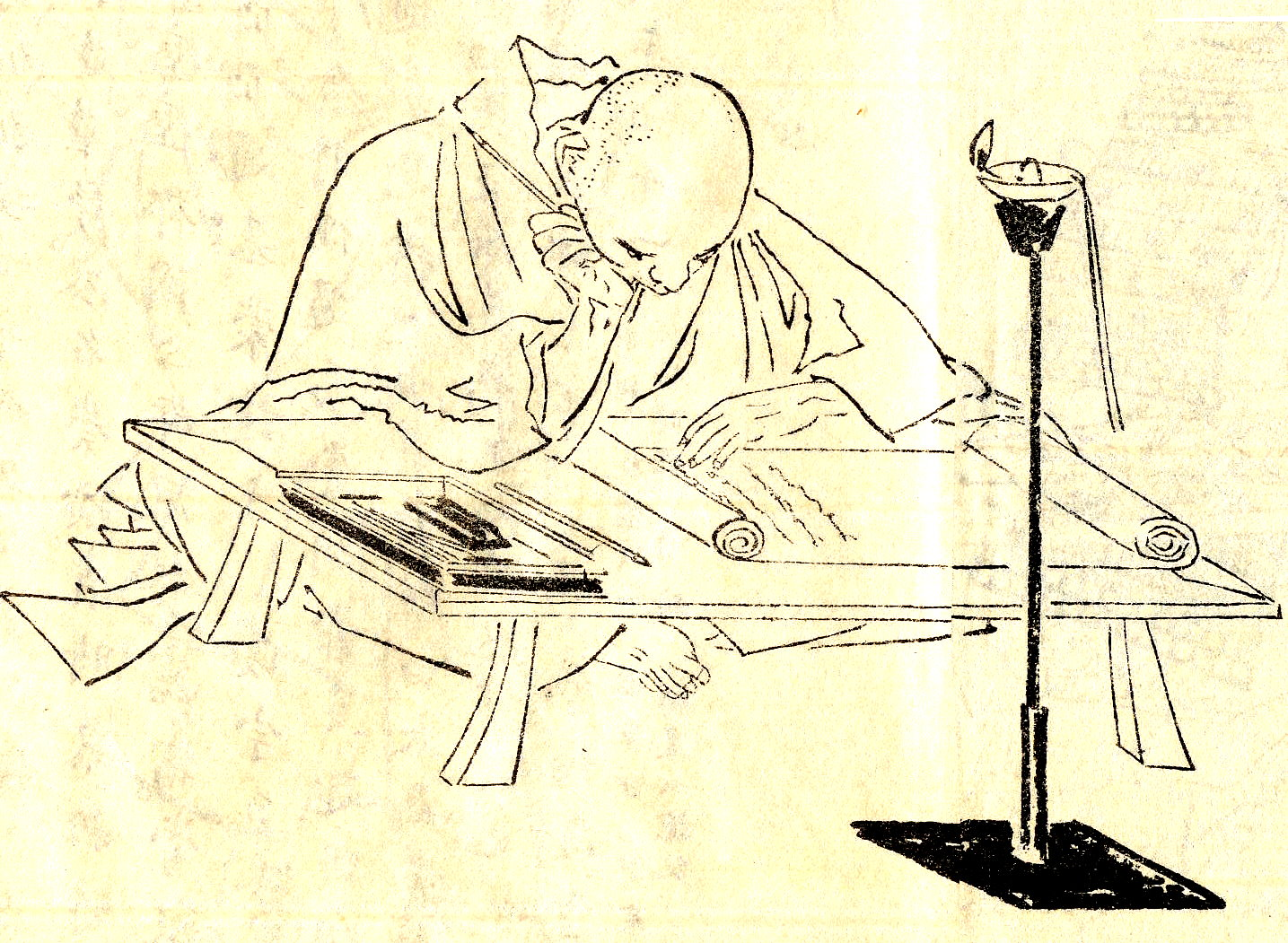
- Kenkō illustrated by Kikuchi Yōsai
- Born: c. 1283; Japan
- Died: 1350 (aged 66–67); Japan
- Occupations: Buddhist monk, writer, artist
- Writing career
- Period: Muromachi period, Kamakura period
- Notable work: Essays in Idleness

Urabe Kenkō (卜部 兼好; 1283–1350), also known as Yoshida Kenkō (吉田 兼好; Japanese pronunciation: [jo.ɕi.da (|) keꜜŋ.koː]), or simply Kenkō (兼好; [keꜜŋ.koː]), was a Japanese author and Buddhist monk. His most famous work is Tsurezuregusa (Essays in Idleness), one of the most studied works of medieval Japanese literature. Kenko wrote during the early Muromachi and late Kamakura periods.

== Life and work ==
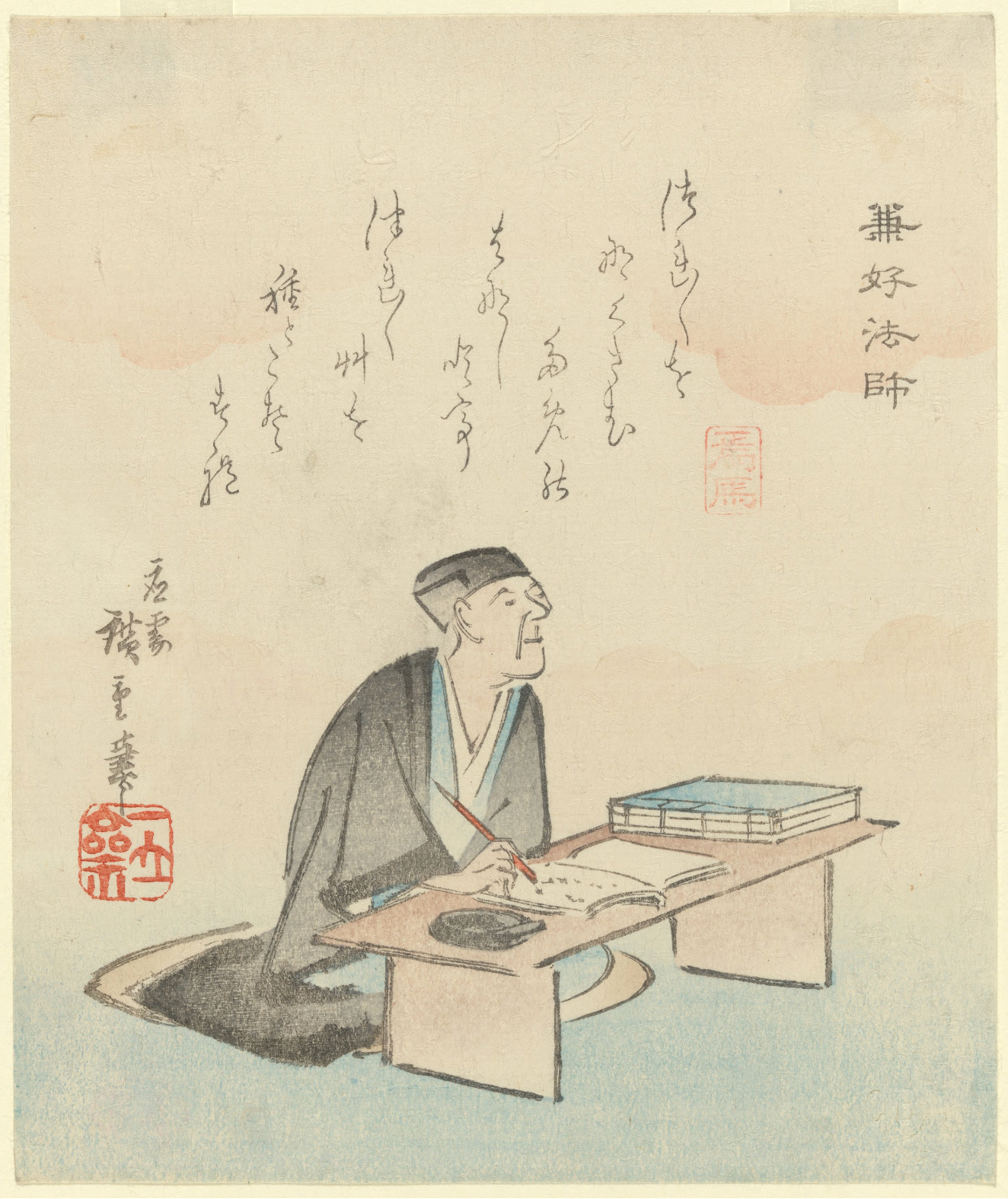
Painting of Yoshida Kenkō by Utagawa Kuniyoshi. Edo period, mid 1840s

Kenkō was probably born around 1283, as the son of an administration official. Forged documents by the Yoshida Shinto authorities claimed that his original name was Urabe Kaneyoshi (卜部 兼好), and that his last name was later changed to Yoshida (吉田); all of this was recently demonstrated to be false, according to the latest research by Ogawa Takeo. He became an officer of guards at the Imperial palace. Later in life, he retired from public life and became a Buddhist monk and hermit. The reasons for this are unknown, but it has been conjectured that it was either due to his unhappy love for the daughter of the prefect of Iga Province (current: western Mie Prefecture), or his mourning over the death of Emperor Go-Uda that caused his transformation.

Although he also wrote poetry and entered some poetry contests at the imperial court (his participation in 1335 and 1344 is documented), Kenkō's enduring fame is based on Tsurezuregusa, his collection of 243 short essays, published posthumously. Although traditionally translated as "Essays in Idleness," a more accurate translation would be "Notes from Leisure Hours" or "Leisure Hour Notes." Themes of the essays include the beauty of nature, the transience and impermanence of life, traditions, friendship, and other abstract concepts. The work was written in the zuihitsu ("follow-the-brush") style, a type of stream-of-consciousness writing that allowed the writer's brush to skip from one topic to the next, led only by the direction of thoughts. Some are brief remarks of only a sentence or two; others recount a story over a few pages, often with discursive personal commentary added.

The Tsurezuregusa was already popular in the 15th century and was considered a classic from the 17th century onwards. It is part of the modern Japanese high school curriculum, as well in some International Baccalaureate Diploma Programme schools.

== See also ==
- Chance, Linda H. Formless in Form: Kenko, Tsurezuregusa, and the Rhetoric of Japanese Fragmentary Prose. Stanford UP, 1997.
- Keene, Donald. Essays in Idleness: The Tsurezuregusa of Kenko. Columbia UP, 1967.
