= Kamo no Chōmei =

Japanese poet

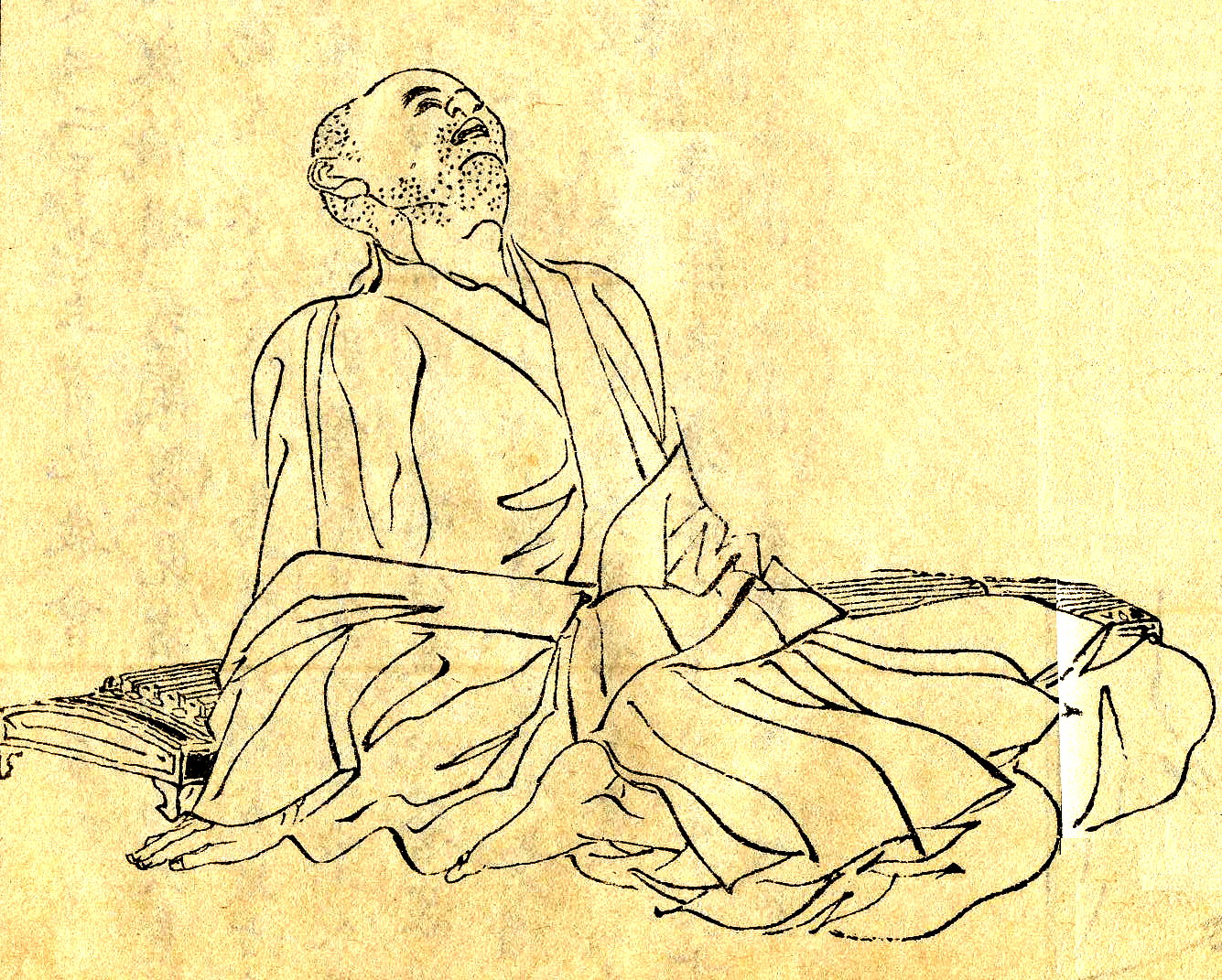
Kamo no Chōmei, by Kikuchi Yōsai

Kamo no Chōmei (鴨 長明; 1153 or 1155–1216) was a Japanese author, poet (in the waka form), and essayist. He witnessed a series of natural and social disasters, and, having lost his political backing, was passed over for promotion within the Shinto shrine associated with his family. He decided to turn his back on society, took Buddhist vows, and became a hermit, living outside the capital. This was somewhat unusual for the time, when those who turned their backs on the world usually joined monasteries. Along with the poet-priest Saigyō he is representative of the literary recluses of his time, and his celebrated essay Hōjōki ("An Account of a Ten-Foot-Square Hut") is representative of the genre known as "recluse literature" (sōan bungaku).

== Early life ==
Born with the name Kamo no Nagaakira, he was the second son of Kamo no Nagatsugu, sho-negi or superintendent, of the Lower Kamo (Shimogamo) shrine. He was also known by the title Kikudaifu. The exact year of his birth is unknown, but thought to be either 1153 or 1155, with 1155 being the generally accepted date. From an early age, he studied poetry and music in a comfortable environment. At the time, the Upper and Lower Kamo Shrines owned large amounts of property around the Kamo River, northeast of the Heian capital (Kyoto), holding great power and prestige among the aristocracy. The Kamo Festival (Aoi Matsuri), occurring in the middle of the fourth month, was considered the most important Shinto event and is vividly depicted in literature of the time, most notably in Chapter Nine of The Tale of Genji. Chōmei was raised under these religious and material conditions.

In 1160, his father was promoted to junior fourth rank, lower grade, which ultimately led the seven-year-old Chōmei to being promoted to fifth rank, junior grade; these were high positions within the Kamo Shrine hierarchy. Ill health and political maneuvering led his father to retire in 1169, however, and in the early 1170s he died. Expecting to fill the vacant role left by his father, Chōmei, then in his late teens, was passed over, and instead his cousin was promoted to this position. In poems in Kamo no Chōmei-shū, Chōmei lamented this development.

When Chōmei was in his twenties, he moved to his paternal grandmother's house. Disinheritance may have been the reason. Since Chōmei's father had been the youngest in the family, he inherited his mother's residence. In his thirties, Chōmei states in Hōjōki that after losing “backing” in his paternal grandmother's house, he was forced out, built a small house near the Kamo River. Chōmei would live here until he became a recluse.

In Hōjōki, Chōmei states that he was able to leave the world behind because he was not attached to society by marriage or offspring.

The Hōjōki is Chōmei's notebook while he lived "in a small hut" in a suburb of the capital Fukuwara. "His work contains, as well as an obviously first-hand description of Fukuwara, a striking account of material conditions in the capital in the years from 1177 to 1182."

== Life as a poet ==
After his father's death, Chōmei became more interested in poetry, and three poets were influential to his literary growth. His mentor Shōmyō (1112-1187) was of the Rokujō school, which did not receive much recognition because of a lack of patrons from the Imperial household. As his mentor, Shōmyō taught Chōmei the finer techniques and styles of court poetry. Kamo no Shigeyasu, the head Shinto priest of the Upper Kamo Shrine, was also instrumental in developing Chōmei's skill as a poet, inviting him to his poetry contests. Through Shigeyasu's influence and support, Chōmei completed a book of poems called Kamo no Chōmei-shū ("Collection") in 1181. Another important figure in the development of Chōmei's poetry was the poet priest Shun'e. Through his poetry circle, known as Karin'en (Grove of Poetry), an amalgam of people, including Shinto and Buddhist Priests, low- to mid-ranking courtiers and women in the court, shared their writings. The tales from these meetings filled a large part of Chōmei's Mumyōshō.

Music played a significant role throughout Chōmei's life. His musical mentor, Nakahara Ariyasu, was instrumental in his development, and Chōmei, known as Kikudaifu by his audience, was noted for his skill. According to an account by Minamoto no Ienaga, Chōmei's love for music was revealed in the sorrow he felt when he had to return a biwa (lute) called Tenari to the emperor.

In his thirties, Chōmei enjoyed moderate success in poetry contests and inclusion into anthologies, such as the Senzaishū. With inventive phrasing to describe nature, such as "semi no ogawa" to describe the Kamo river, Chōmei caused a bit of controversy. Entering the poem, with this phrase, into the Kamo Shrine's official poetry contest, he lost because the judge thought he was writing about a river that did not exist. Chōmei insisted, however, that the phrase had been used before and was included in the records of the shrine. Chōmei seems to have offended his cousin, who had assumed Nagatsugu's position of sho-negi. This episode shows that Chōmei still held a grudge against his cousin for becoming the new sho-negi. To rub in the embarrassment, the poem with this phrase was later included in the Shin Kokinshū.

Chōmei reached a turning point in his mid-forties. His patron, the cloistered emperor Go-Toba, supported his poetry writing. To create an anthology (Shinkokinshū) to rival the Kokinshū, Go-Toba organized the Imperial Poetry Office, filled with numerous elite courtiers and literati, among whom Chōmei was assigned as a lower level member. As a member of this organization, Chōmei enjoyed benefits that would otherwise not have been given to him, including visits to the Imperial Garden to view the cherry blossoms in bloom. Chōmei worked for the Imperial Poetry Office until he decided to become a recluse in 1204.

== Life as a recluse ==
Chōmei's specific reasons for becoming a recluse are unclear, but a string of bad luck, specifically the death of his father and his inability to fill the position left behind by him, may have caused him to leave court life. He spent the next five years in Ohara, at the foot of Mount Hiei, but considered his time here as a failure, and so he moved to Hino, in the hills southeast of the capital, where he spent the rest of his life. The design of the hut he built in Hino was inspired by the dwelling of the Buddhist recluse Vimalakirti. The Vimalakirti Sutra exerted a profound influence on Hōjōki. Chōmei wrote Mumyōshō, Hosshinshū, and Hōjōki while living as a recluse. Though Chōmei states in Hōjōki that he never left his dwelling, a separate account states that he made a trip to Kamakura to visit the shōgun and poet Minamoto no Sanetomo.

During his later life, Chōmei maintained a socio-historical perspective that was rare in court poets of the time. The accounts of chaos in the capital in the first part of Hōjōki suggest Chōmei's social interests, and he contrasts them with his peaceful life as a Buddhist in seclusion. His account coincides with the spread of Buddhism to the general populace; and his careful depictions of the natural surroundings of his hut and of the natural and social disasters in the capital form a unique microscopic and macroscopic view of life during a violent period of transition. Attention to nature and self-reflection characterize the genre of recluse literature, and Chōmei was its pre-eminent practitioner.

Chōmei died on the tenth day of the intercalary six-month of 1216, when he asked Zenjaku to complete a Kōshiki for him.

== Works ==
- Kamo no Chōmei shū (鴨長明集)
- Hōjōki (方丈記)
- Mumyōshō (無名抄)
- Hosshinshū (発心集)

== See also ==
- Japanese literature
