= Sei Shōnagon =

Japanese author and court lady

- 清少納言
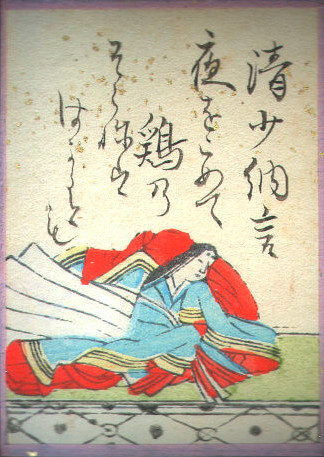
- Sei Shōnagon, illustration from an issue of Hyakunin Isshu (Edo period)
- Born: Kiyohara Nagiko (清原 諾子) c. 966
- Died: 1017 or 1025 (aged 51 or 57)
- Occupation: Lady-in-waiting to Empress Teishi
- Spouses: Tachibana no Norimitsu; Fujiwara no Muneyo
- Children: Norinaga (son); Koma no Myobu (daughter)
- Parent: Kiyohara no Motosuke (father)
- Relatives: Kiyohara no Fukayabu (great grandfather)
- Writing career
- Period: Heian period
- Notable work: The Pillow Book

Sei Shōnagon (清少納言; [sei ɕoː.naꜜ.ɡoɴ, seː-, -ŋoɴ], c. 966–1017 or 1025), or Seijo (清女; [seꜜi.(d)ʑo, seꜜː-], lit. 'Lady Sei'), was a Japanese author, poet, and court lady who served the Empress Teishi (Sadako) around the year 1000, during the middle Heian period. She is the author of The Pillow Book (枕草子, makura no sōshi).

== Name ==
Sei Shōnagon's actual given name is not known. It was the custom among aristocrats in those days to call a court lady by a nickname taken from a court office belonging to her father or husband. Sei (清) derives from her father's family name "Kiyohara" (the native Japanese reading of the first character is kiyo, while the Sino-Japanese reading is sei). Shōnagon (少納言, "lesser councilor of state") refers to a government post, although her relationship to this post is unknown—neither her father nor either of her two husbands held such a post. Bun'ei Tsunoda has suggested that it may have belonged to a third husband, perhaps Fujiwara no Nobuyoshi.

Her actual name has been a topic of debate among scholars, and the name Kiyohara no Nagiko (清原 諾子) is a possibility.

== Early life ==
Little is known about her life except what can be found in her writing. She was the daughter of Kiyohara no Motosuke, a scholar and well-known waka poet, who worked as a provincial official. Her grandfather Kiyohara no Fukayabu was also a waka poet. The family were middle-ranking courtiers and had financial difficulties, possibly because they were not granted a revenue-producing office.

She married Tachibana no Norimitsu, a government official at 16, and gave birth to a son, Norinaga. In 993, at 27, when she began to serve the Empress Teishi, consort of Emperor Ichijō, she may have been divorced. When her court service ended she may have married Fujiwara no Muneyo, governor of Settsu province, and had a daughter, Koma no Myobu, although some evidence suggests she became a Buddhist nun.

Hiroaki Sato questions whether Lady Sei and Norimitsu were actually married or just close friends, "the ladies and gentlemen of the court teased them by calling him her big brother and her his little sister."

== Rival ==
Shōnagon is also known for her rivalry with her contemporary, writer and court lady Murasaki Shikibu, author of The Tale of Genji who served the Empress Shoshi, second consort of the Emperor Ichijō. Murasaki Shikibu wrote about Shōnagon – somewhat scathingly, though conceding Shōnagon's literary gifts – in her diary, The Diary of Lady Murasaki.

== Writing ==
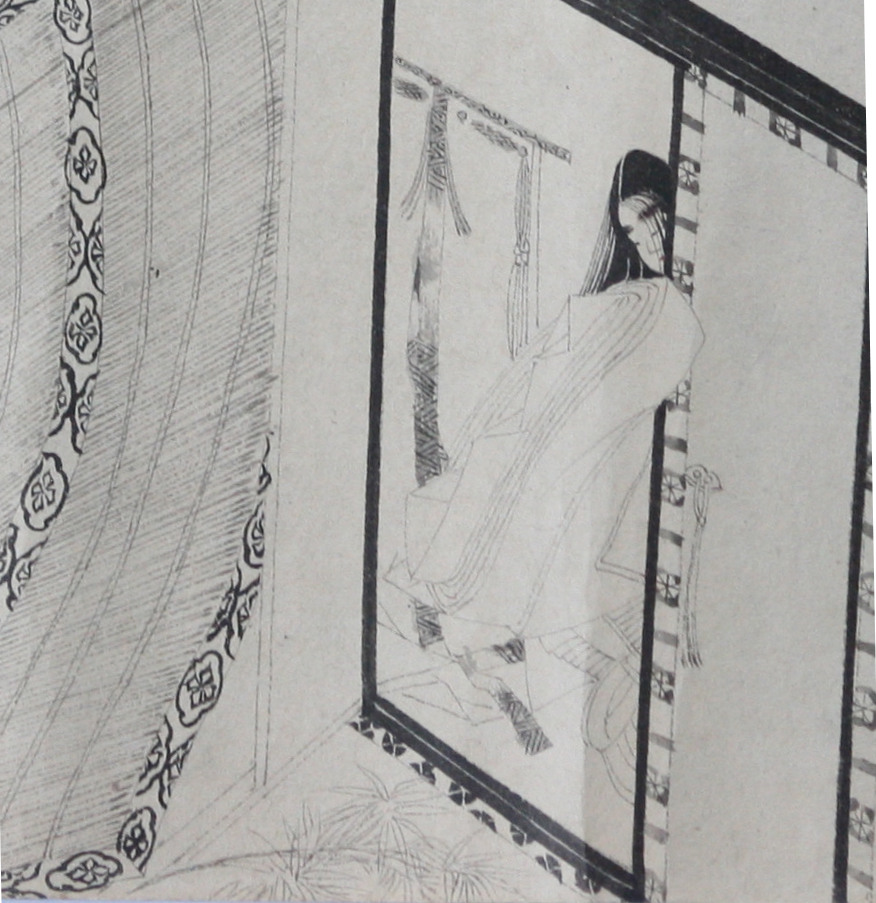
Sei Shōnagon in a later 13th-century drawing

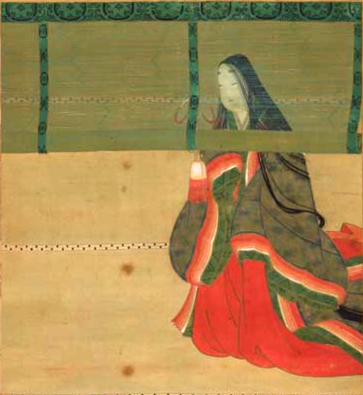
Sei Shōnagon in a later 17th-century drawing

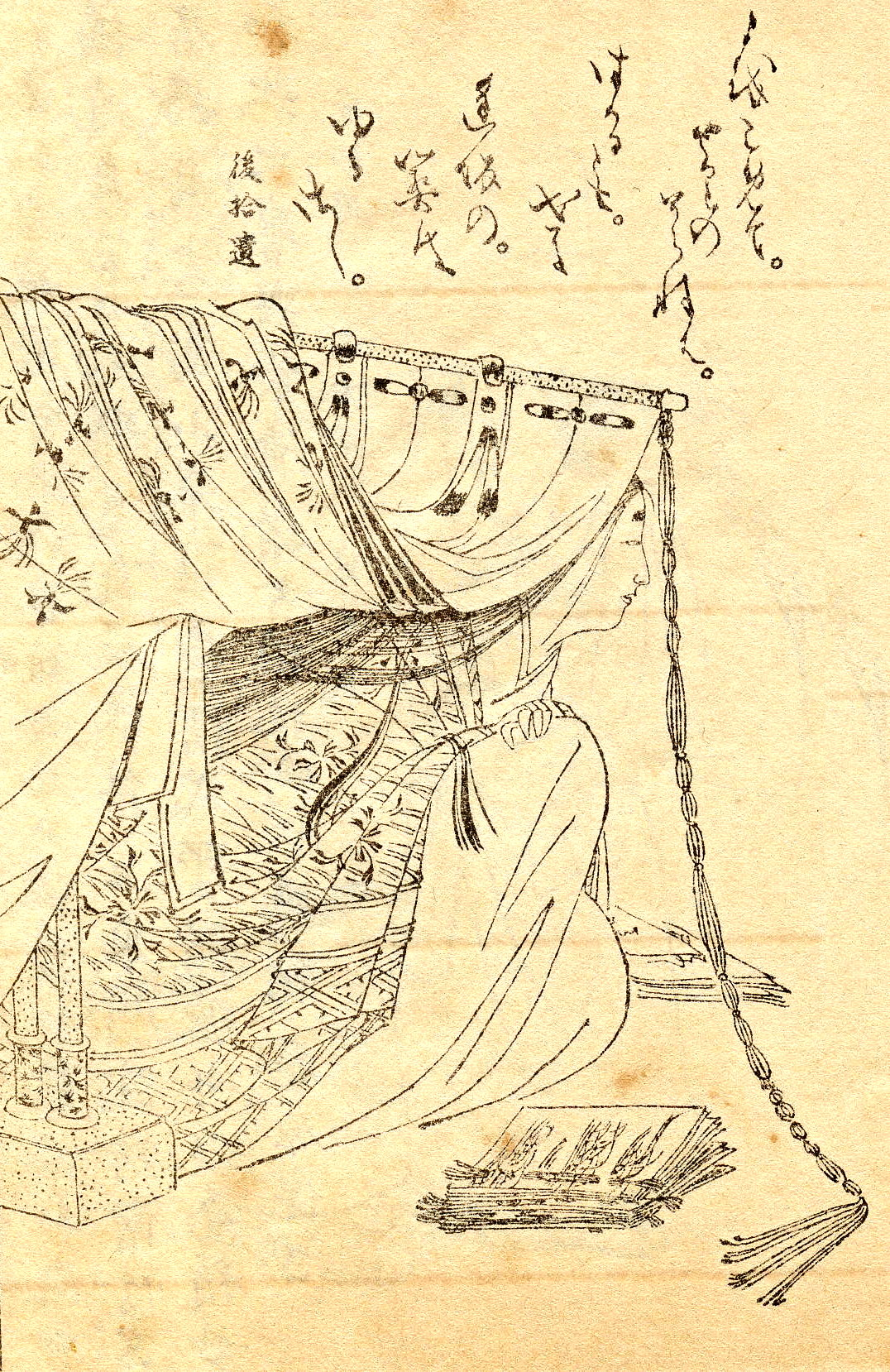
Sei Shōnagon, drawing by Kikuchi Yosai (1788–1878)

Shōnagon became popular through her work The Pillow Book, a collection of lists, gossip, poetry, observations and complaints written during her years in the court, a miscellaneous genre of writing known as zuihitsu. Shōnagon's essays describe the various daily experiences and customs of the time, and the affairs of the Imperial Court in Kyoto where she lived, from a unique point of view. The Pillow Book was circulated at court, and for several hundred years existed in handwritten manuscripts. First printed in the 17th century, it exists in different versions: the order of entries may have been changed by scribes with comments and passages added, edited, or deleted. Four main variants of the text are known to modern scholars. The two considered to be the most complete and accurate are the Sankanbon and Nōinbon texts. Later editors introduced section numbers and divisions; the Sankanbon text is divided into 297 sections, with an additional 29 supplemental sections which may represent later additions by the author or copyists.

In The Pillow Book, Shōnagon writes about Empress Teishi, and her disappointment after her father's death when Fujiwara no Michinaga made his daughter Shōshi consort to Ichijō, and then empress, making Teishi one of two empresses at court. Because of the risk of fire, the Imperial family did not live in the Heian Palace. Empress Teishi resided in a part of Chūgushiki, the "Bureau of Serving the (Middle) Empress", and moved to other residences as circumstances changed. Shōnagon writes with apparent lightheartedness about events at court, de-emphasizing or omitting harsh realities such as Teishi's death from childbirth in 1001. According to the prevalent fashion, to have written more passionately would have been considered unstylish. Her writing is considered witty, depicting Teishi's elegant court from a detailed, gossipy perspective.

Shōnagon was regarded by contemporary courtiers as having an excellent memory. Her writing includes many reminiscences of events at court, often including precise details such as the clothes people wore, despite being written down several years after the events took place. She was also known to be especially adept at recalling and quoting a classic poem to suit the occasion, even by the standards of a court in which knowledge of the poetry canon was considered an essential skill.

The entries in The Pillow Book on rhetoric include advice and opinions on conversation, preaching, and letter writing. Shōnagon advocates pure language and rigorous use of formalities in the sections of advice on conversation, but also offers vignettes showing witty repartee and sociable give-and-take among the empress's ladies and between ladies and gentlemen. Shōnagon also touches upon the topic of preaching; priests who preach should be handsome and well trained in elocution, with excellent memories, and their audiences should be attentive and polite individuals who do not come to services to flirt and show off. She says that one can become distracted and inattentive when the priest is unattractive, but when he is good-looking one remains focused on his face, and as such better experiences the holiness of his sermons. Later, she offers detailed information on letter writing, offering prescriptions for paper, calligraphy, accompanying gift and bearer, and appreciation for the value of letters as gifts of love. In particular, Shōnagon paid special attention to "morning-after letters". In Japanese court society, sex between courtiers was illicit but happened very often. A social requirement was that the male send a poem on beautiful paper with a decorative flower or branch to the lady, and that she reply. Shōnagon goes in depth about this subject matter in her section called, "Things That Make One Nervous."

One of her waka is included in the famous anthology Ogura Hyakunin Isshu as No. 62.

== Later years ==
There are no details about Shōnagon's life after the year 1017, and very few records of her after the death of the Empress Teishi/Empress Sadako in 1000. According to one tradition, she lived out her twilight years in poverty as a Buddhist nun. Another tradition has her marrying Fujiwara no Muneyo, the governor of Settsu province, after her court service ended, and having a daughter, Koma no Myobu. The Pillow Book is thought to have been finished sometime between 1001 and 1010, while Shōnagon was in retirement.

== Chronology ==
This is a chronology of Shōnagon's life. Main background events are included. Names are given in the Japanese order, family name first.

- 966? Sei Shōnagon born. Father Kiyohara Motosuke, mother’s name unknown.
- 967 Emperor Murakami, Ichijō’s grandfather, dies. Succeeded by Reizei (950–1011), the second son of Emperor Murakami.
- 969 Enyū (born 959), Ichijō’s father, succeeds to the throne.
- 975 Princess Senshi (964–1035) becomes Kamo High Priestess (until 1031).
- 977 Fujiwara Teishi born. Father Fujiwara Michitaka (b. 953), mother Takashina Kishi (d. 996).
- 978 Fujiwara Senshi (962–1001), daughter of Fujiwara Kaneie, becomes Empress of Emperor Enyū.
- 980 Ichijō born. Father Emperor Enyū, mother Fujiwara Senshi.
- 984 Emperor Enyū retires and takes Buddhist orders. Succeeded by Kazan (968–1008), eldest son of Emperor Reizei.
- 986 Emperor Kazan retires and takes Buddhist orders. Succeeded by Ichijō.
- 990 Teishi becomes high consort to Emperor Ichijō. Fujiwara Kaneie, Michitaka’s father, becomes Chancellor.
- 991 Retired Emperor Enyū dies; Empress Dowager, Fujiwara Senshi, takes the tonsure.
- 993 Fujiwara Michitaka becomes Chancellor. ? Sei Shōnagon becomes a gentlewoman in Teishi’s court.
- 994? Fujiwara Korechika (974–1010), Michitaka’s son, presents Empress Teishi with the paper Sei Shōnagon will use for her Pillow Book.
- 995 Chancellor Fujiwara Michitaka dies. Michitaka’s brother and rival, Fujiwara Michinaga (966–1027), increases his power.
- 996 Teishi’s brothers Korechika and Takaie (979–1044) attack retired emperor Kazan; they are arrested and forced to leave the capital. ? Governor of Ise Minamoto Tsunefusa visits Sei Shōnagon and discovers and circulates the early draft of The Pillow Book. Teishi gives birth to a daughter, Princess Shūshi.
- 997 Korechika and Takaie are allowed to return to the capital.
- 999 Major fire at Imperial Palace. Teishi gives birth to a son, Prince Atsuyasu.
- 1000 Michinaga’s daughter Shōshi becomes high consort to Emperor Ichijō, replacing Teishi in his favour. Teishi gives birth to a daughter, Princess Kyōshi, and dies two days later. Sei Shōnagon leaves the court.
- 1011 Emperor Ichijō dies. Succeeded by Sanjō.
- 1017 Last reference to Sei Shōnagon.

== Bibliography ==
- Keene, Donald (1999) [1993]. A History of Japanese Literature, Vol. 1: Seeds in the Heart – Japanese Literature from Earliest Times to the Late Sixteenth Century (paperback ed.). New York, NY: Columbia University Press. ISBN 978-0-231-11441-7.
- Donawerth, Jane (2002). Rhetorical Theory by Women Before 1900. Lanham, Maryland: Rowman & Littlefield. ISBN 978-0-7425-1716-5.
- Sato, Hiroaki (1995). Legends of the Samurai. Overlook Duckworth. ISBN 9781590207307.
- Tsunoda Bun'ei 1975. "Sei Shōnagon no Shōgai" in Makura Sōshi Kōza, Vol. 1. Tokyo: Yūseidō.
- Sei Shōnagon (2006). The Pillow Book. Translated by Meredith McKinney. London, England: Penguin Books, Ltd. ISBN 0-140-44806-3.
