= Sangi (Japan) =

Historical term

Premodern Japan
- Part of a series on the politics and government of Japan during the Nara and Heian periods

Daijō-kan (Council of State)
- Chancellor / Chief minister: Daijō-daijin
- Minister of the Left: Sadaijin
- Minister of the Right: Udaijin
- Minister of the Center: Naidaijin
- Major Counselor: Dainagon
- Middle Counselor: Chūnagon
- Minor Counselor: Shōnagon

Eight Ministries
- Center: Nakatsukasa-shō
- Ceremonial: Shikibu-shō
- Civil Administration: Jibu-shō
- Popular Affairs: Minbu-shō
- War: Hyōbu-shō
- Justice: Gyōbu-shō
- Treasury: Ōkura-shō
- Imperial Household: Kunai-shō

Sangi (参議) was an associate counselor in the imperial court of Japan from the 8th century until the Meiji period in the 19th century.

This was a position in the daijō-kan, or early feudal Japanese government. It was established in 702 by the Code of Taihō.

In the ranks of the Imperial bureaucracy, the Sangi came between the Shōnagon (minor councillors) and those with more narrowly defined roles, such as the Sadaiben and Udaiben who were the administrators charged with oversight of the eight ministries of the government.

In an early review of the Imperial hierarchy, Julius Klaproth's 1834 supplement to Nihon Odai Ichiran conflated the hierarchical position with a functional role as the director of palace affairs.

Prominent among those holding this office were three brothers:

- Fujiwara no Fusasaki held the office of Sangi until he died in 737 (Tenpyō 9, 4th month)
- Fujiwara no Maro held the office of Sangi until he died in 737 (Tenpyō 9, 7th month)
- Fujiwara no Umakai held the office of Sangi until he died in 737 (Tenpyō 9, 8th month)

The position was eliminated in 1885. The House of Councillors (参議院 Sangi'in) and its members were named after it.

== Sangi in context ==
Any exercise of meaningful powers of court officials in the pre-Meiji period reached its nadir during the years of the Tokugawa shogunate, and yet the core structures of ritsuryō government did manage to endure for centuries.

In order to appreciate the office of Sangi, it is necessary to evaluate its role in the traditional Japanese context of a durable yet flexible framework. This was a bureaucratic network and a hierarchy of functionaries. The role of Sangi was an important element in the Daijō-kan (Council of State). The Daijō-kan schema proved to be adaptable in the creation of constitutional government in the modern period.

=== Highest Daijō-kan officials ===
The highest positions in the court hierarchy can be cataloged. A dry list provides a superficial glimpse inside the complexity and inter-connected relationships of the Imperial court structure.

- Daijō daijin (Chancellor of the Realm or Chief Minister).
- Sadaijin (Minister of the Left).
- Udaijin (Minister of the Right).
- Naidaijin (Minister of the Center).

The next highest tier of officials were:

- Dainagon (Major counselor). There are commonly three Dainagon; sometimes more.
- Chūnagon (Middle counselor).
- Shōnagon (Minor counselor); there are commonly three Shōnagon.

Other high-ranking bureaucrats who function somewhat flexibly within the Daijō-kan were;

- Sangi (Associate counselor). This office functions as a manager of Daijō-kan activities within the palace.
- Geki (外記) (Secretariat). These are specifically named men who act at the sole discretion of the emperor. Among the duties of the Geki include writing out the patents and titles conferred by the emperor. In cases of dispute between high officers, the Geki draft a statement of the case for both sides. Also, they look after any newly introduced business.

=== The Eight Ministries ===
The government ministries were eight semi-independent bureaucracies. A list alone cannot reveal much about the actual functioning of the Daijō-kan, but the broad hierarchical categories do suggest the way in which governmental functions were parsed:

Left

- Ministry of the Center.
- Ministry of Civil Services; also known as the "Ministry of Legislative Direction and Public Instruction".
- Ministry of Ceremonies; also known as the "Ministry of the Interior".
- Ministry of Taxation.

Right

- Ministry of the Military.
- Ministry of Justice.
- Ministry of the Treasury.
- Ministry of the Imperial Household.

The specific ministries above are not grouped arbitrarily. The two court officials below had responsibility for them as follows:

- Major Controller of the Left (左大弁, Sadaiben) This administrator was charged or tasked with supervising four ministries: Center, Civil Services, Ceremonies, and Taxation.
- Major Controller of the Right (右大弁, Udaiben) This administrator was charged or tasked with supervising four ministries: Military, Justice, Treasury and Imperial Household.

== See also ==
- Daijō-kan
- House of Councillors,Sangiin
- Sessho and Kampaku
- Kōkyū
- Kuge
- Imperial Household Agency
