= Imperial Court in Kyoto =

Nominal government of Japan from 794 to the late 19th century

Premodern Japan
- Part of a series on the politics and government of Japan during the Nara and Heian periods

Daijō-kan (Council of State)
- Chancellor / Chief minister: Daijō-daijin
- Minister of the Left: Sadaijin
- Minister of the Right: Udaijin
- Minister of the Center: Naidaijin
- Major Counselor: Dainagon
- Middle Counselor: Chūnagon
- Minor Counselor: Shōnagon

Eight Ministries
- Center: Nakatsukasa-shō
- Ceremonial: Shikibu-shō
- Civil Administration: Jibu-shō
- Popular Affairs: Minbu-shō
- War: Hyōbu-shō
- Justice: Gyōbu-shō
- Treasury: Ōkura-shō
- Imperial Household: Kunai-shō

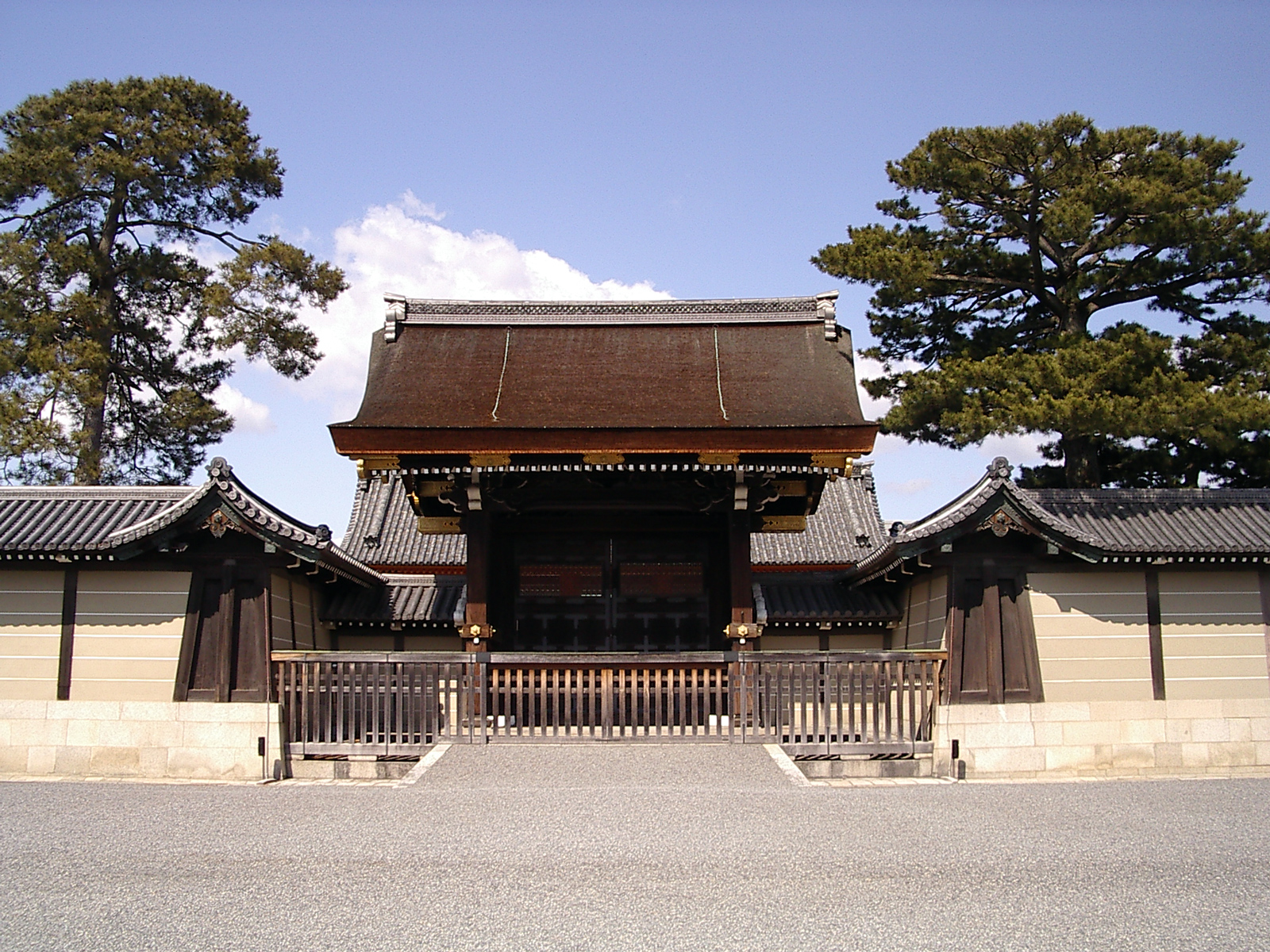
Front view of Kyoto Imperial Palace

The Imperial Court in Kyoto was the nominal ruling government of Japan from 794 AD until the Meiji period (1868–1912), after which the court was moved from Kyoto (formerly Heian-kyō) to Tokyo (formerly Edo) and integrated into the Meiji government. Upon the court being moved to Kyoto from Nagaoka by Emperor Kanmu (737–806), the struggles for power regarding the throne that had characterized the Nara period diminished. Kyoto was selected as the location for the court because of its "proper" amount of rivers and mountains which were believed to be the most auspicious surroundings for the new capital. The capital itself was built in imitation of Chang'an, the Chinese capital of the Tang dynasty, closely following the theories of yin-yang. The most prominent group of people within the court was the civil aristocracy (kuge) which was the ruling class of society that exercised power on behalf of the emperor of Japan.

Kyoto's identity as a political, economic, and cultural centre started to be challenged in the post-1185 era with the rise of the shogunate system which gradually seized governance from the emperor. Minamoto no Yoritomo was the first to establish the post of the shōgun as hereditary, receiving the title in 1192. After Yoritomo launched the shogunate, true political power was in the hand of the shōguns, who were mistaken several times for the emperors by representatives of Western countries. The Kamakura shogunate (or Kamakura bakufu) would go on to last for almost 150 years, from 1185 to 1333.

A specific style of old documents in Japan used at the end of the Heian period folded vertically is called tategami (竪紙), while the paper folded horizontally is called 'origami', which had a lower status than tategami. In the Kamakura period, it was used as a complaint, and 'origami' came to refer to the complaint itself. Furthermore, during the Muromachi period, origami was often used as a command document or a catalog of gifts, and it came to refer to the catalog of gifts itself.

== See also ==
- Five regent houses
- Heian Palace
- Kyoto Gosho
