= Tokudaiji Saneatsu =

Japanese politician

- 徳大寺 実淳
- Born: June 22, 1445
- Died: September 12, 1533 (aged 88)
- Occupation: Kugyō
- Children: 4
- Father: Tokudaiji Kin'ari

Tokudaiji Saneatsu (徳大寺 実淳; 22 June 1445 – 12 September 1533) was a Japanese kugyō during the Muromachi period.

He was the son of Tokudaiji Kin'ari. His children were Tokudaiji Fusako (wife of Konoe Hisamichi and mother of Konoe Taneie and Koga Haremichi), Tokudaiji Kintane, Hino Uchimitsu and a wife of Koga Michinobu.

== Biography ==
On 29 August 1462, Saneatsu was made a jusanmi (junior third court rank). From 1481 to 1485, he served as a naidaijin. He was promoted to juichii on 4 May 1485. He later served as the Minister of the Left from 1487 to 1493. Finally, from 1509 to 1511, he served as daijō-daijin. On 13 September 1511, he retired and undertook pabbajja, taking the name of Ninkei (忍継). He died in 1533.

== See also ==
- Kujō Masamoto
