= Ministry of Ceremonies =

Ministry of Ceremonies or Ceremonial may refer to:

- Ministry of Ceremonies of imperial China
- Ministry of Ceremonies of imperial Japan prior to the Meiji Restoration, referring to either of
  - Jibu-shō
  - Shikibu-shō
