= Ministry of Punishments =

Ministry of Punishments may refer to:

- Ministry of Justice (imperial China) (刑部), a Chinese government ministry between the Sui and Qing dynasties
- Ministry of Justice (pre-modern Japan) (刑部省), a Japanese government ministry between the Asuka and Meiji periods

== See also ==
- Justice ministry for a list of modern government ministries of justice
