= Ōmi Code =

Late 600's Japanese legal code

The Ōmi Code (近江令, ōmiryō) are a collection of governing rules compiled in 668AD, and the first collection of Ritsuryō laws in classical Japan. These laws were compiled by Fujiwara no Kamatari under the order of Emperor Tenji. This collection of laws is now lost and its disputed existence is supported only by short references in later documents (among which the Tōshi Kaden, a history of the Fujiwara). It is furthermore missing from the Nihon Shoki.

The Code, consisting of 22 volumes, was promulgated in the last year of Tenji's reign. This legal codification is no longer extant, but it is said to have been refined in what is known as the Asuka Kiyomihara ritsu-ryō of 689; and these are understood to have been a forerunner of the Taihō ritsu-ryō of 701.

== See also ==
- Ritsuryō
- Taihō Code
- Yōrō Code
- Asuka Kiyomihara Code
