= Takatsukasa Fuyumichi =

Takatsukasa Fuyumichi (鷹司 冬通; 1330 – 1386), son of Morohira, was kugyo or highest-ranking Japanese court noble of the Muromachi period (1336–1573). He held a regent position Kampaku from 1367 to 1369. Fuyuie was his son. His daughter married Ichijō Tsunetsugu.
