= Asuka Kiyomihara Code =

Late 600's Japanese legal code

The Asuka Kiyomihara Code (飛鳥浄御原令, Asuka Kiyomihara-ryō) refers to a collection of governing rules compiled and promulgated in 689, one of the first, if not the first collection of Ritsuryō laws in classical Japan. This also marks the initial appearance of the central administrative body called the Daijō-kan (Council of State) composed of the three ministers—the Daijō-daijin (Chancellor), the Sadaijin (Minister of the Left) and the Udaijin (Minister of the Right).

In 662, Emperor Tenji is said to have compiled the first Japanese legal code known to modern historians. The Ōmi-ryō, consisting of 22 volumes, was promulgated in the last year of Tenji's reign. This legal codification is no longer extant, but it is said to have been refined in what is known as the Asuka Kiyomihara ritsu-ryō of 689. The compilation was commenced in 681 under Emperor Tenmu. The Emperor died in 686, but the finalization of the Code took a few more years. It was promulgated in 689. These are understood to have been a forerunner of the Taihō ritsu-ryō of 701.

Although not "finalized" (not incorporating a penal code, a ritsu, for instance), the code already incorporated several important regulations (for instance compulsory registration for citizens and pestilence reporting system), which led to the more complete Taihō Code.

== See also ==
- Ritsuryō
- Ōmi Code
- Taihō Code
- Yōrō Code
