= Ōiryō =

Ōiryō (大炊寮; also pronounced as Ōizukasa and Ōi-no-tsukasa) was a bureau within the Imperial Household Ministry under the Japanese Ritsuryō system. The Bureau of Palace Kitchens was responsible for food preparation for religious ceremonies and feasts within the court. Beginning in the Heian Era, it was controlled by the Nakahara clan.

== History ==
The Asuka-, Nara- and Heian-period Imperial court hierarchy encompassed a Ministry of the Imperial Household (宮内省,, Kunai-shō). The origin of the current Imperial Household Agency can be traced back to the provisions on the government structure which were put into effect during the reign of Emperor Monmu, with significant modifications in 1702, 1870, and 1889, Daijō-kan officials within this ministry structure were: The management of food stores and food preparation within the court was encompassed within the organization structure of the ritsuryō system, including an acknowledgment of the place held by its senior officials within the structured palace hierarchy.

== Officials ==
The Chief Administrator of the Imperial Household (宮内卿,, Kunai-kyō) was the surveyor of all activities or works which were executed within the interior of the palace. Under his indirect supervision, the senior members of the Ooiryō hierarchy included:

- A. Chief storekeeper/Palace kitchens manager (大炊頭,, Ōi no kami).
- B. First assistant storekeeper/Palace kitchens manager (大炊助,, Ōi no suke).
- C. Second assistant storekeeper/Palace kitchens manager (大炊允,, Ōi no jō).
- D. Alternate assistant storekeeper/Palace kitchens manager (大炊属,, Ōi no sakan).

== See also ==
- Daijō-kan
- Imperial Household Department
