= Naidaijin =

Ancient office in the Japanese Imperial Court

Premodern Japan
- Part of a series on the politics and government of Japan during the Nara and Heian periods

Daijō-kan (Council of State)
- Chancellor / Chief Minister: Daijō-daijin
- Minister of the Left: Sadaijin
- Minister of the Right: Udaijin
- Minister of the Center: Naidaijin
- Major Counselor: Dainagon
- Middle Counselor: Chūnagon
- Minor Counselor: Shōnagon

Eight Ministries
- Center: Nakatsukasa-shō
- Ceremonial: Shikibu-shō
- Civil Administration: Jibu-shō
- Popular Affairs: Minbu-shō
- War: Hyōbu-shō
- Justice: Gyōbu-shō
- Treasury: Ōkura-shō
- Imperial Household: Kunai-shō

The Naidaijin (内大臣, Naidaijin; also pronounced uchi no otodo), literally meaning "Inner Minister", was an ancient office in the Japanese Imperial Court. Its role, rank and authority varied throughout the pre-Meiji period of Japanese history, but in general remained as a significant post under the Taihō Code.

== History ==
=== Pre-Meiji period ===
The office of Naidaijin predated the Taihō Code of 701. Fujiwara no Kamatari was the first person appointed to the post in 669. After the appointment of Fujiwara no Michitaka in 989, the office became permanently established, ranking just below that of Udaijin ("Right Minister") and Sadaijin ("Left Minister").

=== Meiji period and after ===
The office developed a different character in the Meiji period. In 1885, the title was reconfigured to mean the Lord Keeper of the Privy Seal of Japan in the Imperial Court. In that year, the office of prime minister or chief minister of the initial restoration government was the Daijō-daijin, Sanjō Sanetomi. In December, Sanjō petitioned the emperor to be relieved of his office; and he was then immediately appointed Naidaijin, or Lord Keeper of the Privy Seal.

The office of the Privy Seal was identical with the old Naidaijin only in the sense of the Japanese title—not in terms of function or powers.

The nature of the office further evolved in the Taishō and Shōwa periods. The title was abolished on November 24, 1945.

== See also ==
- Daijō-kan
- Kugyō
- Sesshō and Kampaku
- List of Daijō-daijin
- Kōkyū
- Kuge
- Imperial Household Agency
