= Minister of the Right =

Government position in pre-modern Japanese imperial court

Premodern Japan
- Part of a series on the politics and government of Japan during the Nara and Heian periods

Daijō-kan (Council of State)
- Chancellor / Chief Minister: Daijō-daijin
- Minister of the Left: Sadaijin
- Minister of the Right: Udaijin
- Minister of the Center: Naidaijin
- Major Counselor: Dainagon
- Middle Counselor: Chūnagon
- Minor Counselor: Shōnagon

Eight Ministries
- Center: Nakatsukasa-shō
- Ceremonial: Shikibu-shō
- Civil Administration: Jibu-shō
- Popular Affairs: Minbu-shō
- War: Hyōbu-shō
- Justice: Gyōbu-shō
- Treasury: Ōkura-shō
- Imperial Household: Kunai-shō

Minister of the Right (右大臣, Udaijin) was a government position in Japan during the Asuka to Meiji era. The position was consolidated in the Taihō Code of 701. The Asuka Kiyomihara Code of 689 marks the initial appearance of the Udaijin in the context of a central administrative body called the Daijō-kan (Council of State). This early Daijō-kan was composed of the three ministers—the Daijō-daijin (Chancellor), the Sadaijin (Minister of the Left) and the Udaijin. The Udaijin was the Junior Minister of State, overseeing all branches of the Daijō-kan. He would be the deputy of the Sadaijin.

From the Kamakura period (1185–1333), when the warrior class came to power in Japan, this imperial court position became an honorary position with no real authority. Oda Nobunaga, who was a powerful daimyo in the Azuchi–Momoyama period, was a daimyo who held this imperial court position. This was the first time since Minamoto no Sanetomo in 1218 that a member of the warrior class had been appointed Udaijin. Previously, the only warrior class members appointed to higher positions than Udaijin were Taira no Kiyomori and Ashikaga Yoshimitsu as Daijō-daijin, and Ashikaga Yoshinori and Ashikaga Yoshimasa as Sadaijin. The warrior class was able to use the high imperial court positions of Daijō-daijin, Sadaijin, and Udaijin, which had originally belonged to the nobility, as a means of establishing their own authority.

== See also ==
- Daijō-kan
- Kugyō
- Sesshō and Kampaku
- List of Daijō-daijin
- Kōkyū
- Kuge
- Imperial Household Agency
