= Daijō-kan =

Former government ministry of Japan

Premodern Japan
- Part of a series on the politics and government of Japan during the Nara and Heian periods

Daijō-kan (Council of State)
- Chancellor / Chief minister: Daijō-daijin
- Minister of the Left: Sadaijin
- Minister of the Right: Udaijin
- Minister of the Center: Naidaijin
- Major Counselor: Dainagon
- Middle Counselor: Chūnagon
- Minor Counselor: Shōnagon

Eight Ministries
- Center: Nakatsukasa-shō
- Ceremonial: Shikibu-shō
- Civil Administration: Jibu-shō
- Popular Affairs: Minbu-shō
- War: Hyōbu-shō
- Justice: Gyōbu-shō
- Treasury: Ōkura-shō
- Imperial Household: Kunai-shō

The Daijō-kan or Dajō-kan (Japanese: 太政官), also known as the Great Council of State, was (i) (Daijō-kan) the highest organ of Japan's premodern Imperial government under the Ritsuryō legal system during and after the Nara period or (ii) (Dajō-kan) the highest organ of Japan's government briefly restored to power after the Meiji Restoration, which was replaced by the Cabinet. In Yamato name it is also called "Ōmatsurigoto-no-Tsukasa" (於保伊萬豆利古止乃官).

It was consolidated in the Taihō Code of 702. The Asuka Kiyomihara Code of 689 marks the initial appearance of this central administrative body composed of the three ministers—the Daijō-daijin (Chancellor), the Sadaijin (Minister of the Left) and the Udaijin (Minister of the Right).

The Imperial governing structure was headed by the Daijō-kan. This council and its subsidiary ministries handled all secular administrative affairs of the country, while the Jingi-kan or Department of Worship, oversaw all matters regarding Shintō ritual, clergy, and shrines.

This structured organization gradually lost power over the 10th and 11th centuries, as the Fujiwara clan, dominating the post of Imperial regent, began to dominate the Daijō-kan as well. It became increasingly common for the regent to hold the post of chancellor or other office simultaneously. By the 12th century, the council was essentially powerless as a separate entity, though it seems clear that the system was never formally dismantled. Over centuries, the ritsuryō state produced more and more information which was carefully archived; however, over time in the Heian period, ritsuryō institutions evolved into a political and cultural system without feedback.

By the time of the Emperor Kōmei, the kuge aristocracy was joined in common goals by several newly powerful provincial figures from outside Kyoto. Together, this tenuous, undefined coalition of men worked to restore the long latent prestige, persuasive power, and active strengths of a re-invigorated Imperial center. This combination of factors thrust an archaic hierarchy into the center of national attention, but with so many other high-priority matters demanding immediate attention, there was little time or energy to invest in reforming or re-organizing the Daijō-kan.

== Ritsuryō organization and hierarchy ==
The eighth century ritsuryō innovations would prove to be durable and resilient across the span of centuries.

Any exercise of meaningful powers of court officials reached its nadir during the years of the Tokugawa shogunate, and yet the Daijō-kan did manage to persist intact through the initial years of the Meiji Restoration. It is not possible to assess or evaluate any individual office without assessing its role in the context of a durable yet flexible network and hierarchy of functionaries.

In the early Meiji period, the appointed Imperial Daijo-kan was filled with princes, aristocrats, loyalists domain lords (daimyō), and samurai.

Within months after Emperor Meiji's Charter Oath, the ancient ritsuryō structure was slightly modified with an express focus on the separation of legislative, administrative, and judicial functions within the Daijō-kan system. The evolution of a deliberative body within a modern constitutional system was gradual, and its constituent differences from the old Daijō-kan were not entirely self-evident at first, as revealed in an Imperial message in 1869:

The Assembly shall be for the wide ranging consultation of public opinion and, respecting the Imperial will which laid the foundations of national government, it will be a place where the energies of the multitude are harnessed. Thus, it is necessary that proceedings will show respect for the Imperial rescript, be united in purpose with the Daijō-kan, take the fundamentals of government to heart, judiciously address matters which arise, and act to ensure that unity within the country is not compromised.

Some months later, another major reform of the Daijō-kan re-united the legislative and executive functions which had been clearly separated earlier.

In 1871, the office of Daijō-daijin in the Great Council of State was briefly resurrected under the Meiji Constitution with the appointment of Sanjō Sanetomi. Despite the similarity of names for its constituent offices, this Daijō-kan would have been unrecognizable to Fujiwara courtiers of the Heian period. Nor would it have seemed at all familiar to those men who surrounded the emperor in the days of the Kenmu Restoration. In due course, it was decided that a modern integrated cabinet system would better serve a modern Japan. The Daijō-kan system, which had been divided into ministerial committees, would be replaced by a more modern model.

In December 1885, the old system was abolished completely; and yet, even afterwards, some elements of old system were adapted to new uses. For example, in that year, the title of Naidaijin was reconfigured to mean the Lord Keeper of the Privy Seal of Japan in the Imperial Court. The man who had previously held the office of prime minister or chief minister of the initial restoration government was the Daijō-daijin, Sanjō Sanetomi. Sanjō petitioned the emperor to be relieved of his ancient ritsuryō office; and he was then immediately appointed Naidaijin, or Lord Keeper of the Privy Seal. The office of the Privy Seal was identical with the old Naidaijin only in its Japanese title—not in terms of function or powers.

== Council of State ==
This dry catalog does provide a superficial glimpse inside the complexity of what was initially designed as a pre-feudal court structure. What this list cannot easily explain is how or why the Daijō-kan turned out to be both flexible and useful across a span of centuries:

- Chancellor of the Realm (太政大臣, Daijō-daijin) See also, Acting Chancellor (知太政官事, Chi-daijōkanji).
- Minister of the Left (左大臣, Sadaijin).
- Minister of the Right (右大臣, Udaijin).
- Minister of the Center (内大臣, Naidaijin).
- Major Counselor (大納言, Dainagon), three positions. There are commonly three Dainagon, sometimes more.
- Middle Counselor (中納言, Chūnagon), three positions. There are commonly three Chunagon, sometimes more.
- Minor Counselor (少納言, Shōnagon), three positions. There are commonly three Shōnagon.
- Associate Counselor (参議, Sangi). This office functions as a manager of daijō-kan activities within the palace.
- External secretariat (外記, Geki). These are specifically named men who act at the sole discretion of the emperor.
- Major controller of the left (左大弁, Sadaiben). This administrator was charged or tasked with supervising four ministries: Center, Civil Services, Ceremonies, and Popular Affairs.
- Major controller of the right (右大弁, Udaiben) This administrator was charged or tasked with supervising four ministries: Military, Justice, Treasury and Imperial Household.
- First assistant controller of the left (左中弁, Sachūben).
- First assistant controller of the right (右中弁, Uchūben).
- Second assistant controller of the left (左少弁, Sashōben).
- Second assistant controller of the right (右少弁, Ushōben).
- First secretary of the left (左大史, Sadaishi).
- First secretary of the right (右大史, Udaishi).
- Assistant secretaries of the left or right (史生, Shishō), 20 positions. There are twenty officials with this title.

== Ritsuryō Eight Ministries ==
The Asuka-, Nara- and Heian-period Imperial court hierarchy encompassed a multi-faceted bureaucracy focused on serving the needs of the Emperor, the Imperial family, the Imperial household and the Imperial state.

Imperial power and prestige would wax and wane during the subsequent Kamakura-, Kenmu-, Muromachi-, Nanboku-chō-, Sengoku-, Azuchi–Momoyama-, and Edo-periods; nevertheless, the basic structure of the Imperial household remained largely unchanged. A mere list of the court titles cannot reveal nearly enough about the actual functioning of the Daijō-kan; but the hierarchical relationships sketch a general context.

=== Ministry of the Center ===
The Taihō Code established a Ministry of the Center (中務省, Nakatsukasa-shō), sometimes identified as the "Ministry of Central Affairs." This ministry became the governmental agency for matters most closely pertaining to the emperor.

In the 18th century, the top ritsuryō official within this subdivision of the daijō-kan was the chief administrator of the Ministry of the Center (中務卿, Nakatsukasa-kyō). This official had the responsibility to oversee the inspection of the interior apartments of the palace; and he was granted the privilege of retaining his swords in the presence of the emperor.

Considered central were the Emperor's equerries (侍従,, Jijū), 8 positions. There are 8 officials with this title, all equal in rank and in the confidence of the Emperor. In the Meiji period, a variant equerry was introduced as part of the Imperial retinue. As explained in an excerpt from the 113th Imperial decree of 1896 (Meiji 29) (明治29年勅令第113号): "Aides-de-camp to the Emperor of Japan (侍従武官, jijū bukan) will perform attendant duties and will relay to him military matters and orders, be present at military reviews [in his name] and accompanying him to formal ceremonies and interviews."

=== Ministry of Civil Services ===
The Taihō Code established a Ministry of the Civil Services (式部省, Shikibu-shō); also known as the "Ministry of Legislative Direction and Public Instruction". This ministry collected and maintained biographical archives of meritorious subjects.

In the 18th century, the top ritsuryō official within this subdivision of the daijō-kan was the chief administrator of the Ministry of Civil Services (式部卿, Shikibu-kyō); also known as "Chief minister of public instruction." This office is ordinarily filled by a son or close relative of the emperor. Two of the offices which were deemed to fit in this "civil services" context were the Imperial court's Chief judge (式部大輔, Shikibu-taifu). and the Emperor's chief education expert (大学頭, Daigaku no kami).

=== Ministry of Ceremonies ===
The Taihō Code established a Ministry of Ceremonies (治部省, Jibu-shō); also known as the "Ministry of the Interior".

In the 18th century, the top ritsuryō official within this subdivision of the daijō-kan was the chief administrator of the Ministry of Ceremonies (治部卿,, Jibu-kyō).

=== Ministry of Popular Affairs ===
The Taihō Code established a Ministry of Popular Affairs (民部省, Minbu-shō). This ministry is concerned with the general populace, with police activities, and with land survey records. Registries for all towns and villages are maintained, including census records as well as birth and death records.

In the 18th century, the top ritsuryō official within this subdivision of the daijō-kan was the chief administrator of the Ministry of Popular Affairs (民部卿, Minbu-kyō).

=== Ministry of War ===
The Taihō Code established a Ministry of War (兵部省, Hyōbu-shō).

In the 18th century, the top ritsuryō official within this subdivision of the daijō-kan was the chief administrator of the Ministry of War (兵部卿, Hyōbu-kyō).

=== Ministry of Justice ===
The Taihō Code established a Ministry of Justice (刑部省, Gyōbu-shō).

In the 18th century, the top ritsuryō official within this subdivision of the daijō-kan was the chief administrator of the ministry of justice (刑部卿, Gyōbu-kyō).

=== Ministry of the Treasury ===
The Taihō Code established a Ministry of the Treasury (大蔵省, Ōkura-shō).

In the 18th century, the top ritsuryō official within this subdivision of the daijō-kan was the chief administrator of the ministry of the treasury (大蔵卿, Ōkura-kyō). This official supervises the receipt of tributes from the provinces and imposes tribute on others.

=== Ministry of the Imperial Household ===
The Taihō Code established a Ministry of the Imperial Household (宮内省, Kunai-shō). The origins of the current Imperial Household Agency (宮内庁, Kunai-chō) can be traced back to structures which were put into effect during the reign of Emperor Monmu, with some subsequent modifications.

In 1702, the Taika era name for the palace organization, kunai-kan or "government" of the palace, was changed to the kunai-shō or "ministry" of the palace. Accompanying this modification, the chief administrative official was afterwards called kunai-kyō. After the Meiji Restoration, the kunai-shō name remained unchanged. There were two other periods of modification and in 1889.

In the 18th century, the top ritsuryō officials within this hierarchic structure were:

- Chief administrator of the Imperial household (宮内卿, Kunai-kyō), the surveyor of all works which are executed within the interior of the palace.
- First assistant to the chief of the imperial Household (宮内大輔, Kunai-taifu).
- Second assistant to the chief of the imperial household (宮内少輔, Kunai-shō), two persons.
- Third assistant to the chief of the imperial household (宮内丞, Kunai-no-jō), two persons.
- Alternate assistants to the chief of the imperial household (宮内録, Kunai-no-sakan), two persons.

The deliberate redundancies at the top were common features of each position in this stable hierarchic schema. Many positions typically mirrored the -kyō, -taifu, -shō, -jō, and -sakan pattern.

== Tokugawa courtiers ==
Even nominal administrative powers of court officials reached a nadir during the years of the Tokugawa shogunate. In this impoverished period, titles and court rank were still prized by those outside the traditional kuge. The Tokugawa shōguns did not demur when the Emperor offered rank and an office in the court:

- Tokugawa Ieyasu had the rank of Jūichii (First Rank, Second Class) and the office of Udaijin (Great Minister of the Right, i.e., inferior to the Minister of the Left)
- Tokugawa Hidetada had the rank of Jūichii and was Daijō Daijin (the Great Minister or Chancellor of the Realm)
- Tokugawa Iemitsu had the same rank and was Sadaijin (Great Minister of the Left, i.e., superior to the Minister of the Right)
- Tokugawa Ietsuna had the rank of Shōnii (Second Rank, First Class) and was Udaijin
- Tokugawa Tsunayoshi had the rank of Shōnii and was Udaijin
- Tokugawa Ienobu had the rank of Shōnii was Naidaijin (Great Minister of the center, i.e., inferior to the Minister of the Left)
- Tokugawa Ietsugu had the rank of Shōnii was also Nadaijin
- Tokugawa Yoshimune held the rank of Shōnii and was Udaijin
- Tokugawa Ieshige also held the rank of Shōnii and was Udaijin
- Tokugawa Ieharu also held the rank of Shōnii and was Udaijin
- Tokugawa Ienari was Dainagon (Great Counselor)
- Tokugawa Ieyoshi
- Tokugawa Iesada
- Tokugawa Iemochi
- Tokugawa Yoshinobu

== Geo-political sub-divisions ==
The country was divided into provinces called kuni (国), which were administered by governors kokushi (国司) appointed by the Daijō-kan. The provinces were then further divided into districts called gun (郡; /kōri), under district governors gunji (郡司) who were appointed by the local nobility. At the beginning of the eighth century, there were 592 districts making up 66 provinces.

== See also ==
- Engishiki
- Imperial Household Agency
- Kōkyū
- Kuge
- Kugyō
- Nipon o daï itsi ran
- Sesshō and Kampaku
- Taihō Code
- Takahashi Ujibumi
- Twelve Level Cap and Rank System
- Yōrō Code
