= Ministry of Popular Affairs =

Premodern Japan
- Part of a series on the politics and government of Japan during the Nara and Heian periods

Daijō-kan (Council of State)
- Chancellor / Chief minister: Daijō-daijin
- Minister of the Left: Sadaijin
- Minister of the Right: Udaijin
- Minister of the Center: Naidaijin
- Major Counselor: Dainagon
- Middle Counselor: Chūnagon
- Minor Counselor: Shōnagon

Eight Ministries
- Center: Nakatsukasa-shō
- Ceremonial: Shikibu-shō
- Civil Administration: Jibu-shō
- Popular Affairs: Minbu-shō
- War: Hyōbu-shō
- Justice: Gyōbu-shō
- Treasury: Ōkura-shō
- Imperial Household: Kunai-shō

The Ministry of Popular Affairs (Japanese: 民部省, Hepburn: Minbu-shō) (Note: "Ministry of Popular Affairs") may refer to:

1. one of the Eight Ministries (八省) of the Japanese imperial court, established by the Taihō Code of the early 8th century, and continued under the Ritsuryō legal system.
2. A short-lived ministry during the Meiji period (August–September 1869, August 1870 – September 1871).

== Minbu-shō (Ritsuryō) ==
The ministry, established by the Taihō Code and Ritsuryō laws, was one of the Eight Ministries, in the wing of four ministries reporting to the Controlling Board of the Left (左弁官局, Sabenkankyoku) out of eight ministries. As the name indicates, this body was concerned with oversight over the affairs of the common people, viewed as taxable producers of goods. The ministry maintained various records: the population census sent from the provinces, cadastral (real estate) records, and tax accounting records.

=== Ministerial authority under Yōrō Code ===
The Yōrō Code (a revised version of the Taihō Code that created the ministry), stipulates the powers vested in the ministry, under its Official Appointments statute (職員令, Shikiin-ryō; "Article for the Ministry of Popular Affairs"). There it is stated that :

諸国戸口名籍、賦役、孝義・優復・蠲免、家人奴婢、橋道、津済、渠池、山川、藪沢、諸国田事

"the ministry is responsible for the registers of populations, (Note: The word (in) all provinces (諸国) appears at the beginning of the original text, and so "aller Provinzen" appears here in Dettmer 2009, p. 226, but Sansom leaves ".. in all provinces" to the end of paragraph.) the labour tax, family obligations [i.e. exemptions from labour tax in deserving cases, such as that of a son the sole support of aged parents, etc.];servants and slaves [who being unfree and propertyless were untaxable]; bridges and roads, harbours, fences, bays, lakes, mountains, rivers, woods, and swamps etc.; rice lands in all provinces."—Sansom tr.

In the above "all provinces" does not include the capital. The census for the aristocracy who had clan names (uji or kabane) etc. was under the purview of the Jibu-shō (Ministry of Civil Administration). And the ministry was not "directly responsible for the upkeep of roads, bridges, etc.," but merely kept such records for taxation and tax transportation tracking purposes.

=== Popular Affairs certificate ===
The ministry issued order certificates or charters called the minbushō-fu (民部省符, "Popular Affairs certificate") to officials and provincial governors (kokushi). The shōen system recognized private ownership of reclaimed rice-paddy lands, but did not automatically confer tax-exemption (as some misleading dictionary definitions suggest). From the early Heian period, the tax-exempt or leniency status was ratified by the certificate or charter (kanshōfu (官省符)) issued either by this ministry or the Great Council (daijō-kan) itself. (See kanshōfu-shō (官省符荘)). (Note: The Ministry of Popular Affairs (which dealt with the common people and not the gentry) did not have the decision-power to issue such charter on its own initiative. It merely drafted and rubberstamped the charter at the behest of the Great Council. 坂本賞三 (1985). 荘園制成立と王朝国家. 塙書房.)

In the Jōgan (貞観) period (859–877) occurred a breakdown of the Ritsuryō system under the Fujiwara no Yoshifusa regime, with authorities of the ministries absorbed by the Great Council. (Note: Entry for "貞観時代 (Jōgan jidai)" in Kadokawa historical dictionary) The decree of Jōgan 4, VII, 27 (August 826) (Note: in volume 6 of Ruijū fusen shō ("assorted orders abridged")) essentially stripped the ministry of its control over the tax-leniency policy, ordaining that all applications for tax relief would be decided completely by the Great Council of State (daijō-kan), and its ruling delivered directly to the countries by the Great Council's certificate (daijō-kan fu). The ministry still issued certificates for exemptions on the shōen estates, but this was just rubberstamping decisions from above, as before. These changes in the exercise of administration were codified in the Jogan shiki (貞観式, "Procedures of the Jogan Era") and later Engishiki. (Note: There is a shift in terminology. The exemption from kanmotsu (官物), which are mentioned in the Jōgan decree and the Engishiki, was understood to include the fuyu (不輸, "tax privlieges") rights) The ministry was thus reduced to processing clerical responsibilities concerning the provinces.

== Hierarchy ==
The Minbu-shō (民部省) was headed by the minister, whose office was ordinarily filled by a son or close relative of the emperor, of the fourth grade or higher.

- Minbu-kyō (民部卿) - "Minister of Popular Affairs"

aliases: "Chief administrator of the ministry of civil services"

- Minbu-no-tayū (民部大輔) - "Senior Assistant Minister of Popular Affairs"

aliases: "Vice-Minister"

- Minbu-no-shōyū (民部少輔) - "Junior Assistant Minister of Popular Affairs"

aliases: "Assistant Vice-Minister"

- Minbu-no-daijō (民部大丞) (x 2) - "[Senior] Secretaries"
- Minbu-no-shōjō (民部少丞) (x 2) - "Junior Secretaries"
- Minbu-dairoku or Minbu-no-dai-sakan (民部大録) (x 1) - "[Senior] Recorder"
- Minbu-shōroku or Minbu-no-shō-sakan (民部少録) (x 3) - "Junior Recorders"

Under the Ministry were two bureaus:

The Shukei-ryō, or Kazue-no-tsukasa (主計寮), the "Bureau of Computation" or "Bureau of Statistics." was in charge of two forms of taxes, the chō (調, "handicraft tax") and the yō (庸corvée). The yō was a form of conscripted compulsory labor, or more often the goods paid to be exempt from the obligation.

The Shuzei-ryō or Chikara-ryō (主税寮), the "Tax Bureau," was in charge of the third form of tax, the so (租, "land tax (paid by rice)"). The three forms of taxes were known as Soyōchō (租庸調) under the Ritsuryō system.

- Kazue-no-kami (主計頭) - "Director"
- Kazue-no-suke (主計助) - "Assistant director"
- Kazue-no-taijō (主計大允) - "Secretary"
- Kazue-no-shōjō (主計少允) - "Assistant Secretary"
- Kazue-no-dai-sakan (主計大属) - "Senior Clerk"
- Kazue-no-shōzoku (主計少属) - "Junior Clerk"
- Sanshi (算師) (x 2) - "Accountants"

trained mathematicians who calculated tax revenue and expenditures.

- Chikara-no-kami (主税頭) - "Director"

The director was in charge of dispensing and receipt from the government granaries. so

- Chikara-no-suke (主計助) - "Assistant director"
- Chikara-no-taijō (主税大允) - "Secretary"
- Chikara-no-shōjō (主税少允) - "Assistant Secretary"
- Chikara-no-dai-sakan (主税大属) - "Senior Clerk"
- Chikara-no-shōzoku (主税少属) - "Junior Clerk"
- Sanshi (算師) (x 2) - "Accountants"

trained mathematicians who kept tax records.

The Rinin (廩院) was an ancillary facility to this ministry that stored a portion of the corvée tax (yō of soyōchō) and nenryō shōmai (年料舂米, "yearly assessed polished rice"), which were distributed during ceremonies and functions. (Note: This differs from the Ōiryō, the granary of the Imperial Household Ministry.)

== Personages who held offices ==
- Ariwara no Yukihira (Ariwara no Yukihira), minister (883–887), known as Zai Minbukyō ("Zai" being the Chinese reading of the first letter of his surname).
- Sugawara no Michizane (菅原道真), junior assistant minister (874), minister (896).
- Fujiwara no Tadabumi (藤原忠文) 873–947, aka "Uji no Minbukyō" or "the Uji Director (of the Ministry of Popular Affairs).
- The fictional Fujiwara no Koremitsu (藤原惟光), foster brother of Hikaru Genji was Minbu no taifu.
- Fujiwara no Tameie (1198–1275) was nominal minister, but governance had already shifted to samurai in the Kamakura period

== List of translated aliases ==
literal

- Bureau of Civil Affairs
- Popular Affairs Department
- Popular Affairs Ministry
- Ministry of Popular Affairs
- Ministry of Population

semantic

- Department of Revenue and Census
- Ministry of Civil Administration
- Ministry of Civil Services
- Ministry of Personnel

== See also ==
- Daijō-kan
