= Chūnagon =

Premodern Japan
- Part of a series on the politics and government of Japan during the Nara and Heian periods

Daijō-kan (Council of State)
- Chancellor / Chief Minister: Daijō-daijin
- Minister of the Left: Sadaijin
- Minister of the Right: Udaijin
- Minister of the Center: Naidaijin
- Major Counselor: Dainagon
- Middle Counselor: Chūnagon
- Minor Counselor: Shōnagon

Eight Ministries
- Center: Nakatsukasa-shō
- Ceremonial: Shikibu-shō
- Civil Administration: Jibu-shō
- Popular Affairs: Minbu-shō
- War: Hyōbu-shō
- Justice: Gyōbu-shō
- Treasury: Ōkura-shō
- Imperial Household: Kunai-shō

Chūnagon (中納言) was a counselor of the second rank in the Imperial court of Japan. The role dates from the 7th century.

The role was eliminated from the Imperial hierarchy in 701, but it was re-established in 705. This advisory position remained a part of the Imperial court from the 8th century until the Meiji period in the 19th century.

This became a Taihō Code office in the early feudal Japanese government or daijō-kan.

In the ranks of the Imperial bureaucracy, the Chūnagon came between the Dainagon (major counselors) and the Shōnagon (minor counselors). Imperial honors included the sometimes creation of a temporary or "acting middle counselor" (権中納言, gon-chūnagon).

The number of Chūnagon has varied, from three in 705 to four in 756. There were eight in 1015; and in later years, there were up to ten Chūnagon at one time.

== Chūnagon in context ==
Any exercise of meaningful powers of court officials in the pre-Meiji period reached its nadir during the years of the Tokugawa shogunate, and yet the core structures of ritsuryō government did manage to endure for centuries.

In order to appreciate the office of Chūnagon, it is necessary to evaluate its role in the traditional Japanese context of a durable yet flexible framework. This was a bureaucratic network and a hierarchy of functionaries. The role of Chūnagon was an important element in the Daijō-kan (Council of State). The Daijō-kan schema proved to be adaptable in the creation of constitutional government in the modern period.

=== Highest Daijō-kan officials ===
The highest positions in the court hierarchy can be cataloged. A dry list provides a superficial glimpse inside the complexity and inter-connected relationships of the Imperial court structure.

- Daijō-daijin (Chancellor of the Realm or Chief Minister).
- Sadaijin (Minister of the Left).
- Udaijin (Minister of the Right).
- Naidaijin (Minister of the Center).

The next highest tier of officials were:

- Dainagon (Major counselor, chief counselor of state). There are commonly three Dainagon; sometimes more.
- Chūnagon (Middle counselor).
- Shōnagon (Minor counselor); there are commonly three Shōnagon.

Other high-ranking bureaucrats who function somewhat flexibly within the Daijō-kan were;

- Sangi (Associate counselor). This office functions as a manager of Daijō-kan activities within the palace.
- Geki (外記) (Secretariat). These are specifically named men who act at the sole discretion of the emperor.

=== The Eight Ministries ===
The government ministries were eight semi-independent bureaucracies. A list alone cannot reveal much about the actual functioning of the Daijō-kan, but the broad hierarchical categories do suggest the way in which governmental functions were parsed:

Left

- Ministry of the Center.
- Ministry of Civil Services; also known as the "Ministry of Legislative Direction and Public Instruction".
- Ministry of Ceremonies; also known as the "Ministry of the Interior".
- Ministry of Taxation.

Right

- Ministry of the Military.
- Ministry of Justice.
- Ministry of the Treasury.
- Ministry of the Imperial Household.

The specific ministries above are not grouped arbitrarily. The two court officials below had responsibility for them as follows:

- Major Controller of the Left (左大弁, Sadaiben) This administrator was charged or tasked with supervising four ministries: Center, Civil Services, Ceremonies, and Taxation.
- Major Controller of the Right (右大弁, Udaiben) This administrator was charged or tasked with supervising four ministries: Military, Justice, Treasury and Imperial Household.

== See also ==
- Daijō-kan
- Sesshō and Kampaku
- Kōkyū
- Kuge
- Imperial Household Agency
- Hamamatsu Chūnagon Monogatari
- Tsutsumi Chūnagon Monogatari
- Torikaebaya Monogatari
