= Minister of the Left =

Government position in pre-modern Japanese imperial court

Premodern Japan
- Part of a series on the politics and government of Japan during the Nara and Heian periods

Daijō-kan (Council of State)
- Chancellor / Chief minister: Daijō-daijin
- Minister of the Left: Sadaijin
- Minister of the Right: Udaijin
- Minister of the Center: Naidaijin
- Major Counselor: Dainagon
- Middle Counselor: Chūnagon
- Minor Counselor: Shōnagon

Eight Ministries
- Center: Nakatsukasa-shō
- Ceremonial: Shikibu-shō
- Civil Administration: Jibu-shō
- Popular Affairs: Minbu-shō
- War: Hyōbu-shō
- Justice: Gyōbu-shō
- Treasury: Ōkura-shō
- Imperial Household: Kunai-shō

The Minister of the Left (左大臣, Sadaijin) was a government position in Japan during the Asuka to Meiji era. The Asuka Kiyomihara Code of 689 marks the initial appearance of the Sadaijin in the context of a central administrative body called the Daijō-kan (太政官, Council of State). This early Daijō-kan was composed of the three ministers—the Daijō-daijin (太政大臣, Chancellor of the Realm), the Sadaijin and the Udaijin (右大臣, Minister of the Right). The position was consolidated in the Taihō Code of 702. It is also called Ohoi-Mauchi-Kimi (於保伊萬宇智岐美).

When the Emperor and the nobility held real power, the Sadaijin was the highest permanent position in the Daijō-kan, the central organ of the state. The higher-ranking Daijō-daijin was not a permanent position, but was only appointed when a suitable person was found. The Sadaijin was the Senior Minister of State, overseeing all functions of government with the Udaijin as his deputy.

During the Heian period (794-1185), from the middle of the 9th century, the Fujiwara clan began to marry off their daughters to the emperor and assume the positions of Sesshō (摂政, Imperial Regent for Minor Emperors) and Kampaku (関白, Imperial Regent for Adult Emperors), thereby excluding other clans from the political centre and increasing their political power. From the 10th century, the Fujiwara clan monopolised the positions of Sesshō and Kampaku. However, at the end of the 10th century, Fujiwara no Michinaga, who established the heyday of the Fujiwara clan became Sadaijin, a position of real power, rather than Kampaku, the highest nominal position. The duties of the Sesshō and Kampaku were to convey to the emperor the policies formulated by the Sadaijin and other senior officials of the Daijō-kan, and to convey the emperor's decisions to them. As regents of the emperor, the Sesshō and Kampaku sometimes made decisions on behalf of the emperor, but their positions were not defined by law and they had no specific political authority. The Sadaijin, on the other hand, was the highest permanent position in the Daijō-kan, the country's highest authority for planning and deciding important political matters, which is why Michinaga chose the Sadaijin.

From the Kamakura period (1185-1333), when the warrior class came to power in Japan, this government position became an honorary position with no real authority. At the time of Oda Nobunaga's appointment as Udaijin during the Azuchi–Momoyama period, the only members of the warrior class who had previously been appointed to imperial court posts higher than Udaijin were Taira no Kiyomori and Ashikaga Yoshimitsu as Daijō-daijin and Ashikaga Yoshinori and Ashikaga Yoshimasa as Sadaijin.

== List ==
=== Asuka period ===
- 645-649 Abe no Uchimaro (阿倍内麻呂) (?-649)
- 649-658 Kose no Tokota (巨勢徳多) (?-658)
- 671-672 Soga no Akae (蘇我赤兄) (?-?)
- 700-701 Tajihi no Shima (多治比嶋) (624-701)
- 708-717 Isonokami no Maro (石上麻呂) (640-717)

=== Nara period ===
- 724-729 Prince Nagaya (長屋王) (684-729)
- 737 Fujiwara no Muchimaro (藤原武智麻呂) (680-737)
- 743-756 Tachibana no Moroe (橘諸兄) (684-757)
- 766-771 Fujiwara no Nagate (藤原永手) (714-771)
- 781-782 Fujiwara no Uona (藤原魚名) (721-783)

=== Heian Period ===
- 825-826 Fujiwara no Fuyutsugu (藤原冬嗣) (775-826)
- 832-843 Fujiwara no Otsugu (藤原緒嗣) (774-843)
- 844-854 Minamoto no Tokiwa (源常) (812-854)
- 857-869 Minamoto no Makoto (源信) (810-869)
- 872-895 Minamoto no Tōru (源融) (822-895)
- 896-897 Fujiwara no Yoshiyo (藤原良世) (823-900)
- 899-909 Fujiwara no Tokihira (藤原時平) (871-909)
- 924-936 Fujiwara no Tadahira (藤原忠平) (880-949)
- 937-945 Fujiwara no Nakahira (藤原仲平) (875-945)
- 947-968 Fujiwara no Saneyori (藤原実頼) (900-970)
- 968-969 Minamoto no Takaakira (源高明) (914-983)
- 970 Fujiwara no Arihira (藤原在衡) (892-970)
- 971-977 Minamoto no Kaneakira (源兼明) (914-987)
- 977-978 Fujiwara no Yoritada (藤原頼忠) (924-989)
- 978-993 Minamoto no Masanobu (源雅信) (920-993)
- 994-995 Minamoto no Shigenobu (源重信) (922-995)
- 996-1017 Fujiwara no Michinaga (藤原道長) (966-1028)
- 1017-1021 Fujiwara no Akimitsu (藤原顕光) (944-1021)
- 1021-1060 Fujiwara no Yorimichi (藤原頼通) (992-1074)
- 1060-1069 Fujiwara no Norimichi (藤原教通) (996-1075)
- 1069-1083 Fujiwara no Morozane (藤原師実) (1042-1101)
- 1083-1121 Minamoto no Toshifusa (源俊房) (1035-1121)
- 1123-1129 Fujiwara no Tadamichi (藤原忠通) (1097-1164)
- 1132-1136 Fujiwara no Ietada (藤原家忠) (1062-1136)
- 1137-1147 Minamoto no Arihito (源有仁) (1103-1147)
- 1149-1156 Fujiwara no Yorinaga (藤原頼長) (1120-1156)
- 1156-1157 Tokudaiji Saneyoshi (徳大寺実能) (1096-1157)
- 1157-1160 Fujiwara no Koremichi (藤原伊通) (1093-1165)
- 1160-1164 Konoe Motozane (近衛基実) (1143-1166)
- 1164-1166 Matsudono Motofusa (松殿基房) (1144-1231)
- 1166-1189 Fujiwara no Tsunemune (藤原経宗) (1119-1189)

=== Kamakura period ===
- 1189-1190 Tokudaiji Sanesada (徳大寺実定) (1139-1192)
- 1190-1196 Sanjō Sanefusa (三条実房) (1147-1225)
- 1198-1199 Fujiwara no Kanemasa (藤原兼雅) (1148-1200)
- 1199-1204 Kujō Yoshitsune (九条良経) (1169-1206)
- 1204-1207 Konoe Iezane (近衛家実) (1179-1243)
- 1207-1211 Fujiwara no Takatada (藤原隆忠) (1163-1245)
- 1211-1218 Kujō Yoshisuke (九条良輔) (1185-1218)
- 1218-1221 Kujō Michiie (九条道家) (1193-1252)
- 1221-1224 Konoe Iemichi (近衛家通) (1204-1224)
- 1225-1227 Tokudaiji Kintsugu (徳大寺公継) (1175-1227)
- 1227-1231 Kujō Yoshihira (九条良平) (1184-1240)
- 1231-1235 Kujō Norizane (九条教実) (1211-1235)
- 1235-1238 Konoe Kanetsune (近衛兼経) (1210-1259)
- 1238-1244 Nijō Yoshizane (二条良実) (1216-1271)
- 1244-1247 Ichijō Sanetsune (一条実経) (1223-1284) (first time)
- 1247-1252 Takatsukasa Kanehira (鷹司兼平) (1228-1294)
- 1252-1259 Nijō Michinaga (二条道良) (1234-1259)
- 1259-1261 Saionji Kinsuke (西園寺公相) (1223-1267)
- 1261-1263 Tōin Saneo (洞院実雄) (1219-1273)
- 1263-1265 Ichijō Sanetsune (一条実経) (1223-1284) (second time)
- 1265-1268 Konoe Motohira (近衛基平) (1246-1268)
- 1269 Takatsukasa Mototada (鷹司基忠) (1247-1313)
- 1269-1275 Ichijō Ietsune (一条家経) (1248-1294)
- 1276-1288 Nijō Morotada (二条師忠) (1254-1341)
- 1288-1292 Kujō Tadanori (九条忠教) (1248-1332)
- 1292-1297 Takatsukasa Kanetada (鷹司兼忠) (1262-1301)
- 1297-1299 Nijō Kanemoto (二条兼基) (1267-1334)
- 1299-1306 Kujō Moronori (九条師教) (1273-1320)
- 1306-1309 Takatsukasa Fuyuhira (鷹司冬平) (1275-1327)
- 1309 Saionji Kinhira (西園寺公衡) (1264-1315)
- 1309-1314 Konoe Iehira (近衛家平) (1282-1324)
- 1314-1316 Nijō Michihira (二条道平) (1287-1335)
- 1316-1318 Konoe Tsunehira (近衛経平) (1287-1318)
- 19 September 1318 - 22 September 1322 Tōin Saneyasu (洞院実泰)
- 22 September 1322 - 17 July 1323 Kujō Fusazane (九条房実)
- 18 July 1323 - 20 May 1324 Tōin Saneyasu (洞院実泰)
- 20 May 1324 - 9 March 1331 Takatsukasa Fuyunori (鷹司冬教)
- 9 March 1331 - 29 June 1333 Konoe Mototsugu (近衛基嗣)

=== Kenmu Restoration ===
- 29 June 1333 - 27 February 1335 Nijō Michihira (二条道平)
- 11 March 1335 - 4 December 1335 Takatsukasa Fuyunori (鷹司冬教)
- 4 December 1335 - 1351 Konoe Tsunetada (近衛経忠)

=== Southern Court ===
- 1351-? Tōin Kinkata (洞院公賢)
- ?-22 September 1358 Tōin Saneyo (洞院実世)
- ?-? Nijō Fuyuzane (二条冬実)

=== Muromachi Period ===
- 8 August 1337 - 26 January 1340 Ichijō Tsunemichi (一条経通)
- 26 January 1340 - 29 November 1342 Kujō Michinori (九条道教)
- 4 May 1343 - 30 June 1346 Tōin Kinkata (洞院公賢)
- 20 October 1347 - 25 October 1349 Nijō Yoshimoto (二条良基)
- 25 October 1349 - 9 November 1360 Kujō Tsunenori (九条経教)
- 9 November 1360 - 21 October 1362 Konoe Michitsugu (近衛道嗣)
- 12 January 1363 - 3 December 1369 Takatsukasa Fuyumichi (鷹司冬通)
- 12 April 1370 - 11 December 1375 Nijō Moroyoshi (二条師良)
- 11 December 1375 - 19 September 1378 Kujō Tadamoto (九条忠基)
- 19 September 1378 - 9 February 1382 Nijō Morotsugu (二条師嗣)
- 9 February 1382 - 30 June 1388 Ashikaga Yoshimitsu (足利義満)
- 30 June 1388 - 7 February 1393 Tokudaiji Sanetoki (徳大寺実時)
- 7 February 1393 - 22 October 1393 Ashikaga Yoshimitsu (足利義満)
- 3 July 1394 - 26 April 1395 Ichijō Tsunetsugu (一条経嗣)
- 26 April 1395 - 23 June 1395 Imadegawa Kinnao (今出川公直)
- 5 August 1395 - before 13 September 1395 Yotsutsuji Yoshinari (四辻善成)
- 27 August 1396 - 1399 Tōin Kinsada (洞院公定)
- 29 March 1399 - 19 September 1402 Sanjō Sanefuyu (三条実冬)
- 19 September 1402 - 3 February 1409 Konoe Tadatsugu (近衛忠嗣)
- 6 April 1409 - 21 January 1411 Nijō Mitsumoto (二条満基)
- 3 May 1411 - 28 December 1418 Imadagawa Kinyuki (今出川公行)
- 28 December 1418 - 1419 Kujō Mitsunori (九条満教)
- 21 December 1419 - 26 February 1420 Tokudaiji Kintoshi (徳大寺公俊)
- 26 February 1420 - 1425 Nijō Mochimoto (二条持基)
- 1427 - 2 September 1429 Nijō Mochimoto (二条持基)
- 2 September 1429 - 22 September 1432 Ichijō Kaneyoshi (一条兼良)
- 22 September 1432 - 17 September 1438 Ashikaga Yoshinori (足利義教)
- 22 September 1438 - 8 May 1446 Konoe Fusatsugu (近衛房嗣)
- 24 May 1446 - 1455 Takatsukasa Fusahira (鷹司房平)
- 8 October 1455 - 4 May 1457 Tōin Sanehiro (洞院実熙)
- 8 July 1457 - 1 January 1460 Ichijō Norifusa (一条教房)
- 1 January 1460 - 13 August 1460 Sanjō Sanekazu (三条実量)
- 11 September 1460 - 29 September 1467 Ashikaga Yoshimasa (足利義政)

=== Sengoku Period ===
- 4 February 1468 - 17 March 1475 Nijō Masatsugu (二条政嗣)
- 15 April 1475 - 7 June 1476 Kujō Masamoto (九条政基)
- 7 June 1476 - 14 July 1476 Hino Katsumitsu (日野勝光)
- 15 September 1476 - 17 April 1479 Takatsukasa Masahira (鷹司政平)
- 10 May 1479 - December 1481 or January 1482 Konoe Masaie (近衛政家)
- 16 January 1482 - January or February 1483 Imadegawa Norisue (今出川教季)
- 7 February 1483 - 1487 Saionji Sanetō (西園寺実遠)
- 16 September 1487 - 11 May 1493 Tokudaiji Saneatsu (徳大寺実淳)
- 15 May 1493 - 19 December 1496 Kazan'in Masanaga (花山院政長)
- 6 January 1497 - 27 May 1497 Konoe Hisamichi (近衛尚通)
- 27 May 1497 - 28 March 1505 Imadegawa Kin'oki (今出川公興)
- 27 February 1506 - 1 November 1513 Kujō Hisatsune (九条尚経)
- 3 November 1513 - 31 August 1514 Konoe Hisamichi (近衛尚通)
- 29 April 1515 - 29 May 1518 Takatsukasa Kanesuke (鷹司兼輔)
- 5 July 1518 - 2 August 1521 Sanjō Saneka (三条実香)
- 2 August 1521 - 18 March 1523 Nijō Tadafusa (二条尹房)
- 25 March 1523 - October or November 1526 Tokudaiji Kintane (徳大寺公胤)
- 3 September 1528 - 2 January 1536 Konoe Taneie (近衛稙家)
- 21 January 1538 - 20 December 1540 Saionji Sanenobu (西園寺実宣)
- 7 February 1541 - 16 April 1542 Takatsukasa Tadafuyu (鷹司忠冬)
- 17 April 1542 - 28 February 1546 Ichijō Fusamichi (一条房通)
- 2 March 1546 - 25 April 1546 Sanjō Kinyori (三条公頼)
- 26 April 1546 - 5 March 1547 Imadegawa Kinhiko (今出川公彦)
- 8 March 1547 - 12 January 1553 Nijō Haruyoshi (二条晴良)
- 8 February 1553 - 4 March 1554 Ichijō Kanefuyu (一条兼冬)
- 12 May 1554 - 24 September 1557 Konoe Sakihisa (近衛前久)
- 24 September 1557 - 8 April 1576 Saionji Kintomo (西園寺公朝)

=== Azuchi-Momoyama Period ===
- 10 December 1576 - 29 December 1577 Kujō Kanetaka (九条兼孝)
- 29 December 1577 - January 1585 Ichijō Uchimoto (一条内基)
- January 1585 - 9 April 1585 Nijō Akizane (二条昭実)
- 9 April 1585 - 11 March 1592 Konoe Nobutada (近衛信尹)
- 11 March 1592 - 13 August 1595 Toyotomi Hidetsugu (豊臣秀次)

=== Edo Period ===
- 18 January 1601 - 1 March 1601 Kujō Kanetaka (九条兼孝)
- 2 March 1601 - 6 September 1605 Konoe Nobutada (近衛信尹)
- 19 December 1605 - 31 January 1609 Takatsukasa Nobufusa (鷹司信房)
- 13 April 1612 - 22 February 1614 Kujō Yukiie (九条幸家)
- 22 February 1614 - 16 February 1620 Takatsukasa Nobuhisa (鷹司信尚)
- 16 February 1620 - 19 August 1629 Konoe Nobuhiro (近衛信尋)
- 26 October 1629 - 2 February 1633 Ichijō Akiyoshi (一条昭良)
- 2 February 1633 - 6 February 1633 Kazan'in Sadahiro (花山院定煕)
- 6 February 1633 - 7 February 1638 Nijō Yasumichi (二条康道)
- 11 May 1640 - 1 January 1642 Takatsukasa Norihira (鷹司教平)
- 17 February 1642 - 3 February 1648 Kujō Michifusa (九条道房)
- 21 August 1648 - 5 September 1652 Konoe Hisatsugu (近衛尚嗣)
- 17 October 1652 - 28 May 1658 Nijō Mitsuhira (二条光平)
- 23 February 1660 - 29 April 1661 Sanjō Sanehide (三条実秀)
- 20 June 1661 - 19 February 1663 Kazan'in Sadayoshi (花山院定好)
- 19 February 1663 - 10 April 1667 Takatsukasa Fusasuke (鷹司房輔)
- 30 April 1667 - 5 July 1668 Saionji Saneharu (西園寺実晴)
- 6 October 1668 - 3 January 1670 Tokudaiji Kinnobu (徳大寺公信)
- 25 May 1670 - 7 June 1671 Ōinomikado Tsunetaka (大炊御門経孝)
- 13 June 1671 - 6 December 1677 Kujō Kaneharu (九条兼晴)
- 31 December 1677 - 24 January 1691 Konoe Motohiro (近衛基煕)
- 24 January 1691 - 14 February 1704 Takatsukasa Kanehiro (鷹司兼煕)
- 14 February 1704 - 15 February 1704 Ōinomikado Tsunemitsu (大炊御門経光)
- 15 February 1704 - 12 February 1708 Konoe Iehiro (近衛家煕)
- 12 February 1708 - 14 April 1715 Kujō Sukezane (九条輔実)

== See also ==
- Imperial Household Agency
- Kōkyū
- Kugyō
- List of Daijō-daijin
- Sesshō and Kampaku
