= Ministry of the Imperial Household =

701–1947 Japanese government office

Premodern Japan
- Part of a series on the politics and government of Japan during the Nara and Heian periods

Daijō-kan (Council of State)
- Chancellor / Chief minister: Daijō-daijin
- Minister of the Left: Sadaijin
- Minister of the Right: Udaijin
- Minister of the Center: Naidaijin
- Major Counselor: Dainagon
- Middle Counselor: Chūnagon
- Minor Counselor: Shōnagon

Eight Ministries
- Center: Nakatsukasa-shō
- Ceremonial: Shikibu-shō
- Civil Administration: Jibu-shō
- Popular Affairs: Minbu-shō
- War: Hyōbu-shō
- Justice: Gyōbu-shō
- Treasury: Ōkura-shō
- Imperial Household: Kunai-shō

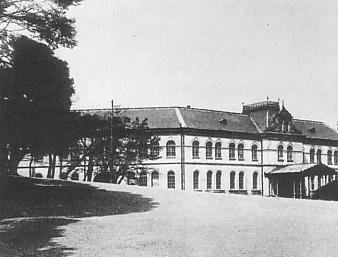
The Imperial Household Ministry in Meiji era

The Ministry of the Imperial Household (宮内省, Kunai-shō) was a division of the eighth century Japanese government of the Imperial Court in Kyoto, instituted in the Asuka period and formalized during the Heian period. The Ministry was reorganized in the Meiji period and existed until 1947, before being replaced by the Imperial Household Agency.

== Overview ==
The needs of the Imperial Household has changed over time. The ambit of the Ministry's activities encompassed, for example:

- supervision and maintenance of rice fields for the supply to the imperial family
- oversight of the harvesting done on the Imperial domains
- orchestrating the presentation to the Emperor of rare delicacies as gifts from his subjects
- administration of the culinary and engineering departments of the court
- regulation of breweries
- oversight of the court ladies
- oversight of court smiths
- management of court servants
- oversight of the Imperial wardrobe, etc.
- attending to the imperial princes and princesses of the second to the fourth generation, inclusive

== History ==
When this government agency was initially established in 645, it functioned as a tax collector on Imperial land. The organization and functions of the Imperial Household were refined and regulated in the Taihō Code, which was promulgated in 701–702 during the reign of Emperor Monmu. The fundamental elements of this system evolved over the course of centuries, but the basic structures remained in place until the Meiji Restoration.

This Ministry came to be responsible for everything to do with supporting the Emperor and the Imperial Family. Significant modifications were introduced in 1702, 1870, and 1889. It was reorganized into the Imperial Household Office (宮内府, Kunai-fu) in 1947, with its staff size was downscaled from 6,200 to less than 1,500, and the Office was placed under the Prime Minister. In 1949, the Imperial Household Office became the Imperial Household Agency (the current name), and placed under the fold of the newly created Prime Minister's Office (総理府, Sōri-fu), as an external agency attached to it.

In 2001, the Imperial Household Agency was organizationally re-positioned under the Cabinet Office (内閣府, Naikaku-fu).

== Hierarchy ==
The court developed a supporting bureaucracy which was exclusively focused on serving the needs of the Imperial Household . Among the ritsuryō officials within this ministry structure were:

- Chief administrator of the imperial household (宮内卿, Kunai-kyō), the surveyor of all works which are executed within the interior of the palace.
- First assistant to the chief of the imperial Household (宮内大輔, Kunai-taifu).
- Second assistant to the chief of the imperial household (宮内少輔, Kunai-shōbu), two persons.
- Third assistant to the chief of the imperial household (宮内丞, Kunai-no-jō), two persons
- Alternate assistants to the chief of the imperial household (宮内録, Kunai-no-sakan), two persons
- Chief steward of the imperial household (大膳大夫, Daizen-taifu)
- Chief steward of the imperial household (大膳亮, Daizen-no-suke)
- Assistant chief steward of the imperial household (大膳大進, 'Daizen-no-daishin), two positions
- Alternate assistant steward of the imperial household (大膳属, Daizen-no-sakan), two positions
- Chief carpenter/cabinet-maker (木工頭, Moku-no-kami)
- Assistant chief carpenter/cabinet-maker (木工助, Moku-no-suke)
- Master carpenters/cabinet-maker (木工允, Moku-no-jō), two positions
- Carpenter/cabinet-maker (木工属, Moku-no-sakan), two positions
- Chief estimator/adjustor (算師, Sanshi), An expert who evaluates the price/cost of work to be done or already completed
- Chief storekeeper/Palace kitchens manager (大炊頭, Ōi-no-kami) see Ōiryō (Bureau of the Palace Kitchen)
- First assistant storekeeper/Palace kitchens manager (大炊助, Ōi-no-suke)
- Second assistant storekeeper/Palace kitchens manager (大炊允, Ōi-no-jō)
- Alternate assistant storekeeper/Palace kitchens manager (大炊属, Ōi-no-sakan)
- Chief surveyor of apartments and furniture (主殿頭, Tonomo-no-kami)
- First assistant surveyor of apartments and furniture (主殿助, Tonomo-no-suke)
- Second assistant surveyor of apartments and furniture (主殿充, Tonomo-no-jō), two positions
- Alternate assistant surveyors of apartments and furniture (主殿属, Tonomo-no-sakan), two positions.
- Chief pharmacist (典薬頭, Ten'yaku-no-kami)
- First assistant to the chief pharmacist' (典薬助, Ten'yaku-no-suke)
- Second assistant to the chief pharmacist (典薬允, Ten'yaku-no-jō)
- Alternate assistant to the chief pharmacist (典薬属, Ten'yaku-no-sakan)
- Chief physician (医博士, I-hakase)
- Female physician (女医博士,, Nyo'i-hakase). No male physician would be permitted to care for the health of the emperor's women
- Chief acupuncturist (針博士, Shin-hakase)
- Emperor's personal physician (侍医, Ji'i)
- Emperor's second personal physician' (権侍医, Gon-no-ji'i)
- Emperor's alternate personal physician (医師, Ishi)
- Surveyor of housekeeping (掃部頭, Kamon-no-kami)
- First assistant surveyor of housekeeping (掃部助, Kamon-no-suke)
- Second assistant surveyor of housekeeping (掃部允, Kamon-no-jō)
- Alternate assistant surveyor of housekeeping (掃部属, Kamon-no-sakan)
- Chief genealogist of the imperial family (正親正,, Ōkimi-no-kami)
- First assistant to the chief genealogist (正親佑, Ōkimi-no-jō)
- Alternate assistant to the chief genealogist (正親令史, Ōkimi-no-sakan)
- First cupbearer to the Emperor (内膳正, Naizen-no-kami).
- Cupbearer to the Emperor (奉膳, Buzen)
- Assistant cupbearer (典膳, Tenzen)
- Alternate assistant cupbearer (内膳令史, Naizen-sakan)
- Chief sake maker (酒造正, Miki-no-kami)
- First assistant to the chief sake maker (酒造佑, Miki-no-jō)
- Alternate assistant to the chief sake maker (酒造令史, Miki-no-sakan)
- Surveyor of the Emperor's women (采女正, Uneme-no-kami)
- Assistant surveyor of the Emperor's women (采女佑, Uneme-no-jō)
- Alternate assistant surveyor of the Emperor's women (采女令史, Uneme-no-sakan)
- Head of the water supply bureau (主水正, Mondo-no-kami)
- First assistant to the head of the water supply bureau (主水佑, Mondo-no-jō)
- Alternate assistant to the head of the water supply bureau (主水令史, Mondo-no-sakan)

The deliberate redundancies at the top are features of each position in this remarkably stable hierarchic schema. Many positions would mirror the -kyō, -taifu, -shō, -jō, and -sakan pattern.

== See also ==
- Daijō-kan
