= Daijō-daijin =

Japanese Imperial court position

Premodern Japan
- Part of a series on the politics and government of Japan during the Nara and Heian periods

Daijō-kan (Council of State)
- Chancellor / Chief Minister: Daijō-daijin
- Minister of the Left: Sadaijin
- Minister of the Right: Udaijin
- Minister of the Center: Naidaijin
- Major Counselor: Dainagon
- Middle Counselor: Chūnagon
- Minor Counselor: Shōnagon

Eight Ministries
- Center: Nakatsukasa-shō
- Ceremonial: Shikibu-shō
- Civil Administration: Jibu-shō
- Popular Affairs: Minbu-shō
- War: Hyōbu-shō
- Justice: Gyōbu-shō
- Treasury: Ōkura-shō
- Imperial Household: Kunai-shō

The Daijō-daijin or Dajō-daijin (太政大臣; "Chancellor of the Realm") was the head of the Daijō-kan (Council of State) during and after the Nara period and briefly under the Meiji Constitution. It was equivalent to the Chinese Tàishī (太師), or Grand Preceptor.

== History ==
Emperor Tenji's favorite son, Prince Ōtomo, was the first to have been accorded the title of Daijō-daijin during the reign of his father. The Asuka Kiyomihara Code of 689 marks the initial appearance of the Daijō-Daijin in the context of a central administrative body composed of the three ministers: the Daijō-daijin (Chancellor), the Sadaijin (Minister of the Left), and the Udaijin (Minister of the Right). These positions were consolidated under the Code of Taihō in 702.

At a time when the Emperor and the nobility held real power, the Daijō-daijin was the highest position in the Daijō-kan, the central organ of the state. However, it was stipulated by law that no one could be appointed to this position if there was no suitable candidate, and the highest permanent position in the Daijō-kan was that of Sadaijin.

In the Nara period (710–794), the title of Daijō-daijin was basically a posthumous promotion. After the appointment of Fujiwara Yoshifusa in 857 of the Heian period (794–1185), it became an almost permanent position, although not legally permanent, and many members of the Fujiwara clan were appointed to the position. As the Fujiwara clan—which dominated the Sesshō and Kampaku regents—gained influence, the official government offices diminished in power. By the 10th century, Daijō-daijin had no power to speak of unless they were simultaneously Sesshō and Kampaku, or otherwise supported by the Fujiwara. Although the position continued in name until 1885, by the beginning of the 12th century, the office was essentially powerless, and was often vacant for lengthy periods.

By the 10th century, the position of Daijō-daijin had become an honorary position with no real authority, but it continued to be held by members of the high aristocratic class.

In 1167, Taira no Kiyomori established the first de facto samurai government and became Daijō-daijin. He was the first person to become Daijō-daijin despite being born into the warrior class. During the Kamakura period (1185-1333), high-ranking positions at the Daijō-kan, such as Sadaijin, and Udaijin, also became honorary titles bestowed by the emperor on members of the warrior class. At the time of Oda Nobunaga's appointment as Udaijin during the Azuchi–Momoyama period, the only members of the warrior class who had previously been appointed to imperial court posts higher than Udaijin were Taira no Kiyomori and Ashikaga Yoshimitsu as Daijō-daijin and Ashikaga Yoshinori and Ashikaga Yoshimasa as Sadaijin. Nobunaga was posthumously promoted to Daijō-daijin in 1582. Subsequently, Toyotomi Hideyoshi and Tokugawa Ieyasu were appointed Daijō-daijin.

This prominent office was briefly resurrected under the Meiji Constitution with the appointment of Sanjō Sanetomi in 1871, before being abolished completely in 1885 in favor of the newly created office of Prime Minister.

== Functions ==
The Chancellor presided over the Great Council of State, and controlled the officers of the state, in particular the Sadaijin and Udaijin, as well as four great councillors and three minor councillors. The ministers in turn controlled other elements of the government.

== See also ==
- Kugyō
- Kōkyū
- Kuge
- Imperial Household Agency
