= Ministry of War (pre-modern Japan) =

8th century Japanese government division

Premodern Japan
- Part of a series on the politics and government of Japan during the Nara and Heian periods

Daijō-kan (Council of State)
- Chancellor / Chief Minister: Daijō-daijin
- Minister of the Left: Sadaijin
- Minister of the Right: Udaijin
- Minister of the Center: Naidaijin
- Major Counselor: Dainagon
- Middle Counselor: Chūnagon
- Minor Counselor: Shōnagon

Eight Ministries
- Center: Nakatsukasa-shō
- Ceremonial: Shikibu-shō
- Civil Administration: Jibu-shō
- Popular Affairs: Minbu-shō
- War: Hyōbu-shō
- Justice: Gyōbu-shō
- Treasury: Ōkura-shō
- Imperial Household: Kunai-shō

The Ministry of War or Military Ministry (兵部省, Hyōbu-shō), sometimes called Tsuwamono no Tsukasa（都波毛乃乃都加佐）in Wago, was a division of the eighth century Japanese government of the Imperial Court in Kyoto, instituted in the Asuka period and formalized during the Heian period. The Ministry was replaced in the Meiji period.

== Overview ==
The highest-ranking official or head of the military (兵部卿,, Hyōbu-kyō) was ordinarily a son or a close relative of the Emperor. This important court officer was responsible for directing all military matters; and after the beginning in the late 12th century, this military man would have been empowered to work with the shogunate on the emperor's behalf.

The ambit of the Ministry's activities encompasses, for example:

- oversight of the rosters of military officers, including examinations, appointment, ranks, etc.
- dispatching of troops
- supervision of arsenals of weapons, guards, fortifications and signal fires
- maintenance of pastures, military horses, and public and private horses and cattle
- administration of postal stations
- control of the manufacture of weapons and weapon-makers
- oversight of drumming and in flute playing
- control of public and private means of water transportation
- regulation of the training of hawks and dogs.

== History ==
The ministry was established as part of the Taika Reforms and Ritsuryō laws which were initiated in the Asuka period and formalized during the Heian period. After 702, the Hyōbu-shō replaced the Hyōseikan, which was created in 683.

In the Edo period, titles associated with the ministry became ceremonial titles.

In the Meiji period, the hyōbu-shō was reorganized into a modern Ministry of War and Ministry of the Navy.

== Hierarchy ==
The Asuka-, Nara- and Heian-period Imperial court hierarchy encompassed a ministry dealing with military affairs.

In the 18th century, the top ritsuryō officials within this ministry structure were:

- Minister or chief official (兵部卿, Hyōbu-kyō), usually a son or a close relative of the Emperor.
- First assistant to the Minister (兵部大輔, Hyōbu-taifu).
- Second assistant to the Minister (兵部少輔, Hyōbu-shōfu).
- Senior staff officer (兵部大丞, Hyōbu-taijō).
- Junior staff officers (兵部少丞, Hyōbu-shōjō), two positions.
- Director of dance (隼人正, Hayato no kami), considered a very low rank.
- First assistant director (隼人佑, Hayato no jō).
- Alternate assistant director (隼人令史, Hayato no sakan).

== See also ==
- Daijō-kan
- Imperial Japanese Army (1871–1945)
- Imperial Japanese Navy (1871–1945)
- Japan Self-Defense Forces (1954–)
- Ministry of Defense (Japan)
