= Ministry of the Treasury =

Division of the eighth-century Japanese government

Premodern Japan
- Part of a series on the politics and government of Japan during the Nara and Heian periods

Daijō-kan (Council of State)
- Chancellor / Chief Minister: Daijō-daijin
- Minister of the Left: Sadaijin
- Minister of the Right: Udaijin
- Minister of the Center: Naidaijin
- Major Counselor: Dainagon
- Middle Counselor: Chūnagon
- Minor Counselor: Shōnagon

Eight Ministries
- Center: Nakatsukasa-shō
- Ceremonial: Shikibu-shō
- Civil Administration: Jibu-shō
- Popular Affairs: Minbu-shō
- War: Hyōbu-shō
- Justice: Gyōbu-shō
- Treasury: Ōkura-shō
- Imperial Household: Kunai-shō

The Ministry of the Treasury (大蔵省, Ōkura-shō; lit. 'the department of the great treasury') was a division of the eighth-century Japanese government of the Imperial Court in Kyoto, instituted in the Asuka period and formalized during the Heian period. The Ministry was replaced in the Meiji period.

== Overview ==
The nature of the ministry was modified in response to changing times. The ambit of the Ministry's activities encompasses, for example:

- administration of public accounts
- oversight of tax collections and of offerings to the Emperor
- regulation of weights and measures
- control of the functuations in prices of commodities
- regulation and oversight of the coinage of gold, silver, copper, and iron money
- maintenance of the lists of artisans engaged in coinage-related activities
- regulation of activities in the manufacture of lacquer ware, weaving, and other kinds of industries

== History ==
The duties, responsibilities and focus of the ministry evolved over time. It was established as part of the Taika Reforms and Ritsuryō laws. Since 1885, Ōkura-shō has been construed in reference to the Ministry of Finance, also called the Ōkura no Tsukasa.

== Hierarchy ==
The court included a ministry dealing with military affairs.

Amongst the significant daijō-kan officials serving in this ministry structure were:

- Chief administrator of the ministry of the treasury (大蔵卿, Ōkura-kyō). This official supervises the receipt of tributes from the provinces and imposes tribute on others.
- Chief administrator of the ministry of the treasury (大蔵大輔, Ōkura-taifu)
- First assistant to the chief of the ministry of the treasury (大蔵少輔, Ōkura-shō)
- Second assistant to the chief of the ministry of the treasury (大蔵丞, Ōkura-no-jō), two positions
- Alternate assistant to the chief of the ministry of the treasury (大蔵録, Ōkura-no-sakan), two positions
- Collector of taxation from manufacturers and dyers (織部正, Oribe-no-kami)
- Assistant collector of taxation from manufacturers and dyers (織部佑, Oribe-no-jō)
- Alternate assistant collector of taxation from manufacturers and dyers (織部令史, Oribe-no-sakan)

== See also ==
- Daijō-kan
- Ministry of Finance (Japan)
