= Shikibu-shō =

Premodern Japan
- Part of a series on the politics and government of Japan during the Nara and Heian periods

Daijō-kan (Council of State)
- Chancellor / Chief Minister: Daijō-daijin
- Minister of the Left: Sadaijin
- Minister of the Right: Udaijin
- Minister of the Center: Naidaijin
- Major Counselor: Dainagon
- Middle Counselor: Chūnagon
- Minor Counselor: Shōnagon

Eight Ministries
- Center: Nakatsukasa-shō
- Ceremonial: Shikibu-shō
- Civil Administration: Jibu-shō
- Popular Affairs: Minbu-shō
- War: Hyōbu-shō
- Justice: Gyōbu-shō
- Treasury: Ōkura-shō
- Imperial Household: Kunai-shō

The Ministry of Ceremonial Affairs (式部省, Shikibu-shō) was one of eight ministries of the Japanese imperial court. In wago, it is also called "Tsuri-no-Tsukasa"（乃利乃豆加佐）.

== History ==
It was established by the Taihō Code of early 8th century. The ministry was replaced in the Meiji period.

The ministry was renamed Mombushō for a brief number of years after 758, but the original name was restored in 764. The name has since remained unchanged until the Ritsuryō system was abandoned during the Meiji period.

Shikibu-shō is also where the Lady Murasaki Shikibu derives her name, probably owing to the senior secretary post that her father and her husband once occupied in the ministry. It is also the origin of the name of Shikike, one of the four great branches of the Fujiwara clan. In the Edo period, titles related to the Shikibu-shō, such as Shikibu-tayū (式部大輔), were largely ceremonial and could be held by non-kuge, such as daimyō lords.

Today's organisation is the Board of Ceremonies, a department of the Imperial Household Agency.

== Name ==
The "Ministry of Ceremonial," can arguably be considered the standard translation, as Japanologist Sir George Bailey Sansom wrote in 1932 that this was "the usual rendering in English", as well as being the coinage later adopted in the Appendix to Helen Craig McCullough's Eiga monogatari, which remains as the standard "followed by numerous English-language authors" according to a more recent assessment.

However, Sansom issued the caveat that the use of the word "ceremony" is potentially misleading. Its function is not purely ceremonial, as will be discussed under the #Functions section. Given the dilemma, some commentators have chosen to apply an English name that attempted at a description of the true function, rather than a faithful literal translation. Further discussion, and a compilation of the numerous alternate English names are given in the section #List of translated aliases.

== Functions ==
Sansom explains that Shiki actually denotes the "detailed procedure for the enforcement of ryō (the administrative code, as in Ritsuryō)". For this reason, applying "the word 'ceremonial' is a little misleading" he warns.

The minister, or the Shikibu-kyō (式部卿) had the grave authority to grade the performances of civil officers, recommend their appointments and awards, and decide on their ceremonial seniorities and privileges.

The ministry was also the supervisory body of the Daigaku-ryō (大学寮) or the State University, and also conducted the civil examinations (Imperial examination). (Note: Kawakami after Ito 1889, p. 86 n2 also name "(4)those relating to the appointment of stewards in the houses of Imperial Princes and in those of officials of and above the 3rd grade of rank; (5) those relating to pensions of all kinds and to donations;")

The other body it oversaw was San-i-ryō or Sanni-ryō (散位寮) or "Bureau of Scattered Ranks" which administrated officials of middling rank who had no specific appointments. Sansom called it the "Bureau of Court Ranks".

== Organisation ==
The Shikibu-shō (式部省) was headed by the minister, whose office was ordinarily filled by a son or close relative of the emperor, of the fourth grade or higher.

- Shikibu-kyō (式部卿) - "Minister of Ceremonial Affairs"

aliases: "Chief administrator of the ministry of civil services"

- Shikibu-no-tayū (式部大輔) - "Senior Assistant Minister of Ceremonial"

aliases: "Vice-Minister"

- Shikibu-no-shōyū (式部少輔) - "Junior Assistant Minister of Ceremonial"

aliases: "Junior Vice-Minister"

- Shikibu-no-daijō (式部大丞) (x 2) - "Senior Secretaries"

Sometimes concurrently held by a rokui-no-kurōdo (六位蔵人) "Chamberlain of sixth grade" who then gained special privilege to ascend to the imperial court.
When irregularly occupied by a fifth rank, it bears the aliases: Shikibu-no-jō-no-shaku (式部丞の爵) "A Secretary in the Ministry of Ceremonial who has been raised to the Fifth Rank"; Shikibu-no-jō-no-shaku (式部丞の爵); Shikibu-no-taifu (式部丞の爵) "Senior Secretary of the Fifth Rank".

- Shikibu-no-shōjō (式部少丞) (x 2) - "Junior Secretaries"
- Shikibu-dairoku or Shikibu-no-dai-sakan (式部大録) (x 1) - "Senior Recorder"
- Shikibu-shōroku or Shikibu-no-shō-sakan (式部少録) (x 3) - "Junior Recorders"
- Shishō (史生) (x 20) - "Scribes"
- Shōshō (省掌) (x 2) - "Office keepers"
- Shibu (使部) (x 80) - "Servants"

Under the Ministry were two bureaus. One was educational and called the Daigaku-ryō (大学寮), literally "Bureau of the Greater Learning" though often called "The Universities Bureau" or simply the "University". The other was the San-i-ryō or Sanni-ryō (散位寮) or "Bureau of Scattered Ranks".

== Office holders ==
=== Ministers ===
The Shikibu-kyō (式部卿) or Minister Fujiwara no Umakai (appointed <724), held this office, and the branch of the Fujiwara clan which he founded was named Shikke after him.

Prince Shigeakira (<943) held this office, which earned him the sobriquet Rihō Ō/Ribu Ō (吏部王) after the fancier name of the office written in Tang dynasty Chinese style. The same prince wrote a diary entitled The Rihō Ō ki (吏部王記)

=== Vice-ministers ===
Shikibu-no-tayū (式部大輔) Minamoto no Yasumitsu 969, though the man also nicknamed the Major Counselor of Momozono (桃園大納言) held numerous offices.

Shikibu-no-shōyū (式部少輔) The junior vice ministership was once held by Sugawara no Michizane 877, also known as the deified Tenjin.

=== Secretaries ===
Shikibu-no-daijō (式部大丞) The father of Lady Murasaki, Fujiwara no Tametoki (984) was appointed Senior Secretary. Minamoto no Tadataka (1004) who appears in Sei Shōnagon's The Pillow Book is another example.

As were Tametoki and Tadataka just mentioned, men who concurrently held Shikibu-no-daijō with another office of rokui-no-kurōdo (六位蔵人) "Chamberlain of sixth grade" gained special permission to ascend the court, and were addressed as Denjō no jō (殿上の丞) "

The Senior secretaryship was normally filled by a noble of Junior Sixth Rank, Lower Grade (正六位下), but occasionally a fifth rank candidate was appointed. Such an overqualified nobleman may be referred to as Shikibu-no-jō-no-shaku (式部丞の爵), with an example of the expression occurring in The Pillow Book, Things That Give a Vulgar Impression (146), as "A Secretary in the Ministry of Ceremonial who has been raised to the Fifth Rank" (Ivan Morris tr.) Such a nobleman is alternatively called a Shikibu-no-taifu (式部大夫), with instances in the Imakagami, Ōkagami, Genpei Jōsuiki as well as The Pillow Book, "Hateful Things (14)": "Senior Secretary of the Fifth Rank".

== List of translated aliases ==
Shikibu-shō has been rendered into English in numerous ways. These many aliases can for convenience's sake be categorized into either a "literal" translation camp or "semantic" translation camp, as Versucher (2008) has suggested in a review article:

"In general, authors writing in English translate Japanese offices either literally, like “Ministry of Rites” (sic. (Note: Verschuer misquotes it as "Ministry of Rites;" because the source she explicitly cites, McCullough & McCullough 1980, pp. 789–831, volume 2, Appendix A gives on p.808 "The Ministry of Ceremonial (Shikibushō)".)) for Shikibushô (McCullough and McCullough), or semantically, like “Ministry of Personnel” for the same Shikibushô (Joan Piggott, The Emergence of Japanese Kingship, Stanford University Press, 1997)."

Versucher's article quoted above notes that the translations of medieval Japanese offices appended in Helen Craig McCullough and her husband's translation of Eiga monogatari are "followed by numerous English-language authors", and the McCulloughs translate Shikibu-shō as "Ministry of Ceremonial".

literal

- Bureau of Ceremonials
- Ceremonial Department
- Department of Ceremonial
- Department of Ceremonial (or Rites)
- Department of Rites and Ceremonies
- Ceremonies Ministry
- Ministry of Ceremonial
- Ministry of Ceremonials
- Ministry of Ceremony
- Ministry of Ceremonies
- Ministry of Rites

semantic

- Department of Civil Affairs and Education
- Ministry of Civil Administration
- Ministry of Civil Services
- Ministry of Personnel

== See also ==
- Daijō-kan
