= Kuge =

Japanese aristocratic class

公家
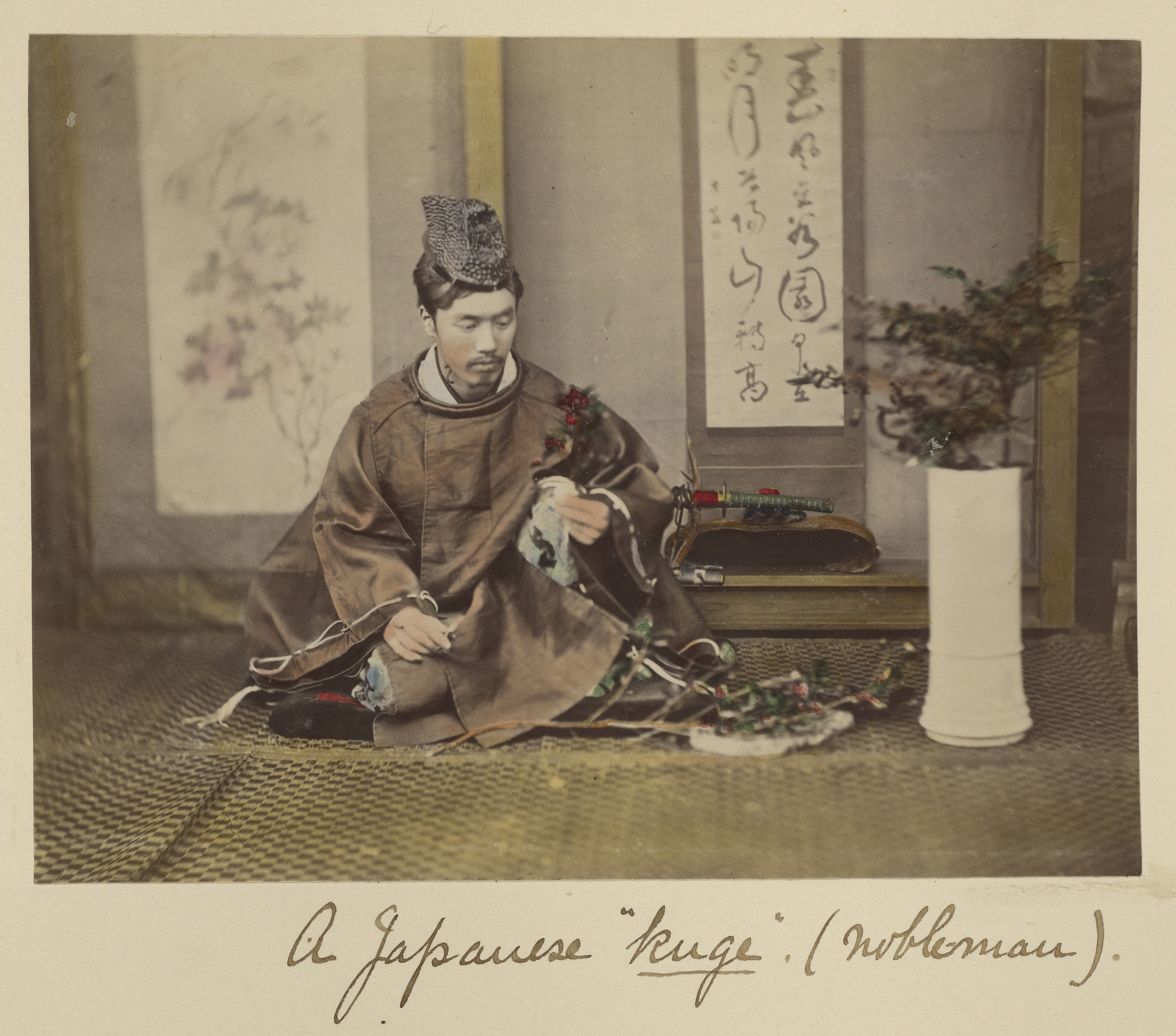
- A kuge in 1873

Regions with significant populations
- Japan

The kuge (公家; Japanese pronunciation: [kɯ.ɡe, -ŋe]) was a Japanese aristocratic class that dominated the Japanese Imperial Court in Kyoto. The kuge were important from the establishment of Kyoto as the capital during the Heian period in the late 8th century until the rise of the Kamakura shogunate in the 12th century, at which point it was eclipsed by the bushi. The kuge still provided a weak court around the Emperor until the Meiji Restoration, when they merged with the daimyō, regaining some of their status in the process, and formed the kazoku (peerage), which lasted until the Japanese peerage system was abolished with the 1947 constitution. Though there is no longer an official status, members of the kuge families remain influential in Japanese society, government, and industry.

== History ==
Kuge (from Middle Chinese kuwng-kæ 公家, "ducal family", or "nobility" in a pre–peerage context) originally described the Emperor and his court. The meaning of the word changed over time to designate bureaucrats at the court. During the Heian period, the relative peace and stability provided freedom for the noble class to pursue cultural interests, and the kuge became leaders and benefactors of arts and culture in Japan. Most of the kuge resided in the capital city of Kyoto.

Later in the Kamakura period (1185–1333), kuge became an antonym to buke (warrior nobles), that is, samurai who swore loyalty to the shogunate. At this point, kuge began to be used to describe those who worked in the Court; both aristocratic noblemen and commoners.

Two classes formed the kuge: the dōjō (堂上) noblemen who sat on the floor with the Emperor; and the jige (地下) who were unable to sit with the Emperor. Although kuge included those two classes, mainly this word described the dōjō, the noblemen.

The highest offices at the court were called kugyō and eligibility was limited to members of dōjō kuge. During the Edo period there were about 130 families of dōjō kuge. The most prominent members of the kuge became regents to the emperor (sesshō or kampaku). These daijō-kan offices were restricted to members of the Fujiwara family.

Though they lost most of their political power, they sustained the court culture and maintained a cultural influence. In particular, after the Sengoku period they lost most of their financial basis and were no longer in a position to act as patrons of culture, but they passed on their knowledge as masters of particular fields such as writing waka poetry and playing instruments such as the biwa, and they had disciples among the daimyō and sometimes rich commoners. As masters of a certain field, kuge gave their disciples many licenses certifying that the disciples had learned a certain field and allowed them to perform in public or sometimes to teach others. Disciples were expected to pay their master a fee for each issued license. During the Edo period, this was an important source of income for the kuge.

In 1869 during the Meiji Restoration the kuge merged with the daimyō to form a single aristocratic group, the kazoku.

Others associated with the kuge included Buddhist priests, Kyoto cultural patrons, geisha, and actors.

== Classification ==
The kuge were divided into two classes, the higher dōjō and the lower jige. In the 12th century conventional differences were established among the dōjō, separating them into groups according to their office at court. These determined the highest office to which they could be appointed. Within the dōjō class, the groupings were:

1. Sekke (摂家): could be appointed as Sesshō and Kampaku: This was the highest class of kuge. Only five families belonged to this class, all descended from Fujiwara no Michinaga.
2. Seigake (清華家): could be appointed daijin (minister), including daijō-daijin (chancellor), the highest of the four ministers of the court. They were descended from the Fujiwara clan or Minamoto clan, descendants of the emperors.
3. Daijinke (大臣家): could be appointed naidaijin, if this office became vacant. In reality, the highest office they could normally achieve was dainagon.
4. Urinke (羽林家): was a military class; they could be appointed dainagon or rarely to naidaijin.
5. Meika (名家; also pronounced "Meike"): was a civilian class; they could also be appointed dainagon.
6. Hanke (半家): was the lowest class among the dōjō, created in the late Sengoku period. They could only be appointed to lower ranks than sangi or chūnagon.

The jige class was associated with but not a part of the dōjō:

- Jigeke (地下家):This class is not a part of all the classes above. Their status is lower than Hanke and they may not enter certain important places in the imperial palace. They are in charge of miscellaneous business in the palace such as cooking and sanitary services. Like other kuge classes, their positions and ranks in the imperial court are hereditary.

Most of the highest-classed kuge belonged to the Fujiwara clan and Minamoto clan, but there were still other clans like the Sugawara clan, the Kiyohara clan, and the Ōe clan.

== See also ==
- List of Kuge families
