= Ministry of the Center =

Premodern Japan
- Part of a series on the politics and government of Japan during the Nara and Heian periods

Daijō-kan (Council of State)
- Chancellor / Chief Minister: Daijō-daijin
- Minister of the Left: Sadaijin
- Minister of the Right: Udaijin
- Minister of the Center: Naidaijin
- Major Counselor: Dainagon
- Middle Counselor: Chūnagon
- Minor Counselor: Shōnagon

Eight Ministries
- Center: Nakatsukasa-shō
- Ceremonial: Shikibu-shō
- Civil Administration: Jibu-shō
- Popular Affairs: Minbu-shō
- War: Hyōbu-shō
- Justice: Gyōbu-shō
- Treasury: Ōkura-shō
- Imperial Household: Kunai-shō

The Ministry of the Center (中務省, Nakatsukasa-shō) (lit. the department of the inner (or privy) affairs) was a division of the eighth century Japanese government of the Imperial Court in Kyoto, instituted in the Asuka period and formalized during the Heian period. The Ministry was replaced in the Meiji period. In Wago, it is also called "Naka-no-Matsurigoto-no-Tsukasa(奈加乃萬豆利古止乃豆加佐)".

== Overview ==
This ministry encompassed those of the Imperial Household whose functions brought them closest to the emperor. The ceremonies of the Imperial Household evolved over time. Among those holding the highest office in the Imperial Household ministry was Takaharu-shinnō, who would later become Emperor Go-Daigo.

== History ==
The ceremonial nature of the Imperial Household has changed over time. The Ministry was established in 649 as a liaison between the Daijō-kan and the Emperor.

The ambit of the Ministry's activities encompasses, for example:

- attendance upon the Emperor, including advice to him on his personal matters, supporting him in the maintenance of a proper dignity and helping him in the observance of proper forms of etiquette
- assisting in the inspection and countersigning of drafts of Imperial Rescripts
- making of representations to the Emperor
- support in the issuance of imperial orders in time of war
- monitoring the reception of addresses to the Emperor
- compilation of the history of the country
- maintenance of the records relating to the gazetteer
- maintenance of the records relating to the personal status of imperial princesses from the second to the fourth generation
- maintenance of the records relating to the maids of honour and other court ladies
- oversight of the submission to the Emperor of the census of the population in the various provinces
- oversight of the submission to the Emperor of the accounts of the taxes to be levied
- oversight of the submission to the Emperor of the lists of the priests and nuns in the provinces
- assistance relating to the Grand Empress Dowager, the Empress Dowager, and the Empress
- supervision of the Imperial archives
- administration of the annual expenditure of the court and to various articles to be provided for the use of the Imperial family
- supervision of the astronomical calculations and the arrangement of the calendar
- oversight of the pictorial artists at court
- regulation of medicaments to be supplied to the Emperor and the medical advice to be given him
- maintenance of order in the palace

== Hierarchy ==
Amongst the significant Daijō-kan officials within this ministry structure were:

- Minister or chief administrator of the Ministry of the Center (中務卿, Nakatsukasa-kyō). After the 11th century, this position in the Imperial court was always an Imperial prince. This official oversees the inspection of the interior apartments of the palace; and he is granted the privilege of retaining his swords in the presence of the emperor.
- First assistant to the Minister (中務大輔, Nakatsukasa-taifu).
- Second assistant to the Minister (中務少輔, Nakatsukasa-shō).
- Third assistant to the Minister (中務大丞, Nakatsukasa dai-shō).
- Fourth assistant to the Minister' (中務少丞, Nakatsukasa shō-shō).
- Emperor's equerries (侍従, Jijū), 8 positions. There are 8 officials with this title, all equal in rank and in the confidence of the Emperor.
- Ministerial equerries (内舎人, Udoneri), 90 positions. There are 90 officials with this title; and when a sesshō becomes a kampaku, these men function under his orders. If the emperor is still a child, or if a woman occupies the throne, a sessho is chosen to represent the emperor; and the kampaku is considered first amongst all others in Japan. Then the Shōgun cannot undertake anything of importance without his approval. When the emperor governs directly on his own, the Udoneri may be by-passed.
- Chief draftsman and editor (大内記, Dai-naiki).
- Assistant draftsmen and editors (少内記, Shō-naiki). These officials must be very well versed in the affairs of China and Japan: and they edit or re-draft all of the emperor's edicts, rescripts, memorials and letters. For this kind of work, only men of the highest merit and distinction are chosen.
- Drafting clerks (監物, Kenmotsu).
- Chief surveyor of palace apartments (中宮大夫, Chūgū-daibu).
- Assistant surveyor of palace apartments (中宮権大夫, Chūgū-gon-no-daibu).
- Majordomo of the palace (内舎人頭, Udoneri-no-kami).
- Chief curator of the palace (内蔵頭, Kura-no-kami).
- Assistant curator of the palace (内蔵権頭, Kura-no-gon-no-kami).
- Chief court tailor (縫殿頭, Nui no kami).
- Chief court astrologer (陰陽頭, On'yō-no-kami) -- see Onmyōdō.
- Chief court calendar-maker (暦博士, Reki-hakase).
- Chief court astronomer (天文博士, 'Tenmon-hakase).
- Chief court time-keeper (漏刻博士, Rōkoku-hakase).
- Chief court architect (内匠頭, Takumi-no- kami).

In the Meiji period, a variant equerry was introduced as part of the Imperial retinue. As explained in an excerpt from the 113th Imperial decree of 1896 (Meiji 29) (明治29年勅令第113号):

"Aides-de-camp to the Emperor of Japan (侍従武官, jijū bukan) will perform attendant duties and will relay to him military matters and orders, be present at military reviews [in his name] and accompanying him to formal ceremonies and interviews."

== See also ==
- Daijō-kan
