= Ministry of Ceremonies (Japan) =

Premodern Japan
- Part of a series on the politics and government of Japan during the Nara and Heian periods

Daijō-kan (Council of State)
- Chancellor / Chief Minister: Daijō-daijin
- Minister of the Left: Sadaijin
- Minister of the Right: Udaijin
- Minister of the Center: Naidaijin
- Major Counselor: Dainagon
- Middle Counselor: Chūnagon
- Minor Counselor: Shōnagon

Eight Ministries
- Center: Nakatsukasa-shō
- Ceremonial: Shikibu-shō
- Civil Administration: Jibu-shō
- Popular Affairs: Minbu-shō
- War: Hyōbu-shō
- Justice: Gyōbu-shō
- Treasury: Ōkura-shō
- Imperial Household: Kunai-shō

The Ministry of Civil Administration (治部省, Jibu-shō) (lit. the department of governance affairs) was a division of the eighth century Japanese government of the Imperial Court in Kyoto), and it is sometimes identified as the "Ministry of the Interior".

== History ==
It was instituted as part of the Taika Reforms and Ritsuryō laws in the Asuka period and formalized during the Heian period. It was previously called Osamuru-tsukasa. The ministry was replaced in the Meiji period. Today the Board of Ceremonies (宮内庁式部職; Shikibu shoku) of the Imperial Household Agency is the successor.

== Overview ==
The ministry was organized to address the ceremonial aspects of the Imperial year, to manage the ceremonial nature of formal relations with China, Korea, and other nations, and to oversee the maintenance of Imperial tombs and mausoleums. The ceremonies of the Imperial Household evolved over time.

The ambit of the Ministry's activities encompasses, for example:

- maintenance of the roster of names of officials
- oversight of the succession and marriage of officials of and above the fifth grade of rank
- oversight of formalities relating to deaths, funerals and the granting of posthumous rank
- management of the memorial activities which honor the anniversaries of the demise of a former Emperor
- monitoring and recording of the names of all the former Emperors, so that none of those names shall be used by any of the succeeding Emperors nor by any subject
- adjudication of disputes about the order of precedence of the various families
- supervision of all matters relating to the music
- registration of names of Buddhistic temples, priests and nuns
- reception and entertainment of foreigners and managing to their presentation to the Emperor
- maintenance of the imperial sepulchers (misasagi) and royal burial mounds (kofun), including oversight of those in attendance upon them.

This ministry was also responsible for rules for noble families above the fifth rank.

== Hierarchy ==
The top ritsuryō officials within this ministry structure were:

- Chief administrator of the ministry of ceremonies (治部卿,, Jibu-kyō).
- First assistant to the Minister (治部大輔, Jibu-taifu).
- Second assistant to the Minister (治部少輔, Jibu-shō)
- Third assistant to the Minister (治部大丞, Jibu-dai-shō)
- Fourth assistant to the Minister (治部少丞, Jibu-shō-shō)
- Senior undersecretary (治部大録, Jibu-no-dai-sakan)
- Alternate undersecretary (治部少録, Jibu-no-shō-sakan)
- Chief court musician (雅楽頭, Uta-no-kami)
- First assistant musician (雅楽助, Uta-no-suke)
- Second assistant musician (雅楽允, Uta-no-jō).
- Alternate musicians (雅楽属, Uta-no-sakan), two positions
- Chief interpreter/diplomat (玄蕃頭, Genba-no-kami). This official is charged with receiving ambassadors from China and Korea and serving as interpreters for them.
- First assistant interpreter/diplomat (玄蕃介, Genba-no-suke)
- Second assistant interpreter/diplomat (玄蕃允, Genba-no-jō), two positions
- Alternate interpreter/diplomat (玄蕃属, Genba-no-sakan), two positions
- Chief inspector of imperial tombs (諸陵頭, Shoryō-no-kami), two positions
- First assistant inspector (諸陵助, Shoryō-no-suke), two positions
- Second assistant inspector (諸陵允, Shoryō-no-jō), two positions
- Alternate inspectors (諸陵属, Shoryō-no-sakan), two positions

== See also ==
- Daijō-kan
- Ministry of Ceremonies (Han dynasty)
