= Ministry of Justice (pre-modern Japan) =

Premodern Japan
- Part of a series on the politics and government of Japan during the Nara and Heian periods

Daijō-kan (Council of State)
- Chancellor / Chief Minister: Daijō-daijin
- Minister of the Left: Sadaijin
- Minister of the Right: Udaijin
- Minister of the Center: Naidaijin
- Major Counselor: Dainagon
- Middle Counselor: Chūnagon
- Minor Counselor: Shōnagon

Eight Ministries
- Center: Nakatsukasa-shō
- Ceremonial: Shikibu-shō
- Civil Administration: Jibu-shō
- Popular Affairs: Minbu-shō
- War: Hyōbu-shō
- Justice: Gyōbu-shō
- Treasury: Ōkura-shō
- Imperial Household: Kunai-shō

The Ministry of Justice (刑部省, Gyōbu-shō; lit. "department of penal affairs") was a division of the eighth century Japanese government of the Imperial Court in Kyoto, instituted in the Asuka period and formalized during the Heian period. The Ministry was replaced in the Meiji period.

== Overview ==
The nature of the ministry was modified in response to changing times. The ambit of the Gyōbu-shō activities encompassed, for example:

- administration and conduct of trials
- oversight of the determination of the severity of punishments
- regulation of the imposition of fines, imprisonments, and penal servitude

== History ==
The duties, responsibilities and focus of the ministry evolved over time. The ritsuryō system of laws were interpreted and applied by bureaucracies which distinguished punishment (gyōbushō) and censorship (danjodai). These were merged in 1871 when the Ministry of Justice (司法省, shihōshō) was established under the Constitution of the Empire of Japan.

== Hierarchy ==
The Ministry of Justice brought together a judiciary and penal system management.

The top ritsuryō officials within this ministry structure were:

- chief administrator of the Ministry of Justice (刑部卿, Gyōbu-kyō)
- First assistant to the chief of the Ministry of Justice (刑部大輔, Gyōbu-taifu)
- Second assistant to the chief of the Ministry of Justice (刑部少輔, Gyōbu-shō)
- Senior Ministry of Justice undersecretary (刑部丞, Gyōbu-no-jō)
- Alternate of the Ministry of Justice undersecretary (刑部録, Gyōbu-no-sakan), two positions
- Chief judge (大判事, Dai-hanji). There are three classes of officials under the control of the chief judge
- First assistants to the Chief Judge (中判事, Chū-hanji)
- Second assistants to the Chief Judge (少判事, Shō-hanji)
- Alternate assistants to the Chief Judge (判事属, Hanji-no-sakan)
- Chief prison warden (囚獄正, Shūgoku-no-kami)
- First assistant prison warden (囚獄佑, Shūgoku-no-jō)
- Alternate assistant prison warden (囚獄令史, Shūgoku-no-sakan)

== See also ==
- Daijō-kan
