= Historiography of Japan =

The historiography of Japan (日本史学史 Nihon shigakushi) is the study of methods and hypotheses formulated in the study and literature of the history of Japan.

The earliest work of Japanese history is attributed to Prince Shōtoku, who is said to have written the Tennōki and the Kokki in 620 CE. The earliest extant work is the Kojiki of 712. The Nihon Shoki followed by 720. These two works formed the base of a history of the nation based in great part on Japanese mythology, in particular that of the Shinto religion. The works were inspired by Chinese historiography and were compiled with the support of the Japanese state. Five more works between 797 and 901 completed what had begun with the Nihon Shoki; the six are known as the Rikkokushi ("six national histories").

An abandonment of Chinese inspiration and state support marks the historiographical writings of the period from the 9th to 16th centuries. A great number of historical tales called rekishi monogatari and war tales called gunki monogatari appeared, and works such as the shikyō "four mirrors" of the 12th to 14th centuries and The Tale of the Heike of 1371 enjoyed widespread popularity. Other art forms such as Noh theatre and emaki scrolls added to these written works.

Neo-Confucian schools became preeminent at the beginning of the Edo period (1603–1868). They brought a methodology very critical of works such as the Kojiki, but did not contradict the Mandate of Heaven. The most prominent representatives of this are the Hayashi clan and the Mitogaku school. The nativist kokugaku school, inspired by Shinto, returned in the 18th century, driven by the work of Motoori Norinaga. It opposed the Neo-Confucians by seeking to demonstrate the veracity of Shinto mythology, especially of the Age of the Gods and the early emperors, whose existence is doubted.

Japanese historiography opened to Western influences at the end of the 18th century. Rangaku ("Dutch learning"), translations of European works in the mid-19th century, and then the introduction of German historiography of Ludwig Riess in 1887 brought new analytical tools to the various Japanese schools of history. During the period of the Empire of Japan (1868–1947), historians questioned, at the peril of their academic freedom, one of the ideological foundations of the new regime: the place of national myths in the national history.

Marxist ideas were introduced in the 1920s and renewed in the post-World War II period with the work of Hisao Ōtsuka. Themes and research diversified from the 1970s, soon accompanied by a resurgence of conservative and nationalist approaches.

== Beginnings through the Middle Ages ==
=== Earliest chronicles to the Nihon Shoki ===
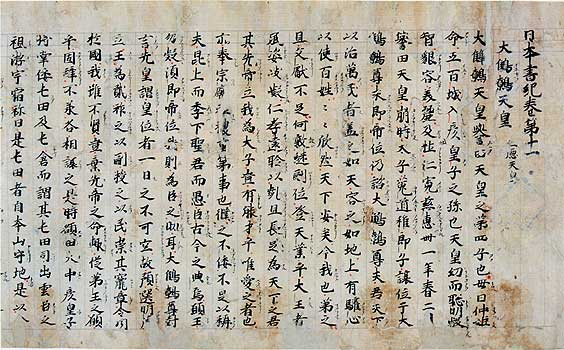
The Nihon Shoki of 720, one of the earliest texts tracing the history of Japan

The earliest extant works aiming to present the History of Japan appeared in the 8th century CE. The Kojiki of 712 and the Nihon Shoki of 720 looked to similar Chinese models, at a time when Chinese culture had a great influence on Japan. (Note: For example, the capital was set in 710 at Heijō-kyō (modern Nara), whose layout was based on Chinese models.) These works were compiled following a decree in 681 from Emperor Tenmu, who sought to set a stable version of what appeared in the Teiki and Kyūji, no longer extant, possibly non-existent works of which numerous contradictory editions were said to have circulated. The Kojiki and Nihon Shoki were compiled by functionaries of the imperial administration and centred on the reigns and deeds of past emperors, seeking to legitimize their actions. The emergence of this type of publication became possible through the strengthening of centralized authority within a strong state.

The authors of the Kojiki of 712 trace the first work of this type to 620, when Prince Shōtoku is said to have written the first historical books, the Tennōki and Kokki. The existence of these works is debated, though modern historians trace the first historical writings to the mid-7th century. The form is unknown, but they are likely to have copied Chinese chronicles with Korean influences due to their transmission through the kingdom of Baekje on the Korean Peninsula.

The Kojiki was intended essentially for use within the court and is written in a mixture of Classical Chinese and phonetic readings of Chinese characters. It takes Imperial China as its model and depicts the territory of Japan as extending historically to territorial claims as far back as the Korean kingdom of Baekje. Japan is presented as a sovereign country, and China is never mentioned. The writings focus on the Imperial House of Japan and the genealogy of the great families of the court.

The Nihon Shoki departs from the form of the Kojiki. It is written entirely in Classical Chinese and designed to be presented to foreign envoys. Unlike the Kojiki, it gives only a small place to the creation myths of Japan, and Chinese writings (such as the Book of Wei and the Book of Jin) and above Koreans are widely cited in it. The chronology of the chronicles of the kingdom of Baekje serves as reference by which to weave Japanese history, and links are also made with Chinese chronology. (Note: The "Queen of Wa [Japan]" mentioned in the Chinese Records of the Three Kingdoms been is identified as Himiko) It also borrows the Chinese idea of the Mandate of Heaven, but differs from it to legitimize the entire Japanese imperial lineage. The Kojiki and Nihon Shoki also differ from Chinese models by including a large number of poems.

=== Six national histories ===
In 718, the Yōrō Code commissioned the Ministry of the Centre to compile a national history; the resulting Nihon Shoki of 720 served as a basis for similar works. Other historical chronicles were published over the following century: the Shoku Nihongi in 797, the Nihon Kōki in 840, the Shoku Nihon Kōki in 869, the Nihon Montoku Tennō Jitsuroku in 871, and the Nihon Sandai Jitsuroku in 901. With the Nihon Shoki, they form the Rikkokushi—the "six national histories". Beginning in the 11th century, in the mid-Heian period, state power weakened, and this sort of great chronicle was abandoned. Their form later served as inspiration during the Edo period of the 17th–19th centuries, when the shōguns sought to legitimize their power by having historical works of this type written.

The writing of the Shoku Nihongi, the first successor to the Nihon Shoki began about 760 by Fujiwara no Nakamaro, but suffered several setbacks before its publication in 797, such as Nakamaro's death in the Fujiwara no Nakamaro Rebellion in 764; the thirty draft volumes drew criticism for concentrating on anecdotal facts and ignoring some major events. Emperor Kōnin had the project revived, but it still remained in draft form. Edicts in 794 and 797 made it possible to complete the project. The forty volumes of the Shoku Nihongi cover the period from 697 to 791. The final work stands out for its use of new sources, such as Buddhist temple registers or tax revenue reports. Like the Kojiki it is written in a language based on classical Chinese and on a phonetic use of Chinese characters. The Shoku Nihongi also describes certain aspects of Japanese society of the time, such as the conditions of the workers at construction sites in the capital Heijō-kyō (modern Nara). In keeping with Chinese models, the place of poetry is greatly reduced.

Emperor Saga had the compilation of the Nihon Kōki begun in 819, but the project soon came to a stop due to the deaths of several of its coordinators. It was finally completed in 840, its 40 volumes chronicling the period 792 to 833. Biographies of the main figures of the Imperial Court in Kyoto were included at the time of their deaths for the first time. The three following books, the Shoku Nihon Kōki, the Nihon Montoku Tennō Jitsuroku, and the Nihon Sandai Jitsuroku, were compiled following the codes established by the earlier three, but focusing on shorter periods: the Shoku Nihon Shoki and Nihon Montoku Tennō Jitsuroku each focus on a single imperial reign. Seeking still to get closer to Chinese models, they include references to natural disasters. They focus less on the court. The Fujiwara clan, which dominated the court, displayed its power in other genres of writing, such as rekishi monogatari ("historical tales"). The imperial lineage was sufficiently legitimized by different historical writings and no longer needed to order such works to assert its authority. The closure in 969 of the office charged with writing the next of these works, the Shinkokushi, marked the end of this style.

=== Historical tales beginning in the 9th century ===
New forms of historical account flourished from the 11th to 16th centuries. They drew inspiration from court literature such as The Tale of Genji then in fashion among the nobility. In contrast to earlier chronicles, these texts take a more subjective approach, concentrating on narrative to attract the interest of the reader, and were written in Japanese rather than classical Chinese. They focus more on historical figures, in particular in gunki monogatari "warrior tales".

The earliest of these accounts, the Eiga Monogatari, follows the Rikkokushi, as it begins in 887 and completes the Nihon Sandai Jitsuroku. It contains numerous dating errors (about 20% of the dates are incorrect), and many embellishments and fabrications. Four works known together as Shikyō ("Four Mirrors") were written following this first monogatari. Using the image of the historical mirror used by the Chinese historian Sima Qian in 2nd century, and use a narrator to tell a story through the lives of important characters. The emphasis is still is on the lives of court nobles in the capital. The first three appeared in the 12th century: the Ōkagami ("The Great Mirror", 1119), the Imakagami ("Today's Mirror", 1170), and the Mizukagami ("The Water Mirror", 1195). The fourth, Masukagami ("The Clear Mirror"), appeared between 1368 and 1376. and covers Kyoto court life during the Kamakura period (1185–1333).

Gunki monogatari "warrior tales" were in a style meant to be recited by itinerant monks. The earliest of these is the Hōgen Monogatari, which deals with the Hōgen Rebellion of 1156. The Heiji Monogatari followed, describing the Heiji Rebellion of 1159–1160. Where the former keeps to describing events, the second distills the principles of good governance, inspired by Confucian theory to explain events. The most prominent of this sort of book, the Heike Monogatari, covers the conflicts between the Minamoto and Taira clans. It is deeply influenced by Buddhist themes, but is limited in political analysis.

Two of these works aimed at a comprehensive retelling and interpretation of the history of Japan. The Gukanshō of 1220 gave a Buddhist reading of the nation's history, and the Jinnō Shōtōki of 1339 a Shinto one. The latter asserts Japan as a country chosen by the gods and thus superior to all others, which has left a lasting influence on Japanese historiography, politics, and nationalism.

=== Diversification of forms at the end of the Middle Ages ===
During the Japanese Middle Ages the gunki monogatari remained an important genre of historical narrative. The country underwent numerous periods of civil conflict, such as the Nanboku-chō (1336–1392), Sengoku (1467–1603), and Azuchi–Momoyama period (1573–1603), driving the popularity of such works. The 15th-century Ōninki covers the Ōnin War (1467–1477) and is one of the major representatives of the style of the period. Two other prominent examples appeared at the beginning of the 17th century, both biographical accounts of military leaders: that of Oda Nobunaga in the Shinchō kōki and that of Toyotomi Hideyoshi in the Taikōki.

Diplomatic history first appeared in Japan in 1470 with the publication of Zuikei Shūhō's Zenrin Kokuhōki which traces the nature of international exchanges between Japan, China, and Korea. The work reproduces many diplomatic documents.

The imperial court also produced numerous historical works. For example, Ichijō Kanera published the Kuji Kongen ("Origins of Court Ritual"), which traces the main events affecting court society. It refers to the lunar cycle while detailing the origins and development of these events. In 1455–1457 Ichijō also published the Nihon Shoki Sanso, a commentary on the Nihon Shoki, evidencing that the Nihon Shoki formed part of the readings of the nobles of the time. The work of the Shinto priest Yoshida Kanetomo, is also notable, as it shows correspondences between the Japanese calendar and three foreign ones.

== History ==
The process of compiling a written history of Japan began in the seventh century. The most important of the early works are the Rikkokushi or six national histories which were written in the 9th century. The strategies for writing history changed over time. The earliest works were created by Imperial edict. In 1793, the Tokugawa shogunate established the Institute for Japanese Studies (Wagaku Kôdansho). In 1869, Emperor Meiji issued an Imperial rescript which explained the importance of historiography:

Historiography is a for ever immortal state ritual (taiten) and a wonderful act of our ancestors. But after the Six National Histories it was interrupted and no longer continued .... Now the evil of misrule by the warriors since the Kamakura period has been overcome and imperial government has been restored. Therefore we wish that an office of historiography (shikyoku) be established, that the good custom of our ancestors be resumed ....

In 1929, the Meiji period office of historiography was renamed the Historiographical Institute (Shiryo Hensan-jo).

== Interpretive models ==
By the 1960s, Japanese historians were divided between Marxists and Non-Marxists, but they generally agreed on emphasizing the process of modernization as the driving force in Japanese history after 1850. Non-Marxist historians in the United States were specially influential introducing modernization models. However, a younger generation of Japanese scholars in the 1970s rejected modernization models because they obscured class conflict and the social dynamics of society. By the 1980s, Marxism was in disrepute after the fall of Soviet communism, and more complex versions of multi-dimensional modernization came to be used. This led to scholarly debates over gender roles, living standards, domestic economies, agricultural practices, educational programs, and demographic changes. The line of argument is that modernization was not a single simple trajectory toward social economic and political progress, but it also could have authoritarian and statist outcomes, and in some cases it was led by the militarists.

The Marxist historians divided in the 1920s and 1930s into two competing schools which debated the nature of Japanese capitalism between the old-line Socialist Rōnō and the more Stalinist and more influential Kōza schools. The Rōnō said the main goal was to nationalize finance and zaibatsu in industry, The Kōza argued the main goal was to end feudalism in terms of large landowners. As hard-line Communism weakened following the collapse of the Soviet Union, the Marxist historians have increasingly turned away from an emphasis on blue-collar industrial workers and, influenced by French historical theorist Louis Althusser, have focused more on the relationship between power structures and the economy of cultural production. Much of the research looks at late eighteenth- and nineteenth-century Edo.

A Marxist history of science emerged in the 1920s when Ogura Kinnosuke, the second president of the History of Science Society of Japan, criticized Japanese science as an imported product that was imitative and superficial, and lacking a social conscience.

== Selected works ==
=== Extant ===
- Kojiki, 712
- Nihon Shoki, 720
- Gukanshō, c. 1220—historical argument, Buddhist perspective
- Shaku Nihongi, 13th century—an annotated version for Nihon Shoki
- Jinnō Shōtōki, 1359—historical argument, Shinto perspective
- Nihon Ōdai Ichiran, 1652—historical argument, neo-Confucian perspective
- Tokushi Yoron, 1712—historical argument, rationalist perspective
- Dai Nihon Shiryō, overview of records between the years 887 and 1867

=== Partially or completely lost ===
- Kokki, 612
- Tennōki, 620
- Teiki, 681
- Iki no Hakatoko no Sho, a historical record used as a reference in the compilation of Nihon Shoki

== See also ==
- Bibliography of Japanese history
- Chinese historiography
- Historiographical Institute of the University of Tokyo
- International Research Center for Japanese Studies
- Japanese Historical Text Initiative
- Historiography
- Philosophy of history
