= Okamoto Kyōsai Zatcho =

Collected works of Okamoto Yasutaka

The Okamoto Kyōsai Zatcho (岡本況斎雑著) is the 226-volume collected works of the Japanese kokugaku scholar Okamoto Yasutaka. It was compiled after Yasutaka's death by an unknown editor, based on Yasutaka's manuscripts that had entered the holdings of Seikadō Bunko.

== Overview ==
The Okamoto Kyōsai Zatcho is a collection of Okamoto Yasutaka's works in 226 volumes. (Yasutaka's art name was Kyōsai, while zatcho means "various writings".)

It was compiled, by an unknown editor, from 155 pieces by Yasutaka that had come into the holdings of Seikadō Bunko (静嘉堂文庫). Said holdings included Yasutaka's original manuscripts, his copied manuscripts, and his textbooks with handwritten notes. The Zatcho is considered the most important collection of writings by Yasutaka.

== Contents ==
The collection includes diaries and zuihitsu such as Naniwa-e (難波江), Kyōsai Zōwa (況斎雑話), Kyōsai Zasshō (況斎雑抄) and Sōshiki Jinbutsu-shi (相識人物志).

Works of historical and literary scholarship include Kamo no Chōmei Hosshin Shūkō (鴨長明発心集考, "Collected Ponderings on the Spiritual Awakening of Kamo no Chōmei"), Shinsen Rokujō Kō (新撰六帖考, "Ponderings on the Shinsen Rokujō") Goshūi, Kin'yō, Shika, Senzai Songi (後拾遺・金葉・詞花・千載存疑, "Lingering Questions on the Goshūi, Kin'yō, Shika and Senzai Anthologies"), Hamamatsu Chūnagon Monogatari Keifu (浜松中納言物語系譜, "Genealogy of the Hamamatsu Chūnagon Monogatari"), Torikaebaya Monogatari Toshidate Keifu (とりかへばや物語年立系譜, "Genealogy and Age of the Torikaebaya Monogatari"), Aki no Yo no Naga Monogatari Shakubun (秋乃夜長物語釈文, "Annotations on the Aki no Yo no Naga Monogatari"), Ōkagami Keifu (大鏡系譜, "Genealogy of the Ōkagami"), Masukagami Kō (増鏡攷, "Ponderings on the Masukagami"), Heike Monogatari Kō (平家物語考, "Ponderings on the Tale of the Heike"), and Eiga Monogatari Shō-furoku (栄華物語抄付録, "Annotated Appendix to the Eiga Monogatari").

Works of textual analysis include Nihon Shoki Kōbun (日本書紀攷文, "Ponderings on the Nihon Shoki"), Shoku Nihongi Kōbun (続日本紀攷文, "Ponderings on the Shoku Nihongi"), Montoku Jitsuroku Kōbun (文徳実録攷文, "Ponderings on the Montoku Jitsuroku"), Sandai Jitsuroku Kōbun (三代実録攷文, "Ponderings on the Sandai Jitsuroku") and Honzō Wamyō Kōi (本草和名攷異, "Ponderings on the Honzō Wamyō").

== Works cited ==
- Umetani, Fumio (1983). "Okamoto Kyōsai Zatcho". Nihon Koten Bungaku Daijiten 日本古典文学大辞典 (in Japanese). Vol. 1. Tokyo: Iwanami Shoten. p. 468. OCLC 11917421.
