= Rikkokushi =

Japanese historical texts

Rikkokushi (六国史) is a general term for Japan's Six National Histories chronicling the mythology and history of Japan from the earliest times to 887. The six histories were written at the imperial court during the 8th and 9th centuries, under order of the Emperors. The basic sources were the court records kept by the Ministry of Central Imperial Affairs, and the biographies of meritorious officials composed in the Ministry of Ceremonial Affairs.

The collection consists of the following texts:

- Nihon Shoki (Chronicle of Japan; also called Nihongi) – 30 volumes covering the mythological period through 697. Completed by Toneri Shinnō in 720.
- Shoku Nihongi (Chronicle of Japan, Continued; also called Shokki) – 40 volumes covering 697 through 791. Completed by Fujiwara no Tsugutada and Sugano no Mamichi in 797.
- Nihon Kōki (Later Chronicle of Japan) – 40 volumes covering 792 through 833. Completed by Fujiwara no Fuyutsugu and Fujiwara no Otsugu in 840.
- Shoku Nihon Kōki (Later Chronicle of Japan, Continued) – 20 volumes covering 833 through 850. Completed by Fujiwara no Yoshifusa, Fujiwara no Yoshimi, Tomo no Yoshio, and Haruzumi no Yoshitada in 869.
- Nihon Montoku Tennō Jitsuroku (Veritable Record of Emperor Montoku of Japan; also called Montoku jitsuroku) – 10 volumes covering 850 through 858. Completed by Fujiwara no Mototsune and Sugawara no Koreyoshi in 879.
- Nihon Sandai Jitsuroku (Veritable Record of Three Generations [of Emperors] of Japan; also called Sandai jitsuroku) – 50 volumes covering 858 through 887. Completed by Fujiwara no Tokihira and Ōkura no Yoshiyuki in 901.

The national histories were discontinued after the Sandai Jitsuroku, with a seventh history—the Shinkokushi—left unfinished. They were followed by the four Mirror books (starting with Ōkagami). Despite belonging to the distinct genre of rekishi monogatari ("historical tale"), stylized narratives that, unlike the court-commissioned Rikkokushi, incorporate legendary and imaginary elements, the Mirror books were for centuries nonetheless read as straightforward historical and chronological accounts.

== See also ==
- Ruijū Kokushi, a categorized and chronological history text of the Six National Histories
- Historiography of Japan
