= Nakayama Tadachika =

Japanese noble and writer during era of power shift

Nakayama Tadachika (中山 忠親; 1131 – April 23, 1195) was a Japanese court noble and writer during the late Heian and early Kamakura period and a member of the influential Fujiwara family. His works are valuable historical documents describing a pivotal period in Japanese history when power shifted from aristocratic families at the Heian court to regional military rulers such as daimyōs and shōguns.

== Family ==
He was the third son of Fujiwara no Tadamune (藤原忠宗; 1087 – September 30, 1133), member of the Kasannoin family who were direct descendants of the Hokke branch of the Fujiwara clan. His mother was a daughter of Fujiwara no Ieyasu (藤原家保; 1080 – September 11, 1136). Living the last years of his life in Nakayama, in the Eastern part (Note: East of the Kamo River) of the capital at Heian-kyō (Kyoto), he took the name Nakayama Naidaijin (中山内大臣). Nakayama Tadachika is the founder of the Nakayama family.

== Political career ==
He made a career as lieutenant general of the imperial guards, became Head Chamberlain (kurōdo no tō) and in 1164 was appointed as associate counselor (Sangi) at the Imperial court. During the heyday of the Taira, he was appointed Provisional Master (Gon-no-daibu) of Empress Dowager Kenrei's (Taira no Tokuko) household and to Master (Daibu) of her son's, Crown Prince Tokihito (later Emperor Antoku), household. Despite loss of his office and rank shortly after the downfall of the Taira (1185), he was appointed to Dainagon and later, in 1191, to Inner Minister (Naidaijin), senior second rank, just below the Minister of the Left (Sadaijin) and Minister of the Right (Udaijin).

Nakayama Tadachika was well versed in ancient practices, court ceremonies and legislation. He held the position of bettō of the retired Emperor Go-Shirakawa. In 1185 Minamoto no Yoritomo recommended him as one of ten Kisō (議奏) to discuss politics in council.

== Author ==
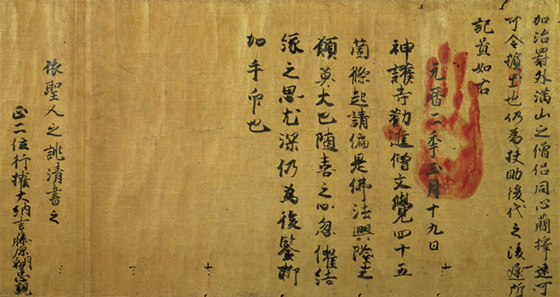
mongaku yonjūgokajō kishōmon

Tadachika's diary Sankaiki (山槐記) covers the time from 1151 to 1194, although with many gaps; it is nevertheless considered a valuable historical record for the time of the Genpei War (1180 – 1185). Another of his works, the Kirei Mondō (貴嶺問答, "Questions and Answers on Court Matters"), is an educational book on court practices. Classified as an Ōraimono ("model letter collection"), it preserves its original form as a collection of letters. It is also sometimes referred to as "Tadachika Anthology".

He is a possible candidate as author of the Imakagami and is generally credited as author of the Mizukagami, respectively the second and third part of the "mirror series" of historical tales.

A scroll with handprints held by Jingo-ji and titled Priest Mongaku's forty-five article rules and regulations (文覚四十五箇条起請文, mongaku yonjūgokajō kishōmon) by Tadachika has been designated as National Treasure in the category "ancient documents". It is a request to Emperor Go-Shirakawa to restore Jingo-ji.
