= Abuyama Kofun =

Burial mound in Ibaraki, Osaka, Japan

- 阿武山古墳 (Japanese)
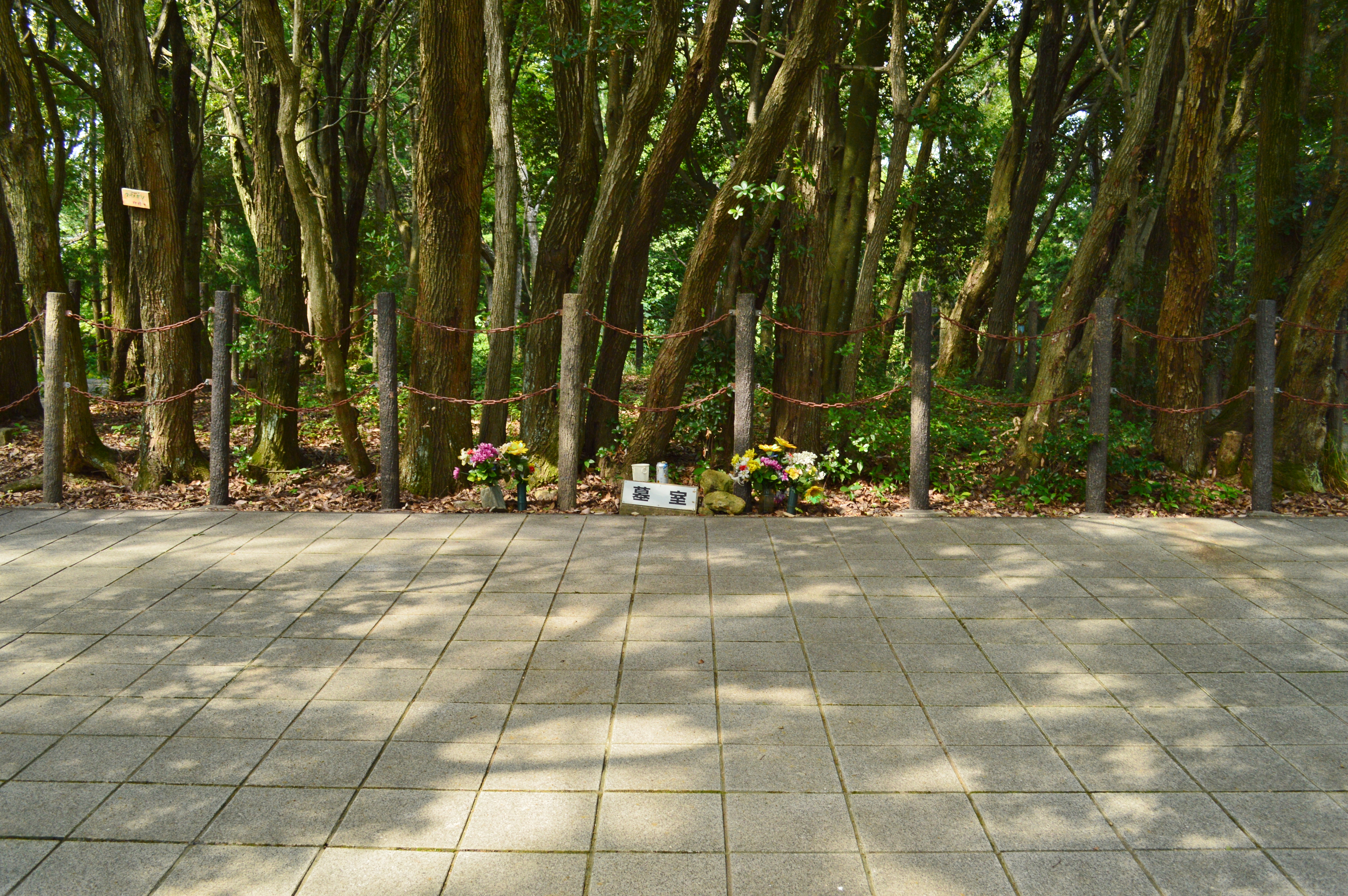
- Abuyama Kofun burial chamber site

- Abuyama Kofun Abuyama Kofun (Japan)
- 34°51′48.04″N 135°34′9.82″E
- Type: Kofun
- Periods: Kofun period
- Location: Takatsuki and Ibaraki, Osaka, Japan
- Region: Kansai region

History
- Built: 7th century

Site notes
- Public access: Yes (no facilities)

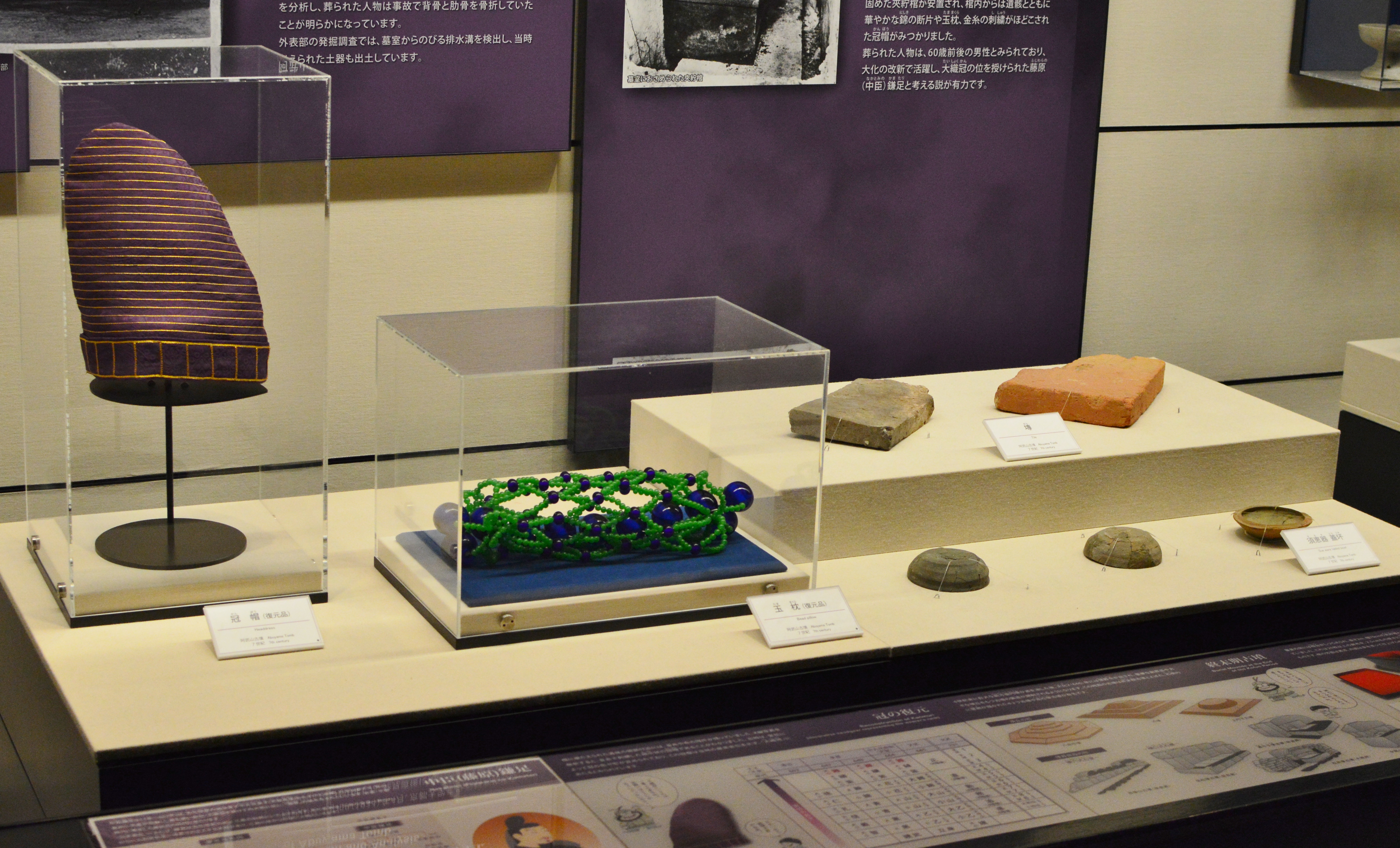
Artifacts uncovered from the tomb in Imashirotsuka Ancient History Museum

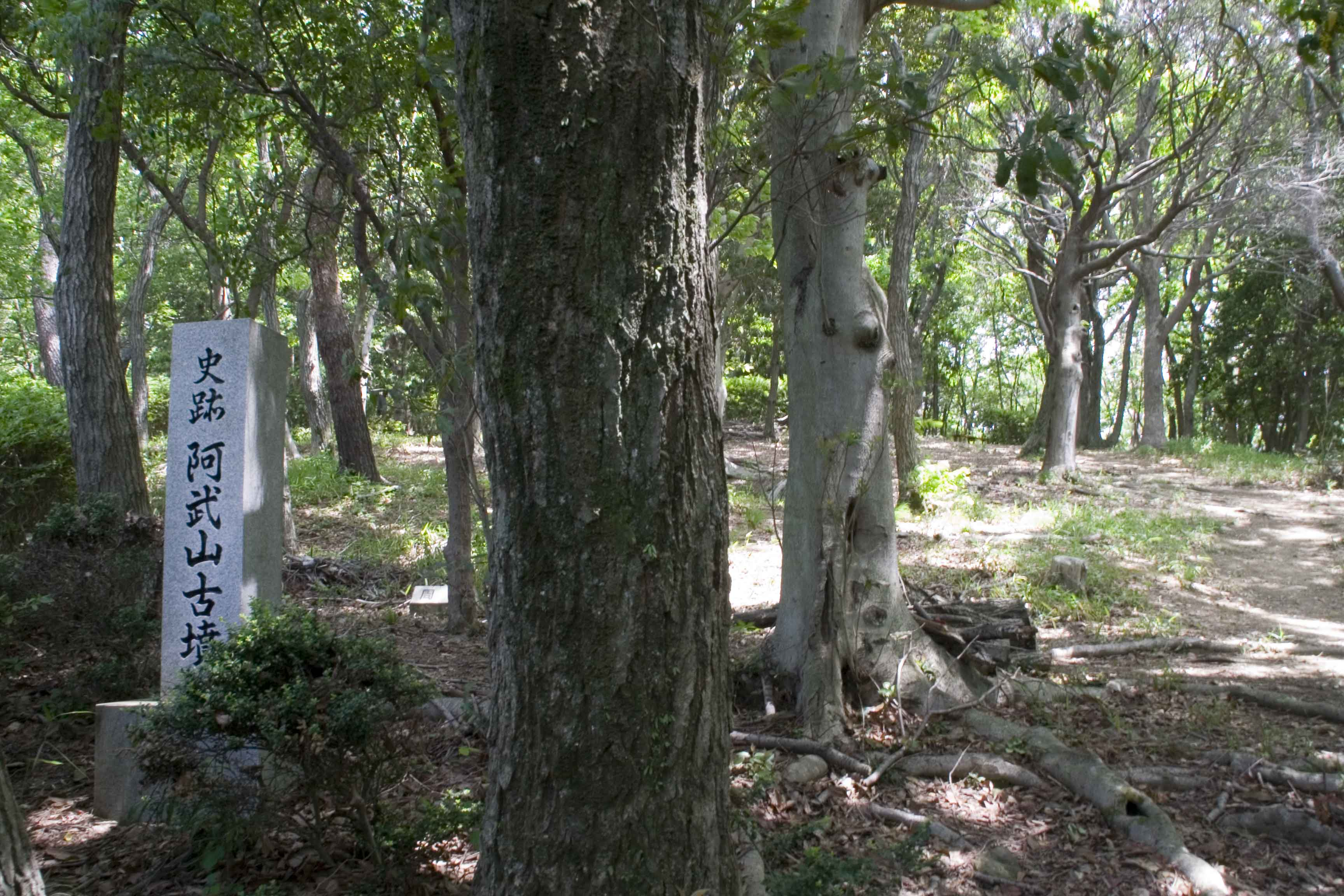
Abuyama Kofun

Abuyama Kofun (阿武山古墳) is an Asuka period burial mound, located on Mount Abu, on the border of the Nasahara neighborhood of the city of Takatsuki and the Ai neighborhood of the city of Ibaraki, Osaka Prefecture, in the Kansai region of Japan. In 1934, the interred remains of an ancient nobleman were excavated from underground, and it has been hypothesized that the tomb was dedicated to the 7th century statesman Fujiwara no Kamatari, who is known as the founder of the powerful Fujiwara clan. The tumulus was designated a National Historic Site of Japan in 1983.

== Overview ==
In 1934, the stone burial chamber of an ancient burial mound was accidentally discovered during construction of the Kyoto Imperial University's seismic observatory on the 281.1 meter Mount Abu. There was no indication at ground level that this was a kofun, but further investigate determined that it had originally been a circular enpun (円墳)-style tumulus with a diameter of 82 meters, surrounded by a dry moat and rows of cylindrical haniwa. The burial chamber contained a coffin stand, on top of which was a sarcophagus made by hardening cloth with lacquer in multiple layers. The outside was painted with black lacquer and the inside with red lacquer. This was a unique discovery, made even more so when it was discovered that inside was the almost complete mummified remains of a man in his 60s, complete with hair and clothing. There were no mirrors, swords, jewels or other grave goods, but the body appeared to have been wrapped in brocade, with many gold threads were scattered from the chest to the head, which was resting on a pillow made of woven glass beads. On April 29, 1934, the discovery was made public by the Osaka Asahi Shimbun, and quickly attracted crowds of spectators due to speculation that it was the grave of Asuka period nobleman Fujiwara no Kamatari.

However, there was a problem with the excavation. Kyoto University's Faculty of Science's Earthquake Observatory took the lead in excavating the site, but lacked knowledge of archeology and treated the ruins roughly. In response to this, the Kyoto University Archeology Laboratory, which was initially consulted but was not allowed to enter the site, and the Osaka Prefectural Government, which has jurisdiction over the ruins and was concerned about the rapid deterioration of the site filed complaints with the Ministry of Education, Ministry of Home Affairs and Imperial Household Agency. The central government ruled that as there was no question that the person buried at the site was of very high rank, and was even possibly connected to the imperial family, further investigation would be considered as lese majesty and ordered the site to be completely backfilled. Prior to this radiographic images and samples were taken by the Kyoto University's Faculty of Science's Earthquake Observatory, but unwilling to share this information with the Kyoto University Archeology Laboratory, the data was filed away in the basement of the observatory without further analysis.

In 1982, when the seismic observatory was demolished, these old files were discovered. A 1987 analysis revealed that the deceased had a strong bone structure and an athletic body, with the so-called pitcher's elbow. The cause of death was complications from injuries to the vertebral column and lumbar vertebrae sustained from a fall, as if from horseback or a high ground. The injury is thought to have left the lower body paralyzed and could have caused secondary complications such as pneumonia or urinary tract infection. The cause of death matches that of Kamatari's, who is recorded to have died from a fall from horseback.

The distribution of gold threads was determined to have been from the embroidery thread for a taishokkan woven kanmuri, which could have been used only by a noble of the highest rank. Together with the lacquered coffins and the glass-ball pillows, it was concluded that it is highly likely that the tomb was that of the 7th century statesman and aristocrat Fujiwara no Kamatari.

In 1989, the area around the burial mound was developed as a historic park.

In October 2014, the Ibaraki City Education Committee announced that ancient sen bricks discovered at the Higashinara site in Ibaraki, Osaka match the bricks found in Abuyama Kofun. The site is believed to have been the location of Mishima Betsugyō, a villa where Kamatari stayed before the Isshi Incident which triggered the Taika Reform of 645 CE.

== See also ==
- List of Historic Sites of Japan (Osaka)
