= Iki no Hakatoko no Sho =

7th-century Japanese travel record

Iki no Hakatoko no Sho (伊吉博徳書; "The Document of Iki no Hakatoko") is a historical Japanese record written by Iki no Hakatoko. Composed late in the 7th century, the record is primarily known for being used as a reference in the composition of Nihon Shoki as well as for being the oldest Japanese travel record. It is no longer extant.

== Contents ==
While the record no longer exists, a fragment of its contents may be found in quotations. Passages are quoted four times in Nihon Shoki:

- the 2nd month of 654
- the 7th month of 659: composed on the way to as well as at Chang'an
- the 7th month of 660: composed around Luoyang
- the 5th month of 661: primarily relates the return journey

The various quotations relate details about the Imperial Japanese embassies to China and foreign policy around the middle of the 7th century.

== See also ==
- Historiography of Japan
