= Taika Reform =

645 Japanese adoption of Chinese ideas

The Taika Reforms (大化の改新, "Taika no Kaishin; Reformation of Taika") were a set of doctrines established by Emperor Kōtoku (孝徳天皇 Kōtoku tennō) in the year 645. They were written shortly after the death of Prince Shōtoku and the defeat of the Soga clan (蘇我氏 Soga no uji), uniting Japan. The reforms also artistically marked the end of the Asuka period and the beginning of the Hakuhō period. Crown Prince Naka no Ōe (the future Emperor Tenji), Nakatomi no Kamatari, and Emperor Kōtoku jointly embarked on the details of the Reforms. Emperor Kōtoku then announced the era of "Taika" (大化), or "Great Reform".

The Reform began with land reform, based on the Confucian ideas and philosophies from Tang China, but the true aim of the reforms was to bring about greater centralization and to enhance the power of the imperial court, which was also based on the governmental structure of China. Envoys and students were dispatched to China to learn seemingly everything from the Chinese writing system, literature, religion, and architecture, to even dietary habits at this time. Even today, the impact of the reforms can still be seen in contemporary Japanese cultural life.

== Background ==
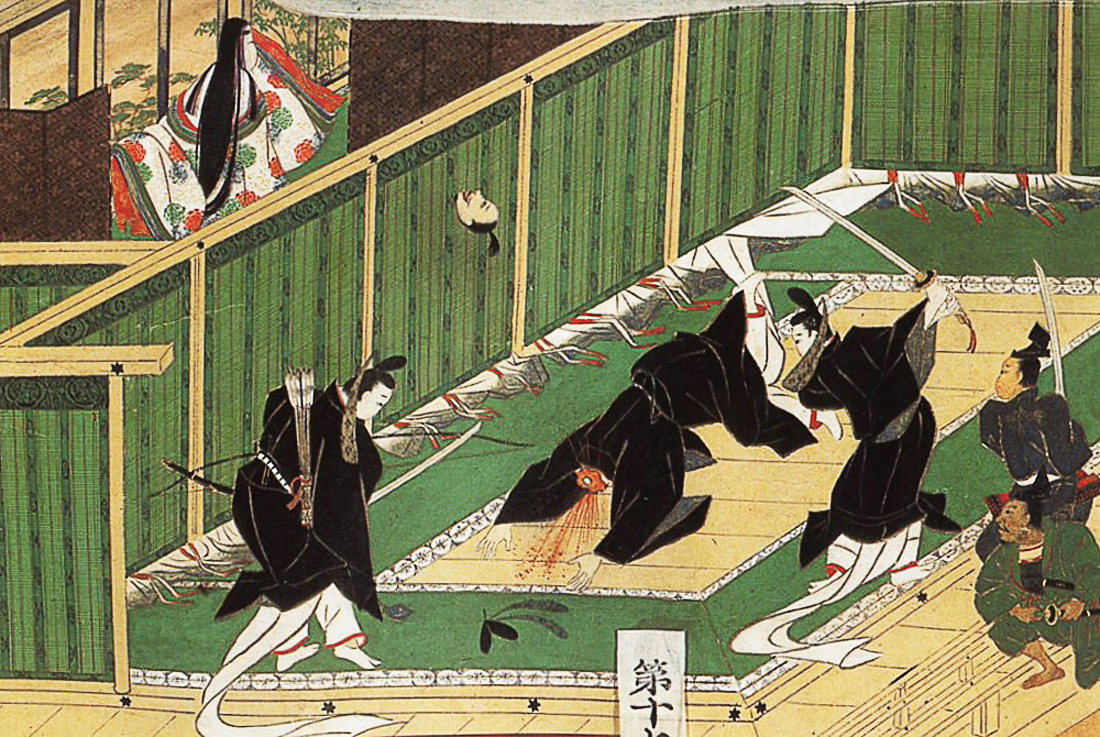
Isshi Incident

After the regency of Shōtoku Taishi ended, the Soga clan, from which Shōtoku's ancestry was derived, took hegemony of the Yamato court. The clan was opposed to Shōtoku's son Yamashiro Ōe and killed him in 643. Under the reign of Empress Kōgyoku the Soga clan head, Soga no Iruka, was virtually an almighty leader of the court.

Those who were against Soga's dictatorship included the emperor's brother Karu, the emperor's son, Prince Naka no Ōe, along with his friend Nakatomi no Kamatari, and his son-in-law Soga no Ishikawamaro (Iruka's cousin). They ended Iruka's regime by a coup d'état in 645 (Isshi incident). As Kōgyoku renounced her throne, Karu ascended to be Emperor Kōtoku.

The new emperor, together with the Imperial Prince Naka no Ōe, issued a series of reform measures that culminated in the Taika Reform Edicts in 646. At this time, two scholars, Takamuko no Kuromaro and priest Min (who had both accompanied Ono no Imoko in travels to Sui China, where they stayed for more than a decade), were assigned to the position of Kuni no Hakase (国博士; National doctorate). They were likely to take a major part in compiling these edicts which in essence founded the Japanese imperial system and government.

The ruler according to these edicts was no longer a clan leader but Emperor (in Japanese, Tennō), who exercised absolute authority. The reform was much inspired by the Japanese missions to China in the Sui and Tang dynasties, and sought to emulate China's system of centralized imperial control and Confucianism.

== Reform ==
From today's vantage point, the Taika Reform is seen as a coherent system in which a great many inherently dissonant factors have been harmonized, but the changes unfolded in a series of successive steps over the course of many years. The major objective was to reassert imperial authority through reorganizing the government, including abolishing the kabane hereditary title system previously in place. A major reform on the law include the Taihō (Great Law) Code written in 702, consisting of criminal and administrative laws modeled after Tang China, leading to the ritsuryō system. New offices created include that of the Daijō daijin (chancellor), who presided over the Dajōkan (Grand Council of State), which included the Minister of the Left, the Minister of the Right, eight central government ministries, and a prestigious Ministry of Deities.

Locally, the country was reorganized into 66 imperial provinces and 592 counties, with appointed governors. Subjects were to be surveyed, land was to be nationalized and redistributed, and private weapons were to be stored in government armories. A land tax, military service and labor obligations were instituted on subjects. A permanent capital was also established in Nara, emulating the grid system of Tang China's capital Xi'an. An exam system was also established, although unlike in China, it was open only to those from noble families. The role of women became much more restricted in Japan, especially in official domains, in emulation of China.

The Reform Edicts severely curtailed the independence of regional officials and constituted the imperial court as a place of appeal and complaint about the people. In addition, the last edicts attempted to end certain social practices, in order to bring Japanese society more in line with Chinese social practices. A legal code was enacted, with a reformed bureaucracy and law. Nonetheless, powerful clans continue to exercise power in the imperial court and in regional governments. It would take centuries for the conceptual idea of the Chinese-style emperor to take root in Japan. Chinese civilization, including its art, philosophy, literature and architecture, would become much more entrenched in Japan compared to China's system of government.

== See also ==
- Shōen—the form of Japanese fiefdom that developed after the Taika Reforms.
