= Tennōki =

Japanese historical text destroyed in 645

Tennōki (天皇記, Record of the Emperor), alternatively known as Sumera Mikoto no Fumi, is a historical text purported to have been written in 620 by Shōtoku Taishi and Soga no Umako. It is recorded in the Nihon Shoki, but no extant copies are known to exist.

According to the Nihon Shoki,

On this year, Hitsugi no Miko and Shima no Ōomi worked together on Tennōki and Kokki, composing the true history of the various court nobles.

During the Isshi Incident in 645, the residence of Soga no Emishi (a successor of Soga no Umako) was burned down. The Nihon Shoki records that the Kokki burned along with the Tennōki, but only the Kokki was saved.

On the thirteenth day as Soga no Emishi was about to be killed, flames burned the Tennōki, Kokki, and treasures. Fune no Fubitoesaka quickly grabbed the burning Kokki and presented it to Naka no Ōe.

In 2005, the remains of a building which may have been Soga no Iruka's residence were discovered in Nara. This discovery is consistent with the description found in Nihon Shoki.

== See also ==
- Historiography of Japan
