= Fujiwara no Kamatari =

7th-century Japanese statesman and politician; founder of the Fujiwara clan

- 藤原 鎌足
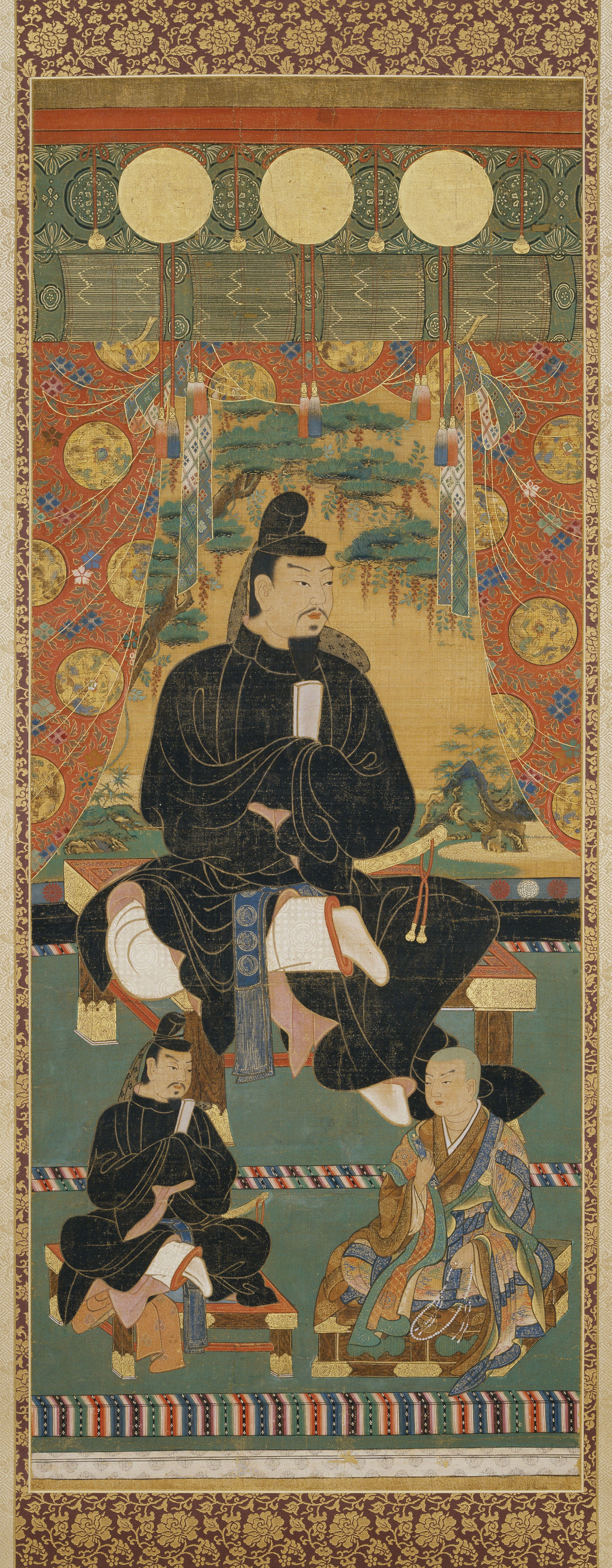
- Fujiwara no Kamatari with his sons Jo'e and Fujiwara no Fuhito, who is wearing court robes. (Nara National Museum)
- Born: Nakatomi no Kamatari; 614
- Died: November 14, 669
- Known for: Founder of the Fujiwara clan, launched the Taika Reform of 645 with Naka no Ōe (later Emperor Tenji)
- Notable work: Poems in the Man'yōshū and Kakyō Hyōshiki
- Spouse: Kagami no Ōkimi
- Children: Jo'e, Fujiwara no Fuhito, Hikami no Ōtoji, Ōhara no Ōtoji, Mimi no Toji
- Parent: Nakatomi no Mikeko,

Fujiwara no Kamatari (藤原 鎌足; Japanese pronunciation: [ɸɯ̈̀.(ɟ̟͡)ʑí.β̞ä́.ɾä́ nó̞ | kä̀.mä́.tä̀.ɾʲï̀, -nó̞ kä́-, -tä́.ɾʲí]; 614 – November 14, 669), also known as Nakatomi no Kamatari (中臣 鎌足), was a Japanese politician and aristocrat who, together with Prince Naka no Ōe (later Emperor Tenji), carried out the Taika Reform. He was the founder of the Fujiwara clan, the most powerful aristocratic family in Japan during the Nara and Heian periods. Before his birth, the Soga clan, defenders of Buddhism in the Asuka period, defeated the Mononobe clan and the Nakatomi clan, and Buddhism became the dominant religion of the Imperial Court. Kamatari was appointed Inner Minister, and, along with Prince Naka no Ōe, later Emperor Tenji (626–672), launched the Taika Reform of 645, which centralized and strengthened the central government. Just before his death, he received the surname Fujiwara and the rank Taishokan from Emperor Tenji, thus establishing the Fujiwara clan.

== Biography ==
Kamatari was born to the Nakatomi clan, an aristocratic kin group claiming descent from their ancestral god Ame-no-Koyane. He was the son of Nakatomi no Mikeko, and named Nakatomi no Kamatari (中臣 鎌足) at birth. His early life and exploits are described in the 8th century clan history Tōshi Kaden (藤氏家伝).

He was a friend and supporter of the Prince Naka no Ōe, later Emperor Tenji. Kamatari was the head of the Jingi no Haku, or Shinto ritualists and a rival of the Soga Clan and while his clan had accepted Buddhism by this time, he was an opponent of its increasing power and prevalence in the court and in the nation and Soga dominance. As a result, in 645, Prince Naka no Ōe and Kamatari made a coup d'état in the court. They slew Soga no Iruka who had a strong influence over Empress Kōgyoku; thereafter, Iruka's father, Soga no Emishi, committed suicide.

Empress Kōgyoku was forced to abdicate in favor of her younger brother, who became Emperor Kōtoku; Kōtoku then appointed Kamatari naidaijin (Inner Minister).

Kamatari was a leader in the development of what became known as the Taika Reforms, a major set of reforms based on Chinese models and aimed at strengthening Imperial power. He acted as one of the principal editors responsible for the development of the Japanese legal code known as Sandai-kyaku-shiki, sometimes referred to as the Rules and Regulations of the Three Generations.

During his life Kamatari continued to support Prince Naka no Ōe, who became Emperor Tenji in 661. Tenji granted him the highest rank Taishōkan (or Daishokukan) (大織冠) and a new clan name, Fujiwara (藤原), as honors.

== Legacy ==
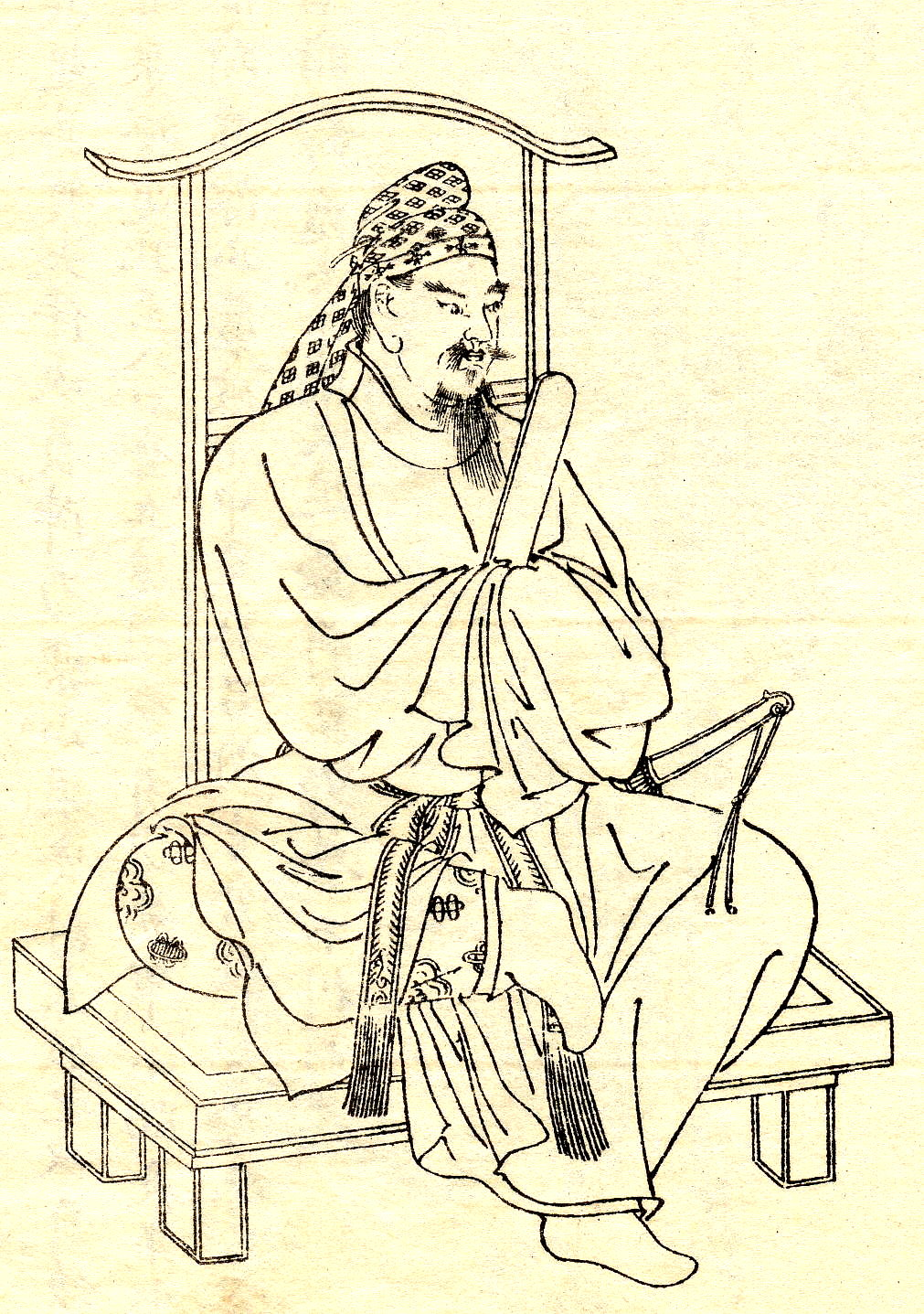
An illustration of Fujiwara no Kamatari by Kikuchi Yōsai

Kamatari's son was Fujiwara no Fuhito. Kamatari's nephew, Nakatomi no Omimaro became head of Ise Shrine, and passed down the Nakatomi name.

In the 13th century, the main line of the Fujiwara family split into five houses: Konoe, Takatsukasa, Kujō, Nijō and Ichijō. These five families in turn provided regents for the Emperors, and were thus known as the Five Regent Houses. The Tachibana clan (samurai) also claimed descent from the Fujiwara. Emperor Montoku of the Taira clan was descended through his mother to the Fujiwara.

Until the marriage of the Crown Prince Hirohito (posthumously Emperor Shōwa) to Princess Kuni Nagako (posthumously Empress Kōjun) in January 1924, the principal consorts of emperors and crown princes had always been recruited from one of the Sekke Fujiwara. Imperial princesses were often married to Fujiwara lords - throughout a millennium at least. As recently as Emperor Shōwa's third daughter, the late former Princess Takanomiya (Kazoku), and Prince Mikasa's elder daughter, the former Princess Yasuko, married into Takatsukasa and Konoe families, respectively. Empress Shōken was a descendant of the Fujiwara clan and through Hosokawa Gracia of the Minamoto clan. Likewise a daughter of the last Tokugawa Shōgun married a second cousin of Emperor Shōwa.

Among Kamatari's descendants are Fumimaro Konoe the 34th/38th/39th Prime Minister of Japan and Konoe's grandson Morihiro Hosokawa the 79th Prime Minister of Japan (who is also a descendant of the Hosokawa clan via the Ashikaga clan of the Minamoto clan).

== Historic sites ==
=== Abuyama Kofun ===
Abuyama Kofun, a megalithic tomb in Takatsuki and Ibaraki, Osaka has been identified as Fujiwara no Kamatari's tomb. The tomb and a mummy buried inside a coffin were first discovered in 1934. 50 years later, radiographic images and samples taken at the time were examined uncovering a mummy wrapped in gold thread. The kanmuri headwear found in the tomb indicates that the person buried was a noble of the highest rank Taishokkan. It was concluded that it is highly likely that the tomb was dedicated to Kamatari. According to the analysis, the mummified person had a strong bone structure and an athletic body, with the so-called pitcher's elbow. The cause of death was complications from injuries to the vertebral column and lumbar vertebrae sustained from a fall from horseback or a high ground. The injury is thought to have left the lower body paralyzed and caused secondary complications such as pneumonia or urinary tract infection. The cause of death matches with that of Kamatari's, who is recorded to have died from a fall from horseback.

=== Higashinara site ===
In 2014, the Ibaraki City Education Committee announced that ancient sen bricks discovered at Higashinara site in Ibaraki, Osaka match with the bricks found in Abuyama Kofun. The site is believed to have been the location of Mishima Betsugyō, a villa where Kamatari stayed before the Isshi Incident which triggered the Taika Reform (645).

== Family ==
- Father: Nakatomi no Mikeko (中臣御食子)
- Mother: Ōtomo no Chisen-no-iratsume (大伴智仙娘), daughter of Otomo no Kuiko (大伴囓子). Also known as "Ōtomo-bunin" (大伴夫人).
  - Main wife: Kagami no Ōkimi (鏡王女, ?-683)
  - Wife: Kurumamochi no Yoshiko-no-iratsume (車持与志古娘), daughter of Kurumamochi no Kuniko (車持国子).
    - 1st son: Jo'e (定恵, 643–666), buddhist monk who traveled to China.
    - 2nd son: Fujiwara no Fuhito (藤原不比等, 659–720)
  - Children with unknown mother:
    - Daughter: Fujiwara no Hikami-no-iratsume (藤原氷上娘, ?–682), Bunin of Emperor Tenmu, mother of Princess Tajima.
    - Daughter: Fujiwara no Ioe-no-iratsume (藤原五百重娘), Bunin of Emperor Tenmu, wife of Fujiwara no Fuhito and mother of Prince Niitabe and Fujiwara no Maro.
    - Daughter: Fujiwara no Mimimotoji (藤原耳面刀自), Bunin of Emperor Kōbun, mother of Princess Ichishi-hime (壱志姫王).
    - Daughter: Fujiwara no Tome/Tone-no-iratsume (藤原斗売娘), wife of Nakatomi no Omimaro (中臣意美麻呂), mother of Nakatomi no Azumahito (中臣東人).

== Toraijin theory ==
In modern times, Japanese historians claim that Kamatari was a Toraijin, having roots in Korea, specifically. Historian Yuji Seki (関裕二) posited that Kamatari was in fact Buyeo Pung known as "Hōshō (豊璋/ほうしょう)" in Japan, a Korean prince and son of Uija, the last king of Paekche. Seki argued that Kamatari's introduction in historical documents was very abrupt and his motivations rather questioning.

According to Seki, Kamatari's enthusiasm in trying to support Paekche during the Battle of Baekgang by suggesting a full scale rescue mission to save Paekche from falling was an indication of Kamatari's investment in Paekche affairs, possibly hinting at a personal tie to the kingdom itself. He stated that the reason behind Kamatari's persistence in reclaiming Paekche was that he was in fact Buyeo Pung, the last heir of the Paekche royal family. This is supported by Kamatari and Buyeo Pung being the only two individuals in Japanese history to receive the "Taishokkan (大織冠)" position as well as both participating in the efforts of reviving Paekche after its fall. Interestingly, despite being around the same time and having positions in the imperial court, Kamatari and Buyeo Pung's stories do not overlap with one another with Buyeo Pung's story starting after Kamatari's finishes, and vice versa. Seki posits that the names are addressing the same individual and that the only difference is Buyeo Pung's original name and his newly naturalized Japanese name.

Historically, Kamatari also tried very hard to keep good ties with the Korean kingdoms. King Uija (Buyeo Pung's father) sent Kamatari a personal gift, a Go board now called "Mokugashitan no Kikyoku (木畵紫檀棊局/もくがしたんのききょく)". After Paekche's fall, Kamatari sent Munmu of Silla and Kim Yu-sin each a ship which was considered as a grand gift at the time.

Other historians point to the Isshi incident, where a passage is found in the Nihon Shoki where Prince Furuhito no Ōe (古人大兄皇子) rushes in to report the death of Soga no Iruka exclaiming:

『韓人殺鞍作臣 吾心痛矣』

"Soga no Iruka was killed by a Korean. My heart aches"

— Nihon Shoki, Isshi incident

Some people associate "Korean" with Kamatari, as the main perpetrators of the assassination were Kamatari and Prince Naka no Ōe, and since the likelihood of the prince being Korean is highly unlikely, the consensus is that "Korean" was pointed at Kamatari. It is theorized that if Soga clan had remained in power, the chances of Japan militarily aiding Paekche would have been highly unlikely due to their reforms. Knowing this, scholars claim that Kamatari plotted the Isshi incident to put Prince Naka no Ōe into power, who was proactive in helping Paekche reclaim sovereignty. The motif behind this action being Kamatari pushing the newly crowned Japanese emperor to help regain his home kingdom.

Another proposed evidence revolves around his name. "Kamatari" written as "鎌足" includes the letter "足" meaning leg and is pronounced "Ashi (あし)" in Japanese. However, linguists suspect that Kamatari's "Tari (足)" is of Koreanic origin as the Korean word for leg is "Tari (다리)", supporting the Kamatari-Korean theory.

History manga artist Sonomura Masahiro (園村昌弘) also presented the same argument. It was also included in his work, Tenji to Tenmu - Shinsetsu Nihon Shoki - (天智と天武-新説・日本書紀-) which adopts the aforementioned theory, depicting Kamatari as Buyeo Pung, a naturalized Japanese.

However, not everyone is on board with the Toraijin theory. One of the criticisms revolves around their dates of birth. Buyeo Pung's date of birth is considered a little after Kamatari's who was born in 614, making it difficult to deem the two as the same individual. Another criticism is the reason behind Buyeo Pung's supposed naturalization when his own brother, Buyeo Sungwang also known as "Zenkō (善光 or 禅広/ぜんこう)" in Japan, was given his own Kudara no Konikishi clan which includes the name of Paekche, his kingdom of origin. Others point out that claiming his name "Tari" as Korean is a hasty decision as "Tari" could have been adopted from "Tari" from "Tarinai (足りない)" which also incorporates the "leg" character. Despite the backlash, skeptics concede that these criticisms are relatively minuscule compared to the many connections Kamatari has with Korea.

The general consensus is that there is a likely possibility that Kamatari had Toraijin origin due to compelling evidence. However, the claim that he was Buyeo Pung or anyone of greater importance may be an aggrandization.

== Popular culture ==
- Portrayed by Noh Seung-jin in the 2012–2013 KBS1 TV series Dream of the Emperor.
- Portrayed by Junichi Okada in 2005 NHK special drama Taika Kaishin.

== See also ==
- Tōshi Kaden, a bibliographic record

== Sources ==
- Bauer, Mikael. The History of the Fujiwara House. Kent, UK: Renaissance Books, 2020. ISBN 1912961180.
- Brinkley, Frank and Dairoku Kikuchi. (1915). A History of the Japanese People from the Earliest Times to the End of the Meiji Era. New York: Encyclopædia Britannica. OCLC 413099
- Nussbaum, Louis-Frédéric and Käthe Roth. (2005). Japan encyclopedia. Cambridge: Harvard University Press. ISBN 978-0-674-01753-5; OCLC 58053128
- Titsingh, Isaac. (1834). Nihon Ōdai Ichiran; ou, Annales des empereurs du Japon. Paris: Royal Asiatic Society, Oriental Translation Fund of Great Britain and Ireland. OCLC 5850691
