= Yamagiwa =

Yamagiwa is a Japanese surname that may refer to

- Daishiro Yamagiwa (born 1968), Japanese politician
- Joseph K. Yamagiwa (1906–1968), American educator
- Yamagiwa Katsusaburō (1863–1930), Japanese pathologist and cancer researcher
- Masamichi Yamagiwa (1901–1975), Japanese businessman
