= Kokki =

Lost work of Japanese history

Kokki (国記), alternatively known as Kuni tsu Fumi meaning "National Record", is a Japanese historical text purported to have been written in 620 by Shōtoku Taishi and Soga no Umako. It is recorded in the Nihon Shoki, but there are no known extant copies. Assuming that it did in fact exist, it would predate both the Kojiki (712) and the Nihon Shoki (720).

According to the Nihon Shoki,

On this year, Hitsugi no Miko and Shima no Ōomi worked together on Tennōki and Kokki, composing the true history of the various court nobles.

During the Isshi Incident in 645, the residence of Soga no Emishi (a successor of Soga no Umako) was burned down. The Nihon Shoki records that the Kokki burned along with the Tennōki, but the Kokki was saved before being destroyed.

On the thirteenth day as Soga no Emishi was about to be killed, flames burned the Tennōki, Kokki, and treasures. Fune no Fubitoesaka quickly grabbed the burning Kokki and presented it to Naka no Ōe.

However, this copy or its remains did not apparently survive.

On November 13, 2005, the remains of Soga no Iruka's residence were discovered in Nara, supporting the description found in Nihon Shoki. Researchers speculate whether parts of the Tennōki or Kokki may be found.

== See also ==
- Historiography of Japan
