= Four mirrors =

The term four mirrors, or "the Four Mirrors," may refer to:

- Mirror armour, of Mughal and Mongol "Four Mirrors" ("char-aina") type.
- Shikyō (Japanese: 四鏡) "Four Mirrors"; four Japanese history books of the Muromachi Period
- Sijing (Chinese: 四鏡) "Four Lenses"; article in the Huashu with the earliest known reference to the basic types of simple lenses
