= Iki no Hakatoko =

Iki no Hakatoko (伊吉 博德; seventh century) was a Japanese diplomat, legal scholar and writer. It is said that his diary, Iki no Hakatoko no Fumi (伊吉連博徳書, "Iki no Hakatoko's Writings"), a record of his mission to Tang China, is the oldest example of a diary in Japan. None of the original text has been preserved but extracts are quotes in the Nihon Shoki.

== Mission to China ==
- 659-661 envoy to China on behalf of Empress Saimei.
- 667-668 he went to China on behalf of Emperor Tenji, travelling with Kasa no Moroishi (笠諸石?) to the court of the Gaozong, Emperor of China. On his return voyage to Japan, he escorted Tang emissary Sima Facong (司馬法聰) to the army stationed at the old Baekje garrison.
