= Shikyō =

The shikyō (四鏡, "four mirrors") are four Japanese histories in the rekishi monogatari genre from the late Heian period to the early Muromachi period. They are also known as kagami mono (鏡物).

The four histories are:

- Ōkagami (大鏡; The Great Mirror)
- Imakagami (今鏡; Today's Mirror)
- Mizukagami (水鏡; The Water Mirror)
- Masukagami (増鏡; The Clear Mirror)
