= Nihon Sandai Jitsuroku =

Japanese history text of 901

Nihon Sandai Jitsuroku (日本三代実録; "The True History of Three Reigns of Japan"), abbreviated as Sandai Jitsuroku, is an officially commissioned Japanese history text. Completed in 901, it is the sixth and final text in the Six National Histories series. It covers the years 858–887.

== Background ==
Following the earlier national history Nihon Montoku Tennō Jitsuroku (879), Emperor Uda ordered the compilation of the years since then. It was compiled by Fujiwara no Tokihira, Sugawara no Michizane, Ōkura no Yoshiyuki, and Mimune no Masahira. The text was completed in 901.

== Contents ==
Written in Classical Chinese and contained within fifty volumes, the contents cover a span of thirty years from 858 to 887 corresponding to three imperial reigns: Seiwa, Yōzei, and Kōkō. It contains many imperial edicts and is more detailed compared to the earlier texts. Particularly famous is a description of Ariwara no Narihira. Parts of volume 15, and volumes 19 to 48 have been omitted in surviving maunscripts.

Also described is an earthquake in July 869 and a tsunami that flooded the plains of northeast Japan: "The sea soon rushed into the villages and towns, overwhelming a few hundred miles of land along the coast. There was scarcely any time for escape, though there were boats and the high ground just before them. In this way about 1,000 people were killed." These were the same plains that were submerged in the 2011 Tōhoku earthquake and tsunami, according to one account. "Analysis of sediments left by the 869 tsunami led to an estimate that the earthquake had a magnitude of 8.3."

== Final National History ==
Nihon Sandai Jitsuroku is the final text in the Six National Histories series. In 936, a national history bureau (撰国史所) was established to maintain the existing national histories as well as to continue with their compilation. A new text, Shinkokushi, was begun. However, it remained in draft form and was never completed. The declining power of the Ritsuryō institution is cited as a cause.

== See also ==
- Ruijū Kokushi, a categorized and chronological history text of the Six National Histories; valuable for reconstructing incomplete sections of Nihon Sandai Jitsuroku.
