= Shaku Nihongi =

Ancient Japanese text

Shaku Nihongi (釈日本紀) is an annotated text of the Nihon Shoki compiled by Urabe Kanekata between 1274 and 1301 that is 28 volumes in length.

== Contents ==
The 28 volumes are divided into seven sections:

- volume 1: a commentary introducing the material of the text
- volume 2: a list of kanji and their readings
- volume 3: a collection of items needing further explanation
- volume 4: imperial genealogy
- volumes 5-15: definitions for a selection of words and phrases
- volumes 16-22: a collection of old words and readings
- volumes 23-28: waka poetry

== Value ==
Besides being an important early study of Nihon Shoki, it also includes many full citations from other historical texts, some of which are no longer extant. These include Jōgūki, Nihongi Shiki, Kogo Shūi, Tensho, Sendai Kuji Hongi, and more than thirty fudoki.

In addition, it is a valuable resource to supplement history missing from Kojiki and Nihon Shoki. The imperial genealogies are important since the genealogies that were once part of Nihon Shoki have since been lost. For example, they clarify the genealogy for Emperor Keitai which is lacking in the existing Nihon Shoki.

The collection of definitions and readings for old words are also linguistically valuable.

== See also ==
- Historiography of Japan
- Nihon Shoki, the subject of this annotated text
