= Ruijū Kokushi =

Ruijū Kokushi (類聚国史) is a historical text that categorizes and chronologizes the events listed in the Six National Histories. It was compiled by Sugawara no Michizane and completed in 892. The text was commissioned by Emperor Uda.

== Contents ==
The text was originally 200 volumes in length with two indices and three genealogical volumes. However, much of it was lost during the Ōnin War in the late 15th century. Only 62 volumes are currently extant: volumes 1–5, 8–11, 14–16, 19, 25, 28, 31–36, 40, 54, 61, 66, 71–75, 77–80, 83–84, 86–89, 99, 101, 107, 147, 159, 165, 170–171, 173, 177–180, 182, 185–187, 189–190, 193–194, 199.

The text categories and subcategories the historical accounts given in the Six National Histories, listing each of which in chronological order. There are a total of eighteen categories, with another five lost in the missing volumes.

While the final national history, Nihon Sandai Jitsuroku, was completed in 901, nine years later, Michizane was one of the contributing editors and was thus able to incorporate early content.

The editorial policy was to be true to the original sources without modifying or adding to the content. It is thus a valuable resource in reconstructing Nihon Kōki, Shoku Nihon Kōki, and Nihon Sandai Jitsuroku, all of which were largely lost over time.
