= Isshi incident =

645 Japanese assassination and political crisis

Coordinates: 34.4734°N 135.8210°E

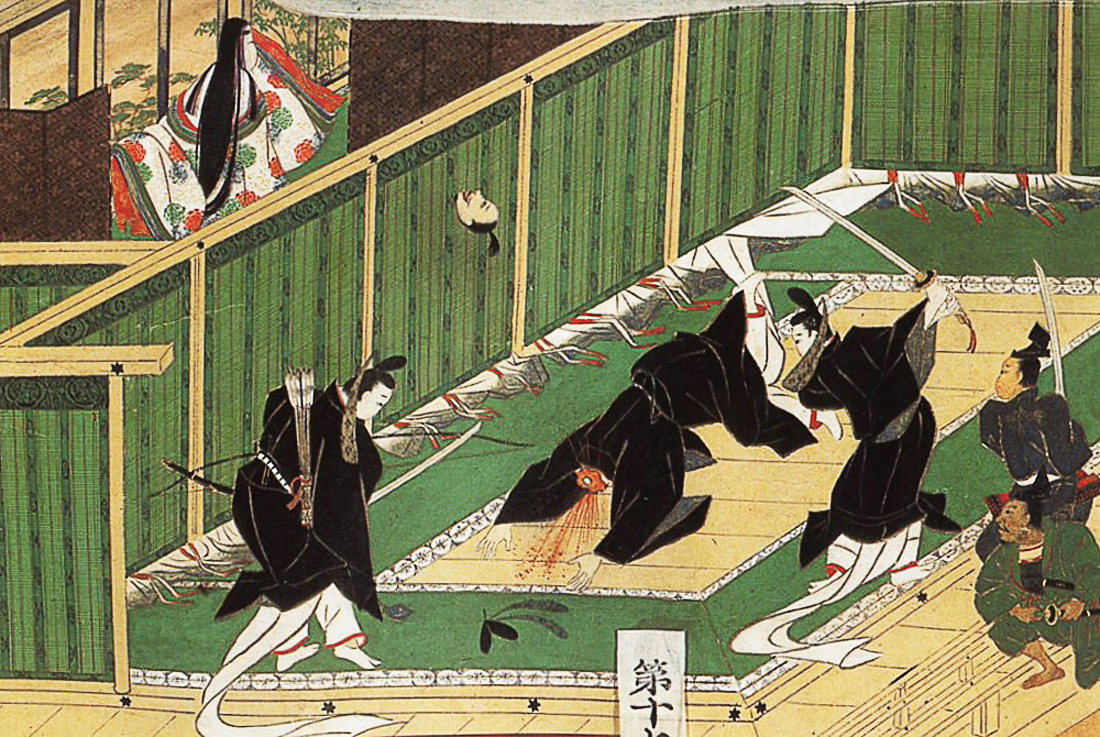
Depiction of the assassination of Soga no Iruka from the Tōnomine Engi Scroll, painted during the Edo period (17–19th century).

The Isshi incident (Japanese: 乙巳の変, Hepburn: Isshi no Hen) was a successful plot by Nakatomi no Kamatari (Fujiwara no Kamatari), Prince Naka no Ōe and others who conspired to eliminate the main branch of the Soga clan, beginning with the assassination of Soga no Iruka. It takes its name from the zodiological name of the year 645 during which the Taika Reform, a transformative event in Japanese Imperial history, occurred.

== Assassination of Iruka ==
The assassination of Iruka took place on July 10, 645 (traditional Japanese date: 12th day of the 6th month of 645), during a court ceremony at which memorials from the Three Kingdoms of Korea were being read to Empress Kōgyoku by Ishikawa no Maro. Prince Naka no Ōe had made elaborate preparations, including closing the palace gates, bribing several palace guards, hiding a spear in the hall where the ceremony was to take place and ordering four armed men to attack Iruka. However, when it became clear that the four men were too frightened to carry out the orders, Naka no Ōe rushed Iruka himself and cut open his head and shoulder. Iruka was not killed immediately, but protested his innocence and pleaded for an investigation.

Prince Naka no Ōe pleaded his case before Empress Kōgyoku, and when she retired to consider the matter, the four guards finally rushed Iruka and completed the killing. Shortly afterwards, Iruka's father Soga no Emishi killed himself by setting fire to his residence. The conflagration destroyed the manuscript copy of the Tennōki and many other Imperial treasures which had been taken for safe-keeping by the Soga, but Fune no Fubitoesaka quickly grabbed the burning Kokki from the flames. Later, he is said to have presented it to Naka no Ōe; but no known extant copies of the work remain.

== Response from Empress Kōgyoku and eventual abdication ==
The violence actually unfolded in Kōgyoku's presence. The Empress responded to this shock by determining to renounce the throne. Japanese society during the Asuka period was sensitive to issues of "pollution", both spiritual and personal. Deaths—especially a violent killing in close physical proximity to the Empress—were considered to have been amongst the worst possible acts of pollution—an event so stunning that it would have warranted days of seclusion in an uncertain process attempting to redress what would have been construed as a kind of profanity.

Although Kōgyoku wanted to abdicate immediately in favour of Naka no Ōe, on the advice of Nakatomi no Kamatari he insisted that the throne should pass instead to his older brother, Furuhito no Ōe, or to his maternal uncle (Kōgyoku's brother) Prince Karu. Furuhito no Ōe resolved the impasse by declaring his intention to renounce any claim to the throne by taking the tonsure of a Buddhist monk. That same day—traditionally said to be July 12, 645, Furuhito no Ōe shaved off his hair at Hōkō-ji, in the open air between the Hall of the Buddha and the pagoda. At this point, Kōgyoku did abdicate in favor of her brother, who shortly thereafter acceded to the throne as Emperor Kōtoku (645–654). After Kōtoku's death Kōgyoku took the throne once more as Saimei (r. 655–661), before Naka no Ōe himself finally took the throne as Emperor Tenji (661–672).

== Discussion surrounding historical passage ==
Within the Nihon Shoki, a passage is found where Prince Furuhito no Ōe (古人大兄皇子) rushes in to report the death of Soga no Iruka exclaiming:

「韓人殺鞍作臣 吾心痛矣」

[Soga no Iruka was killed by a Korean. My heart aches.]

— Nihon Shoki

Though the incident took place during a court ceremony for the envoys from Korea, scholars remain puzzled as to the meaning behind Soga no Iruka being "killed by a Korean". This prompted many Japanese historians to examine the exact meaning behind his statement, leading to several theories.

- An interpretation of "Soga no Iruka was killed by heavily associating himself with the Koreans".
- An interpretation of "If Soga no Iruka had not invited the Koreans, this could have been avoided".
- That the messengers from Korea were in fact not official envoys, but conspirators of Prince Naka no Ōe who disguised themselves to stage a ceremony.
- The suggestion that Prince Naka no Ōe was in fact Korean. However, this is highly unlikely due to several inconsistencies within historical texts.
- The suggestion that Fujiwara no Kamatari was in fact Korean and helped the prince assassinate Soga no Iruka. This is referred to as the Toraijin theory.

Despite much effort, the true meaning behind this passage remains unclear.
