= Hisao Ōtsuka =

- Born: May 3, 1907
- Died: July 9, 1996 (aged 89)
- Occupations: Historian, Economist

Hisao Ōtsuka (大塚 久雄, Ōtsuka Hisao; 3 May 1907 – 9 July 1996) was a Japanese historian, founder of an influential historiographic school in postwar Japan known as the Ōtsuka Historical School (大塚史学, Ōtsuka shigaku).
