= Okamoto Yasutaka =

Japanese kokugaku scholar (1797–1878)

Okamoto Yasutaka (岡本 保孝, 1797 – 5 April 1878) was a Japanese kokugaku scholar.

He was born into a samurai family in the service of the Tokugawa shogunate, and during his youth associated with several prominent scholars. Following the Meiji Restoration he worked unsuccessfully in various academic capacities. He published nothing during his life, and requested that his voluminous writings be burned after his death. While this was not done, his works have not received much posthumous attention.

== Biography ==
The Okamoto Yasutaka-sensei Den (岡本保孝先生伝) records that Okamoto Yasutaka was born on the 29th day of the seventh month of Kansei 9 according to the traditional Japanese calendar, or 1797 in the Gregorian calendar. His father was Wakabayashi Kanesada (若林包貞). Both his birth father and adoptive father, the head of the Okamoto Clan, were retainers of the Tokugawa shōguns.

In 1815, he took over the Hongō Iki Tonosaka Okamoto Clan (本郷壱岐殿坂の岡本氏). In 1817 he became a disciple of the physician, waka poet and kokugaku scholar Shimizu Hamaomi. In 1819, he met Kariya Ekisai and was deeply impressed with his scholarship.

In 1870 he was offered a mid-level university teaching position, but resigned after a month. He instead moved to the university's editing and publishing department and devoted his energy to the compilation of the linguistic work Goi (語彙). In 1872, immediately following the completion of the first volume of the work, its production was cancelled and he was fired. He produced a large volume of writings, but did not publish any of it during his life, and requested that his works be burned after his death.

He died on 5 April 1878. He is buried in Tōkoku-ji (東国寺) in Matsugaya, Taitō, Tokyo. With some notable exceptions including Kyōsai Zōwa (況斎雑話) and Naniwa-e (難波江), few of his surviving works have been put into print.

== Names ==
He was born the second son of Wakabayashi Kanesada and so originally bore the family name Wakabayashi. His given name at birth was Takashi (孝), which he changed to Yasutaka (保孝) when he took over the Okamoto clan in his late teens. His courtesy name was Shikai (子戒), and he used various art names throughout his life including Kyōsai (況斎), Mashitenoya (麻志天乃屋), Jundai (順台), Saikeidō (歳計堂), Sesseidō (拙誠堂) and Kaitoku Kyoshi (戒得居士).

== Works cited ==
- Minami, Keiji (1998). "Okamoto Yasutaka". World Encyclopedia (in Japanese). Heibonsha.
- Umetani, Fumio (1983). "Okamoto Yasutaka". Nihon Koten Bungaku Daijiten 日本古典文学大辞典 (in Japanese). Vol. 1. Tokyo: Iwanami Shoten. p. 468. OCLC 11917421.
