= Shinkokushi =

Japanese official historical work

Shinkokushi (新国史; lit. 'New National History') is an unfinished Japanese official historical work compiled, in part, by the early Heian period scholar Ōe no Asatsuna, grandson of Ōe no Otondo, who had been one of the compilers of the Nihon Montoku Tennō Jitsuroku. After Asatsuna's death in 957, his cousin Ōe no Koretoki became the head compiler. It was supposed to succeed the Six National Histories.

The Shinkokushi is recorded in the Honchō Shojoku Mokuroku as having forty volumes and covering the reigns of Emperor Uda (887–897) to Emperor Daigo (897–930). However a later work, the Shūgaisho, states that the Shinkokushi was fifty volumes and included the reign of Emperor Suzaku (930-946) as well as Uda and Daigo. Because of the differences in size, lack of a formal title, and that no record of a presentation of the work survives, it is believed that the Shinkokushi was an unfinished manuscript. As a manuscript, the entirety of the Shinkokushi does not survive but instead portions of it have been passed down in other works.
