= Japanese missions to Imperial China =

Diplomatic missions sent to the Chinese court

Possible routes of embassy vessels to the Tang dynasty

The Japanese missions to Imperial China were diplomatic embassies which were intermittently sent to the Chinese imperial court. Any distinction amongst diplomatic envoys sent from the Japanese court or from any of the Japanese shogunates was lost or rendered moot when the ambassador was received in the Chinese capital.

Extant records document missions to China between the years of 607 and 839 (a mission planned for 894 was cancelled). The composition of these imperial missions included members of the aristocratic kuge and Buddhist monks. These missions led to the importation of Chinese culture, including advances in the sciences and technology. These diplomatic encounters produced the beginnings of a range of schools of Buddhism in Japan, including Zen.

From the Sinocentric perspective of the Chinese court in Chang'an, the several embassies sent from Kyoto were construed as tributaries of Imperial China; but it is not clear that the Japanese shared this view.

China seems to have taken the initiative in opening relations with Japan. The Emperor Yang of Sui dispatched a message in 605 which read:

The sovereign of Sui respectfully inquires about the sovereign of Wa.

The court of Empress Suiko responded by sponsoring a mission led by Ono no Imoko in 607. A message carried by that mission, believed to have been written by Prince Shōtoku, contains the earliest known written instance in which the Japanese archipelago is referred to by a term meaning "land of the rising sun." The salutation read, in part:

From the sovereign of the land of the rising sun (hi izuru tokoro) to the sovereign of the land of the setting sun."

The Japanese missions to Sui China (遣隋使, Kenzui-shi) included representatives sent to study government and technology.

The Japanese missions to Tang China (遣唐使, Kentō-shi) are the best known; 19 missions were completed. A 20th mission had been planned for 894 (Kanpyō 6, 8th month), including the appointment of ambassadors. However, shortly before departure, the mission was halted by Emperor Uda because of reports of unsettled conditions in China. The emperor's decision-making was influenced by the persuasive counsel of Sugawara no Michizane.

== Envoys to the Sui court ==
Japanese envoys to the Sui court were received as ambassadors:

- 607: The first diplomatic mission was led by Japan's first ambassador to China. This Japanese envoy, Ono no Imoko, had the title kenzuishi. The delegation was received in the Imperial Court.
- 608: Ono no Imoko leads a returning embassy to China. This mission included two others with the title kenzushi: Takamuko no Kuromaro (no Genri) and Minabuchi no Shōan. Kuromaro and Shōan, along with the Buddhist monk Sōmin remained in China for 32 years before returning to Japan.

== Envoys to the Tang court ==
Japanese envoys to the Tang court were received as ambassadors: Three missions to the Tang court were dispatched during the reign of Emperor Kōtoku. Emperor Kanmu's planned mission to the Tang court in 804 (Enryaku 23) included three ambassadors and several Buddhist priests, including Saichō (最澄) and Kūkai (空海); but the enterprise was delayed until the end of the year. The ambassadors returned in the middle of 805 (Enryaku 24, 6th month). They were accompanied by the monk Saichō, also known by his posthumous name Dengyō Daishi (伝教大師), whose teachings would develop into the Tendai school of Japanese Buddhism. In 806 (Daidō 1, 8th month), the return of the monk Kūkai, also known posthumously as Kōbō-Daishi (弘法大師), marks the beginning of what would develop into the Shingon school of Japanese Buddhism.

New ambassadors to China were appointed by Emperor Ninmyō in 834, but the mission was put off.

- 836–839: The mission was postponed by a typhoon; but the ambassadors did eventually travel to the Tang court, returning in 839 with a letter from Emperor Tang Wenzong.

In China, a steady and conservative Confucianist Song dynasty emerged after the end of the Tang dynasty and subsequent period of disunity during the Five Dynasties and Ten Kingdoms period. During this time, although travel to China was generally safe, Japanese rulers believed there was little to learn from the Song, and so there were no major embassy missions to China.

=== Adopting Tang models ===
Ancient Japan was called Wa, which the Tang dynasty classified as 東夷 (Eastern barbarians).

From 630 onward, Wa sent large groups of monks, students and government officials, up to 600 each time, to the Tang capital of Chang'an to learn the then advanced production technology, social system, history, philosophy, arts and architecture. Among many items adopted by Wa:

- Tang political system, which influenced the Ritsuryō administrative system of Japan.
- Heian-kyō, the new Japanese capital established in 794, was laid out in a grid based on that of Chang'an, the Tang capital.
- The pronunciations of many Chinese characters (漢字) were borrowed from the Chang’an dialect, which became known as Kan-on pronunciations.
- Tang fashion and eating habits were also adopted and popularized, the former of which heavily influenced traditional Japanese kimono.

== Envoys to the Ming court ==
Japanese envoys to the Ming court were received as ambassadors.

- 1373-1406 (Ōan 6 – Ōei 13): Embassies between China and Japan.
- 1397 (Ōei 4, 8th month): an Imperial ambassador is dispatched from Emperor Go-Komatsu to the Ming Court.
- 1401 (Ōei 8): Ashikaga Yoshimitsu sends a diplomatic mission to China as a tentative first step in re-initiating trade between Japan and Ming China. The formal diplomatic letter conveyed to the Emperor of China was accompanied by a gift of 1000 ounces of gold and diverse objects.
- 1402 (Ōei 9): A letter from the Jianwen Emperor of China was received by Yoshimitsu; and this formal communication mistakenly accords the title "king of Japan" to the Japanese shōgun.

== Envoys to the Qing court ==
During Japan's self-imposed isolation in the Edo period (1603–1868), Japan's vicarious relationships with China evolved through the intermediary of the Kingdom of Ryukyu. Japan's view of external relations was ambivalent.

- 1853 (Kaei 6): Hayashi Akira completed Tsūkō ichiran. The work was created under orders from the bakufu to compile and edit documents pertaining to East Asian trade and diplomacy; and, for example, it includes a detailed description of a Ryukyuan tribute embassy to the Qing Chinese court in Beijing.

== See also ==
- History of China
- History of Japan
- Iki no Hakatoko no Sho, 7th-century text
- Little China (ideology)
- Chinese influence on Japanese culture
- Japanese missions to Joseon
