= Joseph K. Yamagiwa =

Professor of Japanese at the University of Michigan (1906–1968)

Joseph Koshimi Yamagiwa (Japanese: 山極 越海, September 9, 1906, in Seattle, Washington – December 10, 1968) was a Professor of Japanese at the University of Michigan and the chairman of its Department of Languages and Literature. He died of a seizure.

== Early life ==
Yamagiwa attended the University of Washington, then later transferred to Bates College, located in Maine. After his college education, he proceeded to enroll in the University of Michigan's English graduate studies. He graduated with a master's degree in 1930. Yamagiwa was an editor of the early Modern Dictionary. He completed his studies in 1942, with a treatise entitled The Older Inflected Forms of Surviving in the Modern Japanese Written Language.

== World War II ==
From 1942–1946, Yamagiwa held the position of Director of the Army Military Intelligence Japanese school located at Ann Arbor and the position of Supervisor of the Language Program for the Army Specialized Training Program and the Civil Affairs Training School from 1943 until 1945. Later in 1945, he took his first post at the University of Michigan as the Supervisor of the Japanese Translation Program and was also a Research Bombing Analyst for the U.S. Strategic Bombing Survey, which took place in Washington D.C. and Tokyo. He was later appointed as a colonel in the United States Army Reserves.

== Late career ==
Yamagiwa was appointed Associate Director of Japan in 1947 and finally Director of Japan in 1953. He accepted the role of Chairman of the Department of Far Eastern Languages and Literature and was employed in that position until 1964. He was appointed the Fulbright Lecturer in Japanese literature, language, and thought at Oxford University. Yamagiwa was an active member of the Modern Language Association, the American Oriental Society, the Association for Asian Studies, the Linguistic Society of America, and the Association of Teachers of Japanese.

== See also ==
- Japanese language education in the United States
