= Ōkagami =

Ōkagami (大鏡, The Great Mirror) is a Japanese historical tale written around 1119 by an unknown author. It covers the period from 850 to 1025, the golden days of the Fujiwara family's rule. It is called a succession story (世継物語, yotsugi monogatari), along with the records of the Eiga Monogatari.

In the tale, the writer listens to a conversation mainly led by a 190-year-old man, Ōyake no Yotsugi (大宅世継, literally "world-successor"), who recalls the past. A 180-year-old man, Natsuyama no Shigeki (夏山繁樹), adds comments and a young samurai puts questions to these two elders. This narrative strategy makes the story vivid and allows for the natural addition of various opinions and criticisms.

The structure is modelled after traditional Chinese history books like the Records of the Grand Historian. It consists of Preface, Stories of Emperors, Stories of Ministers, Miscellaneous Stories and Post-fin.

This and three other tales with mirror (鏡, kagami, also read kyō) in their titles—Imakagami, Mizukagami, Masukagami—are collectively called the four mirrors (四鏡, shikyō).

== Translations ==
There are two translations into English:

- The Ōkagami: A Japanese Historical Tale, translated by Joseph K. Yamagiwa, with a foreword by Edwin O. Reischauer, London: Allen & Unwin, 1967. 488 pp. Reprint Tuttle 1997
- Ōkagami, The Great Mirror: Fujiwara Michinaga (966–1027) and His Times – A Study and Translation, by Helen Craig McCullough, Princeton, NJ: Princeton University Press, 1980. ISBN 978-0691064192.

== See also ==
- Japanese Historical Text Initiative
- Azuma Kagami
