= Mizukagami =

Mizukagami (水鏡, "The Water Mirror") is a Japanese rekishi monogatari. It is believed to have been written in the around the onset of the Kamakura period c. 1195. It has been credited to Nakayama Tadachika or Minamoto Masayori, but the actual writer is unknown. It is the third book of the four mirror series.

It deals with the oldest time-period, starting with the legendary Emperor Jimmu and ending with Emperor Ninmyō. It is told by a fictitious old woman who is visited by a bhikkhu while staying at Hase-dera. All the facts are taken from ca. 1150 Fusō Ryakuki (扶桑略記, "Brief History of Fusang") by Kōen, the teacher of Hōnen.

"Mizukagami" refers to the reflective pool in Japanese gardens in which can be seen such things as bridges and cherry blossoms in its reflection.

== See also ==
- Ōkagami
- Imakagami
- Masukagami
