= Rekishi monogatari =

Literary form in Japanese literature

Rekishi monogatari (歴史物語) is a category of Japanese literature defined as extended prose narrative. Structurally, the name is composed of the Japanese words rekishi (歴史), meaning history, and monogatari (物語), meaning tale or narrative. Because of this it is commonly translated as ‘historical tale’. Although now categorised as works of fiction, Japanese readers before the nineteenth century traditionally accepted and read rekishi monogatari, as well as the related gunki monogatari and earlier Six National Histories, as literal and chronological historical accounts.

== History ==
=== Creation of monogatari ===
Monogatari is categorised as Japanese extended prose literature, and is comparable to the epic novel. It first emerged in the late Heian period, which held dominion from 749-1573 C.E. It is believed to have originated from the oral tradition of the court ladies at the time. This is supported through the language used in examples of monogatari, which was typically either kanbun, a hybrid form of Chinese, or kana, Japanese. Kanbun was a form of Classical Chinese, and was the principal writing style used for official or intellectual works; kana, despite its high level of verbal fluency amongst Japanese people, was known in written form in the Heian Period predominantly by nobility and monks. Monogatari is further supported as having originated amongst court ladies through the knowledge that, during the Heian period, men typically wrote in Chinese, therefore the use of Japanese and hybridised Chinese suggests women developed this form of Japanese prose as a method of storytelling. Some early monogatari are believed to be written by men using female pseudonyms.

=== Legacy of monogatari ===
Monogatari was highly prevalent between the 9th to the 15th century. During this period several sub-categories of monogatari were created in response to cultural and historical change at the time, for example gunki monogatari. As a result, monogatari are still used as historical sources and means to learn about the past eras, knowledge, and culture of Japan. The introduction of European and other foreign literature to Japan began the implementation of the word monogatari in Japanese titles of foreign works of a similar nature. For example, A Tale of Two Cities is known as Nito Monogatari (二都物語), One Thousand and One Nights as Sen'ichiya Monogatari (千一夜物語) and more recently The Lord of the Rings as Yubiwa Monogatari (指輪物語), and To Kill a Mockingbird as Arabama Monogatari (アラバマ物語). However, its prevalence as a literature category has since greatly decreased, with there being only 24 monogatari today, in comparison to the 198 that existed in the 13th century.

Many of Japan’s most famous folktales, such as Taketori Monogatari, The Tale of the Bamboo Cutter, are examples of early monogatari.

=== Creation of rekishi monogatari ===
Rekishi monogatari was created as a sub-genre of monogatari soon after the establishment of monogatari itself. This is supported in the identical nature of the writing style of early monogatari and rekishi monogatari, with rekishi monogatari also written in kanbun and/or kana. Further evidence supporting this is the first recorded rekishi monogatari dating back to the late Heian period, the same time of emergence as monogatari itself. Rekishi monogatari similarly emerged in Japanese courts, with its purpose being a method of recounting stories or events. At the time of its creation, rekishi monogatari was viewed as historically accurate accounts, seen in how early works were used primarily as official court histories.

=== Evolution of rekishi monogatari ===
Rekishi monogatari originally referred to accurate accounts of events, most often official court documents. As time progressed the definition was redefined to encompass fictional or fictionalised tales as well.

== Structure and style ==
Rekishi monogatari is characterised as having an orderly, chronological structure. It typically follows the three-act structure of a classic narrative, coherently presenting to the reader a linear beginning, middle, and end. The tale’s focal figures are memorable, the complication(s) are clear. Themes often include loyalty, obligation, the supernatural, and self-sacrifice compromised by human emotion.

== Prevalence ==
Rekishi monogatari was a common form of literature in Japan from its origin in the late Heian Period up until Japan’s mediaeval age, after which its prevalence drastically decreased. Its numbers have since continued to decrease.

== Notable works ==
=== Eiga Monogatari ===
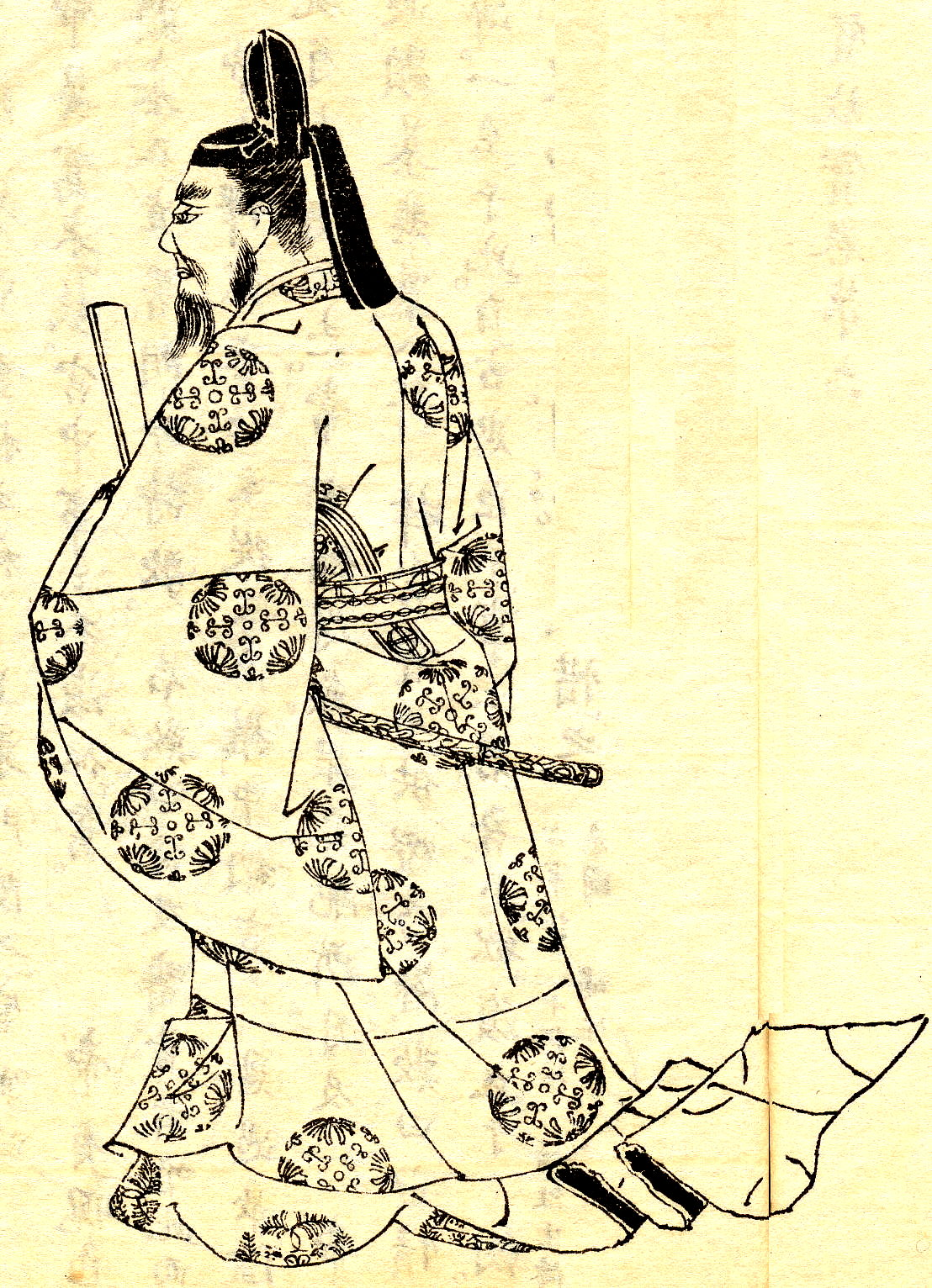
A drawing of Japanese statesman Fujiwara no Michinaga by painter Kikuchi Yosai.

Of the category rekishi monogatari there are several notable works, one of which is Eiga Monogatari (栄花物語), translated in English to The Story of Splendour. The work is believed to have been written by multiple authors over the course of 1028-1107 C.E. While its creation predates the genesis of the literature sub-category rekishi monogatari, the definition of rekishi monogatari, as an accurate historical account or fictional or fictionalised historical tale, allows works written before its inception to be classified under its genre.

Eiga Monogatari is classified as rekishi monogatari due to its retelling of the events in the life of Japanese statesman, or courtier, Fujiwara no Michinaga. It references both official court histories and other known prose of that era. The forty scrolls which comprise the text are written entirely in kana, and include many excerpts from diaries and notes of court ladies. Twenty-eight of these scrolls are devoted to Michinaga's governance, while the remaining twelve concern related topics, including other aspects of his life and the lives of his family.

=== The four Kagamimono ===
The shikyō (四鏡, しきょう), translated in English to Four Mirrors, are four Japanese histories in the rekishi monogatari genre from the late Heian period to the early Muromachi period. They are also known as kagami mono (鏡物, かがみもの). The four works are:

- Ōkagami (The Great Mirror)
- Imakagami (Today's Mirror)
- Mizukagami (The Water Mirror)
- Masukagami (The Clear Mirror)

Further notable works include:

- Rokudai Shōjiki
- Ike no mokuzu (『池の藻屑』ja:荒木田麗女)

== Legacy ==
Historically, rekishi monogatari was understood to be accurate or mildly embellished tales of events or journeys; in the current times, rekishi monogatari is primarily understood to refer to fictional, historical tales.

While monogatari are still being created, rekishi monogatari as a genre is no longer active due to it being categorised as historical tales in the classical literature era of Japan. As such, the number of existing rekishi monogatari have greatly decreased due to loss as a result of time and age.
