= Imakagami =

The Imakagami (今鏡, Japanese pronunciation: [i.ma.kaꜜ.ɡa.mʲi, -ŋa.mʲi], lit. 'The New Mirror') is a Japanese rekishi-monogatari (historical tale) written in the late Heian period. It is also called the Kokagami (小鏡, "The Small Mirror") or the Shoku-Yotsugi (続世継, "Yotsugi, Continued").

== Date and authorship ==
It has been speculated that the work was compiled in or shortly after 1170; Donald Keene, citing Isao Takehana, stated that the work was probably written between the eighth month of 1174 and the seventh month of 1175. The author is uncertain, but the most likely candidate is the waka poet Fujiwara no Tametsune (藤原為経).

== Structure and style ==
The text is in ten volumes, and is told from the point of view of an elderly woman who is described as a granddaughter of Ōyake no Yotsugi (大宅世継), the narrator of the Ōkagami, and as having formerly been in the service of Murasaki Shikibu. It has been suggested that the writer chose a woman as his fictional narrator where the Ōkagami's author had chosen two men that he wished to focus on more elegant "feminine" topics than military and political affairs.

The work contains 140 waka and countless references to Japanese and Chinese literature.

== Content ==
The work begins with a group of pilgrims visiting the temples of Yamato Province being approached by an elderly woman who, when asked if she lives in the region, says that she lived in the Capital for one hundred years and then in Yamashiro Province for another fifty, before moving to Yamato. The listeners are astonished at her great age, but she humbly replies by listing several others in China and Japan who had supposedly lived to great age, including her grandfather Yotsugi. She says her name is Ayame (iris), which was given to her because of her birth on the fifth day of the fifth month, the same day as the Iris Festival (菖蒲の節句, Ayame no Sekku), although she had also been given the nickname Imakagami (the new mirror) by her mistress Murasaki Shikibu, in reference to a poem by Bai Juyi that described the casting of a new mirror on that day.

The rest of the work describes the old lady's recollections of the past. It describes the period of roughly 150 years from 1025 to 1170. and is primarily focused on an account of the imperial family and the Fujiwara and Murakami-Genji clans.

== Relationship to other works ==
The work is classified as one of the four "mirrors" of history along with the Ōkagami, Mizukagami and Masukagami. It is considered to be a direct continuation of the Ōkagami.

Although it was written during the period of rule by the Taira military clan (Japanese Wikipedia article), its focus is on waka poetry and the affairs of nobles at court.

== See also ==
- Ōkagami
- Mizukagami
- Masukagami

== Bibliography ==
- Keene, Donald (1999). A History of Japanese Literature, Vol. 1: Seeds in the Heart — Japanese Literature from Earliest Times to the Late Sixteenth Century. New York: Columbia University Press. ISBN 978-0-231-11441-7.
- Matsumura, Hiroji (1979). Rekishi Monogatari. Tokyo: Hanawa Shobō. ISBN 978-4-827-33016-8.
- Nishizawa, Masashi (2002). Koten Bungaku o Yomu tame no Yōgo Jiten. Tokyo: Tōkyō-dō Shuppan. ISBN 4-490-10600-9.
- Takehana, Isao (1984). Imakagami (3 vols.). Tokyo: Kōdansha. ISBN 978-4-061-58329-0.
