= Nihon Montoku Tennō Jitsuroku =

Japanese history text completed in 879

Nihon Montoku Tennō Jitsuroku (日本文徳天皇実録; "The True History of Emperor Montoku of Japan"), abbreviated as Montoku Jitsuroku, is an officially commissioned Japanese history text. Completed in 879, it is the fifth text in the Six National Histories series. It covers the years 850–858, the years of reign of the 55th Japanese sovereign, Emperor Montoku (827–858).

== Background ==
Following the earlier national history Shoku Nihon Kōki (869), in 871 Emperor Seiwa ordered the compilation of the years since then. It was primarily edited by Fujiwara no Mototsune with assistance from Minabuchi no Toshina, Ōe no Otondo, Shimada no Tadaomi, Sugawara no Koreyoshi, Yoshibuchi no Yoshinari, and significant contributions by Miyako no Yoshika. The text was completed in 879.

== Contents ==
Written in Kanbun-style and contained within ten volumes, the contents cover nine years of Emperor Montoku's reign spanning from 850 through 858. The text is characteristic in that it contains few political details but many obituaries for nobles.

== See also ==
- Ruijū Kokushi, a categorized and chronological history text of the Six National Histories
