= Soga no Iruka =

Japanese aristocrat (died 645)

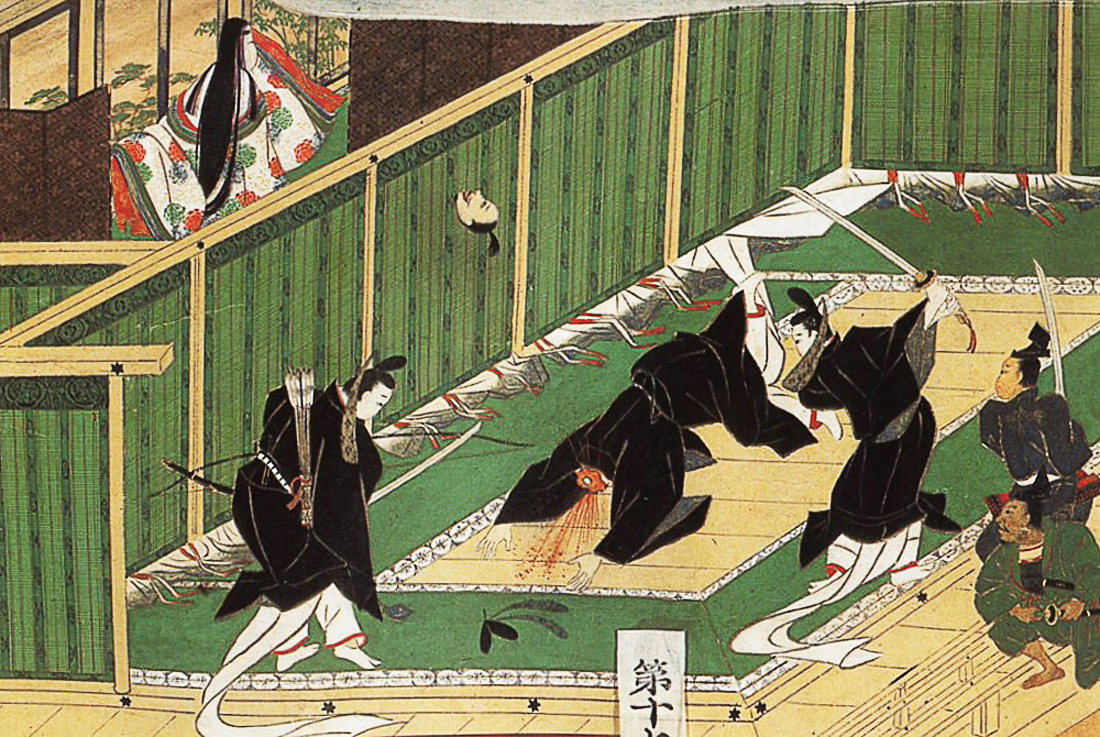
Depiction of Soga no Iruka's assassination

Soga no Iruka (蘇我 入鹿) (died July 10, 645) was the son of Soga no Emishi, a statesman in the Asuka Period of Japan.

He was assassinated at court in a coup d'état involving Nakatomi no Kamatari and Prince Naka-no-Ōe (see: Isshi Incident), who accused him of trying to murder Prince Yamashiro, a charge which Soga no Iruka denied. Soga no Emishi also committed suicide soon after his son's death, and the main branch of the Soga clan became extinct. Prince Naka-no-Oe later ascended the throne as Emperor Tenji, and Nakatomi no Kamatari was promoted and given the name Fujiwara no Kamatari.

== Legacy ==
In 2005, the remains of a building which may have been Soga no Iruka's residence were discovered in Nara. This discovery appeared to be consistent with the description found in Nihon Shoki.

== Popular culture ==
- Portrayed by Jung Jin-gak in the 2012–2013 KBS1 TV series Dream of the Emperor.
