= Masukagami =

Masukagami (増鏡, Japanese pronunciation: [ma.sɯ̥.kaꜜ.ɡa.mʲi, -ŋa.mʲi]) is a Japanese historical tale written in the early Muromachi period believed to be between 1368 and 1376. The author is not known but is believed to be Nijō Yoshimoto. It is the last of four works of mirror series and follows most recent events.

Masukagami is twenty chapters in total and follow events from 1180 to 1333 in accordance with the way Chinese classical historical tales were written. It starts with the accession of Emperor Go-Toba and ends with Emperor Go-Daigo's punishment of being deported to an island of Oki Province. The story is told through a fictitious hundred year old Buddhist nun of Seiryō-ji.

== See also ==
- Ōkagami
- Imakagami
- Mizukagami
