= Nihon Shoki =

8th-century book of classical Japanese history

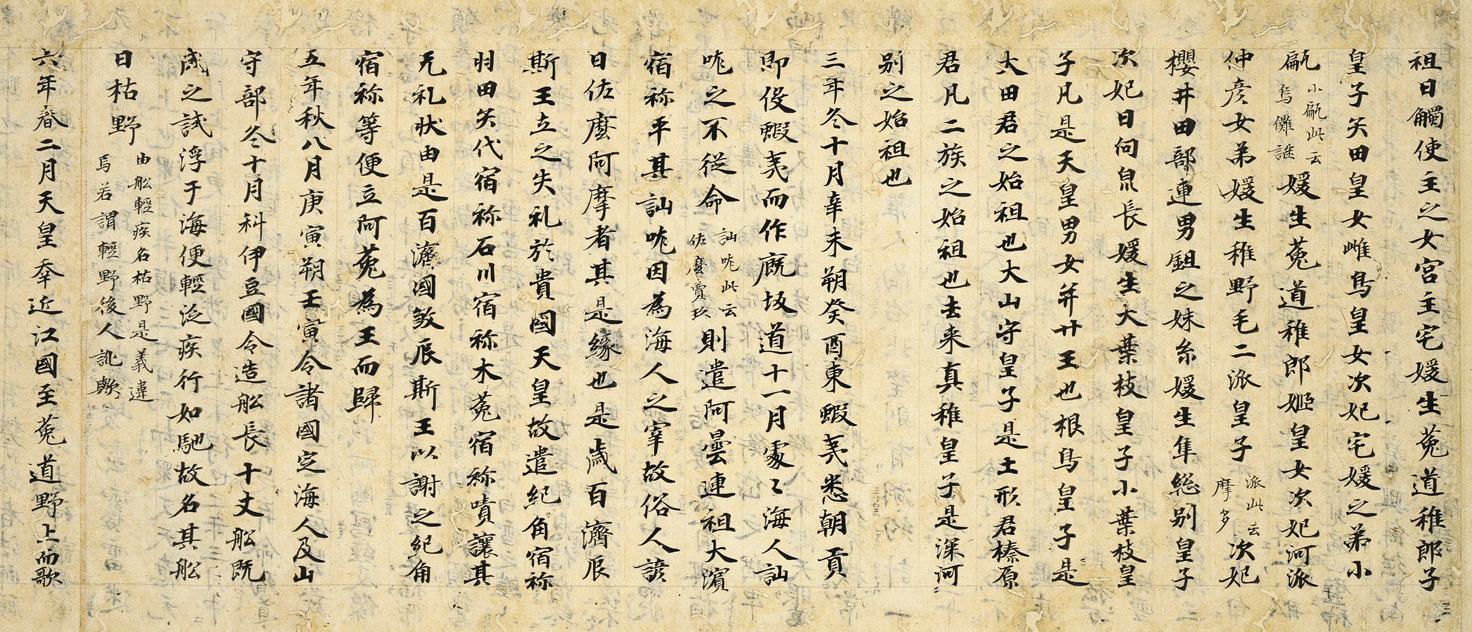
Page from a copy of the Nihon Shoki, early Heian period (c. 9th century)

The Nihon Shoki (日本書紀; Japanese pronunciation: [ɲ̟ì.hó̞ɰ̃́ ɕó̞.k̟ʲì]) or Nihongi (日本紀), sometimes translated as The Chronicles of Japan, is the second-oldest book of classical Japanese history. It is more elaborate and detailed than the Kojiki, the oldest, and has proven to be an important tool for historians and archaeologists as it includes the most complete extant historical record of ancient Japan. The Nihon Shoki was finished in 720 under the editorial supervision of Prince Toneri with the assistance of Ō no Yasumaro and presented to Empress Genshō. The book is also a reflection of Chinese influence on Japanese civilization. In Japan, the Sinicized court wanted written history that could be compared with the annals of the Chinese.

The Nihon Shoki begins with the Japanese creation myth, explaining the origin of the world and the first seven generations of divine beings (starting with Kuninotokotachi), and goes on with a number of myths as does the Kojiki, but continues its account through to events of the 8th century. It is believed to record accurately the latter reigns of Emperor Tenji, Emperor Tenmu, and Empress Jitō. The Nihon Shoki focuses on the merits of the virtuous rulers as well as the errors of the bad rulers. It describes episodes from mythological eras and diplomatic contacts with other countries. The Nihon Shoki was written in classical Chinese, as was common for official documents at that time. The Kojiki, on the other hand, is written in a combination of Chinese and phonetic transcription of Japanese (primarily for names and songs). The Nihon Shoki also contains numerous transliteration notes telling the reader how words were pronounced in Japanese. Collectively, the stories in this book and the Kojiki are referred to as the Kiki stories.

The first translation was completed by William George Aston in 1896 (English).

== Chapters ==
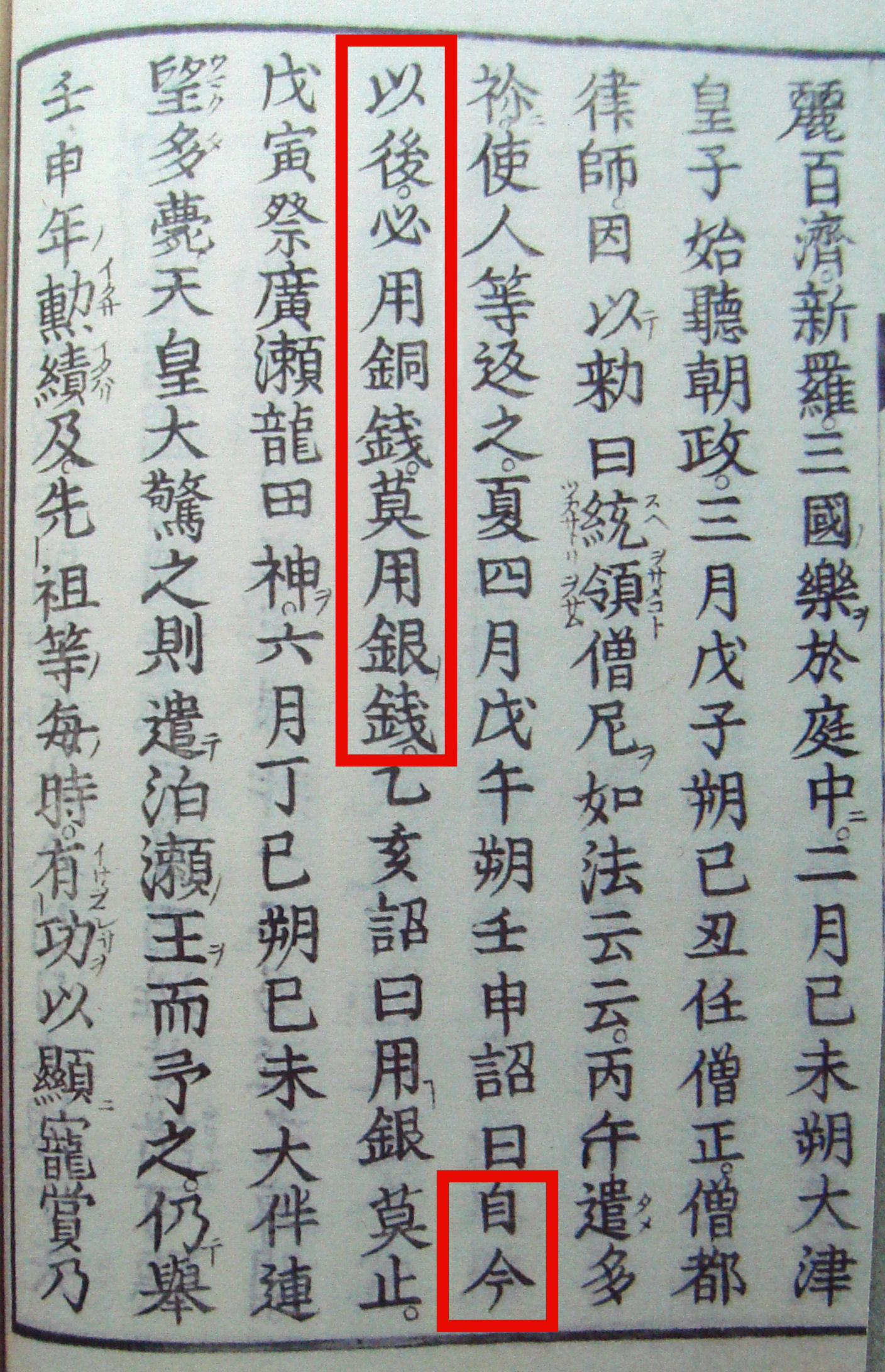
The Nihon Shoki entry of 15 April 683 CE (Tenmu 12th year), when an edict was issued mandating the use of copper coins rather than silver coins, an early mention of Japanese currency. Excerpt of the 11th century edition.

- Chapter 01: (First chapter of myths) Kami no Yo no Kami no maki.
- Chapter 02: (Second chapter of myths) Kami no Yo no Shimo no maki.
- Chapter 03: (Emperor Jimmu) Kan'yamato Iwarebiko no Sumeramikoto.
- Chapter 04:
  - (Emperor Suizei) Kamu Nunakawamimi no Sumeramikoto.
  - (Emperor Annei) Shikitsuhiko Tamatemi no Sumeramikoto.
  - (Emperor Itoku) Ōyamato Hikosukitomo no Sumeramikoto.
  - (Emperor Kōshō) Mimatsuhiko Sukitomo no Sumeramikoto.
  - (Emperor Kōan) Yamato Tarashihiko Kuni Oshihito no Sumeramikoto.
  - (Emperor Kōrei) Ōyamato Nekohiko Futoni no Sumeramikoto.
  - (Emperor Kōgen) Ōyamato Nekohiko Kunikuru no Sumeramikoto.
  - (Emperor Kaika) Wakayamato Nekohiko Ōbibi no Sumeramikoto.
- Chapter 05: (Emperor Sujin) Mimaki Iribiko Iniye no Sumeramikoto.
- Chapter 06: (Emperor Suinin) Ikume Iribiko Isachi no Sumeramikoto.
- Chapter 07:
  - (Emperor Keikō) Ōtarashihiko Oshirowake no Sumeramikoto.
  - (Emperor Seimu) Waka Tarashihiko no Sumeramikoto.
- Chapter 08: (Emperor Chūai) Tarashi Nakatsuhiko no Sumeramikoto.
- Chapter 09: (Empress Jingū) Okinaga Tarashihime no Mikoto.
- Chapter 10: (Emperor Ōjin) Homuda no Sumeramikoto.
- Chapter 11: (Emperor Nintoku) Ōsasagi no Sumeramikoto.
- Chapter 12:
  - (Emperor Richū) Izahowake no Sumeramikoto.
  - (Emperor Hanzei) Mitsuhawake no Sumeramikoto.
- Chapter 13:
  - (Emperor Ingyō) Oasazuma Wakugo no Sukune no Sumeramikoto.
  - (Emperor Ankō) Anaho no Sumeramikoto.
- Chapter 14: (Emperor Yūryaku) Ōhatsuse no Waka Takeru no Sumeramikoto.
- Chapter 15:
  - (Emperor Seinei) Shiraka no Take Hirokuni Oshi Waka Yamato Neko no Sumeramikoto.
  - (Emperor Kenzō) Woke no Sumeramikoto.
  - (Emperor Ninken) Oke no Sumeramikoto.
- Chapter 16: (Emperor Buretsu) Ohatsuse no Waka Sasagi no Sumeramikoto.
- Chapter 17: (Emperor Keitai) Ōdo no Sumeramikoto.
- Chapter 18:
  - (Emperor Ankan) Hirokuni Oshi Take Kanahi no Sumeramikoto.
  - (Emperor Senka) Take Ohirokuni Oshi Tate no Sumeramikoto.
- Chapter 19: (Emperor Kinmei) Amekuni Oshiharaki Hironiwa no Sumeramikoto.
- Chapter 20: (Emperor Bidatsu) Nunakakura no Futo Tamashiki no Sumeramikoto.
- Chapter 21:
  - (Emperor Yōmei) Tachibana no Toyohi no Sumeramikoto.
  - (Emperor Sushun) Hatsusebe no Sumeramikoto.
- Chapter 22: (Empress Suiko) Toyomike Kashikiya Hime no Sumeramikoto.
- Chapter 23: (Emperor Jomei) Okinaga Tarashi Hihironuka no Sumeramikoto.
- Chapter 24: (Empress Kōgyoku) Ame Toyotakara Ikashi Hitarashi no Hime no Sumeramikoto.
- Chapter 25: (Emperor Kōtoku) Ame Yorozu Toyohi no Sumeramikoto.
- Chapter 26: (Empress Saimei) Ame Toyotakara Ikashi Hitarashi no Hime no Sumeramikoto.
- Chapter 27: (Emperor Tenji) Ame Mikoto Hirakasuwake no Sumeramikoto.
- Chapter 28: (Emperor Tenmu, first chapter) Ama no Nunakahara Oki no Mahito no Sumeramikoto, Kami no maki.
- Chapter 29: (Emperor Tenmu, second chapter) Ama no Nunakahara Oki no Mahito no Sumeramikoto, Shimo no maki.
- Chapter 30: (Empress Jitō) Takamanohara Hirono Hime no Sumeramikoto.

== The Five Major Myths in the Nihon Shoki and Kojiki Summarized ==
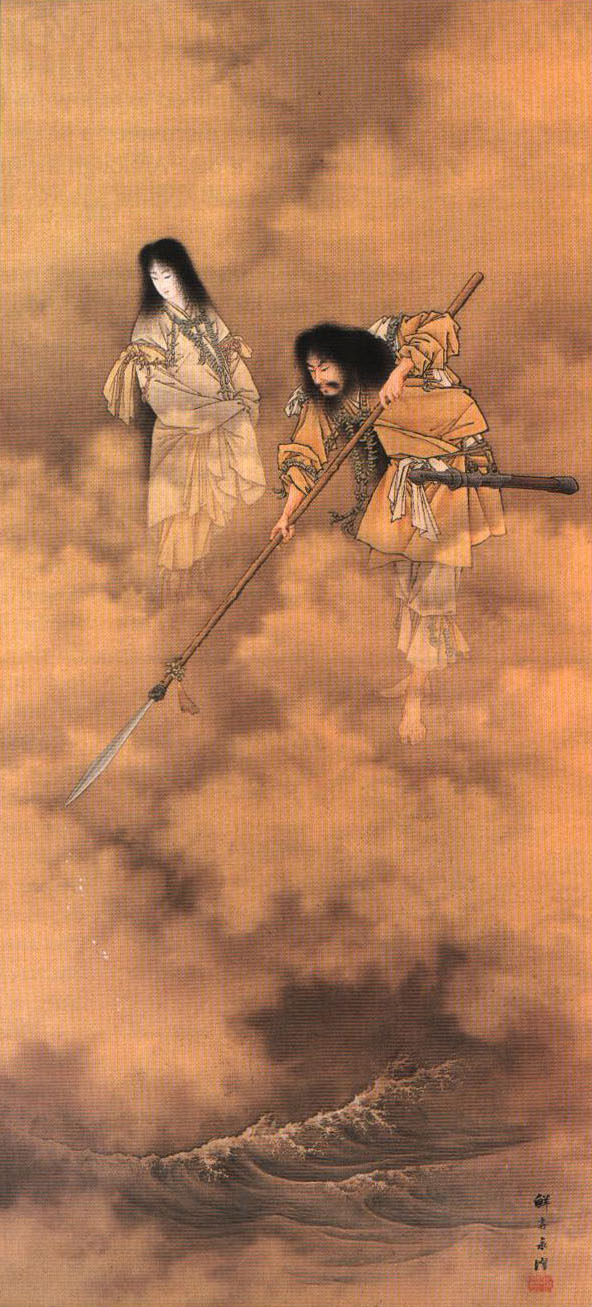
Kobayashi Eitaku, Izanagi and Izanami, c. 1885. From sv.wikipedia.org.

=== Myth 1: Izanagi and Izanami ===
The gods Izanagi and Izanami were given a mission to create the land at the beginning of the world. They formed the islands of Japan by moving the sea with a jeweled spear. Izanagi and Izanami engaged in marriage and gave birth to the deities and islands. Izanami died during childbirth to Kagutsuchi, the fire god. Consumed by grief, Izanagi travels to the underworld to meet Yomi to bring back his wife, Izanami. Horrified by the decay of his wife's corpse, Izanagi flees the underworld and seals the entrance to Yomi, causing the worlds of the living and the dead to be separated forever.

Main themes: Creation, death, and the separation between life and the underworld.

=== Myth 2: Amaterasu and Susanoo ===
Izanagi purifies himself after escaping the underworld and gives birth to three deities: Tsukuyomi, moon god; Amaterasu, sun goddess; and Susanoo, sea and storms god. Susanoo was acting destructively and killed the weaving maiden; this led Amaterasu to seek refuge in a place called Heavenly Rock Cave. As a result, Amaterasu's hiding caused the world to plunge into darkness. The gods devised a plan to trick Amaterasu into coming out. Susanoo was banished from heaven as a result of his crimes; he becomes a great hero, killing an 8 headed serpent and marrying Kushinadahime after saving her.

Main themes: Chaos and order, and cosmic harmony.

=== Myth 3: Ōkuninushi ===
Ōkuninushi is a deity associated closely with the earthly realm. By helping a white hare, it assisted Ōkuninushi in gaining the attention of Princess Yagamihime of Inaba. His brothers, being jealous, tried to kill him multiple times, but he was revived during each ordeal. Ōkuninushi's Mother told him to go to the underworld to seek refuge, and so he traveled there, meeting Susanoo. Susanoo did not like him and made Ōkuninushi undergo a series of dangerous trials. After surviving each trial, Ōkuninushi escapes with Susanoo's daughter, Suseribime-no-Mikoto. Later, Ōkuninushi rises to power and becomes the ruler of the earthly world.

Main themes: Perseverance, wisdom, and rightful ruler through hard work.

=== Myth 4: Ninigi ===
Goddess of the sun, Amaterasu makes her grandson Ninigi the ruler of earthy realm. After some hesitation, Ōkuninushi concedes authority to Ninigi, allowing him to descend from the heavens. Ninigi marries the princess of flowering trees, Kohohana-no-Sakuyabime, but rejects marriage with elder sister Iwanagahime, princess of the eternal rocks. As a result of this rejection, Ninigi's children will be forced to live short lives like flowers instead of the enduring rocks. Kohohana-no-Sakuyabime becomes pregnant, but Ninigi doubts her faithfulness. So, to prove her innocence, she seals herself in a birth hut and sets it on fire, during which she gives birth to 3 sons: Hosuseri-no-Mikoto, Hoori-no-Mikoto, and Hoderi-no-Mikoto. She emerges from the hut alive with her three children.

Main themes: Consequence, loyalty, and mortal nature of human life.

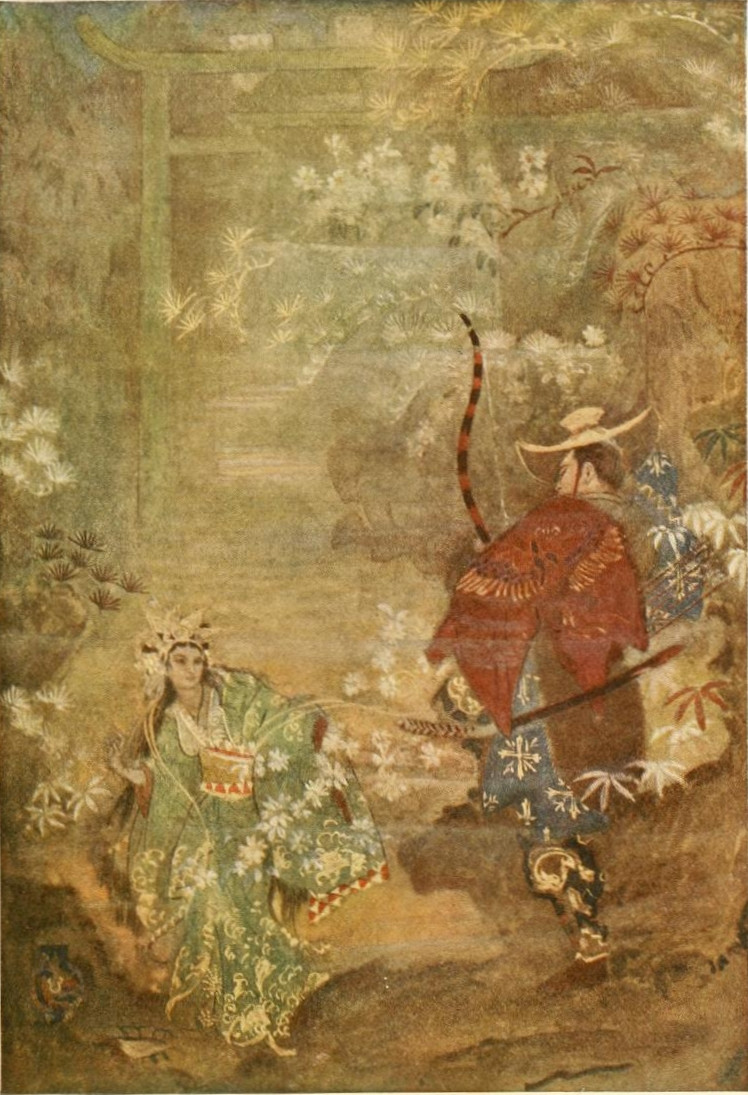
Description / Hoori meets the sea-king's daughter; Source / Davis, Frederick Hadland (1912), George G. Harrap; Author / Evelyn Paul (artist), F. Hadland Davis (book author)

=== Myth 5: Hoderi and Hoori ===
During an exchange of tools by the two brothers Hoori, a hunter, and Hoderi, a fisherman, Hoori loses His brother's fishing hook. As a result, Hoori searches for it deep within the sea. He finds the palace of the sea goddess and marries her daughter, Toyotamabime. As years passed, Hoori returned from the sea on the back of a wani with magical gifts and fortune. Hoderi is impoverished and succumbs to Hoori. During childbirth, Toyotamabime says for Hoori not to watch her, but he disobeys and sees her true form. Toyotamabime becomes ashamed and travels back to the ocean, leaving her child, Ugayafukiaezu-no-Mikoto, with his father. Ugayafukiaezu-no-Mikoto marries his aunt, Tamayoribime; their children become the start of the imperial lineage. They had four children, one of whom was Kamu-Yamato-Iwarebiko-no-Mikoto, the first Emperor of Japan.

Main themes: Divine Kingship and the connection between the heavenly and earthly worlds.

=== The Significance of the Five Major Myths ===
The five major myths found in the Kojiki and Nihon Shoki are important to Japan since it provides origin stories to the gods, the Japanese island, and the imperial family. The myths create a sacred history connecting the emperor to the sun goddess Amaterasu, allowing the emperor to claim divine right to rule. The myths support Shinto beliefs regarding the relationship between nature, humans, and the gods. They also provide guidance in teaching values of perseverance, courage, loyalty, and proper conduct. Lastly, the myths help establish a common story for the people of Japan, unifying them in similarity regarding the formation of their nation and the legitimacy of the imperial dynasty.

=== Overview of Themes Found in Nihon Shoki ===
| Chapters | Period | Main Themes |
|---|---|---|
| 1-2 | Mythological Age | Creation myths, gods, divine ancestry of the imperial family. |
| 3-16 | Legendary Early Emperors | Founding of Japan, hero narratives, dynasty-building, early state building. |
| 17-22 | Emergence of Historical Japan | Buddhism, continental influence, clan politics, administrative development. |
| 23-30 | Historical Period | Court politics, Taika Reforms, Korean diplomacy, Jinshin War, building of a centralized state. |

=== Reference ===
Tu, X., & Xie, W. (2021). The Kojiki/Nihon Shoki Mythology and Chinese Mythology: Theme, Structure, and Meaning. Religions (Basel, Switzerland), 12(10), 896. https://doi.org/10.3390/rel12100896

- Was used to gather themes across different chapters, summarize of the five major myths, and to inquiry about the myths of the Kojiki and Nihon Shoki.

== Process of compilation ==
=== Background ===
The background of the compilation of the Nihon Shoki is that Emperor Tenmu ordered 12 people, including Prince Kawashima, to edit the old history of the empire.

Shoku Nihongi notes that "先是一品舍人親王奉勅修日本紀。至是功成奏上。紀卅卷系圖一卷" in the part of May 720. It means "Up to that time, Prince Toneri had been compiling Nihongi on the orders of the emperor; he completed it, submitting 30 volumes of history and one volume of genealogy".

=== Sources ===
The Nihon Shoki is a synthesis of older documents, specifically on the records that had been continuously kept in the Yamato court since the sixth century. It also includes documents and folklore submitted by clans serving the court. Prior to Nihon Shoki, there were Tennōki and Kokki compiled by Prince Shōtoku and Soga no Umako, but as they were stored in Soga's residence, they were burned at the time of the Isshi Incident in July 645.

The compilers also appear to have drawn on Chinese historiographical models: the Han ji and Hou Han ji, each comprising thirty volumes, seem to have served as a structural model for the Nihon Shoki's own thirty volumes, and the compilers likely consulted the Yiwen leiju, a hundred-volume Tang-era encyclopedia compiled by Ouyang Xun. The court nonetheless chose the title Nihon ("origin of the sun") rather than the Chinese term Wa, asserting Japan's independence from China even while drawing on Chinese models.

The work's contributors refer to various sources which do not exist today. Among those sources, three Baekje documents (Kudara-ki, etc.) are cited mainly for the purpose of recording diplomatic affairs. Textual criticism shows that scholars fleeing the destruction of the Baekje to Yamato wrote these histories and the authors of the Nihon Shoki heavily relied upon those sources. This must be taken into account in relation to statements referring to old historic rivalries between the ancient Korean kingdoms of Silla, Goguryeo, and Baekje.

Some other sources are cited anonymously as aru fumi (一書; "some document"), in order to keep alternative records for specific incidents.

== Exaggeration of reign lengths ==
Most scholars agree that the purported founding date of Japan (660 BCE) and the earliest emperors of Japan are mythical. This does not necessarily imply that the persons referred to did not exist, merely that there is insufficient material available for further verification and study. Dates in the Nihon Shoki before the late 7th century were likely recorded using the Genka calendar system.

For those monarchs, and also for the Emperors Ōjin and Nintoku, the lengths of reign are likely to have been exaggerated in order to make the origins of the imperial family sufficiently ancient to satisfy numerological expectations. It is widely believed that the epoch of 660 BCE was chosen because it is a "xīn-yǒu" year in the sexagenary cycle, which according to Taoist beliefs was an appropriate year for a revolution to take place. As Taoist theory also groups together 21 sexagenary cycles into one unit of time, it is assumed that the compilers of Nihon Shoki assigned the year 601 (a "xīn-yǒu" year in which Prince Shotoku's reformation took place) as a "modern revolution" year, and consequently recorded 660 BCE, 1260 years prior to that year, as the founding epoch.

=== Kesshi Hachidai ===
For the eight emperors of Chapter 4, only the years of birth and reign, year of naming as Crown Prince, names of consorts, and locations of tomb are recorded. They are called the Kesshi Hachidai ("欠史八代, "eight generations lacking history") because no legends (or a few, as quoted in Nihon Ōdai Ichiran) are associated with them. Some studies support the view that these emperors were invented to push Jimmu's reign further back to the year 660 BCE. Nihon Shoki itself somewhat elevates the "tenth" emperor Sujin, recording that he was called the Hatsu-Kuni-Shirasu ("御肇国: first nation-ruling) emperor.

== Influences ==
The tale of Urashima Tarō is developed from the brief mention in Nihon Shoki (Emperor Yūryaku Year 22) that a certain child of Urashima visited Horaisan and saw wonders. The later tale has plainly incorporated elements from the famous anecdote of "Luck of the Sea and Luck of the Mountains" (Hoderi and Hoori) found in Nihon Shoki. The later developed Urashima tale contains the Rip Van Winkle motif, so some may consider it an early example of fictional time travel.

The 11th Chapter also mentions Ryomen Sukuna in some way.

== Editions ==
=== English translations ===
- Aston, William George (1896). Nihongi: Chronicles of Japan from the Earliest Times to A.D. 697. London: Kegan Paul, Trench, Trübner & Co. OCLC 9486539. vol. 1, vol. 2

=== Prints ===
- Nihongi volume 1-30 Publication date unknown. Preface dated Keichō 15 (1610). Waseda University Library collection
- Nihon Shoki volume 1-2 Publication date unknown. Waseda University Library collection

=== Typed prints ===
- 経済雑誌社 (1907). Keiza zasshisha (経済雑誌社) (ed.). Nihon Shoki 日本書紀. Kokushi taikei (國史大系) (in Japanese). Vol. 1. Tokyo, Japan: Keiza zasshisha (経済雑誌社). doi:10.11501/991091. OCLC 21967145. ndldm:991091.
- 佐伯, 有義, 1867-1945 (1940) [1928]. Saeki, Ariyoshi (ed.). Nihon Shoki vol.1 日本書紀 上巻. Rikkokushi (六國史) (in Japanese). Vol. 1 (増補版 ed.). Tokyo, Japan: Asahi Shimbun Company. doi:10.11501/1172831. OCLC 22150362. ndldm:1172831.; vol.2

=== Modern Japanese translations ===
- Ujiya (宇治谷), Tsutomu (孟) (1988). Nihon shoki (日本書紀). Vol. 上. Kodansha. ISBN 4-06-158833-8.; Vol.下:ISBN 4-06-158834-6

== See also ==
- Hiromichi Mori
- Historiographical Institute of the University of Tokyo
- Historiography of Japan
- Iki no Hakatoko no Sho
- International Research Center for Japanese Studies
- Japanese Historical Text Initiative
- Shaku Nihongi
- William George Aston
