= 891 =

Calendar year

891 in various calendars
Gregorian calendar	891; DCCCXCI
Ab urbe condita	1644
Armenian calendar	340; ԹՎ ՅԽ
Assyrian calendar	5641
Balinese saka calendar	812–813
Bengali calendar	297–298
Berber calendar	1841
Buddhist calendar	1435
Burmese calendar	253
Byzantine calendar	6399–6400
Chinese calendar	庚戌年 (Metal Dog); 3588 or 3381 — to — 辛亥年 (Metal Pig); 3589 or 3382
Coptic calendar	607–608
Discordian calendar	2057
Ethiopian calendar	883–884
Hebrew calendar	4651–4652
- Hindu calendars
Vikram Samvat	947–948
Shaka Samvat	812–813
Kali Yuga	3991–3992
Holocene calendar	10891
Iranian calendar	269–270
Islamic calendar	277–278
Japanese calendar	Kanpyō 3 (寛平３年)
Javanese calendar	789–790
Julian calendar	891; DCCCXCI
Korean calendar	3224
Minguo calendar	1021 before ROC 民前1021年
Nanakshahi calendar	−577
Seleucid era	1202/1203 AG
Thai solar calendar	1433–1434
Tibetan calendar	阳金狗年 (male Iron-Dog); 1017 or 636 or −136 — to — 阴金猪年 (female Iron-Pig); 1018 or 637 or −135

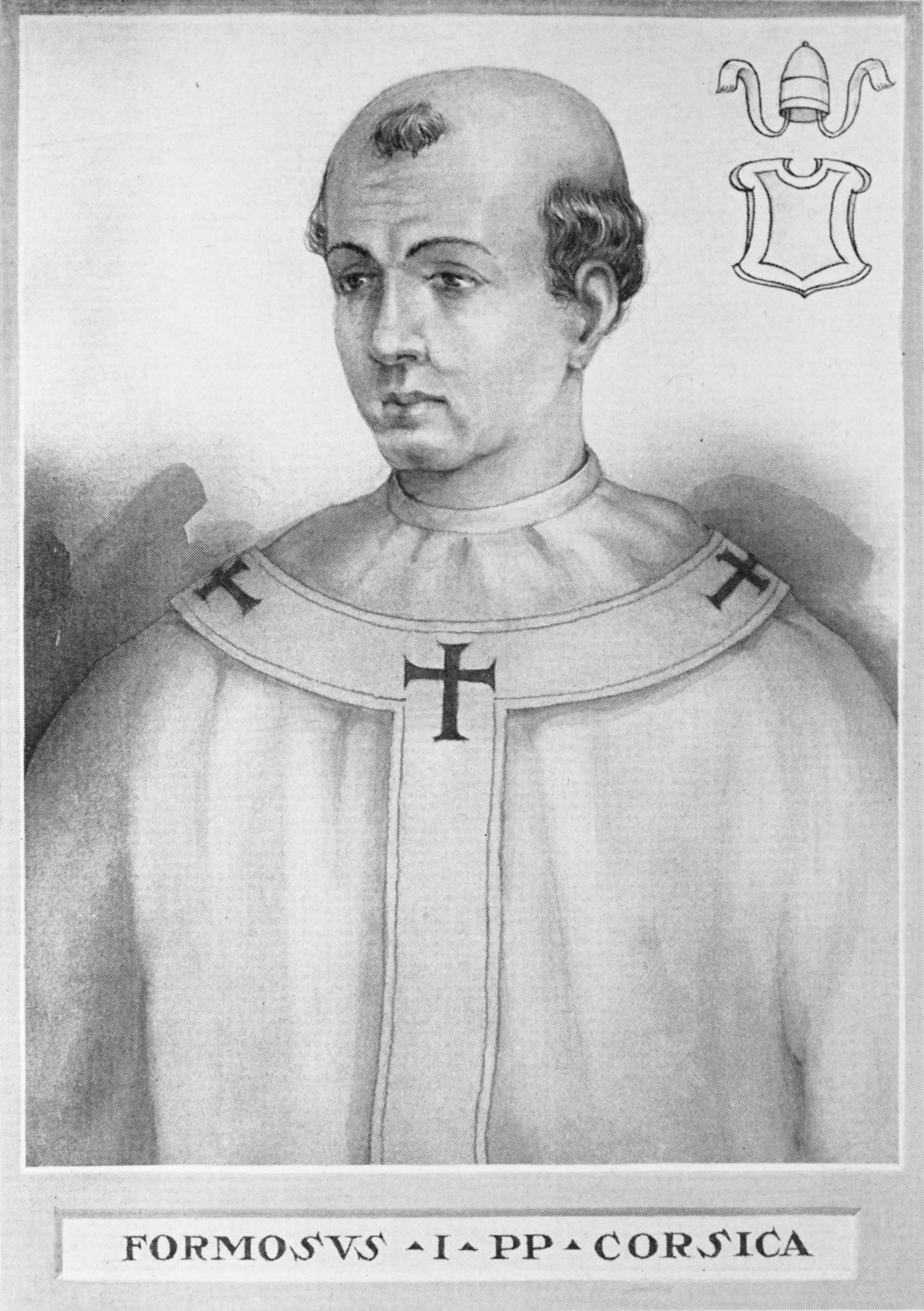
Pope Formosus (c. 816–896)

Year 891 (DCCCXCI) was a common year starting on Friday of the Julian calendar.

== Events ==
=== By place ===
==== Europe ====
- February 21 – Guy III, duke of Spoleto, is crowned Holy Roman Emperor by Pope Stephen V. His son Lambert is proclaimed king of Italy, at the capital of Pavia in Lombardy.
- Summer – Orso, Lombard prince of Benevento, is deposed after the capture of Benevento by the Byzantines. Benevento becomes the capital of the thema of Longobardia.
- Battle of Leuven: Viking raiders on the Dyle River (near Leuven), in modern-day Belgium, suffer a crushing defeat by Frankish forces under King Arnulf of Carinthia.

==== Emirate of Córdoba ====
- Muslim forces led by Abdullah ibn Muhammad al-Umawi, Umayyad emir of Córdoba, defeat the rebel leader Umar ibn Hafsun at Poley, in Al-Andalus (modern Spain).

==== Arabian Empire (Caliphate) ====
- June 2 – Al-Muwaffaq, an Abbasid prince and Commander-in-chief, dies at the capital of Baghdad. His son Al-Mu'tadid is recognized as regent, and second heir of the Abbasid Caliphate.

==== Japan ====
- February 25 – Fujiwara no Mototsune, a Japanese statesman, dies. In his lifetime, he had forced the resignation of Emperor Yōzei and become head of the Fujiwara clan.

=== By topic ===
==== Religion ====
- September 14 – Pope Stephen V dies after a 6-year reign. He is succeeded by Formosus, former cardinal bishop of Portus, as the 111th pope of the Catholic Church.

== Births ==
- Abd al-Rahman III, Umayyad caliph (or 889)
- Ali ibn Buya, founder of the Buyid Dynasty (or 892)
- Gao Conghui, prince and ruler of Jingnan (d. 948)
- Lin Ding, Chinese official and chancellor (d. 944)
- Yuan Dezhao, Chinese chancellor (d. 968)

== Deaths ==
- February 25 – Fujiwara no Mototsune, Japanese regent (b. 836)
- June 2 – Al-Muwaffaq, Abbasid prince and regent (b. 842)
- June 25 – Sunderolt, archbishop of Mainz
- September 14 – Stephen V, pope of the Catholic Church
- October 23 – Yazaman al-Khadim, Abbasid emir
- Bernard, illegitimate son of Charles the Fat (or 892)
- Chen Yan, Chinese warlord and governor
- Enchin, Japanese Buddhist monk (b. 814)
- Gu Yanlang, Chinese warlord and governor
- Isma'il ibn Bulbul, Abbasid official and vizier
- Mutimir of Serbia, ruler of Principality of Serbia
- Wang Hui, chancellor of the Tang Dynasty
