= Kanpyō Gyoki =

Diary of the Japanese Emperor Uda

The Kanpyō Gyoki (寛平御記, Imperial diary of the Kanpyō era) or Uda tennō gyoki (宇多天皇御記, Imperial diary of Emperor Uda) is a diary written in variant Chinese (hentai-kanbun) by Emperor Uda. It is the oldest extant Japanese court diary. Together with Murakami tennō gyoki (村上天皇御記, Emperor Murakami's diary) and Daigo tennō gyoki (醍醐天皇御記, Emperor Daigo's diary) it comprises the collection known as Sandai Gyoki (三代御記, The Diaries of the Three Reigns).

== Description ==
Uda's diary is valued as a source of information on court practices during his reign and about the antagonism between him and the Fujiwara clan. In addition it provides glimpses into the private life and fears of Emperor Uda. In an entry for the year 889, titled A Dream denied, Uda reveals that at the age of 17 he wanted to become a Buddhist priest and did not anticipate ever to become an emperor. On his father's (Emperor Kōkō) enthronement in 884 he was "shuddering with fear". In an entry for the second month, sixth day of the same year (March 11, 889) titled For the Love of a Cat, Uda gives a detailed and humorous description of the physical characteristics of his cat and goes on to ascribe her a yin and yang spirituality.

== History ==
According to historical records, ten fascicles of the diary were known in 1313. Parts of the work were lost during the Ōnin War (1467–77) and what remains of it today was compiled in the late Edo period by Nakatsu Hirochika (中津広昵) from citations in secondary texts and extended by Wada Hidematsu (和田英松). In the early 20th century it was published in Zoku Zoku Gunsho Ruijū 5.1–14. The extant fragments cover the period from 887 to 890 and occupy about 14 pages in modern printed editions.

== See also ==
- List of Japanese classic texts
