= Emperor Yōzei =

Emperor of Japan from 876 to 884

Emperor Yōzei 陽成天皇
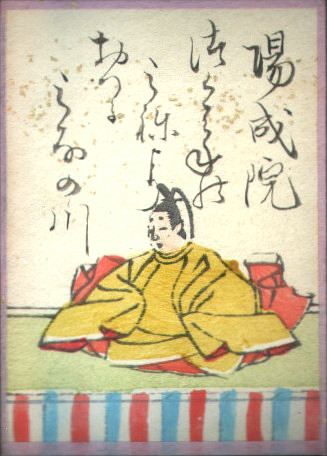
- From the Ogura Hyakunin Isshu

Emperor of Japan
- Reign: 18 December 876 – 4 March 884
- Enthronement: 20 January 877
- Predecessor: Seiwa
- Successor: Kōkō
- Born: 2 January 869 染殿第（Somedonodai）
- Died: 23 October 949 (aged 80); Reizei-in palace (冷泉院)
- Burial: Kaguragaoka no Higashi no misasagi (神楽岡東陵) (Kyōto)
- Issue: Prince Motoyoshi; Prince Motonaga; Prince Mototoshi; Princess Chōshi; Princess Genshi; Prince Motohira; Minamoto no Kiyokage; Minamoto no Kiyotō; Minamoto no Kiyomi
Posthumous name
- Tsuigō: Emperor Yōzei (陽成天皇)
- House: Imperial House of Japan
- Father: Emperor Seiwa
- Mother: Fujiwara no Takaiko

Emperor Yōzei (陽成天皇, Yōzei-tennō; 2 January 869 – 23 October 949) was the 57th emperor of Japan, according to the traditional order of succession. Yōzei's reign spanned the years from 876 through 884. Before his ascension to the Chrysanthemum Throne, his personal name (his imina) was Sadaakira Shinnō (貞明親王). In ancient Japan, there were four noble clans, the Gempeitōkitsu (源平藤橘). One of these clans, the Minamoto clan (源氏) are also known as Genji, and of these, the Yōzei Genji (陽成源氏) are descended from the 57th emperor Yōzei.

== Biography ==
Yōzei was the oldest son of Emperor Seiwa. His mother was the Empress Fujiwara no Takaiko, who was also known after Seiwa's abdication as the Nijō empress. Yōzei's mother was the sister of Fujiwara no Mototsune, who would figure prominently in the young emperor's life.

Yōzei was appointed Crown Prince at less than three months old and, at the age of nine, in November 876, he was raised to the throne on the abdication of his father Emperor Seiwa. This marked the arrival of another underage emperor following his father, and his maternal uncle, Fujiwara no Mototsune, became regent. At the beginning of his reign, ex-Emperor Seiwa and Mototsune cooperated in governing, but soon after the death of Emperor Seiwa in 880, the relationship between Yōzei and especially his mother, Fujiwara no Takaiko, and Mototsune apparently deteriorated, and from August 883, despite his titles as regent and Daijō-daijin, Mototsune began refusing to attend court, which caused considerable political turmoil. The situation came to a head in 883, when Minamoto no Yasu (Yōzei's foster brother) was suddenly beaten to death while attending to the emperor in the palace. The circumstances of the incident and the perpetrator remain unknown and are not recorded, but there were rumors that Yōzei was involved. Most historians to date believe that Yōzei himself caused the incident, whether intentionally or accidentally, or at least had some involvement. Yōzei is said to have mental instability and to have exhibited fits of anger and cruelty after acceding to his position at a tender young age; however, it is uncertain how many of the horrific stories about his abnormal behavior were true and which were later fabrications. In any event, Mototsune used the incident as a pretext to forcibly depose Yōzei and to purge the court of his adherents.

Yōzei became the retired emperor and his deposition was publicly presented as a voluntary abdication due to illness. Somewhat contradictory to his reputation, Yōzei was a skilled poet, noted for waka during his later years. His only surviving poem is a waka expressed his growing love by superimposing the image of the flow of the river, which was included in the Gosen Wakashū and later included as poem number 13 in the Ogura Hyakunin Isshu

He lived a long life, his 65 years as retired emperor is the longest in history, far surpassing the 50 years of the second-place Emperor Go-Mizunoo. He outlived Emperor Daigo, who succeeded Emperor Uda, and witnessed the succession to the throne through the lineage of Emperors Suzaku, Murakami, and Kōkō. Yōzei had nine Imperial children, born after he had abdicated. Two of these sons, Minamoto no Kiyokage and Prince Motoyoshi, who served as court nobles from the Daigo to the Murakami era, were noted poets.

== Grave of Emperor Yōzei ==
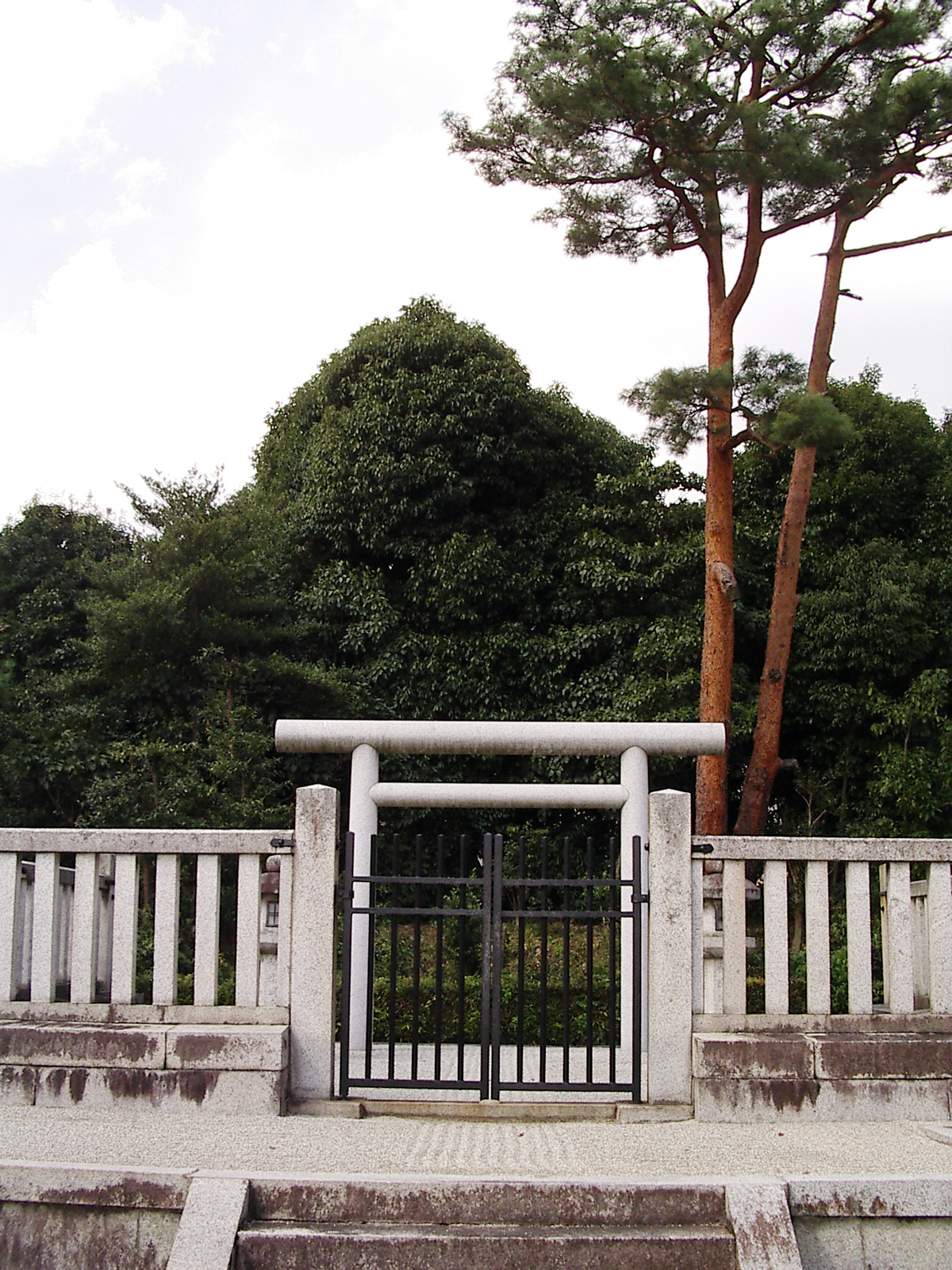
Memorial Shinto shrine and mausoleum honoring Emperor Yōzei, Kyoto

The grave of Emperor Yōzei has been proclaimed by the Imperial Household Agency as a location in Jōdoji Shinnyo-chō, Sakyō-ku, Kyoto formally designated as the Kaguragaoka no Higashi no misasagi (神楽岡東陵).

According to the Nihon Kiryaku, Volume 4) Emperor Yōzei died at the Reizei-in. That night, his coffin was moved to the temple of Engaku-ji. However, from the Kamakura period, the site of his grave became unknown. During the Edo period's Bunkyu Restoration of Imperial Mausoleums in 1862-1863, a dilapidated burial mound in the garden behind a house in Jōdoji Shinnyo-chō was selected as the probable site, and rebuilt as an octagonal mound, with the southwest facing the front, and an octagonal dry moat.

== Events of Yōzei's life ==
Yōzei was made emperor when he was an immature, unformed young boy.

- 869 (Jōgan 10): Yōzei was born, and he is named Seiwa's heir in the following year.
- 18 December 876 (Jōgan 18, 29th day of the 11th month): In the 18th year of Emperor Seiwa's reign (清和天皇十八年), he ceded his throne to his son, which meant that the young child received the succession (senso). Shortly thereafter, Emperor Yōzei formally acceded to the throne (sokui).
- 20 January 877 (Gangyō 1, 3rd day of the 1st month): Yōzei was formally enthroned at age 8; and the beginning of a new nengō was proclaimed. However, the new residence being constructed for the emperor had not been completed; and initially, he had to live elsewhere in the palace compound.
- 877 (Gangyō 1, 2nd month): Ambassadors from Baekje arrived in the province of Izumo; but they were turned back.
- 877 (Gangyō 1, 6th month): There was a great drought; and sacrifices were made at the temples of Hachiman, Kamo and other temples in Ise Province. Eventually, it rained.
- 883 (Gangyō 7, 1st month): In his early teens, Yōzei often spent time alone; and sometimes he would feed live frogs to snakes so that he could watch the reptile swallowing; or sometimes, he would find pleasure in setting dogs and monkeys to fight. In time, these amusements became more dangerous. He himself executed criminals. When he became angry, he sometimes chased after those who dared speak up; and he sometimes tried to use his sword. Fujiwara no Mototsune, the Kanpaku, used every possible opportunity to turn Yōzei towards more seemly conduct, but the emperor closed his ears to all remonstrances.
- 884 (Gangyō 8, 1st month): The extravagant and dangerous habits of the emperor continued unabated. At one point, Mototsune came to the court and discovered that Yōzei had arranged a bizarre scenario for his diversion: He ordered some men to climb high into trees, and then he ordered others to use sharp lances to poke at these men in trees until they fell to their deaths. This extraordinary event convinced Mototsune that the emperor was too "undignified" to reign. Mototsune reluctantly realized that someone needed to devise a strategy for deposing the emperor. Shortly thereafter, Mototsune approached Yōzei and remarked that it must be boring to be so often alone, and then Mototsune suggested that the emperor might be amused by a horse race. Yōzei was attracted to this proposition, and he eagerly encouraged Mototsune to set a time and place for the event. It was decided that this special amusement for the emperor would take place on the 4th day of the 2nd month of Gangyō 8.
- 4 March 884 (Gangyō 8, 4th day of the 2nd month): The pretext of a special horse race enticed the emperor to leave his palace. Yōzei traveled in a carriage which was quickly surrounded by a heavy guard. The carriage was redirected to Yo seí in palace (Yang tchhing yuan) at Ni zio, a town situated a short distance to the south-west of Miyako. Mototsune confronted the emperor, explaining that his demented behavior made him incapable of reigning, and that he was being dethroned. At this news, Yōzei cried sincerely, which did attract feelings of compassion from those who witnessed his contrition.

According to very scanty information from the Imperial archives, including sources such as Rikkokushi, and Nihon Sandai Jitsuroku, Emperor Yōzei murdered one of his retainers, an action that caused massive scandal in the Heian court. Japanese society during the Heian era was very sensitive to issues of "pollution," both spiritual and personal. Deaths (especially killing animals or people) were the worst acts of pollution possible, and warranted days of seclusion in order to purify oneself. Since the Emperor was seen as a divine figure and linked to the deities, pollution of such extreme degree committed by the highest source was seen as extremely ruinous. Many of the high court officials construed Emperor Yōzei's actions as exceeding the bounds of acceptable behavior, and as justifiable cause for the emperor to be forcibly deposed.

In Kitabatake Chikafusa's 14th-century account of Emperor Yōzei's reign, the emperor is described as possessing a "violent disposition" and unfit to be a ruler. In the end, when Fujiwara no Mototsune, who was Sesshō (regent for the child-emperor, 876–880), Kampaku (chief advisor or first secretary for the emperor, 880–890), and Daijō Daijin (Great Minister of the Council of State), decided that Yōzei should be removed from the throne, he discovered that there was general agreement amongst the kuge that this was a correct and necessary decision.

Yōzei was succeeded by his father's uncle, Emperor Kōkō; and in the reign of Kōkō's son, Emperor Uda, the madness re-visited the tormented former emperor:

- 889 (Kanpyō 1, 10th month): The former emperor Yōzei was newly attacked by the mental illness. Yōzei would enter the palace and address courtiers he would meet with the greatest rudeness. He became increasingly furious. He garroted women with the strings of musical instruments and then threw the bodies into a lake. While riding on horseback, he directed his mount to run over people. Sometimes he simply disappeared into the mountains where he chased wild boars and Sika deer, which in Shinto cosmology were considered to be messengers of the kami.

Yōzei lived in retirement until the age of 80.

=== Kugyō ===
Kugyō (公卿) is a collective term for the very few most powerful men attached to the court of the Emperor of Japan in pre-Meiji eras.

In general, this elite group included only three to four men at a time. These were hereditary courtiers whose experience and background would have brought them to the pinnacle of a life's career. During Yozei's reign, this apex of the Daijō-kan included:

- Sesshō, Fujiwara no Mototsune (藤原基経), 836–891.
- Kampaku, Fujiwara no Mototsune (藤原基経).
- Daijō-daijin, Fujiwara no Mototsune.
- Sadaijin, Minamoto no Tōru (源融).
- Udaijin, Fujiwara no Mototsune.
- Udaijin, Minamoto no Masaru (源多).
- Naidaijin (not appointed)
- Dainagon, Minamoto no Masaru (源多).
- Dainagon, Minafuchi no Toshina (南淵年名), 807–877.

== Eras of Yōzei's reign ==
The years of Yōzei's reign are more specifically identified by more than one era name or nengō. During this time, the tradition of naming eras because of good omens changed. Instead, the name of an era might be chosen to limit the effects of something bad.

- Jōgan (859–877)
- Gangyō (877–885)

== Consorts and children ==
Consort (Hi): Imperial Princess Kanshin (簡子内親王; d. 914), Emperor Kōkō's second daughter

Consort (Hi): Imperial Princess Yasuko (綏子内親王; d. 925), Emperor Kōkō's third daughter

Consort (Hi): Princess Kyoko (姣子女王; d. 914), Imperial Prince Koretada's daughter

- Imperial Prince Motonaga (元長親王; 901–976)
- Fourth Son: Imperial Prince Mototoshi (元利親王; d. 964)
- Imperial Princess Chōshi (長子内親王; d. 922)
- Imperial Princess Genshi (儼子内親王; d. 930)

Court lady: Fujiwara no Tōnaga's daughter

- Second Son: Imperial Prince Motoyoshi (元良親王)
- Imperial Prince Motohira (元平親王; d. 958)

Court lady: daughter of Ki clan

- First son: Minamoto no Kiyokage (源清蔭; 884–950), Dainagon 948–950

Court lady: Tomo Yasuhira's daughter

- Minamoto no Kiyomi (源清鑒; d. 936)

Court lady: daughter of Saeki clan

- Minamoto no Kiyotō (源清遠; d. 912)

== Ancestry ==
Ancestors of Emperor Yōzei

8. Emperor Ninmyō (808–850)
4. Emperor Montoku (826–858)
9. Fujiwara no Junshi (809–871)
2. Emperor Seiwa (850–878)
10. Fujiwara no Yoshifusa (804–872)
5. Fujiwara no Akirakeiko (829–900)
11. Minamoto no Kiyohime (810–856)
1. Emperor Yōzei
12. Fujiwara no Fuyutsugu (775–826)
6. Fujiwara no Nagara (802–856)
13. Fujiwara no Mitsuko (781–828)
3. Fujiwara no Takaiko (842–910)
14. Fujiwara no Fusatsugu
7. Fujiwara no Otoharu

== See also ==
- Emperor of Japan
- List of Emperors of Japan
- Imperial cult
- Deer (mythology)
- Emperor Go-Yōzei

== Notes ==
Japanese Imperial kamon—a stylized chrysanthemum blossom

Regnal titles
Preceded by Emperor Seiwa	Emperor of Japan: Yōzei; 876–884	Succeeded by Emperor Kōkō
