= Emperor Seiwa =

Emperor of Japan from 858 to 876

Emperor Seiwa 清和天皇
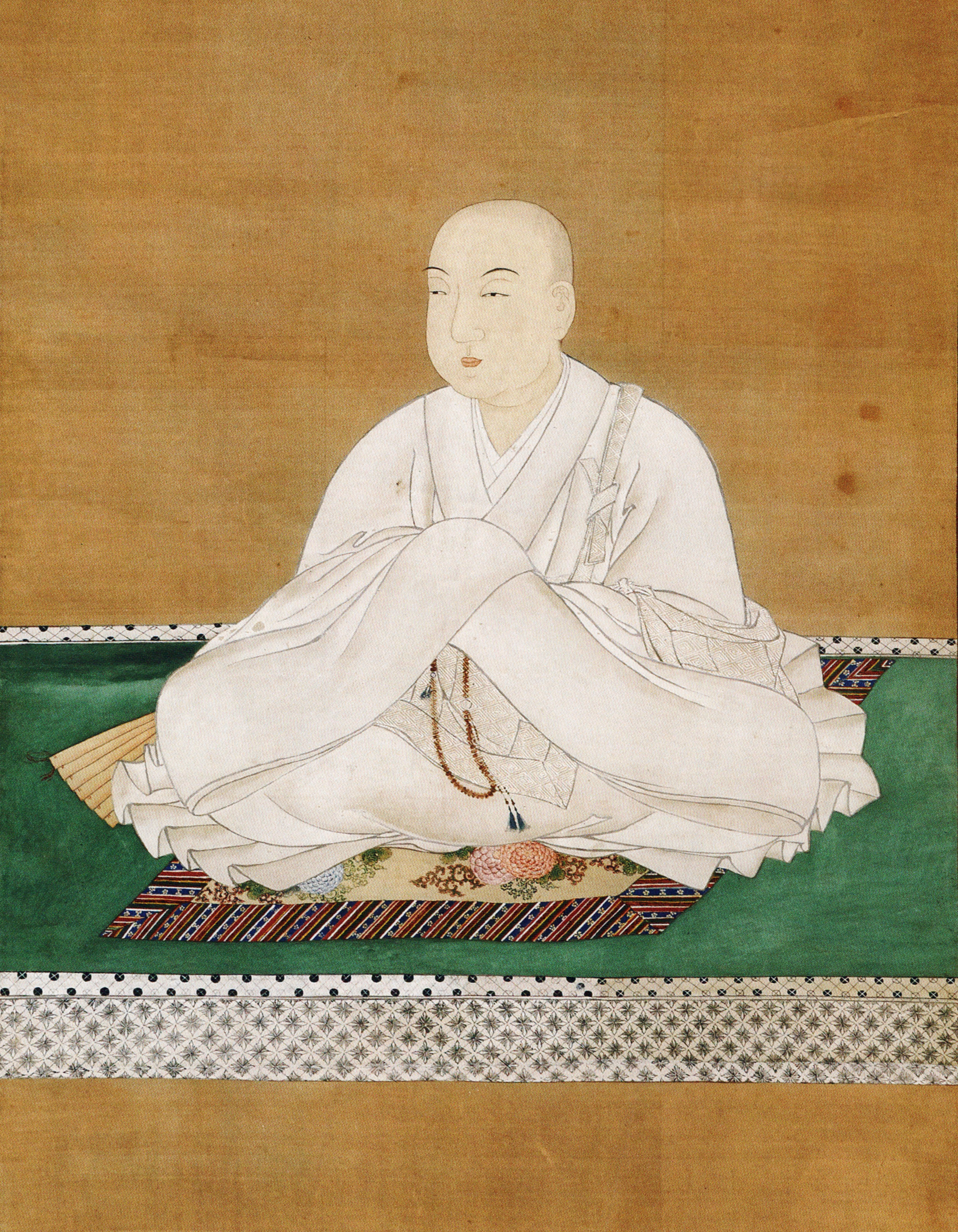

Emperor of Japan
- Reign: October 7, 858 – December 18, 876
- Enthronement: December 15, 858
- Predecessor: Montoku
- Successor: Yōzei
- Born: May 10, 850; Ichijo-tei palace (一条第)
- Died: January 7, 881 (aged 30); Heian Kyō (Kyōto)
- Burial: Minooyama no misasagi (水尾山陵) (Kyoto)
- Issue Among others...: Emperor Yōzei
Posthumous name
- Tsuigō: Emperor Seiwa (清和天皇)
- House: Imperial House of Japan
- Father: Emperor Montoku
- Mother: Fujiwara no Akirakeiko

Emperor Seiwa (清和天皇, Seiwa-tennō; May 10, 850 – January 7, 881) was the 56th emperor of Japan, according to the traditional order of succession. Seiwa's reign spanned the years from 858 through 876. He was the ancestor of the Seiwa Genji, who later became the leaders of the warrior class.

Before his ascension to the Chrysanthemum Throne, his personal name (his imina) was Korehito (惟仁), the first member of the Imperial house to be personally named "-hito" 仁. One meaning of the character 仁 is the Confucian concept of ren. Later it has been a tradition to name the personal name of all male members of the Imperial family this way. He was also known as emperor as Mizunoo-no-mikado or Minoo-tei.

== Biography ==
Emperor Seiwa was born four days after his father, Emperor Montoku, ascended the throne. He was the fourth son, following his half-brothers, Princes Korechika, Korejo, and Korehiko. However, under the influence of his maternal grandfather, Fujiwara no Yoshifusa, and against the wishes of his father, he displaced his older siblings and was proclaimed Crown Prince at the age of 8. In 858, upon the death of Emperor Montoku, he ascended to the throne at the age of nine. The ailing Emperor Montoku attempted to have Prince Korechika, six years his senior, succeed to the throne as a temporary successor, but this did not materialize. Due to his young age, Fujiwara no Yoshifusa held all political power as regent.

In 866, the Ōtenmon Incident occurred, centered on the destruction of the main gate (Ōtenmon) of the Official Compound (朝堂院, Chōdō-in) of the Imperial Palace. Per the Nihon Sandai Jitsuroku, Fujiwara no Yoshifusa was able to use this incident to purge all of his political rivals and secure the formal title of Sesshō.

In 876, Emperor Seiwa abdicated in favor of his eldest son, the 9-year-old Prince Sadaakira (Emperor Yōzei), and became a retired emperor. Two and a half years later, in May 879, he became a monk, and from October of that year, he began a pilgrimage around the Kinai region. In March of the following year, he entered Mizuo in Tanba Province and undertook intense ascetic practices involving fasting. He established Mizuo as his place of seclusion and, while constructing a new temple, fell ill at the Seikakan, the villa of Minister of the Left Minamoto no Tōru. He was moved to Engaku-ji in Awata and later died. He was 31 years old.

== Grave of Emperor Seiwa ==
Emperor Seiwa relocated due to illness to the Awata-in villa (which later became the temple of Engaku-ji) and was cremated at Kami-Awatayama in Rakuto (eastern Kyoto) on the hill behind Konkaikōmyō-ji, and buried in Mizuo in Ukyō-ku, Kyoto according to his wishes. His tomb is designated by the Imperial Household Agency as the Minooyama no Misasagi (清和天皇陵) or Seiwa Tennō Ryō. From the site of his tomb the Emperor Seiwa is sometimes referred to as the Emperor Mizunoo (水尾帝, Mizunoo-tei). It is one of the Heian period imperial tombs whose location is almost certainly confirmed; however, per the emperor's wishes, it was only a simple burial with no mausoleum and was not listed in the Engishiki's listing of imperial mausoleums. During the Edo period, the current site was repaired during the Bunkyu Restoration of Imperial Mausoleums in 1862-1863, at which time the current circular mound with a gate and moat were constructed.

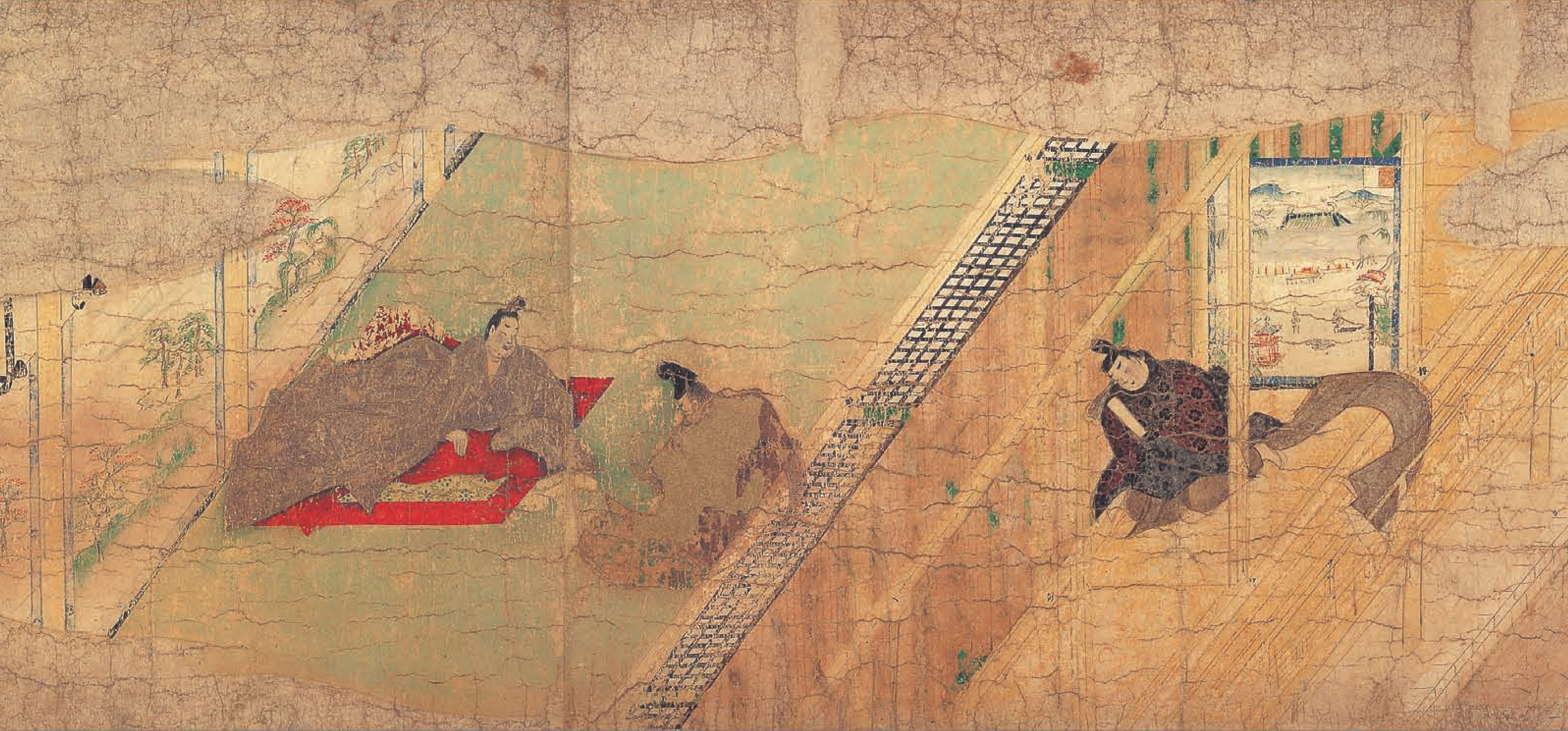
Emperor Seiwa (left) inside Seiryoden, Heian Palace.

The kami of Emperor Seiwa is venerated at the Seiwatennō-sha, a Shinto shrine near the mausoleum.

=== Events of Seiwa's life ===
Originally under the guardianship of his maternal grandfather Fujiwara no Yoshifusa, he displaced Imperial Prince Koretaka (惟喬親王) as Crown Prince. Upon the death of his father in 858, Emperor Montoku, he became Emperor at the age of 9, but the real power was held by his grandfather, Yoshifusa.

- 7 October 858 (Ten'an 2, 27th day of the 8th month): In the 8th year of Montoku-tennō's reign (文徳天皇8年), the emperor died; and the succession (senso) was received by his son. Shortly thereafter, Emperor Seiwa is said to have acceded to the throne (sokui).
- 15 December 858 (Ten'an 2, 7th day of the 11th month): The emperor's official announcement of his enthronement at age 9 was accompanied by the appointment of his grandfather as regent (sesshō). This is the first time that this high honor has been accorded to a member of the Fujiwara family, and it is also the first example in Japan of the accession of an heir who is too young to be emperor. The proclamation of the beginning of Seiwa's reign was made at the Kotaijingu at Ise Province and at all the tombs of the imperial family.
- 859 (Jōgan 1, 1st month): All New Year's festivities were suspended because of the period of national mourning for the death of Emperor Montoku.
- 859 (Jōgan 1): Construction began on the Iwashimizu Shrine near Heian-kyō. This shrine honors Hachiman, the Shinto war god.
- 869 (Jōgan 10): Yōzei was born, and he was named Seiwa's heir in the following year.
- 876 (Jōgan 17, 11th month): In the 18th year of Seiwa-tennō's reign (清和天皇18年), the emperor ceded his throne to his five-year-old son, which meant that the young child received the succession (senso). Shortly thereafter, Emperor Yōzei formally acceded to the throne (sokui).
- 878 (Gangyō 2): Seiwa became a Buddhist priest. His new priestly name was Soshin (素真).
- 7 January 881 (Gangyō 4, 4th day of the 12th month): Former-Emperor Seiwa died at age 30.

== Kugyō ==
Kugyō (公卿) is a collective term for the very few most powerful men attached to the court of the Emperor of Japan in pre-Meiji eras.

In general, this elite group included only three to four men at a time. These were hereditary courtiers whose experience and background would have brought them to the pinnacle of a life's career. During Seiwa's reign, this apex of the Daijō-kan included:

- Sesshō, Fujiwara no Yoshifusa, 804–872.
- Daijō-daijin, Fujiwara no Yoshifusa.
- Sadaijin, Minamoto no Makoto (源信).
- Sadaijin, Minamoto no Tooru (源融).
- Udaijin, Fujiwara no Yoshimi (藤原良相), 817–867.
- Udaijin, Fujiwara no Ujimune (藤原氏宗).
- Udaijin, Fujiwara no Mototsune, 836–891.
- Naidaijin
- Dainagon, Fujiwara no Mototsune.

== Eras of Seiwa's reign ==
The years of Seiwa's reign are more specifically identified by more than one era name or nengō.

- Ten'an (857–859)
- Jōgan (859–877)

== Consorts and children ==
- Consort (Nyōgo) later Kōtaigō: Fujiwara no Takaiko (藤原高子; 842–910) later Nijo-kisaki (二条后), Fujiwara no Nagara's daughter
  - First Son: Imperial Prince Sadaakira (貞明親王) later Emperor Yōzei
  - Fourth Son: Imperial Prince Sadayasu (貞保親王; 870–924)
  - Third/Fifth daughter: Imperial Princess Atsuko (敦子内親王; d. 930), 7th Saiin in Kamo Shrine 877–880
- Consort (Nyōgo): Fujiwara no Tamiko (藤原多美子; d. 886), Fujiwara no Yoshimi's daughter
- Consort (Nyōgo): Taira no Kanshi (平寛子)
- Consort (Nyōgo): Princess Kashi (嘉子女王)
- Consort (Nyōgo): Minamoto no Sadako (源貞子; d. 873)
- Consort (Nyōgo): Princess Ryūshi (隆子女王)
- Consort (Nyōgo): Princess Kenshi (兼子女王)
- Consort (Nyōgo): Princess Chūshi/Tadako (忠子女王; 854–904), Emperor Kōkō's daughter
- Consort (Nyōgo): Fujiwara no Yoriko (藤原頼子; d. 936), Fujiwara no Mototsune's daughter
- Consort (Nyōgo): Fujiwara no Kazuko (藤原佳珠子; b. 856), Fujiwara no Mototsune's daughter
  - Seventh Son: Imperial Prince Sadatoki (貞辰親王; 874–929)
- Consort (Nyōgo): Minamoto no Takeko/Izuko (源厳子; d. 879), Minamoto no Yoshiari's daughter
- Consort (Nyōgo): Minamoto no Seishi (源済子), Emperor Montoku's daughter
- Consort (Nyōgo): Minamoto no Kenshi/Atsuko (源喧子)
- Consort (Nyōgo): Minamoto no Gishi/Yoshiko (源宜子), Minamoto no Okimoto's daughter
- Court Attendant (Koui): Ariwara no Fumiko (在原文子), Ariwara no Yukihira's daughter
  - Eighth Son: Imperial Prince Sadakazu (貞数親王; 875–916)
  - Imperial Princess Kaneko (包子内親王; d. 889)
- Court Attendant (Koui): Fujiwara no Yoshichika's daughter
  - Imperial Prince Sadahira (貞平親王; d. 914)
  - Imperial Princess Shikiko (識子内親王; 874–906), 21st Saiō (Imperial Princess serving at Ise Grand Shrine) 877–880
- Court Attendant (Koui): Tachibana no Yasukage's daughter (d. 924)
  - Imperial Prince Sadakata (貞固親王; 868–930)
- Court Attendant (Koui): Fujiwara no Nakamune's daughter
  - third Son: Imperial Prince Sadamoto (貞元親王; 870–910)
- Court Attendant (Koui): Prince Munesada's daughter
  - Sixth Son: Imperial Prince Sadasumi (貞純親王; 873–916) – father of Minamoto no Tsunemoto, founder of the Seiwa Genji, from whom the Kamakura shogunate, Ashikaga shogunate and the Tokugawa shogunate descend.
- Court Attendant (Koui): Fujiwara no Sadamune's daughter
  - Imperial Prince Sadayori (貞頼親王; 876–922)
- Court Attendant (Koui): Fujiwara no Morofuji's daughter
  - Imperial Prince Sadazane (貞真親王; 876–932)
- Court Attendant (Koui): Fujiwara no Morokazu's daughter
  - Imperial Princess Mōshi (孟子内親王; d. 901)
- Court Attendant (Koui): Saeki no Sanefusa's daughter
  - Minamoto no Nagami (源長鑒)
  - Minamoto no Nagayori (源長頼; b. 875)
- Court Attendant (Koui): Ben-no-miyasundokoro (弁の御息所), Ōe no Otondo's daughter
- Court lady: Kamo no Mineo's daughter
  - Minamoto no Naganori (源長猷; d. 918)
  - Minamoto no Saishi/Noriko (源載子)
- Court lady: Ōno no Takatori's daughter
  - Minamoto no Nagafuchi (源長淵)

== Ancestry ==
Ancestors of Emperor Seiwa

8. Emperor Saga (786–842)
4. Emperor Ninmyō (808–850)
9. Tachibana no Kachiko (786–850)
2. Emperor Montoku (826–858)
10. Fujiwara no Fuyutsugu (775–826)
5. Fujiwara no Junshi (809–871)
11. Fujiwara no Mitsuko (781–828)
1. Emperor Seiwa
12. Fujiwara no Fuyutsugu (775–826)
6. Fujiwara no Yoshifusa (804–872)
13. Fujiwara no Mitsuko (781–828)
3. Fujiwara no Akirakeiko (829–900)
14. Emperor Saga (786–842)
7. Minamoto no Kiyohime (810–856)
15. Taima

== Notes ==
Japanese Imperial kamon — a stylized chrysanthemum blossom

== See also ==
- Emperor of Japan
- List of Emperors of Japan
- Nihon Sandai Jitsuroku Corresponding to three reign of Emperor Seiwa, Yōzei, and Kōkō.
- Gion Matsuri Said to have originated during the reign of Emperor Seiwa (r. 858–876).
- Imperial cult
- Emperor Go-Mizunoo

Regnal titles
Preceded by Emperor Montoku	Emperor of Japan: Seiwa; 858–876	Succeeded by Emperor Yōzei
