= Fujiwara no Takaiko =

Japanese empress (842–910)

- 藤原高子
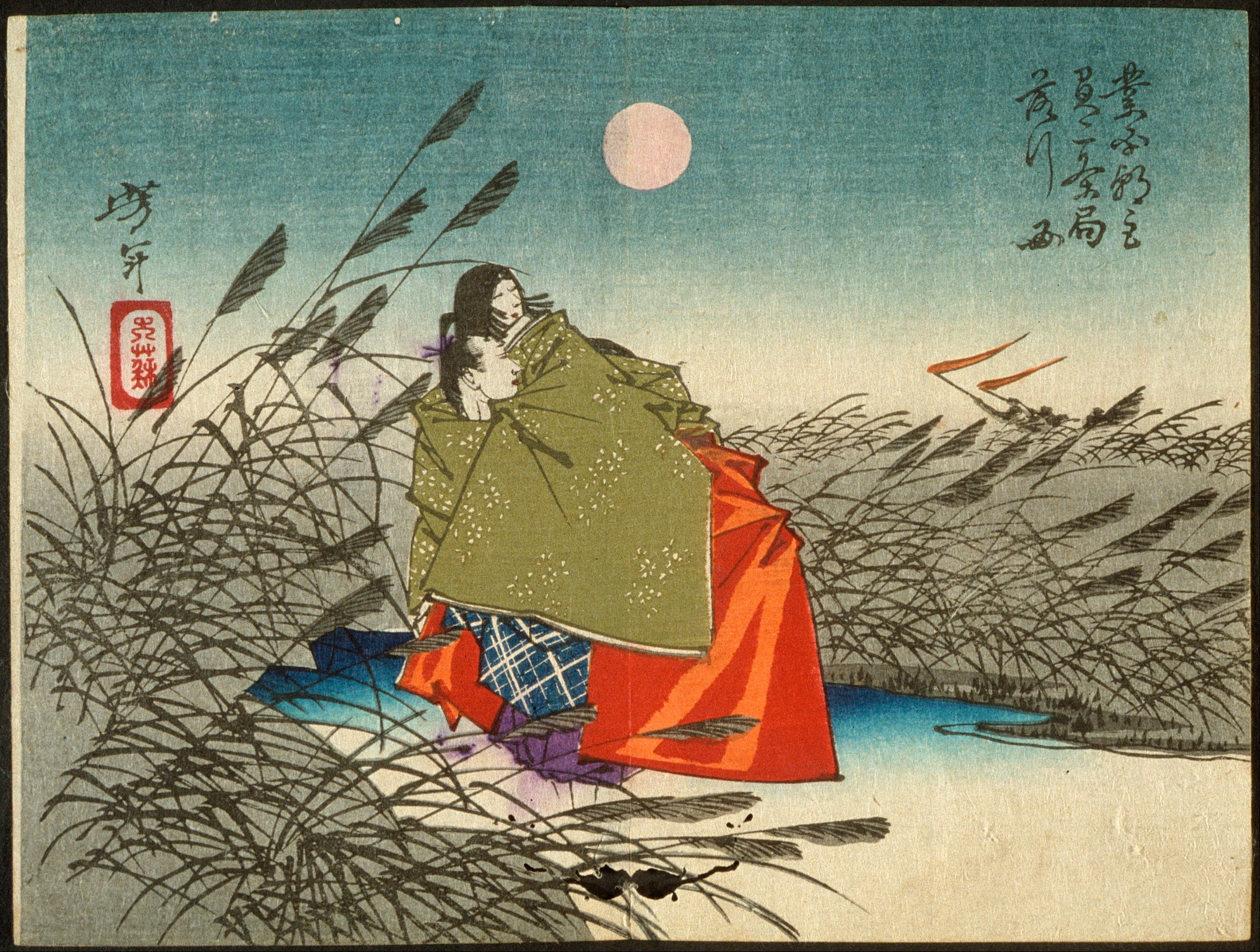
- Born: 842
- Died: 6 May 910
- Other names: Empress Nijō (二条后, Nijō-no-kisaki)
- Occupations: Empress consort; Empress dowager
- Era: Heian period
- Spouse: Emperor Seiwa
- Children: Emperor Yōzei
- Father: Fujiwara no Nagayoshi
- Relatives: Fujiwara no Mototsune (brother)

Fujiwara no Takaiko (藤原高子; 842 – May 6, 910), commonly known as Empress Nijō (二条后), was the mother of Emperor Yōzei, the 57th emperor of Japan, who lived during the Heian period. The daughter of Fujiwara no Nagayoshi and sister of Fujiwara no Mototsune, she was the consort of Emperor Seiwa who later became the empress dowager.

One of her poems is included in the Kokin Wakashū. Her other children were Prince Sadayasu (貞保親王; 870–924) and Princess Atsushi (敦子内親王; d. 930).

== Early life and family ==
Fujiwara was born in 842 to Fujiwara no Nagayoshi and Fujiwara no Otoharu, the latter a posthumous title holder of the rank of shoichii. She was the full sister of Fujiwara no Mototsune. The daughter of a nobleman who was chosen as a gosechimaihime was a prerequisite for future entry into the Imperial Court in Kyoto as a candidate for empress, but by this time her biological father, Nagara, had already died of illness, leaving her without a guardian, so it is possible that Takaiko was also adopted by Fujiwara no Yoshifusa (Nagara's younger brother and Emperor Seiwa's maternal grandfather), who had also adopted her older brother, Mototsune. However, because the Emperor was still a child, Takaiko did not actually enter the Imperial Court until seven years after Gosechimai, later than Fujiwara no Tamiko, the daughter of Nagara's other brother, Fujiwara no Yoshiaki.

== Overview ==
When Emperor Seiwa was the crown prince, Takaiko served at the residence of the Emperor's grandmother, Empress Dowager Fujiwara no Junshi. In 859, at the age of 9, at the Daijosai ceremony following the accession of Emperor Seiwa, she performed as a dancer in the goseki dance and was promoted to Junior Fifth Rank. In 866, at the age of 25 and two years after Emperor Seiwa's coming-of-age ceremony, Takaiko entered the Imperial Court and became a consort. Her title was jonei-den.

On January 2, 869, Takaiko gave birth to Imperial Prince Sadaakira (貞明親王) who was to later become Emperor Yōzei. On January 8, 876, she was awarded the rank of Junior Fourth Rank, Lower Grade, and on January 8, 877, the rank of Junior Third Rank. With the accession of her son to the throne in 876, Takaiko became Crown Princess and was granted the position of Empress Dowager in 877. Takaiko was awarded the rank of Junior First Rank in 881, and given the honorific title of Empress Dowager the following year.

Takaiko did not, however, get along with her brother, the powerful regent Fujiwara no Mototsune, nor with Fujiwara no Yoshiko, her half-sister and foster mother of Minamoto no Sadamichi (later Emperor Uda). Some believe that Takaiko's actions of neglecting Mototsune, and favoring Ariwara no Fumiko (Seiwa's concubine), led Mototsune to abandon his familial ties and reject Takaiko and Emperor Yōzei. However, it was Emperor Seiwa himself who appointed Ariwara no Fumiko as his concubine and fathered several princes and daughters with her. Despite Takaiko's producing Prince Sadaaki (Emperor Yōzei), Prince Sadayasu, and Princess Atsuko with Emperor Seiwa, Seiwa also allowed numerous women to enter the court regardless of clan or surname, resulting in numerous other princes. Mototsune's decision to allow his daughter Yoriko, who was of comparative low maternal descent, then his daughter Kasuko, also of low descent, to enter the court, in the hopes of giving birth to a grandson, may have provoked Takaiko's resentment. Fumiei Tsunoda posits the theory that Fujiwara Yoshiko was secretly working behind the scenes.

In 884, Emperor Yōzei abdicated his title. The official reason given was illness, but the Emperor's defeat in imperial virtue was due to his beating his wet-son, Minamoto no Masu, to death.

Due to these circumstances, Prince Sadayasu, Yōzei's younger brother and Takaiko's second son, was not chosen as the next emperor, and Prince Tokiyasu (Emperor Kōkō) was instead. Furthermore, when Emperor Kōkō's illness worsened, Minamoto no Sadamichi (Emperor Uda) was selected as the next emperor, over Prince Sadayasu. This was unprecedented for a prince who had once left the imperial family and been demoted to commoner status to ascend to the throne.

In 896, during Emperor Uda's reign, Taikako was suspected of having an affair with Zensuke, the head priest of Toko-ji Temple, which she had built during the Gangyo era, and was deposed from her position as Empress Dowager; the following year, the Emperor's birth mother, Princess Banshi, was promoted from Crown Princess to Empress Dowager. After Princess Banshi's death, in 943, Taikako was restored to the throne (under vague terms) by imperial edict of Emperor Suzaku.

=== Other speculation ===
Based on historical sources such as the Tales of Ise and the Tales of Yamato, it is speculated that Takaiko had a romantic relationship with Ariwara no Narihira before entering the Imperial Court. It has also been suggested that the delay in Takaiko's entry into the Court was not simply due to Emperor Seiwa's age, but also because Yoshifusa, her guardian, was hesitant to allow her to enter after learning of her relationship with Narihira.

== Works ==
One of Taikako's poems is included in the Kokin Wakashū (poem number 4).

== Western books cited ==
- Brown, Delmer M. and Ishida, Ichirō, eds. (1979). Gukanshō: The Future and the Past. Berkeley: University of California Press. ISBN 978-0-520-03460-0; OCLC 251325323
- Ponsonby-Fane, Richard Arthur Brabazon. (1959). The Imperial House of Japan. Kyoto: Ponsonby Memorial Society. OCLC 194887
- Titsingh, Isaac. (1834). Nihon Ōdai Ichiran; ou, Annales des empereurs du Japon. Paris: Royal Asiatic Society, Oriental Translation Fund of Great Britain and Ireland. OCLC 5850691
- Varley, H. Paul. (1980). Jinnō Shōtōki: A Chronicle of Gods and Sovereigns. New York: Columbia University Press. ISBN 978-0-231-04940-5; OCLC 59145842
