= Fujiwara no Tokihira =

Japanese statesman, courtier and politician

Senior First Rank Fujiwara no Tokihira 藤原時平
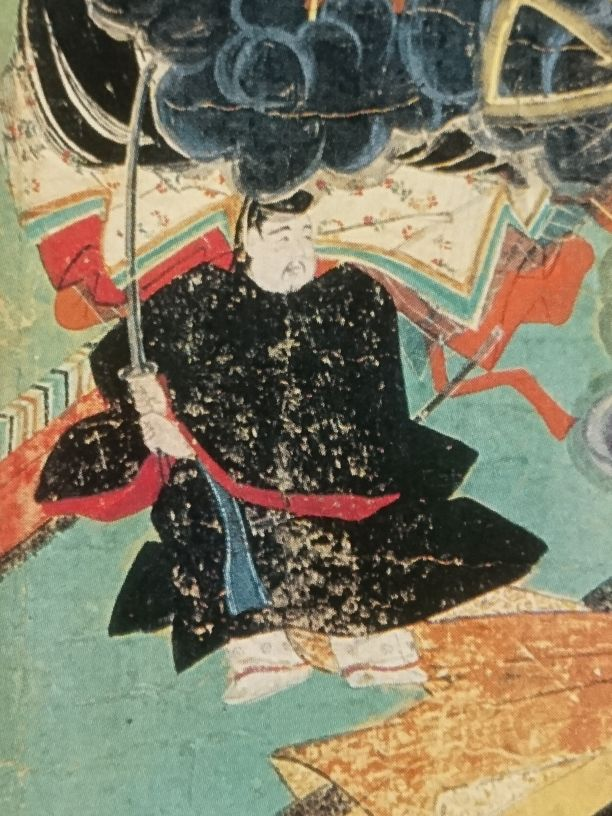
- Born: 871
- Died: April 26, 909 (aged 37–38)
- Parents: Fujiwara no Mototsune (father)

Fujiwara no Tokihira (藤原 時平; 871 – April 26, 909) was a Japanese statesman, courtier, regent and politician of the powerful Fujiwara clan during the Heian period.

== Career ==
Tokihira was a minister under Emperor Daigo.

- 891 (Kanpyō 3, 3rd month): Tokihira was given a rank which was the equivalent of sangi.
- 897 (Kanpyō 9, 6th month): Tokihira was made Dainagon with a rank equal to that of a General of the Left.
- 899 (Shōtai 2): Tokihira was named Sadaijin
- 900 (Shōtai 3): Tokihira accused Sugawara no Michizane of plotting against the emperor. This led to Michizane's exile to the Dazaifu in Kyūshū.
- 909 (Engi 9, 4th month): Tokihira died at age 39. He was honored with posthumous rank and titles.

== Genealogy ==
This member of the Fujiwara clan was the son of Fujiwara no Mototsune. Tokihira had two brothers: Fujiwara no Tadahira and Fujiwara no Nakahira.

- Father: Fujiwara no Mototsune
- Mother: Daughter of Imperial Prince Saneyasu
- Wife: Princess Renshi (廉子女王), daughter of Imperial Prince Motoyasu
  - 1st Son: Fujiwara no Yasutada (藤原保忠; 890-936)
  - Daughter: Fujiwara no Hōshi (藤原 褒子), consort of Emperor Uda
  - Daughter: Fujiwara no Hitoshi (藤原 仁善子)
- Wife: Daughter of Minamoto Jin
  - 2nd Son: Fujiwara no Akitadata (藤原顕忠; 898-965)
- Wife: Daughter of Ariwara no Muneyana
  - 3rd Son: Fujiwara no Atsutada (藤原敦忠; 906-943)
- Wife: Unknown
  - Daughter: Concubine of Fujiwara no Saneyori
  - Daughter: Wife of Imperial Prince Atsumi
  - Daughter: Wife of Imperial Prince Yoshiakira

== Selected works ==
In a statistical overview derived from writings by and about Fujiwara no Tokihira, OCLC/WorldCat encompasses roughly 35 works in 69 publications in 1 language and 122 library holdings.

- Sandai jitsuroku (三代實).
- Engi shiki (延喜式).

== See also ==
- Six National Histories
- Sugawara no Michizane
- Tenjin (kami)
- Sugawara Denju Tenarai Kagami
