= Fujiwara no Nagara =

9th-century Japanese statesman

Fujiwara no Nagara 藤原長良
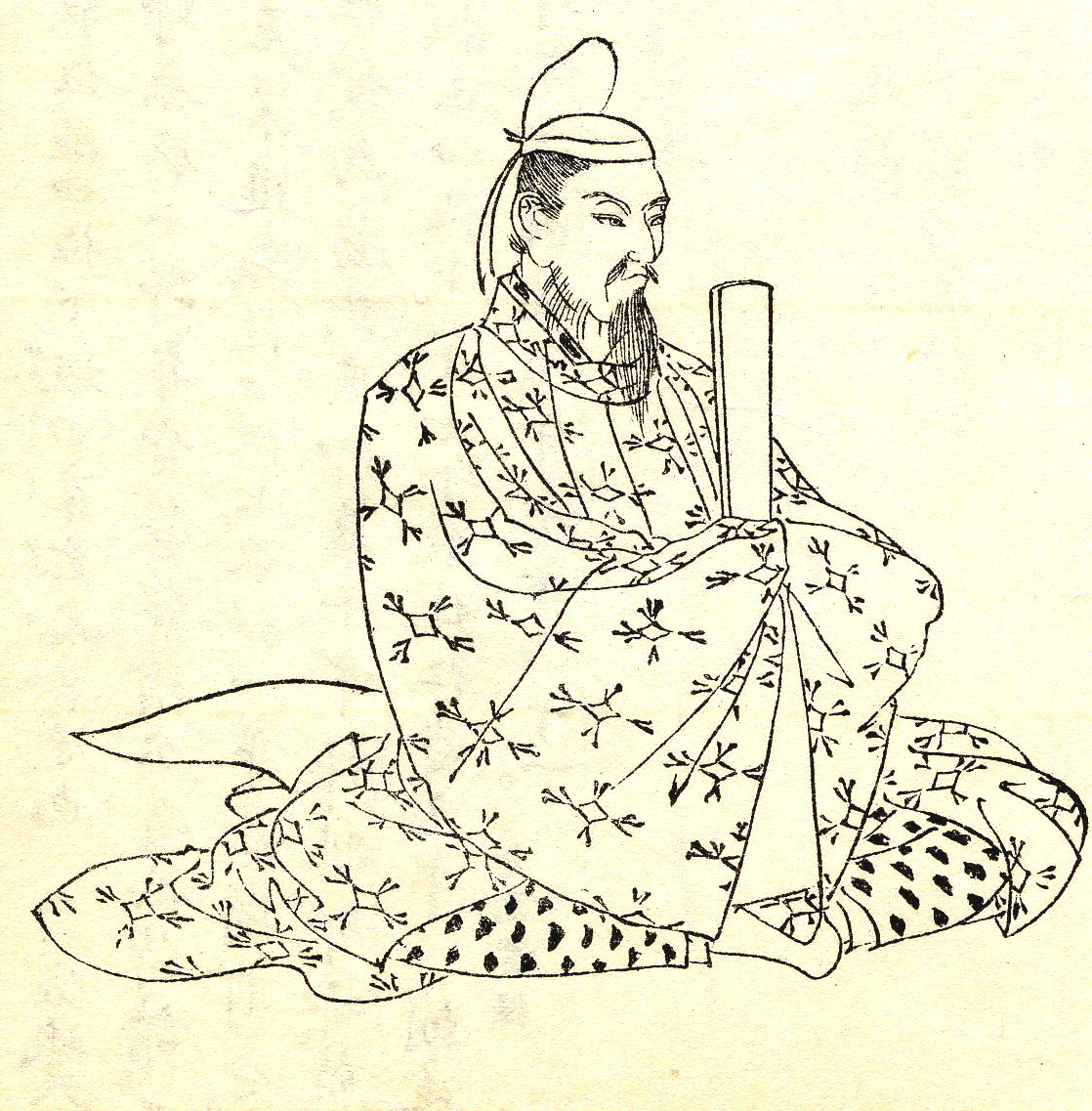
- Illustration by Kikuchi Yōsai, from Zenken Kojitsu
- Born: 802
- Died: 6 August 856 (aged 53–54)
- Family: Fujiwara Hokke
- Issue Detail: Fujiwara no Takaiko
- Father: Fujiwara no Fuyutsugu

This is about the 9th-century Japanese statesman. For the 10th-century Japanese poet also known as Nagayoshi, see Fujiwara no Nagatō.

Fujiwara no Nagara (藤原長良; 802 – 6 August 856), also known as Fujiwara no Nagayoshi, was a Japanese statesman, courtier and politician of the early Heian period. He was the grandfather of Emperor Yōzei.

== Life ==
Nagara was born as the eldest son of the sadaijin Fujiwara no Fuyutsugu, a powerful figure in the court of Emperor Saga. He was also a descendant of the early Japanese emperors and was well trusted by Emperor Ninmyō since his time as crown prince, and attended on him frequently. However, after Ninmyō took the throne, Nagara's advancement was overtaken by his younger brother Fujiwara no Yoshifusa. He served as director of the kurōdo-dokoro (蔵人所) and division chief (督) in the imperial guard before finally making sangi and joining the kugyō in 844, ten years after his younger brother.

In 850, Nagara's nephew Emperor Montoku took the throne, and Nagara was promoted to shō shi-i no ge (正四位下) and then ju san-mi (従三位), and in 851 to shō san-mi (正三位). In the same year, though, Nagara was overtaken once more as his brother Fujiwara no Yoshimi, more than ten years his junior, was promoted to chūnagon. In 854, when Yoshimi was promoted to dainagon, Nagara was promoted to fill his old position of chūnagon. In 856 he was promoted to 従二位 (ju ni-i), but died shortly thereafter at the age of 55.

== Legacy ==
After Nagara's death, his daughter Takaiko became a court lady of Emperor Seiwa. In 877, after her son Prince Sadaakira took the throne as Emperor Yōzei, Nagara was posthumously promoted to shō ichi-i (正一位) and sadaijin, and again in 879 to daijō-daijin.

Nagara was overtaken in life by his brother Yoshifusa and Yoshimi, but he had more children, and his descendants thrived. His third son Fujiwara no Mototsune was adopted by Yoshifusa, and his line branched into various powerful clans, including the five regent houses.

Before the Middle Ages, there may have been a tendency to view Mototsune's biological father Nagara rather than his adoptive father Yoshifusa as his parent, making Nagara out as the ancestor of the regent family. This may have impacted the Ōkagami, leading it to depict Nagara as the head of the Hokke instead of Yoshifusa.

== Personality ==
Nagara had a noble disposition, both tender-hearted and magnanimous. Despite being overtaken by his brothers, he continued to love them deeply. He was treated his subordinates with tolerance, and was loved by people of all ranks. When Emperor Ninmyō died, Fuyutsugu is said to have mourned him like a parent, even abstaining from food as he prayed for the happiness of the Emperor's spirit.

When he served Emperor Montoku in his youth, the Emperor treated him as an equal, but Nagara did not abandon formal dress or display an overly familiar attitude.

== Genealogy ==
- Father: Fujiwara no Fuyutsugu
- Mother: Fujiwara no Mitsuko (藤原美都子), daughter of Fujiwara no Matsukuri (藤原真作)
- Wife: Nanba no Fuchiko (難波渕子)
  - Eldest son: Fujiwara no Kunitsune (藤原国経; 828–908)
  - Second son: Fujiwara no Tōtsune (藤原遠経; 835–888)
- Wife: Fujiwara no Otoharu (藤原乙春), daughter of Fujiwara no Fusatsugu (藤原総継)
  - Third son: Fujiwara no Mototsune (藤原基経; 836–891), adopted by Fujiwara no Yoshifusa
  - Fourth son: Fujiwara no Takatsune (藤原高経; ?–893)
  - Fifth son: Fujiwara no Hirotsune (藤原弘経; 838–883)
  - Sixth son: Fujiwara no Kiyotsune (藤原清経; 846–915)
  - Daughter: Fujiwara no Takaiko (藤原高子; 842–910), court lady of Emperor Seiwa, mother of Emperor Yōzei
- Unknown wife (possibly Nanba no Fuchiko (難波渕子))
  - Daughter: Fujiwara no Shukushi (藤原淑子; 838–906), wife of Fujiwara no Ujimune, adoptive mother of Emperor Uda, Naishi-no-kami (尚侍)
  - Daughter: Fujiwara no Ariko (藤原有子; ?–866), wife of Taira no Takamune, Naishi-no-suke (典侍)
