= Prince Motoyoshi =

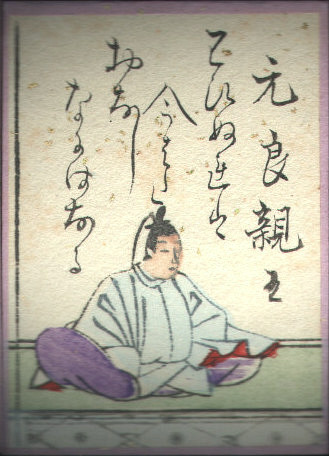
Prince Motoyoshi

Prince Motoyoshi (元良親王, Motoyoshi shinnō, 890-July 26, 943) was a poet and nobleman of the Heian period. One of his poems is included in the Ogura Hyakunin Isshu as number 20 in the anthology. Twenty of his poems were included in the Gosen Wakashū; a personal anthology entitled Motoyoshi Shinnō-shū (元良親王集) is also extant.

He was the eldest son of Emperor Yōzei. His wives included Shūshi, a daughter of Emperor Daigo, and Kaishi, a daughter of Emperor Uda.

== Family ==
Parents

- Father: Emperor Yōzei (陽成天皇, 2 January 869 – 23 October 949)
- Mother: Daughter of Fujiwara no Tonaga (藤原遠長)

Consorts and issue(s):

- Wife: Daughter of Fujiwara no Tonaga (藤原遠長)
  - Son: Prince Saji (佐時王)
- Wife: Imperial Princess Shūshi (修子内親王; d.933), eighth daughter of Emperor Daigo
  - Son: Prince Sayori (佐頼王)
- Wife: Imperial Princess Kaishi (誨子内親王; 894–952), daughter of Emperor Uda
  - Son: Minamoto Saigei (源佐芸)
- Unknown Concubine
  - Son: Prince Sazai (佐材王)
  - Son: Prince Seken (佐兼王)
  - Son: Minamoto Sahei (源佐平)
  - Son: Minamoto Sachika (源佐親)
