= Emperor Kōkō =

Emperor of Japan from 884 to 887

Emperor Kōkō 光孝天皇
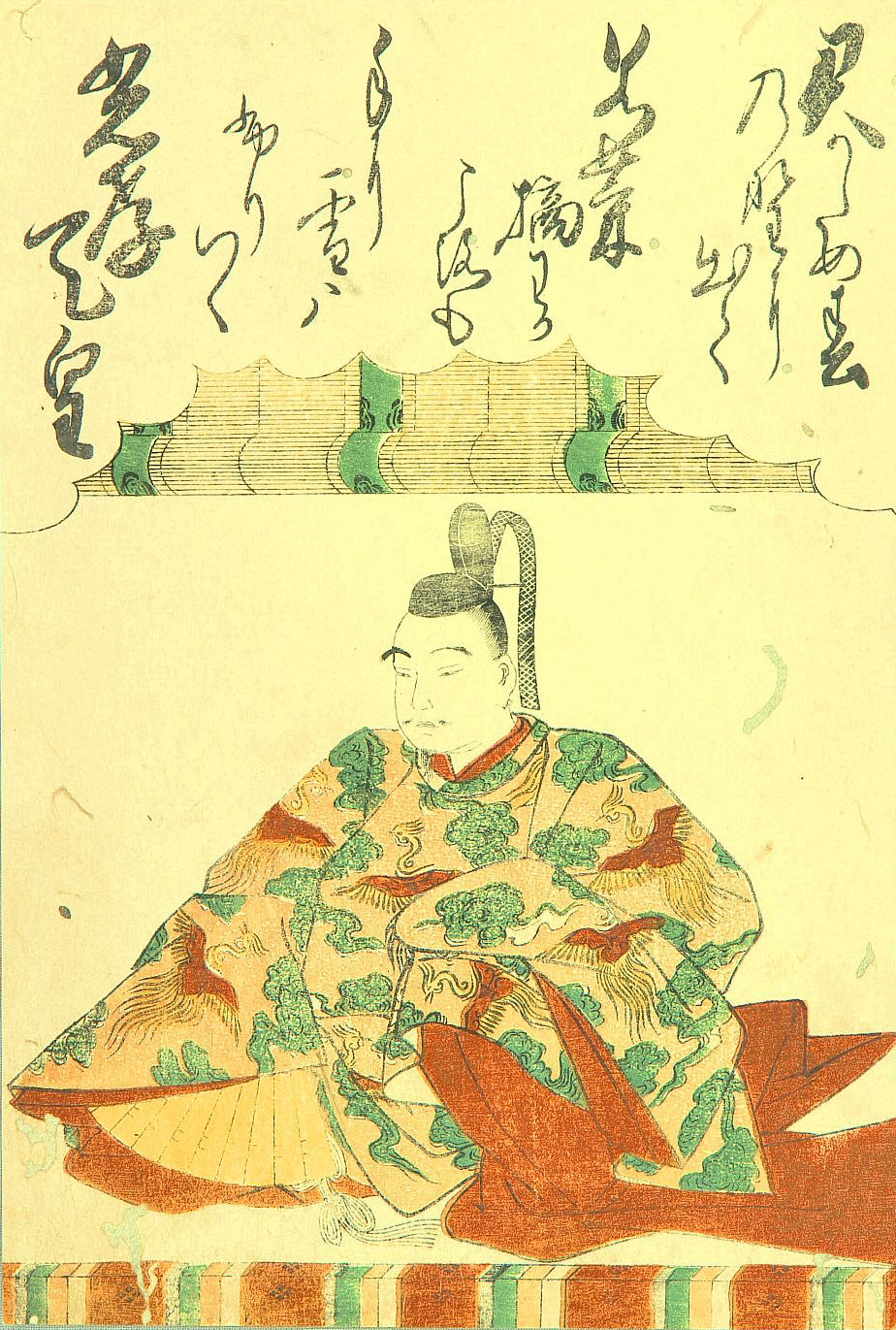
- Portrait by Katsukawa Shunshō, 1775

Emperor of Japan
- Reign: March 5, 884 – September 17, 887
- Enthronement: March 23, 884
- Predecessor: Yōzei
- Successor: Uda
- Born: 830; Heian-kyō (Kyōto)
- Died: 17 September 887 (aged 57); Jijūden (仁寿殿) of Inner Palace
- Burial: Nochi no Tamura no misasagi (後田邑陵) (Kyoto)
- Issue more...: Emperor Uda
Posthumous name
- Chinese-style shigō: Emperor Kōkō (光孝天皇)
- House: Imperial House of Japan
- Father: Emperor Ninmyō
- Mother: Fujiwara no Takushi

Emperor Kōkō (光孝天皇, Kōkō-tennō; 830 – September 17, 887) was the 58th emperor of Japan, according to the traditional order of succession. Kōkō reigned from 884 to 887.

Before the emperor's ascension to the Chrysanthemum Throne, his name (imina) was Tokiyasu Shinnō (時康親王) or Komatsu-tei. He would later be identified sometimes as "the Emperor of Komatsu". This resulted in the later Emperor Go-Komatsu adopting this name (go- meaning "later", so "Later Emperor Komatsu" or "Emperor Komatsu II"). Kōkō had four Imperial consorts and 41 Imperial sons and daughters.

== Biography ==
Prince Tokiyasu was the third son of Emperor Ninmyō. His mother was Fujiwara no Sawako.From a young age, he was favored by Empress Dowager Tachibana no Kachiko. In 843, he came of age in the presence of his father, Emperor Ninmyō, becoming a prince and was granted the fourth rank. Thereafter, he held almost all of the official positions customarily held by princes, including Minister of the Central Affairs, Minister of Ceremonial Affairs, Chief of the Sumo Bureau, Governor of Dazaifu, Governor of Hitachi Province, and Governor of Kōzuke Province. (These were distant appointments, and he did not actually reside in those provinces). In 882, he was granted the first rank, becoming the foremost prince.

Following Emperor Yōzei's forced abdication he ascended the throne in 884 at the age of 55 as Emperor Kōkō. Prior to this, Fujiwara no Mototsune, the regent and maternal cousin, strongly advocated for Prince Tokiyasu, and Fujiwara no Morokazu, drew his sword and intimidated the assembly, thus suppressing any dissenting opinion. After his enthronement, Emperor Kōkō appointed Mototsune as regent and entrusted him with the affairs of state, as had been the case with the previous reign. The Tsurezuregusa recounts that even after his enthronement, Tsurezuregusa left the room where he had once cooked, stained with black soot, as a reminder of his difficult times as a prince. A similar anecdote is found in the Kojidan. However, given his position as a prince of high status, he should not have been in such dire straits.

Emperor Kōkō, anticipating that Mototsune would have his nephew, Prince Sadayasu (Emperor Yōzei's younger brother), succeed to the throne, publicly declared his intention not to pass the throne to his descendants by demoting all of his children to commoner status upon his enthronement. However, Mototsune was in conflict with his sister, Dowager Empress Takako, and was obstructing the enthronement of her son, Prince Sadayasu, as Crown Prince, thus preventing a clear successor. Eventually, Emperor Kōkō fell ill, and to resolve the issue, restored his son, Minamoto no Sadami, to the imperial family and appointed him Crown Prince. On the same day, the Emperor Kōkō died at the age of 58, and Prince Sadami ascended to the throne as Emperor Uda.

Just 26 days before his death, the Ninna earthquake (according to the Nihon Sandai Jitsuroku), devastated the Kinai region. Also, in the same year, wind and flood disasters occurred throughout the country.

Emperor Kōkō is said to have been a cultured man skilled in various arts, and he worked to revive ancient court ceremonies. He excelled in waka poetry and the koto (Japanese zither), and he revived falconry, following the precedent set by Emperor Kanmu. Furthermore, perhaps due to his experience as the head of the Sumo Bureau during his time as a prince, he encouraged sumo wrestling after his enthronement. In his later years, he planned to establish an imperial temple near Uda-in, which is believed to have been his residence during his time as a prince. However, neither of these plans came to fruition, and these aspirations were carried on by his successor, Emperor Uda, who sponsored the founding of Ninna-ji.

== Grave of Emperor Kōkō ==
Per the Nihon Kiryaku, the grave of the emperor was the Komatsuyama-ryo (小松山陵) and eight temples within the mausoleum grounds are demolished to construct the mausoleum. In 1106, during the reconstruction of the monks' quarters at Ninna-ji's North Precinct, the western earthen wall encroached upon the mausoleum grounds (according to the Chūyūki). Afterward, the location of the mausoleum became unknown.

During the Edo period, Bunkyu Restoration of the imperial graves (1862-1863), the site of the tomb was not found and therefore not repaired. June 1889, the current location of Tennōzuka (Ukyō-ku, Kyoto) was designated as the mausoleum of Emperor Kōkō by the Imperial Household Agency as the Kaguragaoka no Higashi no misasagi.

== Events of Kōkō's life ==
The first kampaku Fujiwara no Mototsune was influential in the process by which Kōkō became an emperor. At the time Emperor Yōzei was deposed, Prince Tokiyasu was already Governor of Hitachi and Chief Minister of Ceremonies (Jibu-kyō, 治部卿).

According to Kitabatake Chikafusa's 14th-century account, Mototsune resolved the problem of succession by simply going to visit Tokiyasu-shinnō, where the kampaku addressed the prince as a sovereign and assigned imperial guards. The prince signaled his acceptance by going into the imperial palanquin, which then conducted him to the emperor's residence within the palace. Curiously, he was still wearing the robes of a prince when he decided to take this ride into an entirely unanticipated future.

- February 4, 884 (Gangyō 8, 4th day of the 1st month): In the 8th year of Emperor Yōzei's reign (陽成天皇八年), the emperor was deposed; and scholars then construed that the succession (senso) was received by the third son of former Emperor Ninmyō, who was then age 55.
- March 23, 884 (Gangyō 8, 23rd day of the 2nd month): Emperor Kōkō is said to have acceded to the throne (sokui).
- 885 (Gangyō 9): The era name was changed accordingly in 885.

During his reign, Kōkō revived many ancient court rituals and ceremonies, and one example is the imperial hawking excursion to Serikawa, which had been initiated in 796 by Emperor Kanmu. This ritual event was revived by Kōkō after a lapse of 50 years.

- January 11, 886 (Ninna 2, 14th day of the 12th month): Kōkō traveled to Seri-gawa to hunt with falcons. He very much enjoyed this kind of hunting, and he often took time for this kind of activity.
- September 17, 887 (Ninna 3, 26th day of the 8th month ) 仁和三年八月二十六日 -->: Kōkō died at the age of 57.

=== Kugyō ===
Kugyō (公卿) is a collective term for the very few most powerful men attached to the court of the Emperor of Japan in pre-Meiji eras.

In general, this elite group included only three to four men at a time. These were hereditary courtiers whose experience and background would have brought them to the pinnacle of a life's career. During Kōkō's reign, this apex of the Daijō-kan included:

- Kampaku, Fujiwara no Mototsune (藤原基経) (Shōsen-kō, 昭宣公), 836–891.
- Daijō-daijin, Fujiwara no Mototsune.
- Sadaijin, Minamoto no Tōru (源融).
- Udaijin, Minamoto no Masaru (源多).
- Naidaijin (not appointed)
- Dainagon, Fujiwara no Yoshiyo (藤原良世)
- Dainagon, Fujiwara no Fuyuo (藤原冬緒)

== Eras of Kōkō's reign ==
The years of Kōkō's reign are more specifically identified by more than one era name or nengō.

- Gangyō (877–885)
- Ninna (885–889)

== Consorts and children ==
- Consort (later Kōtaigō): Princess Hanshi (班子女王; 833–900) later Toin-Kisaki (洞院后), Imperial Prince Nakano's daughter (son of Emperor Kanmu)
  - First Son: Minamoto no Motonaga (源元長; d. 883), died before Emperor Kōkō's accession
  - Twelfth son: Imperial Prince Koretada (是忠親王; 857–922)
  - Thirteenth Son: Imperial Prince Koresada (是貞親王; d. 903)
  - Fifteenth Son: Imperial Prince Sadami (定省親王) later Emperor Uda
  - Fourth Daughter: Imperial Princess Tadako (忠子内親王; 854–904), married to Emperor Seiwa
  - Fifth Daughter: Imperial Princess Kanshi (簡子内親王; d. 914)
  - Eighth Daughter: Imperial Princess Yasuko (綏子内親王; d. 925), married to Emperor Yōzei
  - Sixteenth Daughter: Imperial Princess Ishi (為子内親王; d. 899), married to Emperor Daigo
- Consort (Nyōgo): Fujiwara no Kamiko (藤原佳美子; d. 898), Fujiwara no Mototsune's daughter
- Consort (Nyōgo): Fujiwara no Genjiko (藤原元善子), Fujiwara no Yamakage's daughter
- Consort (Nyōgo): Taira no Motoko/Tōshi (平等子), Taira no Yoshikaze's daughter
- Court Attendant (Koui): Shigeno no Naoko (滋野直子; d. 915)
  - Fourth Daughter: Imperial Princess Shigeko (繁子内親王; d. 916), 23rd Saiō in Ise Shrine 884–887
- Court Attendant (Koui): Sanuki no Naganao's daughter
  - Ninth Son: Minamoto no Motomi (源旧鑒; d. 908)
- Court Attendant (Koui): Fujiwara Motoko (藤原元子)
- Court lady: Sugawara no Ruishi (菅原類子), Sugawara no Koreyoshi's daughter
- Court lady: Princess Keishin (桂心女王), Prince Masami's daughter
  - Seventh Daughter: Imperial Princess Bokushi (穆子内親王; d. 903), 8th Saiin in Kamo Shrine 882–887
- Court lady: daughter of Tajihi clan (多治氏の娘)
  - Minamoto no Kanshi/Ayako (源緩子/綾子; d. 908)
- Court lady: A daughter of Fuse clan (布勢氏の娘)
  - Twelfth Son: Shigemizu no Kiyozane (滋水清実), given the family name "Shigemizu" by the Emperor (Shisei Kōka, 賜姓降下) in 886
- Court Attendant (Koui): Fujiwara no Kadomune's daughter, later married Minamoto no Noboru
  - Thirteenth Son (adopted son): Minamoto no Koreshige (源是茂; 886–941), Minamoto no Noboru's son
- (from unknown women)
  - Second Son: Minamoto no Kaneyoshi (源兼善; d. 879)
  - Third son: Minamoto no Nazane (源名実)
  - Fourth Son: Minamoto no Atsuyuki (源篤行)
  - Fifth Son: Minamoto no Seiyoshi (源最善)
  - Sixth Son: Minamoto no Chikayoshi (源近善; d. 918)
  - Seventh son: Minamoto no Ototsune (源音恒)
  - Eighth Son: Minamoto no Koretsune (源是恒; d. 905)
  - Tenth Son: Minamoto no Sadatsune (源貞恒; 857–908)
  - Eleventh Son: Minamoto no Narikage (源成蔭)
  - Fourteenth Son: Minamoto no Kuninori (源国紀; d. 909)
  - Sixteenth Son: Minamoto no Kosen (源香泉)
  - Seventeenth Son: Minamoto no Tomosada (源友貞)
  - First Daughter: Minamoto no Osoko (源遅子)
  - Second Daughter: Minamoto no Reishi (源麗子)
  - Third Daughter: Minamoto no Onshi/Kusuko (源音子/奇子; d. 919)
  - Sixth Daughter: Minamoto no Shushi (源崇子)
  - Seventh Daughter: Minamoto no Renshi/Tsurako (源連子; d. 905)
  - Ninth Daughter: Minamoto no Reishi (源礼子)
  - Tenth Daughter: Minamoto no Saishi (源最子; d. 886)
  - Eleventh Daughter: Minamoto no Kaishi (源偕子)
  - Twelve Daughter: Minamoto no Mokushi (源黙子; d. 902)
  - Thirteenth Daughter: Minamoto no Koreko (源是子)
  - Fourteenth Daughter: Minamoto no Heishi (源並子; d. 906)
  - Fifteenth Daughter: Minamoto no Shinshi (源深子; d. 917)
  - Seventeenth Daughter: Minamoto no Shūshi (源周子; d. 912)
  - Eighteenth Daughter: Minamoto no Mitsuko (源密子)
  - Minamoto no Washi (源和子; d. 947), married to Emperor Daigo
  - Minamoto no Kenshi (源謙子; d. 924)
  - Minamoto no Sayako (源袟子)
  - Minamoto no Kaishi (源快子; d. 910)
  - Minamoto no Zenshi (源善子)

== Poetry ==
Emperor Kōkō is well-remembered for his poetry, and one of his waka appeared in the Ogura Hyakunin Isshu:

君がため春の野に出でて若菜つむ
わが衣手に雪はふりつつ
kimi ga tame haru no no ni idete wakana tsumu
waga koromode ni yuki wa furitsutsu
(Kokin Wakashū 1:21)

== Ancestry ==
Ancestors of Emperor Kōkō

8. Emperor Kanmu (737–806)
4. Emperor Saga (786–842)
9. Fujiwara no Otomuro (760–790)
2. Emperor Ninmyō (808–850)
10. Tachibana no Kiyotomo (758–789)
5. Tachibana no Kachiko (786–850)
11. Taguchi Michihime
1. Emperor Kōkō
12. Fujiwara no Sueshige
6. Fujiwara no Fusatsugu
3. Fujiwara no Takushi (d. 839)
7. Fujiwara no Kazuko

== See also ==
- Emperor Go-Komatsu
- Emperor of Japan
  - List of Emperors of Japan
- Imperial cult

== Notes ==
Japanese Imperial kamon — a stylized chrysanthemum blossom

Regnal titles
| Preceded by Emperor Yōzei | Emperor of Japan: Kōkō; 884–887 | Succeeded by Emperor Uda |
