= Minamoto no Yoshiari =

Japanese court official during the Heian period

Minamoto no Yoshiari (源能有, 845 – 897) was a Japanese court official during the Heian period, and founder of the Takeda school of archery.

Yoshiari was a son of Emperor Montoku, although he was granted the surname Minamoto which removed him from the Imperial lineage. He was a successful courtier, being appointed as a court consultant at the age of 28 and rising to the post of middle counsellor by 883.

He held various positions at court including Grand Counsellor in 891, General of the Left in 893, mentor to Crown Prince Atsuhito and Inspector of Mutsu and Dewa. In 891, he was appointed Grand Counsellor. At the behest of Emperor Uda, he was assigned to the work of compiling a National History covering the period from the reign of Emperor Seiwa to that of Emperor Koko. This was an unusual appointment, in that custom dictated a member of the Fujiwara clan should have held the post of Chief compiler; it is thought that this was an attempt by Emperor Uda to undermine the increasingly influential Fujiwara.

Ordered by Emperor Uda to develop a style of mounted archery, Yoshiaki created what was to later become the Takeda school of yabusame.
