= Fujiwara no Mototsune =

Japanese statesman, courtier and aristocrat

Senior First Rank Fujiwara no Mototsune 藤原 基経
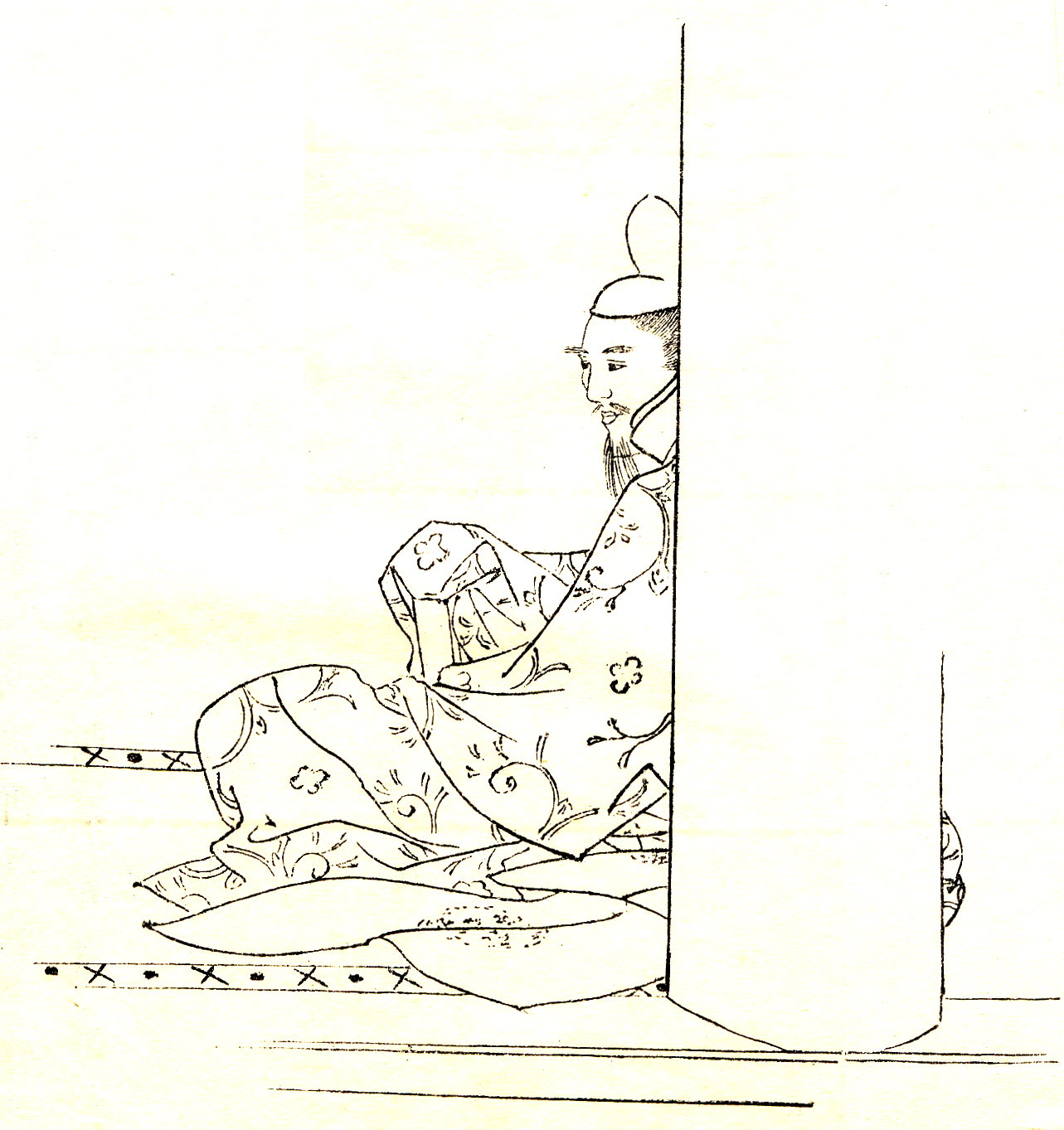
- Mototsune by Kikuchi Yōsai
- Born: 836
- Died: February 25, 891 (aged 54–55)
- Family: Fujiwara Hokke
- Father: Fujiwara no Yoshifusa

Fujiwara no Mototsune (藤原 基経; 836 – February 25, 891), also known as Horikawa Daijin (堀川大臣), was a Japanese statesman, courtier and aristocrat of the early Heian period. He was the first kampaku, a regent of an adult emperor, in Japanese history.

== Biography ==
He was born the third son of Fujiwara no Nagara, but was adopted by his powerful uncle Fujiwara no Yoshifusa, who had no sons. Mototsune followed in Yoshifusa's footsteps, holding power in the court in the position of regent for four successive emperors.

Mototsune invented the position of kampaku regent for himself in order to remain in power even after an emperor reached maturity. This innovation allowed the Fujiwara clan to tighten its grip on power right throughout an emperor's reign.

Mototsune is referred to as Shōsen Kō (昭宣公) (posthumous name as Daijō Daijin).

== Career ==
- 864 (Jōgan 6): Mototsune was named Sangi
- 866 (Jōgan 8): Chūnagon
- 870 (Jōgan 12, 1st month): He became Dainagon
- 872 (Jōgan 14): He was named Udaijin
- 876 (Jōgan 18): He was named Sesshō
- 880 (Gangyō 4): He was named Daijō Daijin
- 884 (Gangyō 8): Mototsune was the first to receive the title Kampaku.
- 890 (Kanpyō 2, 14th day of the 12th month): retire from Kampaku
- February 25, 891 (Kampyō 3, 13th day of the 1st month): Mototsune died at the age of 56.

== Genealogy ==
This member of the Fujiwara clan was the son of Fujiwara no Nagara, who was one of the brothers of Fujiwara no Yoshifusa. Mototsune was adopted as son and heir of Yoshifusa. In other words, Yoshifusa was Mototsune's uncle, and father through adoption.

He was married to a daughter of Imperial Prince Saneyasu (son of Emperor Ninmyō).

Their children were

- Tokihira (時平) (871–909) – Sadaijin
- Nakahira (仲平) (875–945) – Sadaijin
- Tadahira (忠平) (880–949) – Daijō Daijin, Regent
- Yoriko (頼子) (d. 936), consort of Emperor Seiwa
- Kazuko (佳珠子), consort of Emperor Seiwa
- Onshi (穏子) (885–954), consort of Emperor Daigo, and mother of Emperor Suzaku and Emperor Murakami

He was also married to Princess Sōshi (操子女王), a daughter of Imperial Prince Tadara (son of Emperor Saga).

Their children were

- Kanehira (兼平) (875–935) – Kunai-Kyō (宮内卿)
- Onshi (温子) (872–907), consort of Emperor Uda

His other children were

- Kamiko (佳美子) (d. 898), consort of Emperor Kōkō
- Yoshihira (良平)
- Shigeko (滋子), married to Minamoto no Yoshiari (son of Emperor Montoku)
- daughter, married to Imperial Prince Sadamoto (son of Emperor Seiwa), and mother of Minamoto no Kanetada (源兼忠)

== See also ==
- Fujiwara Regents
- Nihon Montoku Tennō Jitsuroku, one of the Six National Histories of Japan; edited by Fujiwara no Mototsune.
