= Ninna =

Period of Japanese history (885–889 CE)

Ninna (仁和) was a Japanese era name (年号, nengō, "year name") after Gangyō and before Kanpyō. This period spanned the years from February 885 through April 889. The reigning emperors were Kōkō-tennō (光孝天皇) and Uda-tennō (宇多天皇).

== Change of era ==
- January 20, 885 Ninna gannen (仁和元年): The new era name was created to mark an event or series of events. The previous era ended and the new one commenced in Gangyō 9, on the 21st day of the 2nd month of 885.

== Events of the Ninna era ==
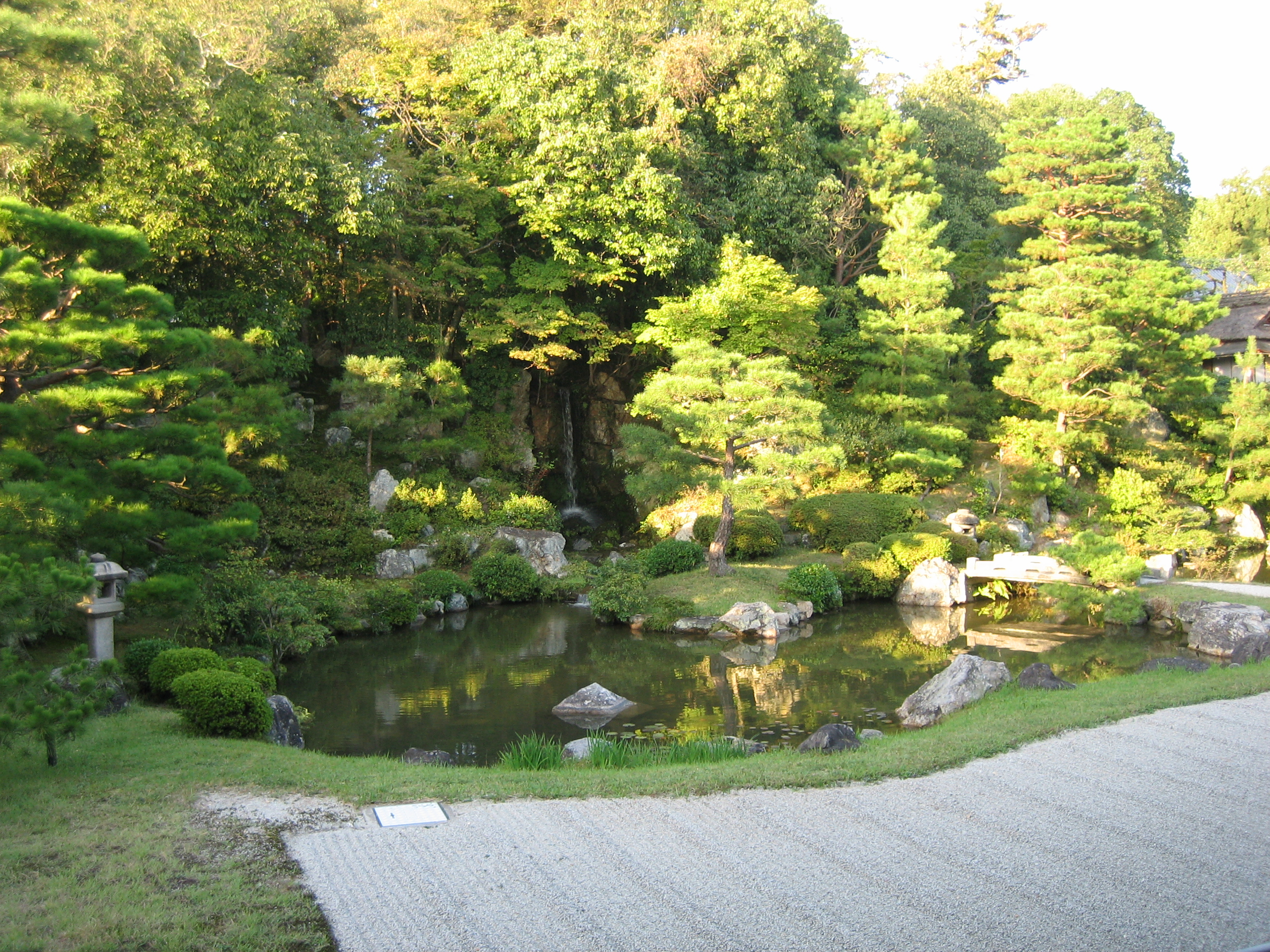
A garden at Ninna-ji.

- January 11, 887 (Ninna 2, 14th day of the 12th month): Kōkō traveled to Seri-gawa to practice falconry. He very much enjoyed this kind of hunting, and he often took time for this kind of activity.
- September 17, 887 (Ninna 3, 26th day of the 8th month): Kōkō died at the age of 57. Kōkō's third son received the succession (senso). Shortly thereafter, Emperor Uda formally acceded to the throne (sokui).
- May 12, 887 (Ninna 3, 17th day of the 11th month): Mototsune asks Uda for permission to retire from his duties; but the emperor is said to have responded, "My youth limits my ability to govern; and if you stop offering me your good counsel, I will be obliged to abdicate and to retire to a monastery." Therefore, Mototsune continued to serve as the new emperor's kampaku.
- 887 (Ninna 4, 8th month): Construction of the newly created Buddhist temple of Ninna-ji (仁和寺) was completed; and a former disciple of Kōbō-daishi was installed as the new abbot.

== Notes ==
Preceded by Gangyō	Era or nengō Ninna; 885–889	Succeeded by Kanpyō
