= Fujiwara no Nagatō =

This is about the 10th-century Japanese poet. For the 9th-century Japanese statesman, see Fujiwara no Nagayoshi.

Fujiwara no Nagatō (藤原 長能; 949 - 1009?), also known as Nagayoshi, was a Japanese poet and a court bureaucrat of the Heian period. He was the son of Fujiwara no Tomoyasu. His sister was the mother of Fujiwara no Michitsuna, writer of the diary, Kagerō Nikki (蜻蛉日記). Another sister was a mother of Sugawara no Takasue no musume (菅原孝標女), writer of the famous diary, Sarashina Nikki (更級日記). He was one of "Thirty-Six Poetic Geniuses" or "Thirty-six Poetry Immortals" (Sanjūrokkasen). His pupil on Waka was priest Nōin (能因).

Reputedly, he died due to anxiety over careless criticism of his poem by Fujiwara no Kintō, one of the most talented poets.
