= Jōgan =

Period of Japanese history (859–878 CE)

Jōgan (貞観) was a Japanese era name (年号, nengō; "year name") after Ten'an and before Gangyō. This period spanned the years from April 859 through April 878. The two reigning emperors were Seiwa-tennō (清和天皇) and Yōzei-tennō (陽成天皇).

== Change of era ==
- February 7, 859 Jōgan gannen (貞観元年): The new era name was created to mark an event or series of events. The previous era ended and the new one commenced in Ten'an 3, on the 15th day of the 4th month of 859.

== Events of the Jōgan era ==
- 859 (Jōgan 1, 1st month): All New Year's festivities were suspended because of the period of national mourning for the death of Emperor Montoku.
- 864 (Jōgan 6, 5th month): Mount Fuji erupted during 10 days, and it ejected from its summit an immense quantity of cinders and ash which fell back to earth as far away as the ocean at Edo bay. Many people perished and a great number of homes were destroyed. The volcanic eruption began on the side of Fuji-san closest to Mount Asama, throwing cinders and ash as far away as Kai Province.
- 869 (Jōgan 10): Yōzei was born, and he is named Seiwa's heir in the following year.
- July 9, 869 (May 26, Jōgan 11). The 869 earthquake and tsunami devastates a large part of the Sanriku coast near Sendai.
- 876 (Jōgan 17, 11th month): In the 18th year of Seiwa-tennō's reign (清和天皇18年), the emperor ceded his throne to his five-year-old son, which means that the young child received the succession (senso). Shortly thereafter, Emperor Yōzei formally acceded to the throne (sokui).

== See also ==
- Historic eruptions of Mount Fuji

== Notes ==
| Preceded by Ten'an | Era or nengō Jōgan; 859–877 | Succeeded by Gangyō |
