= Nihon Kiryaku =

Japanese historical text

Nihon Kiryaku (日本紀略), or Abbreviated Chronicles of Japan, is a historical text on Japanese history. The first part chronologizes the events listed in the Six National Histories and contains excerpts from it. The second part contains excerpts from other works, notes, and government acts. There are multiple versions of this text, though the name Nihon Kiryaku is usually used to refer to the version held by the Imperial Household Agency, extending from the Age of the Gods to the end of Emperor Go-Ichijō's reign, in 1036.

The first part was used, along with the Ruijū Kokushi, to reconstruct the missing text of Nihon Kōki.
