= Gangyō =

Period of Japanese history (877–885 CE)

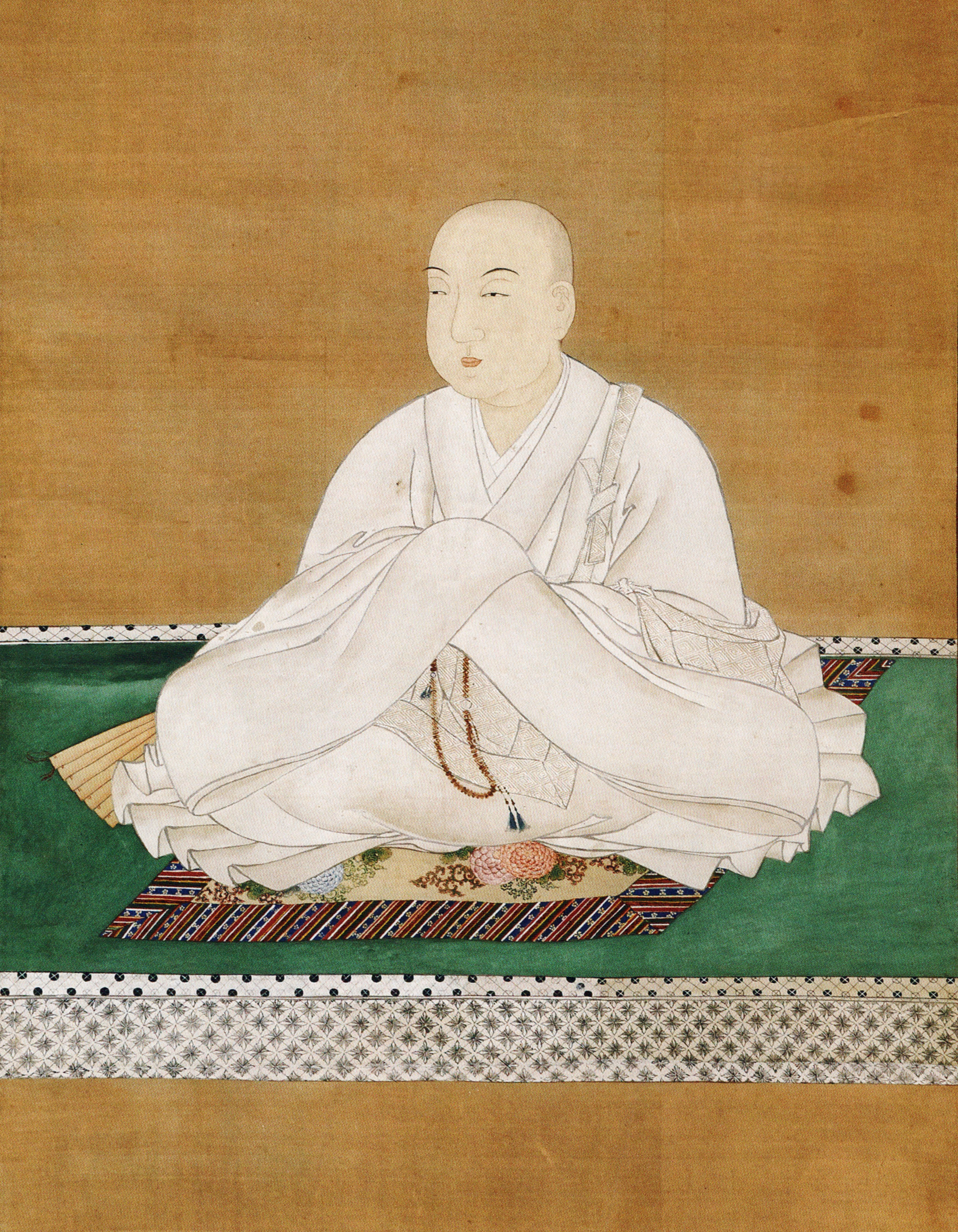
Portrait of the Emperor Seiwa

Gangyō (元慶), also known as Genkei, was a Japanese era name (年号, nengō; "year name") after Jōgan and before Ninna. This period spanned the years from April 877 through February 885. The reigning emperor was Yōzei-tennō (陽成天皇).

== Change of era ==
- January 18, 877 Gangyō gannen (元慶元年): The new era name was created to mark an event or series of events. The previous era ended and the new one commenced in Jōgan 19, on the 16th day of the 4th month of 877.

== Events of the Gangyō era ==
- January 20, 877 (Gangyō 1, 3rd day of the 1st month): Yōzei was formally enthroned at age 8; and the beginning of a new nengō was proclaimed. However, the new residence being constructed for the emperor had not been completed; and initially, he had to live elsewhere in the palace compound.
- 877 (Gangyō 1, 2nd month): Ambassadors from Korea arrived in Izumo Province; but they were turned back.
- 877 (Gangyō 1, 6th month): There was a great drought; and sacrifices were made at the temples of Hachiman, Kamo and other temples in Ise Province. Eventually, it rained.
- 878 (Gangyō 2): Seiwa became a Buddhist priest. His new priestly name was Soshin.
- March, 878 (Gangyō 2, 3rd month): Emishi people begin a rebellion at Dewa Province, called Gangyō-Rebellion.
- December 31, 878 (Gangyō 2, 4th day of the 12th month): Former-Emperor Seiwa died at age 31.
- 883 (Gangyō 7): In his early teens, Yōzei often spent time alone; and sometimes he would feed live frogs to snakes so that he could watch the reptile swallowing; or sometimes, he would find pleasure in setting dogs and monkeys to fight. In time, these amusements became more dangerous. He himself executed criminals. When he became angry, he sometimes chased after those who dared speak up; and he sometimes tried to use his sword. Fujiwara no Mototsune, the Kanpaku, used every possible opportunity to turn Yōzei towards more seemly conduct, but the emperor ignored him.
- 884 (Gangyō 8): The extravagant and dangerous habits of the emperor continued unabated. At one point, Mototsune came to the court and discovered that Yōzei had arranged a bizarre scenario for his diversion: He ordered some men to climb high into trees, and then he ordered others to use sharp lances to poke at them until they fell to their deaths. This extraordinary event convinced Motosune that the emperor was too "undignified" to reign. Mototsune reluctantly realized that someone needed to devise a strategy for deposing the emperor. Shortly thereafter, Mototsune approached Yōzei and remarked that it must be boring to be so often alone, and then Mototsune suggested that the emperor might be amused by a horse race. Yōzei was attracted to this proposition, and he eagerly encouraged Mototsune to set a time and place for the event. It was decided that this special amusement for the emperor would take place on the 4th day of the 2nd month of Gangyō-8.
- March 4, 884 (Gangyō 8, 4th day of the 2nd month): The pretext of a special horse race enticed the emperor to leave his palace. Yōzei traveled in a carriage which was quickly surrounded by a heavy guard. The carriage was redirected to "Yoseí-in" palace at "Ni zio", a town situated a short distance to the south-west of Miyako. Mototsune confronted the emperor, explaining that his demented behavior made him incapable of reigning, and that he was being dethroned. At this news, Yōzei cried sincerely, which did attract feelings of compassion from those who witnessed his contrition.

In the 8th year of Emperor Yōzei's reign (陽成天皇8年), the emperor was deposed; and scholars then construed that the succession (senso) was received by the third son of former Emperor Ninmyō, who was then age 55.

- March 23, 884 (Gangyō 8, 23rd day of the 2nd month): Emperor Kōkō is said to have acceded to the throne (sokui).
- 885 (Gangyō 9): The era name was changed accordingly in 885.

== Notes ==
Preceded by Jōgan	Era or nengō Gangyō; 877–885	Succeeded by Ninna
