= Emperor Uda =

Emperor of Japan from 887 to 897

Emperor Uda 宇多天皇
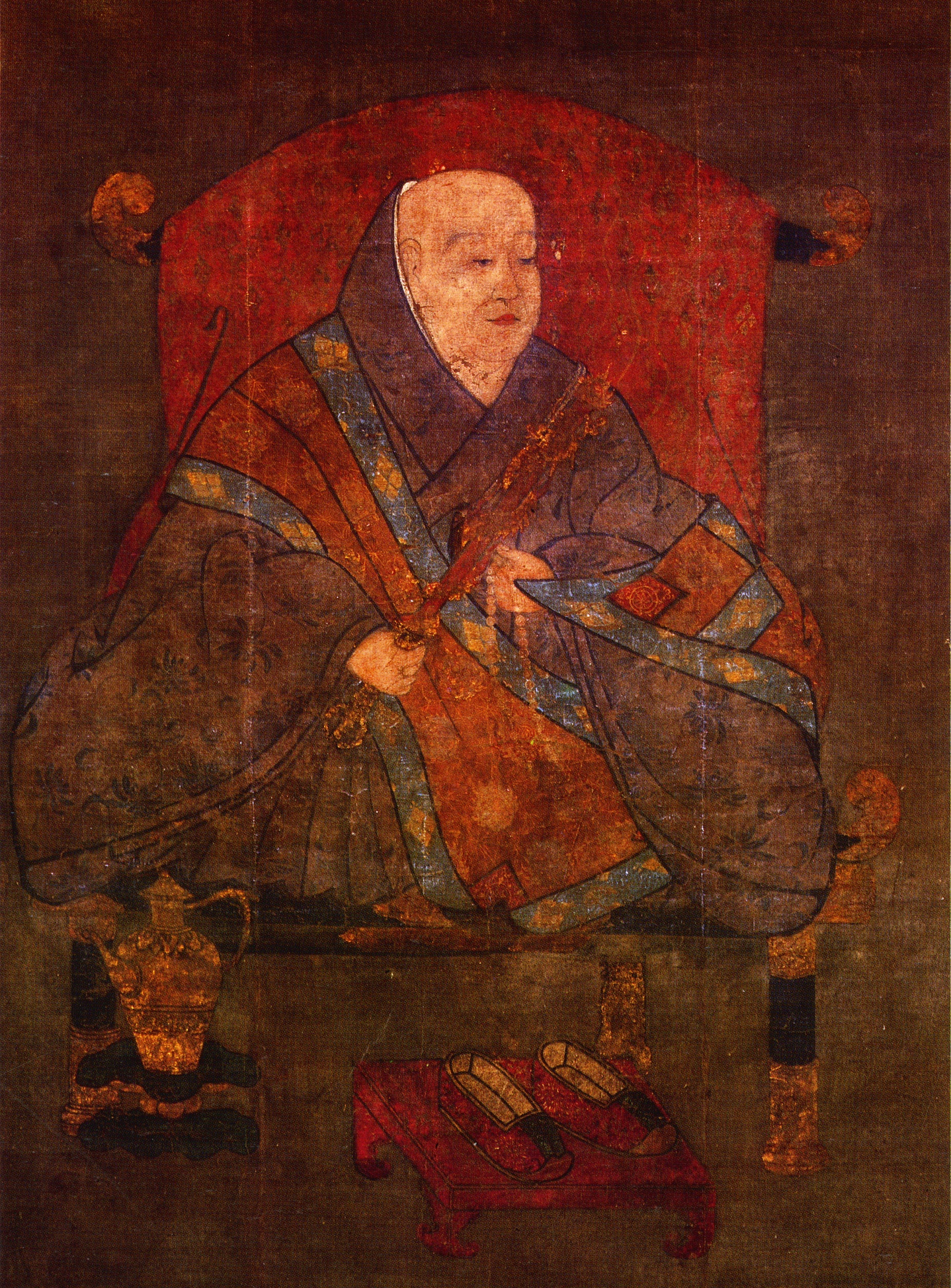

Emperor of Japan
- Reign: September 17, 887 – August 4, 897
- Enthronement: December 5, 887
- Predecessor: Kōkō
- Successor: Daigo
- Born: June 10, 866; Heian Kyō (Kyōto)
- Died: September 3, 931 (aged 65); Buddhist temple of Ninna-ji (仁和寺)
- Burial: Ōuchiyama no misasagi (大内山陵) (Kyoto)
- Issue more...: Emperor Daigo
Posthumous name
- Tsuigō: Emperor Uda (宇多院 or 宇多天皇)
- House: Imperial House of Japan
- Father: Emperor Kōkō
- Mother: Hanshi

Emperor Uda (宇多天皇, Uda-tennō; June 10, 866 – September 3, 931) was the 59th emperor of Japan, according to the traditional order of succession. Uda's reign spanned the years from 887 through 897.

Before his ascension to the Chrysanthemum Throne, his personal name (imina) was Sadami (定省) or Chōjiin-tei.

== Biography ==
=== Early life ===
Emperor was the seventh son of Emperor Kōkō, and his mother was Empress Dowager Hanshi (daughter of Prince Nakano, son of Emperor Kanmu). His father, Emperor Kōkō, was the great-uncle of the previous Emperor Yōzei. Having ascended the throne after Yōzei was forced to abdicate, Emperor Kōkō felt that the throne should return to the legitimate line, such as Prince Sadayasu, Emperor Yōzei's younger brother by the same mother, and in June 884, he bestowed the surname Minamoto upon 26 princes and princesses in his own direct line, demoting them to commoner status. Prince Sadami was one of them, and was known as Minamoto no Sadami. However, before could formally proclaim a successor, Kōkō fell seriously ill in 887, three years after his enthronement. Regent Fujiwara no Mototsune stated that the emperor's preference was for Sadami rather than Sadayasu. Sadayasu was close to the main line of the imperial family and was also Mototsune's nephew, but his mother, Fujiwara no Takaiko, was not on good terms with Mototsune, despite being their full sister, so he was avoided. On the other hand, Mototsune himself was not particularly fond of Sadami, but Sadami was the adopted son of Mototsune's close half-sister, Fujiwara no Yoshiko, and Yoshiko, who had strong influence in the imperial court as a Naishi no Kami (a lady-in-waiting to the emperor), strongly recommended him, so the court decided. There were also problems with the younger brother Sadami succeeding to the throne ahead of his older brother Minamoto no Koretada, so the emperor accepted the recommendation submitted by Mototsune and other ministers and appointed him as Crown Prince. On August 25, Sadami was reinstated as a member of the imperial family and received the title of Imperial Prince. The following day, the 26th, he was appointed Crown Prince, but on that same day, Emperor Kōkō died, so Sadami ascended the throne and was officially enthroned on November 17.

=== The Akō controversy ===
Emperor Uda lacked experience, and Fujiwara no Mototsune who had served as regent for four generations, held all political power. Shortly after the enthronement ceremony, on November 21, Emperor Uda issued an imperial decree instructing Mototsune to continue in his position as regent. However, the Emperor, together with Tachibana no Hiromi, then issued a second edict equating "Kanpaku" with the title of "Ako". Ako, which comes from the Chinese title a-heng, was intended to be just an honorific title without any official duties, which would effectively sideline Mototsune from the government. However, the court was dominated by the Fujiwara clan, and those not of the clan were afraid of their influence, so Emperor Uda's interpretation of the title was not accepted, and he was forced to revoke the edict in June 888. The controversy ended with Fujiwara no Mototsune being made kanpaku and the term "Ako" removed from the imperial edict. Uda attempted to reconcile the situation by having Mototsune's daughter, Fujiwara no Onshi, enter the imperial court, and finally calmed the situation in October. It was only after Mototsune died in 891, that Uda was able to begin his direct rule. In 894, Emperor Uda established Ninna-ji as an imperial temple.

Emperor Uda also appointed Mototsune's eldest son, Fujiwara no Tokihira, as a councilor, while also promoting individuals from outside the main line of the Fujiwara clan, such as Minamoto no Yoshiari, Sugawara no Michizane, and Fujiwara no Yasunori. During this period, the dispatch of Japanese missions to Tang China was suspended, envoys to various provinces to inquire about the suffering of the people were sent, the system of allowing entry into the imperial court was established, the Nihon Sandai Jitsuroku and Ruijū Kokushi official national histories were compiled, and numerous government offices were consolidated or abolished.

=== Abdication ===
On August 4, 897, Emperor Uda suddenly proclaimed his Crown Prince Atsuhito to be of age, abdicated the throne on the same day, and became the retired emperor. While it was once widely believed that his sudden abdication was to devote himself to Buddhism, as Uda himself had written that he was deeply shocked by the death of Minister of the Right Minamoto no Yoshiari; however, the action enabled him to secure the succession in his own lineage before demands arose from the Fujiwara clan that he select a candidate whom they favored. This is reinforced by the fact that he instructed the newly enthroned Emperor Daigo, to appoint his younger sister, Princess Tamako, as his principal consort, preventing the main line of the Fujiwara Hok-ke from becoming his maternal relatives. Furthermore, in the appointments made just before his abdication, he appointed Sugawara no Michizane as Provisional Grand Councilor, placing him second only to Fujiwara Tokihira, who held the highest position in the Grand Council of State as Grand Councilor. He then ordered both Tokihira and Michizane to serve as Inspectors of the Imperial Household, instructing them to jointly lead the government. However, this appointment was unpopular with the powerful court nobles, leading to an incident where some court officials refused to perform their duties. Michizane pleaded with Emperor Uda to order these court officials to return to service, and the new government finally began.

In 899, ex-Emperor Uda took the tonsure at Tō-ji and entered Ninna-ji as a monk. He made pilgrimages to Mount Kōya, Mount Hiei, and the Kumano Sanzan.

In January 901, Sugawara no Michizane was exiled to Dazaifu on suspicion of attempting to place Prince Tokiyo, Uda's son and his own son-in-law, on the throne. Upon receiving this news, the ex-emperor rushed to the Imperial Palace, but the gates were tightly closed, and the fate of Michizane was decided there. Daigo had no male heir at the time; however, Daigo resented the growing influence of Michizane, and by extension the continued meddling of his father in political affairs. When Fujiwara no Tokihira, who had continuously restrained Uda's actions, died in 909, Uda regained influence over the court.

On April 22, 913, he held a large-scale poetry contest, the "Teiji-in Poetry Contest," in the imperial palace. This helped to promote the flourishing of Japanese culture. As Daigo's health deteriorated, there were instances where Uda acted as his representative in governing affairs. Then, when Daigo died in 930, Uda became regent to the new emperor, Emperor Suzaku.

Ex-emperor Uda died on September 3, 931 at the age of 65. His diary Kanpyō Gyoki is an important source of information on this period in Japanese history.

Uda had five Imperial consorts and 20 Imperial children. Particularly important sons include:

- Prince Atsuhito (884–930)
- Prince Atsuzane (敦実親王) (893–967)

=== Uda Genji ===
In ancient Japan, there were four noble clans, the Gempeitōkitsu (源平藤橘). One of these clans, the Minamoto clan (源氏), is also known as Genji. Some of Uda's grandchildren were granted the surname Minamoto, the most used surname for former Japanese royalty. In order to distinguish Uda's descendants from other Genji, they became known as the Uda Genji (宇多源氏), some of which moved to Ōmi Province and became known as Sasaki clan (佐々木氏) or Ōmi Genji (近江源氏).

Among the Uda Genji, Minamoto no Masazane (源雅信), a son of Prince Atsumi (敦実親王) succeeded in the court. Masazane became sadaijin (Minister of the Left). One of Masazane's daughters, Minamoto no Rinshi (源倫子) married Fujiwara no Michinaga and from this marriage three empresses dowagers and two regents (sesshō) were born.

From Masanobu, several kuge families originated including the Niwata, Ayanokōji, Itsutsuji, Ōhara and Jikōji. From his fourth son Sukeyosi, the Sasaki clan originated, and thus Kyōgoku clan originated. These descendants are known as Ōmi Genji today. From this line, Sasaki Takauji made a success at the Muromachi shogunate and the Amago clan originated from his brother.

== Tomb of Emperor Uda ==
Emperor Uda was cremated at a site in Narutaki Utanotani, Ukyō-ku, Kyoto. After cremation, the remains were covered with earth without the collection of bones, and thus the mausoleum was established. Its original location was quickly lost, and it was not until the end of the Edo period that the current Ouchiyama Mausoleum was designated. It is formally named Kaguragaoka no Higashi no misasagi. According to the Imperial Household Agency, its form is a square mound.

=== Events of Uda's life ===
Uda's father, Emperor Kōkō, demoted his sons from the rank of imperial royals to that of subjects in order to reduce the state expenses, as well as their political influence. Sadami was given the clan name of Minamoto and named Minamoto no Sadami. Later, in 887, when Kōkō needed to appoint his successor, Sadami was once again promoted to the Imperial Prince rank with support of kampaku Fujiwara no Mototsune, since Sadami was adopted by a half-sister of Mototsune. After the death of his father in November of that year, Sadami-shinnō ascended to the throne.

- September 17, 887 (Ninna 3, 26th day of the 8th month): Emperor Kōkō died; and his third son received the succession (senso). Shortly thereafter, Emperor Uda formally acceded to the throne (sokui).
- December 5, 887 (Ninna 3, 17th day of the 11th month): Mototsune asked Uda for permission to retire from his duties; but the emperor is said to have responded, "My youth limits my ability to govern; and if you stop offering me your good counsel, I will be obliged to abdicate and to retire to a monastery." Therefore, Mototsune continued to serve as the new emperor's kampaku.

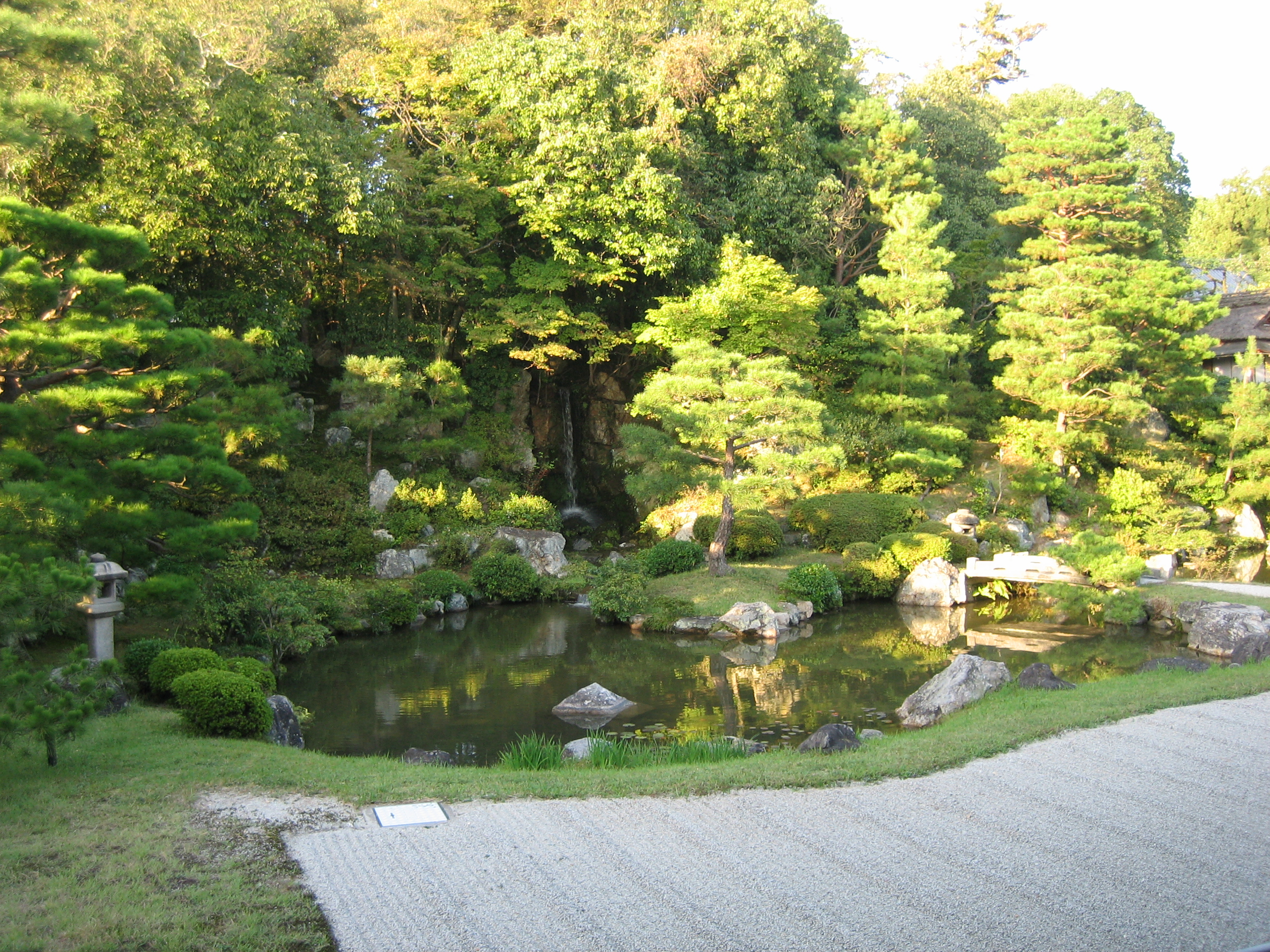
A garden at Ninnaji

- 888 (Ninna 4, 8th month): Construction of the newly created Buddhist temple of Ninna-ji (仁和寺) was completed; and a former disciple of Kōbō-daishi was installed as the new abbot.
- 889 (Kanpyō 1, 10th month): The former emperor Yōzei became deranged, and afflicted by mental illness. Yōzei would enter the palace and address courtiers he would meet with the greatest rudeness. He became increasingly furious. He garroted women with the strings of musical instruments and then threw the bodies into a lake. While riding on horseback, he directed his mount to run over people. Sometimes he simply disappeared into the mountains where he chased wild boars and red deer.

In the beginning of Uda's reign, Mototsune held the office of kampaku (or chancellor). Emperor Uda's reign is marked by a prolonged struggle to reassert power by the Imperial Family away from the increasing influence of the Fujiwara, beginning with the death of Mototsune in 891. Records show that shortly thereafter, Emperor Uda assigned scholars Sukeyo and Kiyoyuki, supporters of Mototsune, to provincial posts in the remote provinces of Mutsu and Higo respectively. Meanwhile, non-Fujiwara officials mainly from the Minamoto family were promoted to prominent ranks, while his trusted counselor, Sugawara no Michizane rapidly rose in rank within five years to reach the third rank in the court, and supervision of the Crown Prince's household. Meanwhile, Mototsune's son and heir, Fujiwara no Tokihira, rose in rank, but only just enough to prevent an open power struggle.

Meanwhile, Emperor Uda attempted to return Court politics to the original spirit envisioned in the Ritsuryō Codes, while reviving intellectual interest in Confucian doctrine and culture. In the seventh month of 896, Emperor Uda dispatched Sugawara no Michizane to review prisoners in the capitol and provide a general amnesty for the wrongfully accused, in keeping with Chinese practices. Emperor Uda also issued edicts reinforcing peasant land rights from encroachment by powerful families in the capital or monastic institutions, while auditing tax collections made in the provinces.

Emperor Uda stopped the practice of sending ambassadors to China (遣唐使; 'ken-toh-shi'). The emperor's decision was informed by what he understood as persuasive counsel from Sugawara Michizane.

The Special Festival of the Kamo Shrine was first held during Uda's reign.

When determining promotions and rewards for palace guards who have been on duty long hours and have good reputations, do not hold rigidly to precedents; just avoid the words of women and the advice of lesser men ... When foreign [literally "barbarian"] guests must be received, greet them from behind a curtain; do not face upon them directly. I have already made an error with Li Huan [a Chinese summoned to court in 896] ... Do not select as provincial officials those who request appointment. Only allow to serve those who have experience in the various offices and are known to be effective.

— Emperor Uda,

In 897, Uda abdicated in favor of his eldest son, Prince Atsuhito, who would later come to be known as Emperor Daigo. Uda left behind an hortatory will or testament which offered general admonitions or precepts for his son's guidance (see excerpt at right). The document praises Fujiwara no Tokihira as an advisor but cautions against his womanizing; and Sugawara no Michizane is praised as Uda's mentor. Both were assigned by Emperor Uda to look after his son until the latter reach maturity.

Three years later, he entered the Buddhist priesthood at age 34 in 900. Having founded the temple at Ninna-ji, Uda made it his new home after his abdication.

Decorative emblems (kiri) of the Hosokawa clan are found at Ryōan-ji. Uda is amongst six other emperors entombed near what had been the residence of Hosokawa Katsumoto before the Ōnin War.

His Buddhist name was Kongō Kaku. He was sometimes called "the Cloistered Emperor of Teiji (亭子の帝)", because the name of the Buddhist hall where he resided after becoming a priest was called Teijiin.

Uda died in 931 (Shōhei 1, 19th day of the 7th month) at the age of 65.

=== Kugyō ===
Kugyō (公卿) is a collective term for the very few most powerful men attached to the court of the Emperor of Japan in pre-Meiji eras.

In general, this elite group included only three to four men at a time. These were hereditary courtiers whose experience and background would have brought them to the pinnacle of a life's career.

During Uda's reign, this apex of the Daijō-kan included:

- Kampaku, Fujiwara no Mototsune (藤原基経; 836–891)
- Daijō-daijin, Fujiwara no Mototsune
- Sadaijin, Minamoto no Tōru (源融)
- Sadaijin, Fujiwara no Yoshiyo (藤原良世)
- Udaijin, Minamoto no Masaru (源多)
- Udaijin, Fujiwara no Yoshiyo (藤原良世)
- Udaijin, Minamoto no Yoshiari (源能有)
- Naidaijin (not appointed)
- Dainagon

== Eras of Uda's reign ==
The years of Uda's reign are more specifically identified by more than one era name, or nengō.

- Ninna (885–889)
- Kanpyō (889–898)

== Consorts and children ==
Consort (Nyōgo): Fujiwara no Onshi (藤原温子; 872–907), Fujiwara no Mototsune’s daughter

- Imperial Princess Kinshi (均子内親王; 890–910), married to Imperial Prince Atsuyoshi

Consort (Nyōgo): Fujiwara no Inshi (藤原胤子; d. 896), Fujiwara no Takafuji’s daughter

- First Son: Imperial Prince Atsugimi (敦仁親王; 885–930) later Emperor Daigo
- Fourth Son: Imperial Prince Atsuyoshi (敦慶親王; 887–930)
- Imperial Prince Atsukata (敦固親王; d. 926)
- Imperial Princess Jūshi (柔子内親王; 892–958), 25th Saiō in Ise Shrine (897–930)
- Eighth Son: Imperial Prince Atsumi (敦実親王; 893–967)

Consort (Nyōgo): Tachibana no Yoshiko/Gishi (橘義子), Tachibana no Hiromi's daughter

- Second Son: Imperial Prince Tokinaka (斉中親王; 885–891)
- Third Son: Imperial Prince Tokiyo (斉世親王; 886–927) later Imperial Prince Priest Shinjaku (真寂法親王)
- Imperial Prince Tokikuni (斉邦親王)
- Fourth Daughter: Imperial Princess Kunshi (君子内親王; d. 902), 10th Saiin in Kamo Shrine (893–902)

Consort (Nyōgo): Sugawara no Hiroko/Enshi (菅原衍子), Sugawara no Michizane’s daughter

- Minamoto no Junshi (源順子; 875–925) married Fujiwara no Tadahira

Consort (Nyōgo): Tachibana no Fusako (橘房子; d. 893)

Court Attendant (Koui): Minamoto no Sadako (源貞子), Minamoto no Noboru's daughter

- Imperial Princess Ishi (依子内親王; 895–936)

Court Attendant (Koui): Princess Norihime (徳姫女王), Prince Tōyo's daughter

- Imperial Princess Fushi (孚子内親王; d. 958)

Court Attendant (Koui): Fujiwara no Yasuko (藤原保子), Fujiwara no Arizane's daughter

- Imperial Princess Kaishi (誨子内親王; 894–952), married to Imperial Prince Motoyoshi (son of Emperor Yōzei)
- Imperial Princess Kishi (季子内親王; d. 979)

Court Attendant (Koui): Minamoto no Hisako (源久子)

Court Attendant (Koui): Fujiwara no Shizuko (藤原静子)

Lady-in-waiting: Fujiwara no Hōshi (藤原褒子), Fujiwara no Tokihira’s daughter

- Imperial Prince Masaakira (雅明親王; 920–929)
- Imperial Prince Noriakira (載明親王)
- Imperial Prince Yukiakira (行明親王; 926–948)

Court lady: A daughter of Fujiwara no Tsugukage, Ise (伊勢; 875/7 – c. 939)

- prince (died young)

(from unknown women)

- Imperial Prince Yukinaka (行中親王; d. 909)
- Imperial Princess Seishi (成子内親王; d. 979)
- Minamoto no Shinshi (源臣子)

== Ancestry ==
Ancestors of Emperor Uda

8. Emperor Saga (786–842)
4. Emperor Ninmyō (808–850)
9. Tachibana no Kachiko (786–850)
2. Emperor Kōkō (830–867)
10. Fujiwara no Fusatsugu
5. Fujiwara no Takushi (d. 839)
11. Fujiwara no Kazuko
1. Emperor Uda
12. Emperor Kanmu (737–806)
6. Prince Nakano (792–867)
13. Fujiwara no Kawako (d. 838)
3. Princess Hanshi (833–900)
7. Tōsō

== Notes ==
Japanese Imperial kamon — a stylized chrysanthemum blossom

== See also ==
- Emperor of Japan
- List of Emperors of Japan
- Imperial cult
- Emperor Go-Uda
- Kanpyō Gyoki

Regnal titles
Preceded by Emperor Kōkō	Emperor of Japan: Uda; 887–897	Succeeded by Emperor Daigo
