= Kanpyō (era) =

Period of Japanese history (889–898 CE)

Kanpyō (寛平, Kanpyō, Kanbyō, Kanpei, Kanbei), also romanized as Kampyō was a Japanese era name (年号, nengō, "year name") after Ninna and before Shōtai. This period spanned the years from April 889 through April 898. The reigning emperors were Uda-tennō (宇多天皇) and Daigo-tennō (醍醐天皇).

== Change of era ==
- February 4, 889 Kanpyō gannen (寛平元年): The new era name was created to mark an event or series of events. The previous era ended and the new one commenced in Ninna 5, on the 27th day of the 4th month of 889.

== Events of the Kanpyō era ==
- 889 (Kanpyō 1, 10th month): The former-Emperor Yōzei was newly attacked by the mental illness. Yōzei would enter the palace and address courtiers he would meet with the greatest rudeness. He became increasingly furious. He garroted women with the strings of musical instruments and then threw the bodies into a lake. While riding on horseback, he directed his mount to run over people. Sometimes he simply disappeared into the mountains, where he chased wild boars and red deer.
- August 4, 897 (Kanpyō 9, 3rd day of the 7th month): In the 10th year of Uda-tennō's reign (宇多天皇10年), Emperor Uda abdicated; and his eldest son received the succession (senso).
- August 6, 897 (Kanpyō 9, 5th day of the 7th month): Emperor Daigo formally acceded to the throne (sokui).

== Notes ==
Preceded by Ninna	Era or nengō Kanpyō; 889–898	Succeeded by Shōtai
