= Surviving Portions of Ornaments for Imperial Ceremonial Attire and Crowns =

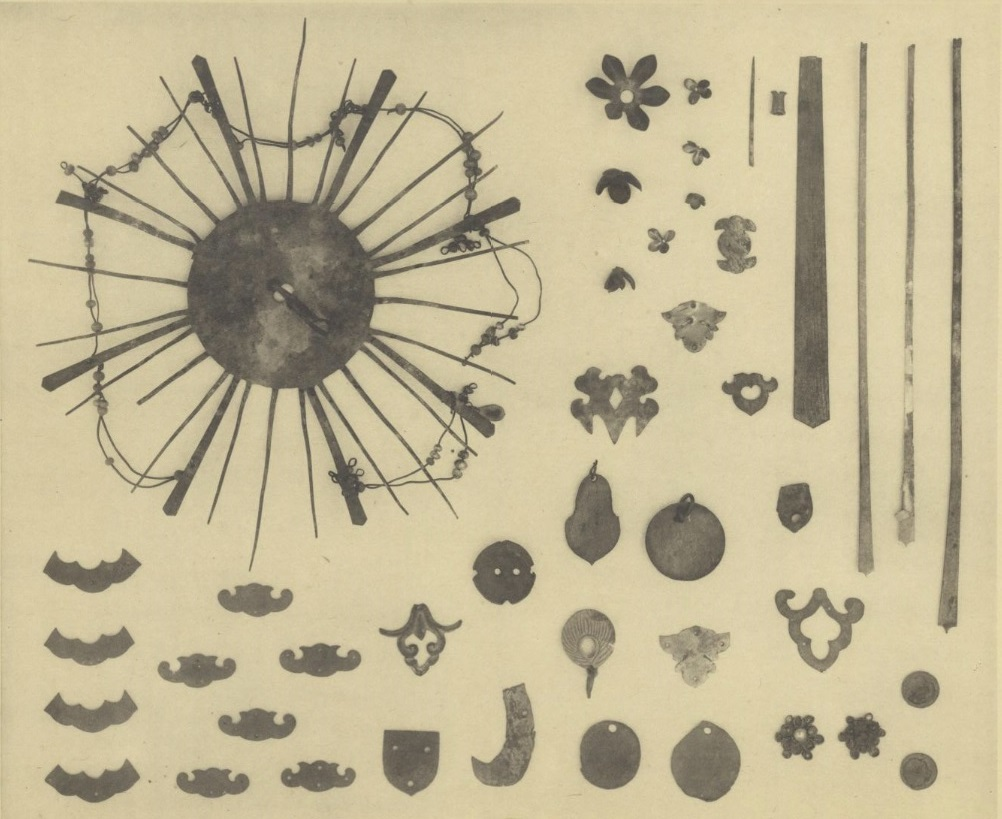
Surviving portions of ornaments for imperial crowns. The sun-shaped ornament is shown in the upper left of the image.

Surviving Portions of Ornaments for Imperial Ceremonial Attire and Crowns (礼服御冠残欠, Raifuku Onkanmuri Zanketsu) are fragments primarily consisting of the benkan (ceremonial crown) of Emperor Shōmu (r.724–749) and the ceremonial crown of Empress Kōmyō (701–760) of Japan. These items were damaged during the Kamakura period (1185–1333) when the crowns were removed from storage, and they have been preserved in their incomplete form. It has also been suggested that these remnants may include the crown of Empress Kōken (r.749–758; reascended as Empress Shōtoku, r.764–770) and fragments of ceremonial crowns belonging to various courtiers. They are part of the Shōsōin treasures.

Although the formal name is Surviving Portions of Ornaments for Imperial Ceremonial Attire and Crowns, the ceremonial attire itself has not survived. Therefore, in recent years, it has simply been referred to as Surviving Portions of Ornaments for Imperial Crowns (御冠残欠, Onkanmuri Zanketsu).

== History ==
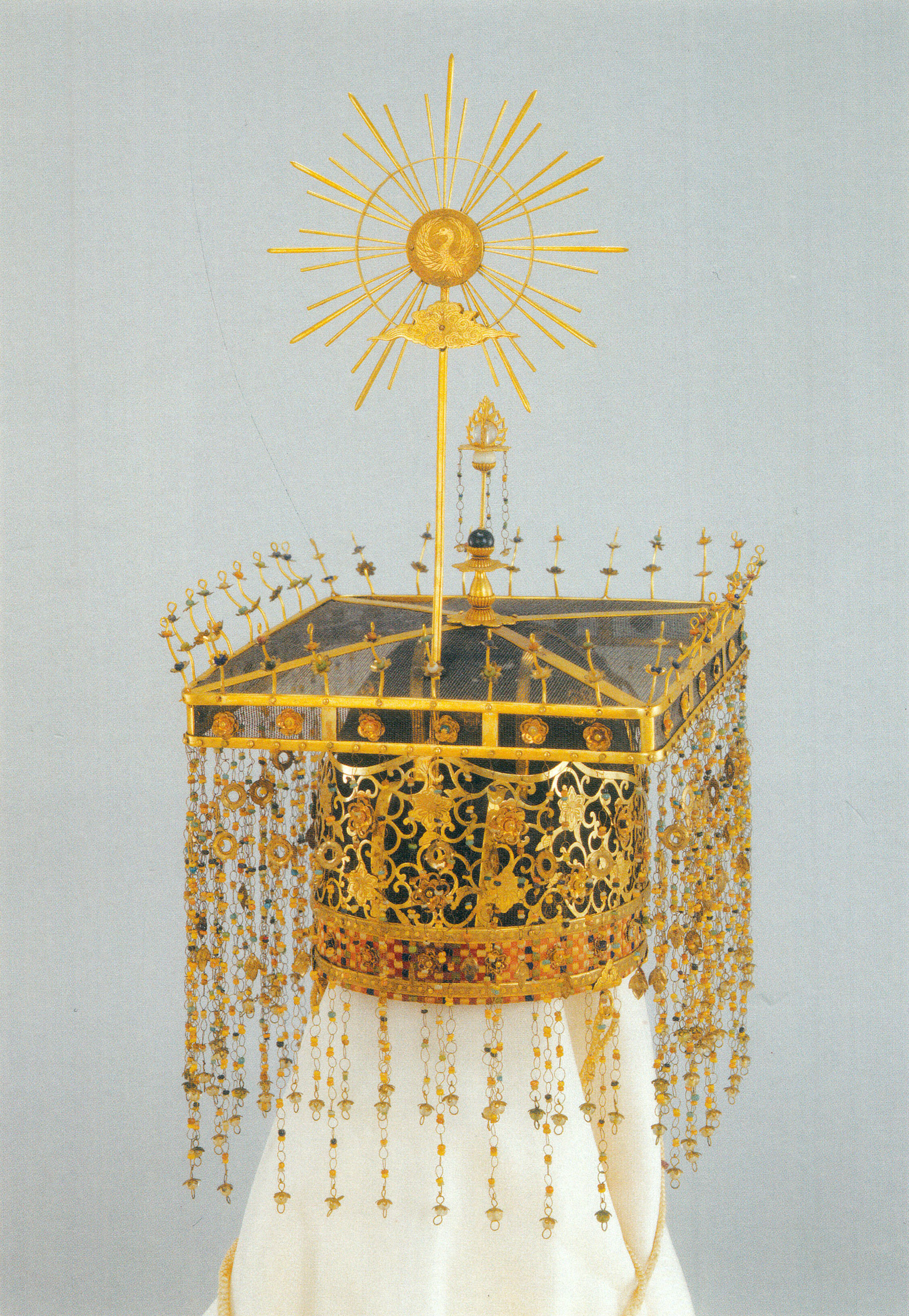
Benkan of Emperor Kōmei (reigned 1846-1867)

Among the surviving portions of ornaments for imperial ceremonial attire and crowns, a wooden tablet (mokuhai) has been preserved, which was found in a box containing the ceremonial attire (including crowns) of the Daijō Tennō (Retired Emperor Shōmu) and the Kōtaigō (Empress Dowager Kōmyō). The front of the tablet indicates that one complete set for each of them was stored in the box, while the back of the tablet bears the date "April 9, Tenpyō Shōhō 4" (752). This date corresponds to the day of the Eye-Opening Ceremony for the Great Buddha of Tōdai-ji. Therefore, it is understood that both sets were used on that occasion.

Although the crowns do not retain their original shape, surviving fragments include metal ornaments with motifs of the sun, phoenixes, auspicious clouds, flowers, and arabesque patterns, as well as pendant tassels (旒, ryū) made of pearls, coral, and lapis lazuli strung together with threads.

According to the Bakuryōshige (曝涼使解) of Enryaku 12 (793) and the Kanmotsushige (勘物使解) of Kōnin 2 (811), Emperor Shōmu's benkan (ceremonial crown) is described as: "Adorned with gold and silver jewels on black silk gauze (皂羅, kurinousuhata), with two black-purple braided cords (組纓, soei), and stored in a small octagonal red-lacquered box."

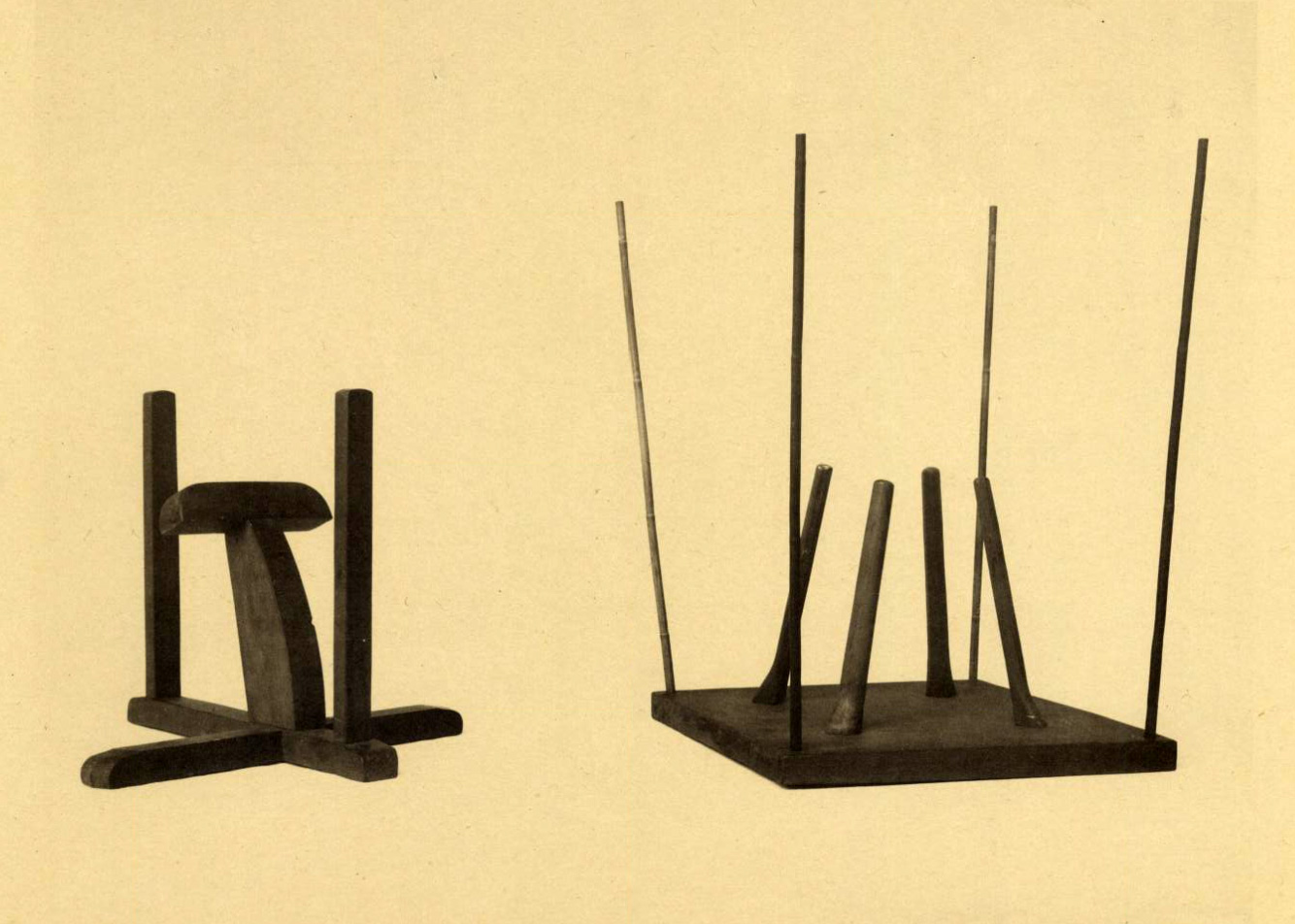
Crown stands believed to have held the crowns of Emperor Shōmu (right) and Empress Kōmyō (left), Shōsōin treasures.

The term kurinousuhata refers to black silk gauze and is believed to correspond to the part of the crown that covers the topknot (髻, motodori) known as a koji (巾子). This section is surrounded by decorations of gold and silver jewels, with two black-purple braided cords and it was stored in a small octagonal red-lacquered box. This small box still exists today.

Among the surviving fragments, it is difficult to determine which pieces belonged to Emperor Shōmu. However, the ryū (pendant tassels) made of large and small pearls interspersed with lapis lazuli beads in shades of blue, green, yellow, and red are believed to be from the benkan (ceremonial crown) of the emperor.

Additionally, a sun-shaped ornament is also thought to belong to Emperor Shōmu's benkan. Made of gilt bronze, it features eight rays, from which hang yōraku (beaded pendants) strung with pearls and lapis lazuli beads. Unlike later crowns, the sun does not feature a three-legged crow.

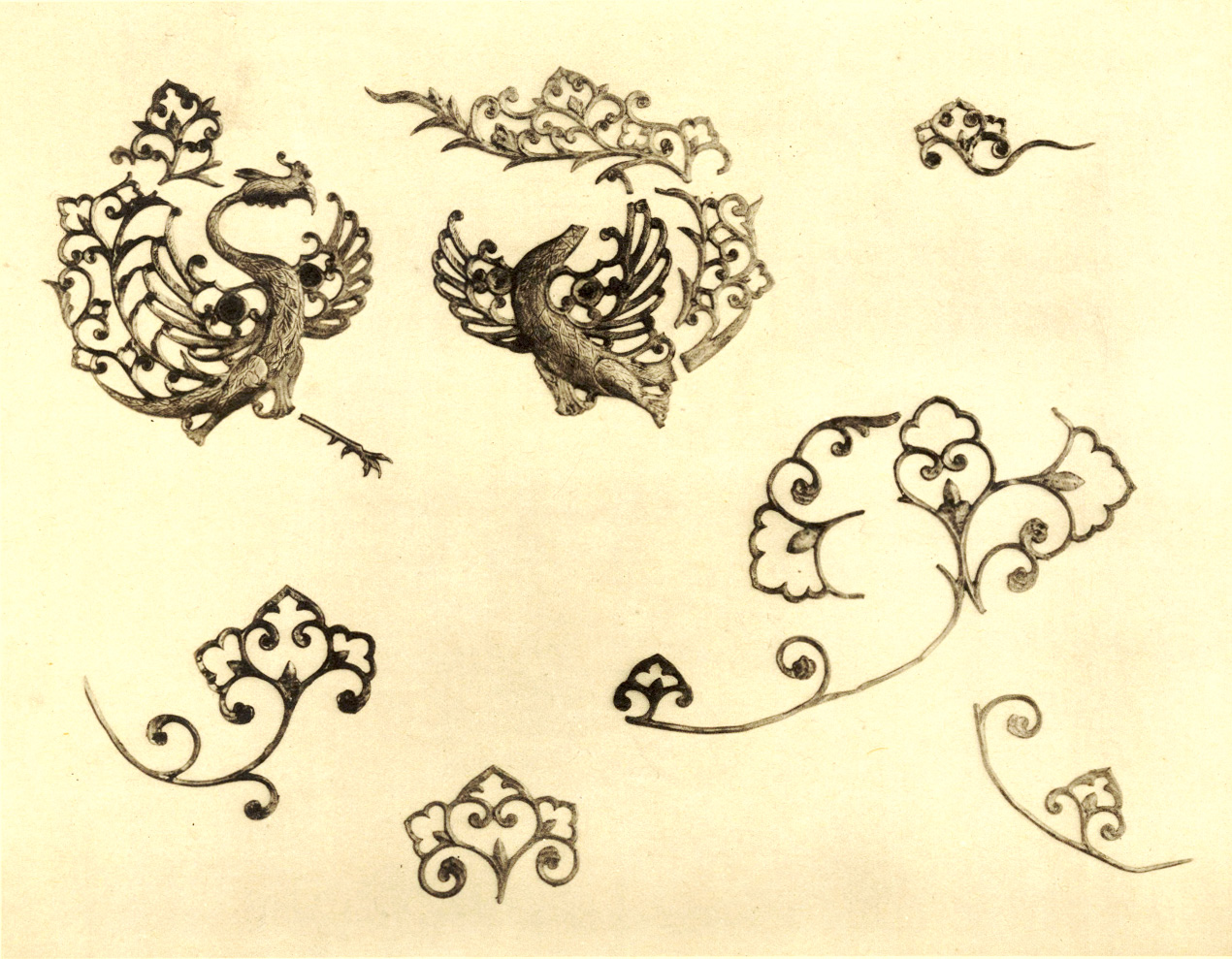
Phoenix and kudzu leaf patterns from the surviving portions of imperial crowns

According to the records in the Bakuryōshige, Empress Kōmyō's crown is described as: "Adorned with pure gold phoenixes and jewels in the shape of kudzu leaves made of gold and silver, with two white braided cords attached, and stored in a small hexagonal red-lacquered box." Among the surviving fragments, a gold phoenix ornament is thought to be from Empress Kōmyō's crown. Near the base of the wings, there are traces of a pair of inlaid jewels, suggesting that gemstones were originally embedded there.

In the third year of Ninji (1242), during preparations for the enthronement ceremony of Emperor Go-Saga, an inspection of ceremonial attire (raifuku goran) was conducted. The raifuku goran (礼服御覧) is a ritual in which the ceremonial attire to be worn by the emperor during the enthronement is examined beforehand. According to Heikoki, the diary of Taira no Tsunetaka (covering the years 1227–1246), it was discovered during this inspection that the benkan was damaged. The benkan stored in the Imperial Treasury (Kuraryō) had been targeted by thieves in previous years, who stole all the gold, silver, and jewels, leaving only fragments of silk gauze. This stolen benkan is believed to have been made during the reign of Emperor Seiwa (r. 858–876). Since a replacement was needed in time for the enthronement ceremony, and a model was required, the decision was made to retrieve Emperor Shōmu's benkan stored in the Shōsōin.

At this time, two jeweled crowns belonging to Emperor Shōmu and two belonging to empresses, totaling four crowns, along with 26 ceremonial crowns of court officials, were also retrieved. After the enthronement ceremony, these crowns were returned to the Shōsōin. However, during their return, the four imperial crowns suffered significant damage, as recorded in the Tōdai-ji Zokuyōroku (東大寺続要録), a temple chronicle from the Kamakura period.

These damaged crowns are what we now know as the surviving portions of the imperial crowns (onkanmuri zanketsu). Some theories suggest that the damage was not accidental but that parts were hastily repurposed to create Emperor Go-Saga's benkan.

According to the records mentioned above, there should have been only one benkan belonging to Emperor Shōmu. However, since one of the crowns with ryū (pendant tassels) was associated with Empress Kōken, it may have been mistakenly identified as a male emperor's benkan. The two empresses' jeweled crowns are thought to refer to Empress Kōmyō's ceremonial crown and Empress Kōken's ordinary crown (凡冠).

According to Hakuseki Sensei Shinsho (白石先生紳書), a collection of works by Arai Hakuseki (1657–1725), there is a description stating: "In the Nara Shōsōin, there is Emperor Shōmu's benkan, but thieves took it, stole the jewels and gold, and discarded the remains into a ditch. This occurred during the time of the official Itakura Shigemune." (Note: The original text reads: "奈良御倉に聖武の冕有盗取て玉を取金をとりて其餘は溝へうち捨たり所司板倉周防守時の事なり.")

On the other hand, the Tōdai-ji Sansō Kaifū Kanrei, a temple record, notes that a theft occurred on the 24th day of the intercalary 10th month of Keichō 17 (1612). At this time, the Kyoto Deputy (shoshidai) was Itakura Katsushige (Iga no Kami), the father of Itakura Shigemune. Therefore, some believe that the damage incurred during the retrieval in the third year of Ninji (1242) was not severe, and that the current state of damage progressed due to the theft in 1612.

== See also ==
- Benkan
- Imperial crown
