= Imperial Crown of Empress Go-Sakuramachi =

Crown of Empress Go-Sakuramachi (reigned 1762 - 1771) of Japan

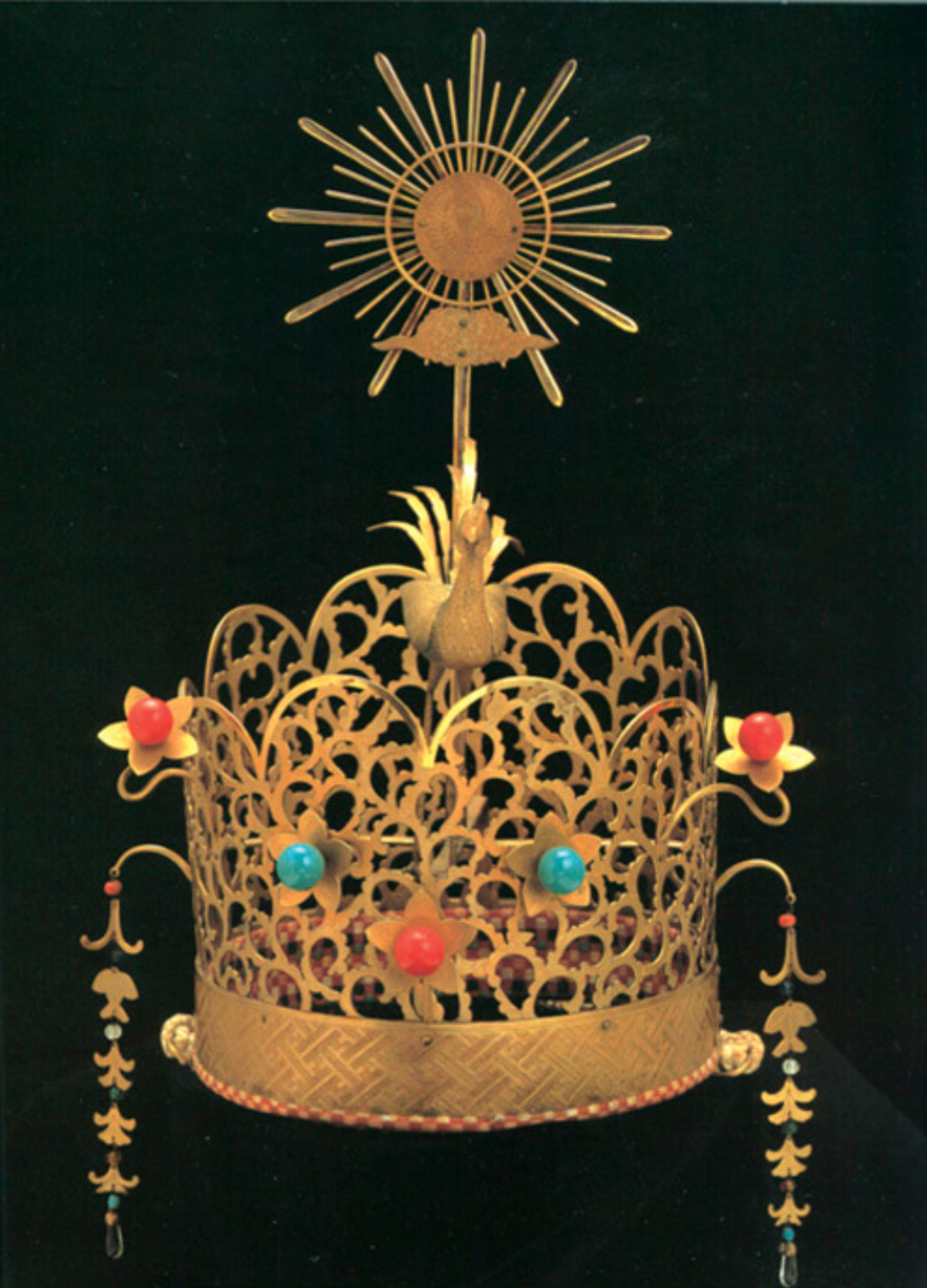

Details
- Country: Japan
- Made: 1763
- Owner: Japan's Imperial Household
- Material: Gilded copper, precious stone, coral, brocade, and glass

The Imperial Crown of Empress Go-Sakuramachi (後桜町天皇の宝冠) is a crown in the hōkan (宝冠) style worn by Empress Go-Sakuramachi (reigned 1762 - 1771) of Japan. It is designated as a Japanese Imperial Treasure (御物) and is not open to the public.

== History ==
The hōkan (lit. 'jeweled crown') is a crown worn by the female emperors of Japan during enthronement ceremonies, along with their ceremonial robes. It is the equivalent of the benkan worn by male emperors.

Empress Go-Sakuramachi was the first female emperor in about 120 years since Empress Meishō (reigned 1629 - 1643). However, Empress Meishō's crown had already been lost and its specifications were unknown. It was probably destroyed by fire along with the benkan when the Kyoto Imperial Palace was burned down in 1653.

According to the Record of Lord Motomitsu, the diary of Yanagiwara Motomitsu, Yamashina Yoritoki suggested that the crown of Empress Kōken (reigned 749 - 758, 764 - 770), which was in the Shōsōin Repository in Nara, be ordered as a reference, but this was rejected by the regent, Konoe Uchisaki.

Higuchi Motoyasu then suggested that the crown worn by the statue of Tōfukumonin (Tokugawa Masako), the mother of Empress Meishō, at Kōunji Temple in Higashiyama, be used as a reference, and this suggestion was adopted.

He then had the crown of the seated statue copied, and the hōkan of Empress Go-Sakuramachi was produced by adding a sun-shaped ornament to it.

== Features ==
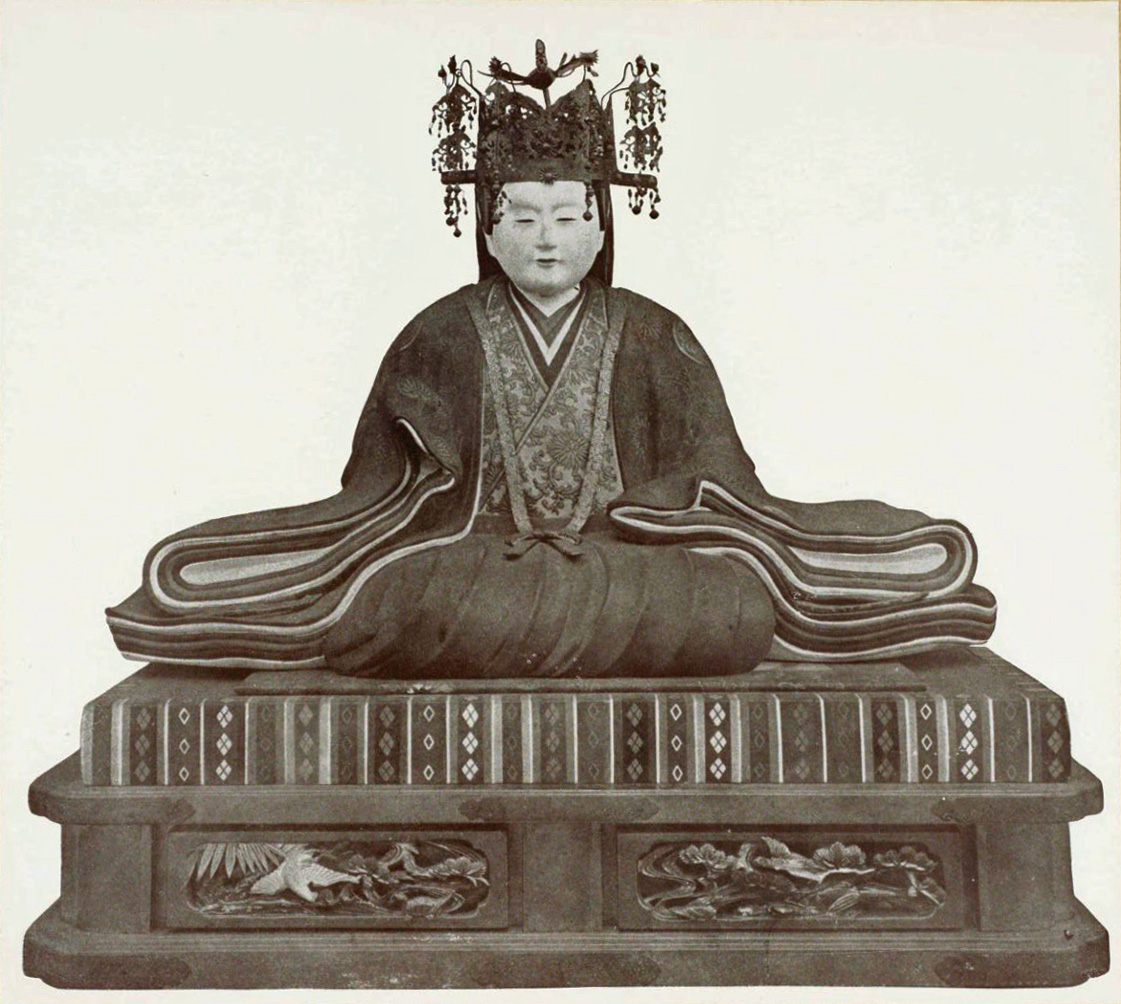
Seated statue of Tōfukumonin, 17th century, Kōunji collection

The hōkan of Empress Go-Sakuramachi does not have the black, thin silk koji (巾子, cap) that is found on the benkan. This is probably because women do not wear topknots and thus do not need a koji to hold them in place.

Another significant feature is the absence of the benban (冕板) board placed at the top of the crown and the chains (旒, ryū) that hang down from it. As described below, the hōkan in the imperial treasury (内蔵寮) of the Heian period (794 - 1185) had neither a benban nor chains, and thus Empress Go-Sakuramachi's crown is in keeping with the tradition of hōkan.

Manji tsunagi

The lower part of the gilt-bronze openwork (oshikazura) is engraved with lines in the design of manji-tsunagi (万字繋ぎ, lit. 'swastika chain'). The manji tsunagi was a new design popular in Japan during the Edo period (1603–1867), and was often used in the patterns of figured satin imported from China. The edge and back of the crown are covered with Japanese brocade with a design of waterfowl nests and checkered patterns (窼霰, kani arare).

The openwork carving with arabesque design is mountain-shaped, and 10 pieces are connected to form a ring, which is also similar to the crown of the seated statue of Tōfukumonin.

The front of the oshikazura is adorned with three three-dimensional five-petaled floral ornaments with a precious stone or coral in the center. On the left and right sides of them, two similar floral ornaments are attached to the tips of gilt bronze stems. Chains (瓔珞, yōraku) hang down from each side of the oshikazura.

In the center of the hōkan crown stands a gilt-bronze rod, at the end of which is a sun-shaped ornament, and below it is an auspicious cloud ornament, elements not found on the seated statue of Tōfukumonin.

A three-dimensional phoenix-shaped ornament is attached to the front of the crown. A chain is thought to have originally hung from the beak of the phoenix, but it seems to have been lost.

== Comparison with other hōkan ==
The July 4, 1036 page of Minamoto no Morofusa's diary, Doyū Ki (土右記), describes the characteristics of the crown of a female emperor, which was kept in the imperial treasury at the time. According to the description, the crown has a hira-koji (平巾子, low cap) and a phoenix ornament, but it stands slightly to the left, suggesting that the other ornament originally on the right was lost. There is no description of a sun or cloud ornament.

There are three flower-shaped ornaments on the oshikazura, and it is said that they are decorated with branch-shaped ornaments, so there must have been three ornaments with flowers on the tips of the branches on the oshikazura.

The lack of a benban board and chains is similar to the crown of Empress Go-Sakuramachi, but it has recently been questioned whether this crown was not intended for a female emperor but for an empress (the emperor's wife).

If the crown was intended for a female emperor, it would be that of Empress Kōken of the Nara period (710–794). However, the crown of Empress Kōken, which was presented to Shōsōin, is thought to have had a benban and chains.

The details of Empress Meishō's hōkan are unknown, but in the September 12, 1630 page of Nijō Yasumichi's diary, Records of Lord Yasumichi (Yasumichi Kō Ki), there is a description of Emperor Meishō's crown as a sun-shaped crown (日形御冠). Thus, it is thought that Empress Meishō's hōkan had a sun-shaped ornament.

== See also ==
- Benkan
- Kanmuri (headwear)
- Raikan

== Bibliography ==
- Sakurai, Shu (1915). 即位大嘗典礼史要 [A Compendium of the History of the Enthronement and Daijosai Rites] (in Japanese). Hakuikudo. doi:10.11501/950848.
- Matsudaira, Norimasa (2006). 図説宮中柳営の秘宝 [Illustrated: Treasures of the Imperial Family and the Shoguns] (in Japanese). Kawade Shobō Shinsha. ISBN 978-4-309-76081-0.
- Takeda, Sachiko; Tsuda, Daisuke (2016-08-20). 礼服―天皇即位儀礼や元旦の儀の花の装い― [Ceremonial Dress: floral attire for the emperor's accession ceremony and New Year's Day ceremony] (in Japanese). Osaka University Press. ISBN 978-4-87259-551-2.
