= Benkan =

Ceremonial crown formerly worn by Japanese emperors

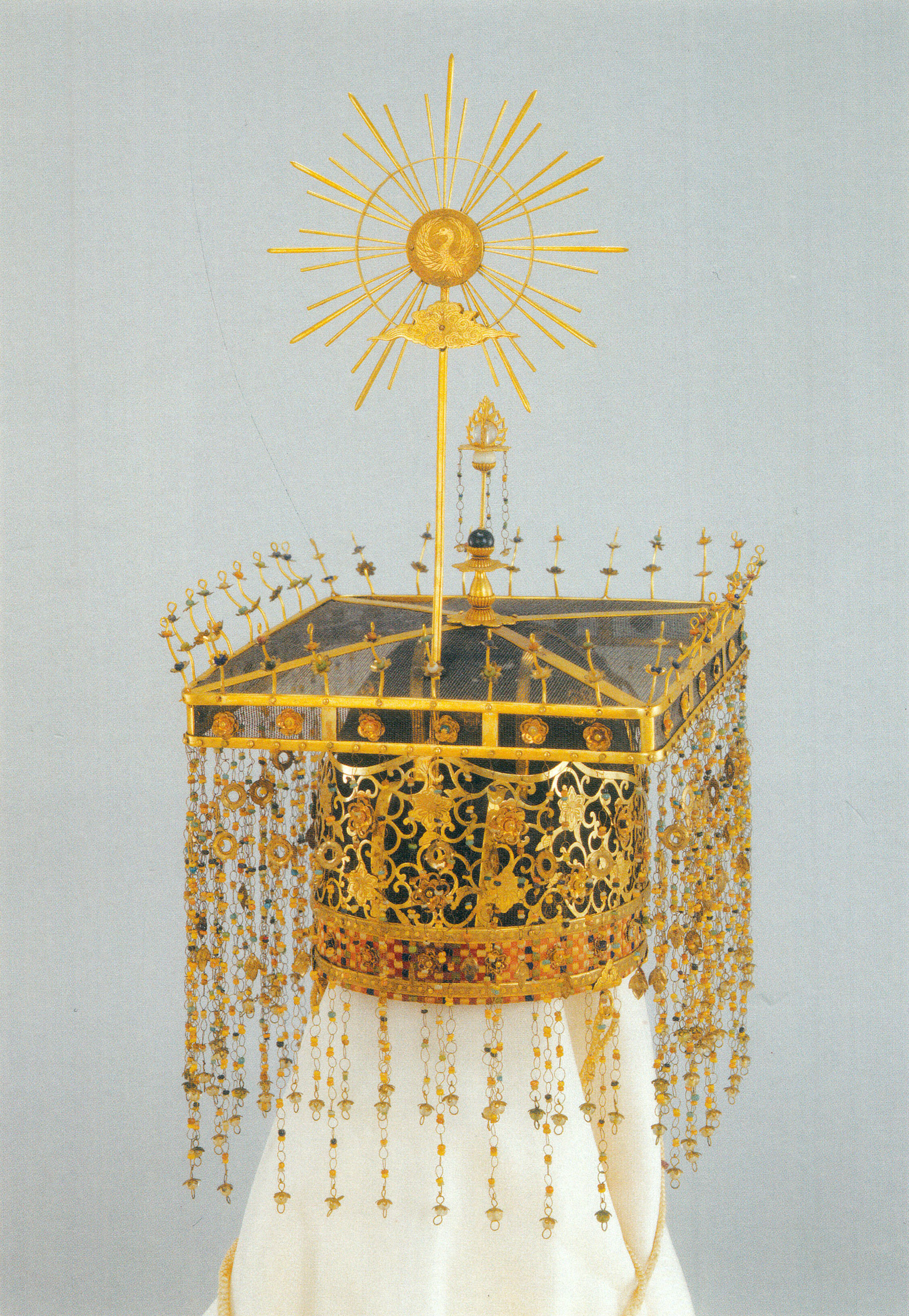
Benkan of Emperor Kōmei

The benkan (冕冠; lit. 'crown') is a type of ceremonial crown formerly worn by Japanese emperors and crown princes. It is also called tama no kōburi (玉乃冠; lit. 'jeweled crown').

Although gilt-bronze crowns and crown caps are known from elite burials of the Kofun period, the benkan proper is first clearly associated with the imperial court in the early 8th century. The Shoku Nihongi records that Emperor Shōmu wore the benpuku (冕服; ceremonial crown and robes) for the first time at the New Year's court ceremony of 732. Later Japanese benkan combined features of the Chinese mianguan, such as a crown board and pendant jeweled ornaments, with distinctive Japanese elements, most notably a sun-shaped ornament on the top of the crown.

The benkan was worn together with the imperial ceremonial robe called kon'e at enthronement and chōga (朝賀, New Year's court audience) ceremonies. Its last use was at the enthronement ceremony of Emperor Kōmei in 1847, and it has not been worn since.

Related imperial crowns included the hōkan (宝冠; lit. 'precious crown') for a female emperor and the nikkeikan (日形冠; lit. 'sun-shaped crown') for a child emperor.

Edo-period examples of the benkan, hōkan, and nikkeikan survive as imperial treasures (御物) and are not ordinarily open to public view. They have, however, occasionally been displayed in exhibitions commemorating imperial enthronements.

== Origin ==
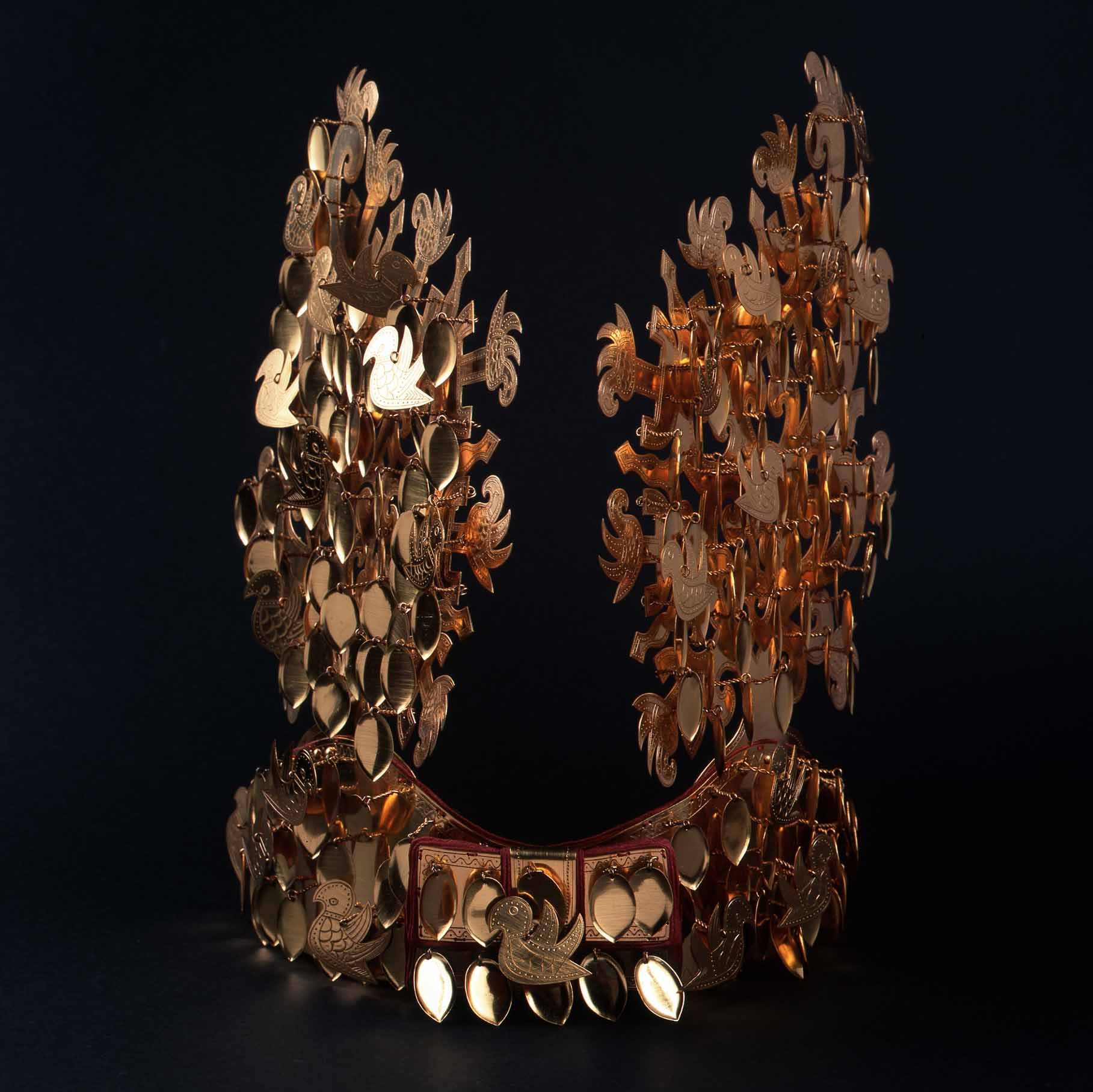
Gilt-bronze crown excavated from the Fujinoki tomb, late 6th century (reconstruction).

In ancient Japan, flowers, branches, and leaves were used as hair ornaments or were worn around the head. Such ornaments were called uzu (髻華) or kazura (鬘).

During the Kofun period (mid-3rd to 7th century), metal crowns and crown caps of gilt bronze appeared among the grave goods of elite burials. Examples have been excavated from tumuli such as the Eta Funayama and Fujinoki tombs. Some Kofun-period crowns are closely related to crown forms found on the Korean peninsula. For example, a gilt-bronze crown excavated from the Nihonmatsuyama Kofun is described as similar to headband-style crowns common in the Gaya region and as a likely Japanese-made imitation of that type. These Kofun-period crowns, however, were not yet the benkan of the historical imperial court.

In 603, Empress Suiko instituted the Twelve Level Cap and Rank System, which prescribed court caps according to official rank. The Book of Sui describes the Japanese ruler as having created a system of caps made of brocade or patterned cloth and decorated with openwork gold or silver floral ornaments. (Note: The original text is "至隋，其王始制冠，以錦綵為之，以金銀鏤花為飾。") The Nihon Shoki also records the use of uzu ornaments on court caps, with materials differing according to rank.

Another early reference to Japanese court headwear appears in the Old Book of Tang. It describes Awata no Mahito, a Japanese envoy who had an audience with Wu Zetian in 703, as wearing a crown resembling the Chinese 進徳冠 (jìndéguān), with a floral ornament at the top. (Note: The original text is "冠進德冠，其頂爲花.") This suggests that floral ornaments remained an important feature of Japanese court headwear in the early 8th century.

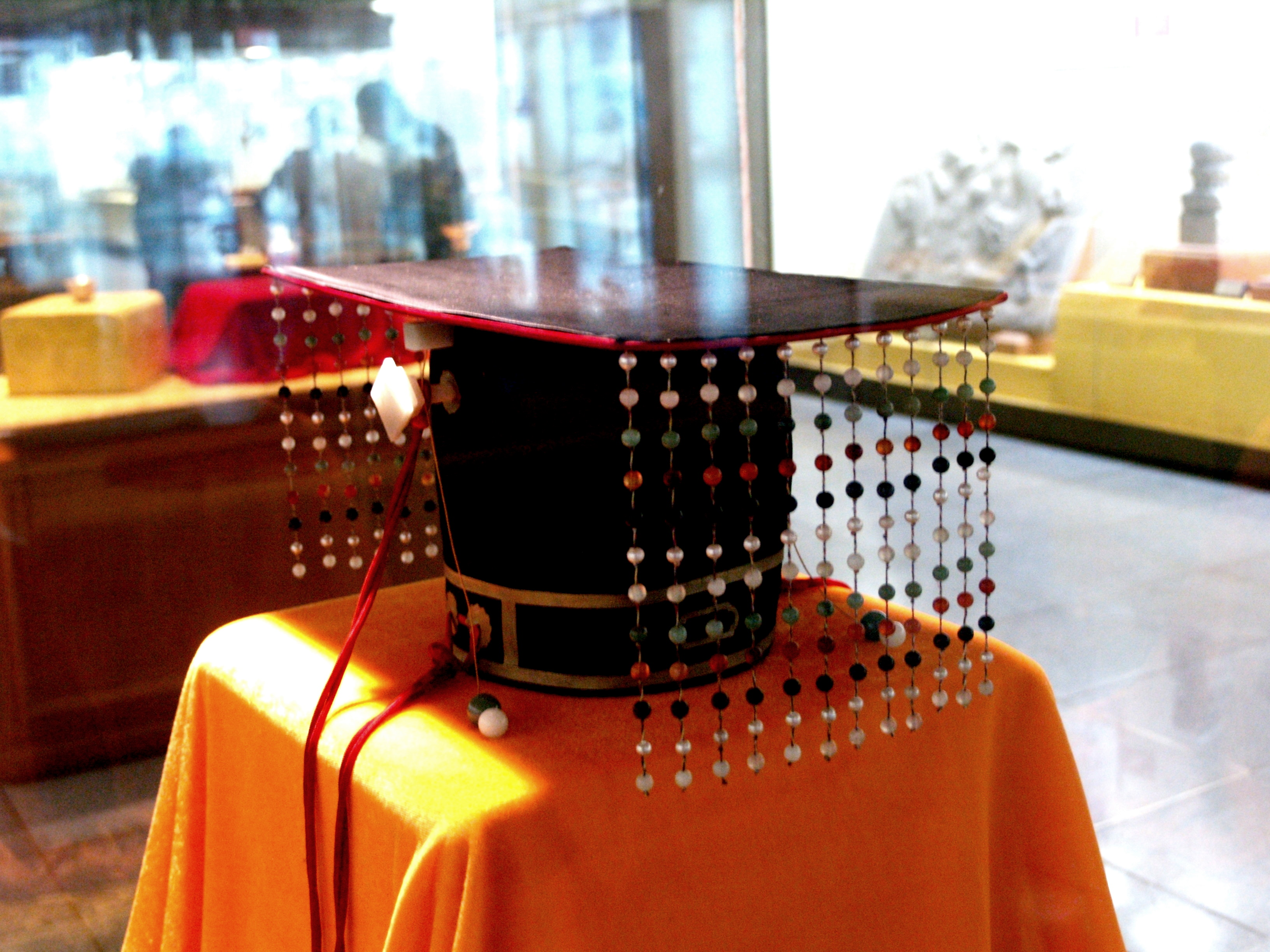
Mianguan of the Wanli Emperor of the Ming dynasty.

The first explicit record of imperial benpuku (冕服; ceremonial crown and robes) appears in the Shoku Nihongi. Under New Year's Day of Tenpyō 4 (732), it states that Emperor Shōmu received the court in the Daigokuden and “first wore the benpuku.” This passage is usually treated as the earliest clear record of the Japanese emperor wearing ceremonial crown-and-robe attire of the benpuku type, although it does not by itself describe the detailed form of the crown.

Fragments traditionally associated primarily with Emperor Shōmu's ceremonial crown survive among the Shōsōin treasures as Onkanmuri zanketsu (御冠残欠; remnants of the imperial crown). They no longer preserve the original form of the crown, and it has been suggested that they may include fragments from other imperial or court crowns as well. The surviving fragments include metal ornaments, pearls, coral, and glass or lapis lazuli beads, and one sun-shaped ornament is thought to have belonged to Emperor Shōmu's crown.

== Terminology ==
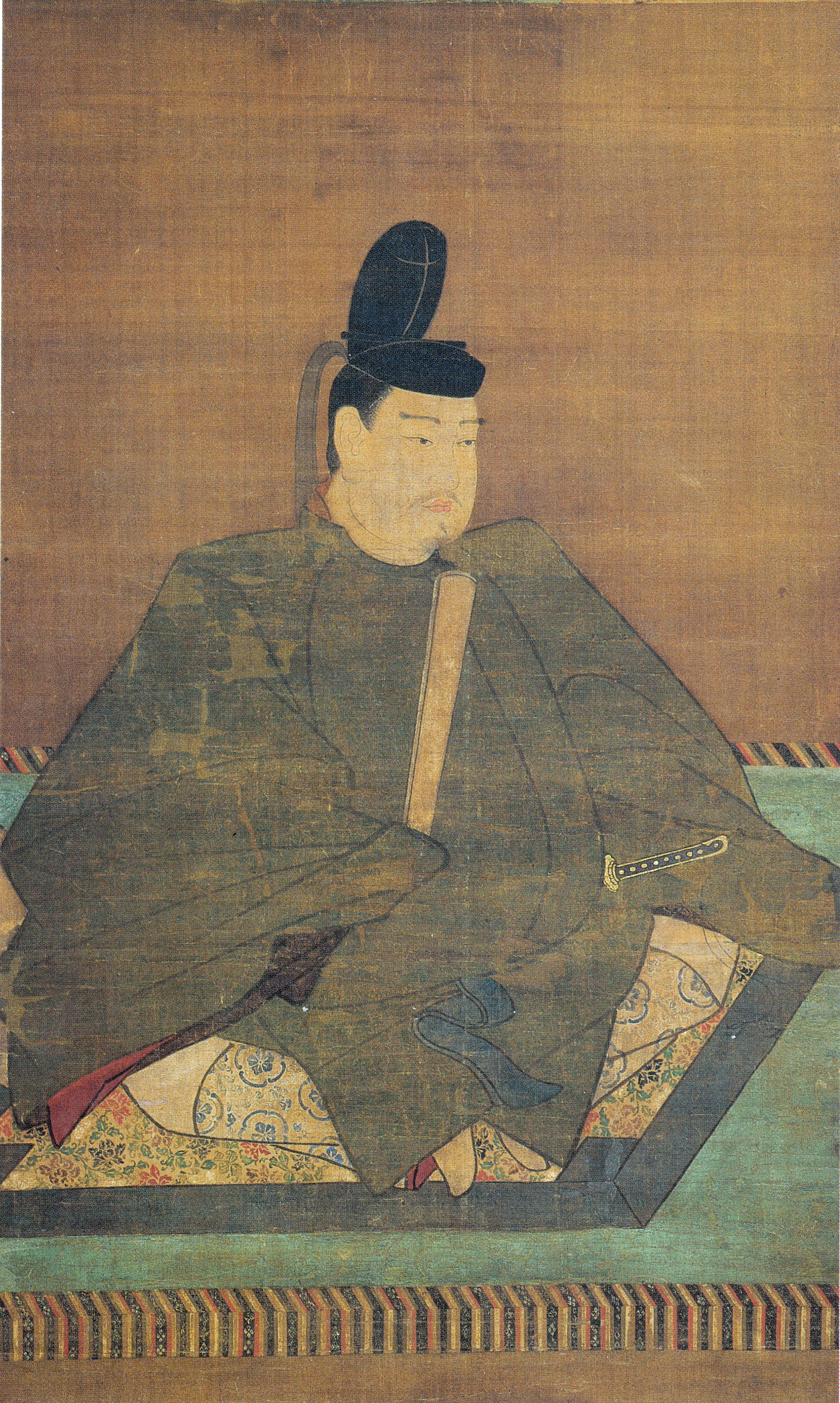
Portrait of Emperor Shōmu, 13th century. The crown depicted is a later suiei-kan (垂纓冠), not a Nara-period benkan.

The term benkan (冕冠) is composed of two characters associated with headgear. In classical Chinese, 冕 referred to a ritual crown worn by rulers and high-ranking officials; the Shuowen Jiezi defines it as “the crown of officials of the rank of dàifu or above.” 冠 is a more general term for a crown or cap. In Chinese usage, mianguan referred to a ritual crown used in court and ceremonial contexts. In Japan, however, benkan came to refer more specifically to the imperial ceremonial crown with a crown board and pendant jeweled ornaments, worn by the emperor and crown prince.

The Shoku Nihongi records that Emperor Shōmu first wore the benpuku (冕服; ceremonial crown and robes) in 732, but the text does not use the term benkan. A Shōsōin document dated 793, concerning the ceremonial crown associated with Emperor Shōmu, uses the term on-kanmuri (御冠) rather than benkan. The prefix on (御) is an honorific, while kanmuri (冠) is the Japanese reading of the same character 冠. Thus on-kanmuri means “the honorable crown” or “the imperial crown,” rather than a fixed technical term equivalent to benkan.

Later records also mention paintings of the ceremonial crowns of Emperor Shōmu and of Prince Yamabe, later Emperor Kanmu, when he was crown prince. These paintings were said to have been made in the Nara period and transmitted to the Kamakura period, but their titles used the term raikan (礼冠; ceremonial crown) rather than benkan. These examples suggest that terms such as on-kanmuri and raikan were used in early or later records for the imperial ceremonial crown, and that the term benkan may not have been the standard designation in the Nara period.

== Types ==
Minamoto no Takaakira's court ritual manual, the Saikyū-ki (10th century), distinguishes several types of imperial ceremonial crowns. It states that the emperor wore the benkan for enthronement and major court ceremonies, that a female emperor wore the hōkan (宝冠; precious crown), that a child emperor wore the nikkeikan (日形冠; sun-shaped crown), and that the crown prince wore the kyūshō benkan (九章冕冠; benkan with nine jeweled pendants).

The distinction between these crown types appears to have depended not only on the wearer, but also on the structure of the crown. The emperor's benkan and the crown prince's kyūshō benkan were characterized by pendant jeweled ornaments, called ryū (旒), hanging from the crown board. In Japanese descriptions, these pendants are also described as yōraku (瓔珞), jeweled ornaments made by linking metal fittings and jewels, rather than simple strings of beads. By contrast, the hōkan for a female emperor and the nikkeikan for a child emperor were treated as separate crown types, probably because they lacked the same benkan-style pendant ornaments.

== Structure and design ==
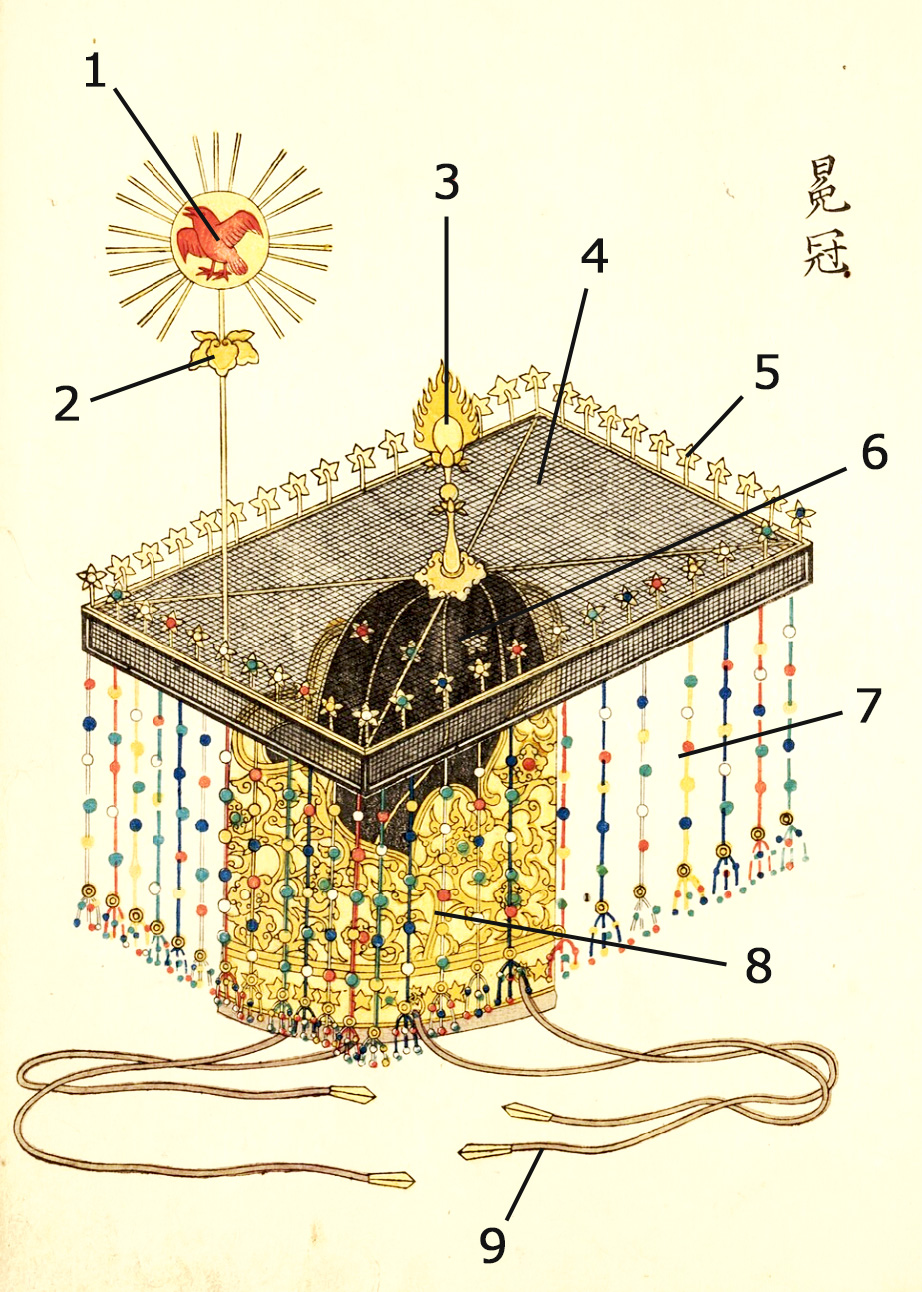
Structural diagram of a benkan

The following list describes the principal parts of the Edo-period benkan, especially the type represented by the crown of Emperor Kōmei. Earlier crowns, including the Shōsōin fragments associated with Emperor Shōmu, did not necessarily preserve the same form in every detail.

1. Sun-shaped ornament and three-legged crow (日形と三足烏): A sun-shaped ornament surrounded by rays of light. In later benkan, a three-legged crow was placed within the sun.
2. Zuiun (瑞雲, auspicious clouds): Cloud-shaped ornaments symbolizing good fortune.
3. Kaen hōju (火焔宝珠, flaming jewel): A flame-shaped ornament surrounding a crystal jewel.
4. Benban (冕板, crown board): A square or rectangular metal frame covered with thin black silk.
5. Tatetama (立玉, upright jewel ornament): A jeweled ornament set on an upright stem, often with petal-like fittings.
6. Koji (巾子): A black silk cap used to contain and support the topknot.
7. Ryū or yōraku (旒・瓔珞): Pendant jeweled ornaments hanging from the benban. In the Japanese benkan, these were not simple chains, but yōraku-style ornaments made by linking metal fittings and jewels.
8. Oshikazura (押鬘): An openwork metal outer crown with floral and arabesque designs. The term is thought to derive from kazura (鬘), an ancient word for plant-based hair ornaments.
9. Ei (纓): Cords or straps used to secure the crown.

== Emperor's crown ==
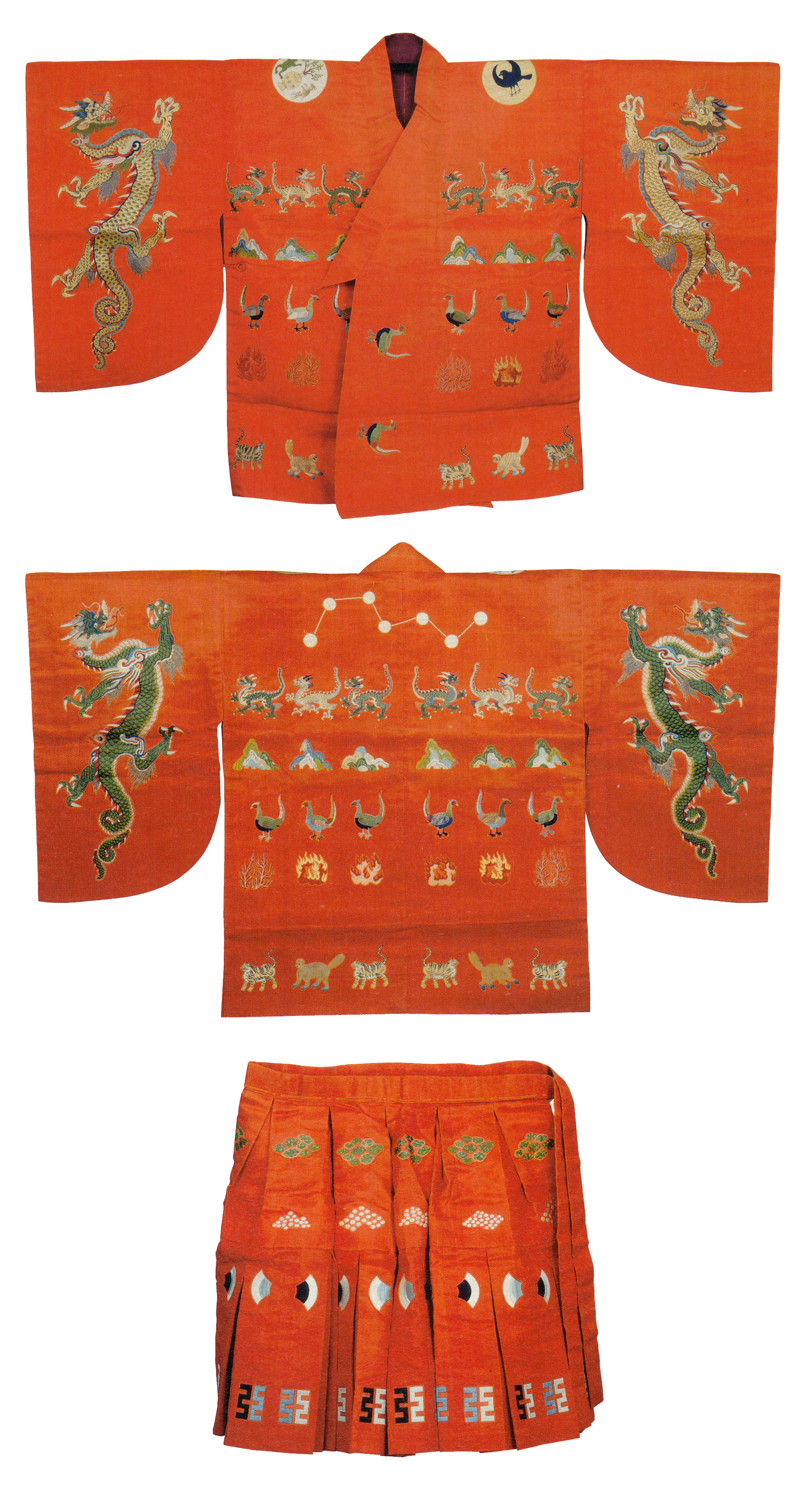
Emperor Kōmei's kon'e, 19th century.

In Japan, the emperor's benkan was worn together with the kon'e, the emperor's ceremonial robe, at enthronement and chōga (朝賀, New Year's court audience) ceremonies.

The Wamyō Ruijushō, a Chinese-Japanese dictionary compiled in the first half of the 10th century, glosses 冕 as tama no kōburi (玉乃冠; jeweled crown) in Japanese and explains it as a crown with ryū (旒) hanging from the front and back. This shows that, by the early Heian period, the defining feature of the 冕 was understood in Japan to be its pendant ornaments, rather than the shape of the cap alone.

Although the Japanese benkan ultimately derived from the Chinese mianguan, it developed a considerably different structure. The standard Chinese mianguan was basically composed of a cap and a crown board, and Chinese examples could include accessories such as earplug-like ornaments (黈纊) and jade hairpins (玉笄). These elements were not part of the Japanese benkan. Instead, the Japanese benkan developed a three-part structure consisting of an inner silk cap, an openwork metal outer crown, and a crown board.

The Edo-period emperor's benkan consisted of an inner black silk cap, an openwork gilt-bronze outer crown called oshikazura (押鬘), a crown board called benban (冕板), and forty-eight pendant jeweled ornaments, twelve on each side of the board. These pendants were not simple chains, but yōraku (瓔珞)-style ornaments made by linking metal fittings and jewels.

Another major feature of the Japanese benkan was the sun-shaped ornament mounted above the benban. A sun-shaped ornament is thought to have formed part of the Shōsōin fragments associated with Emperor Shōmu's ceremonial crown, although those fragments no longer preserve the original form of the crown. In later examples, the sun also contained a depiction of a three-legged crow, associated with the solar symbolism of the emperor.

The openwork metal outer crown, or oshikazura, was another feature not found in the standard Chinese mianguan. For this reason, the Japanese benkan has been interpreted not simply as an imitation of the Chinese crown, but as a form that combined the Chinese mianguan tradition with older Japanese traditions of metal crown ornaments.

A medieval tradition recorded in the Kojidan (1212–1215) states that the crown used at the Daijōsai was the crown of Emperor Ōjin. Later scholars, however, disagreed over whether this object should be identified as a benkan. Dohi Tsunehira (1707–1782), a scholar of court ritual, argued that it was not a benkan but a tamakazura (玉鬘), an ancient jeweled ornament.

=== Nara period ===
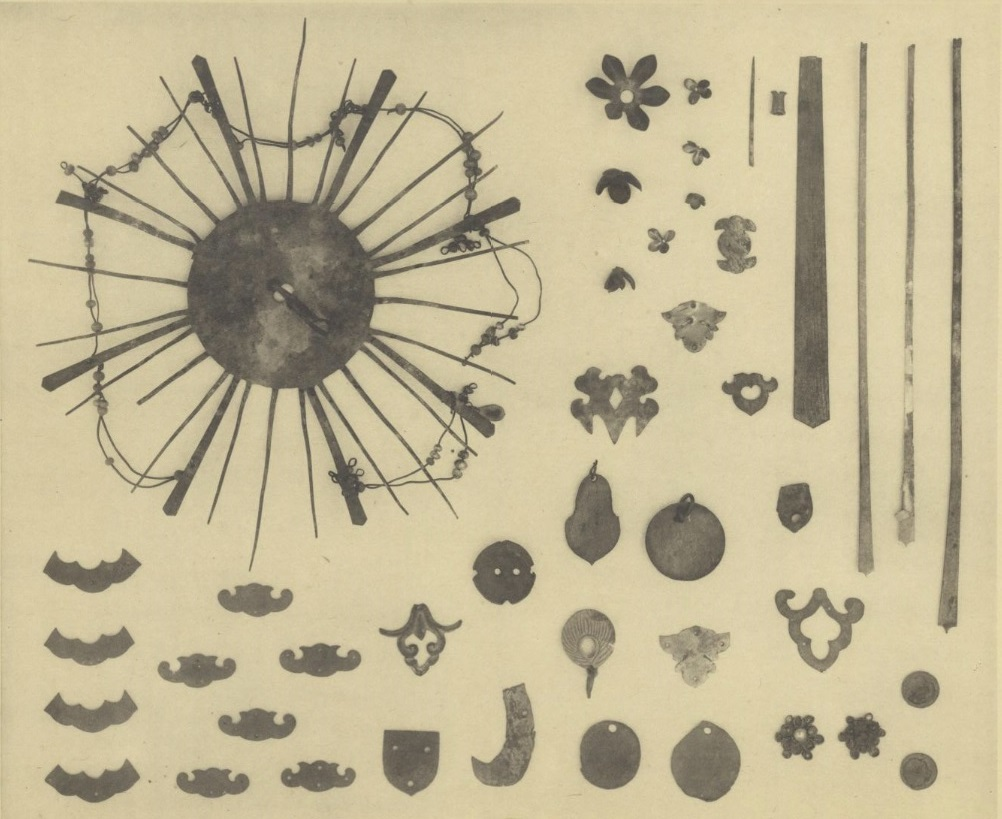
Fragments known as Onkanmuri zanketsu. A sun-shaped ornament can be seen in the upper left of the photograph.

Among the Shōsōin treasures are fragments known as Onkanmuri zanketsu (御冠残欠; remnants of the imperial crown), or more formally Raifuku onkanmuri zanketsu (礼服御冠残欠; remnants of ceremonial dress and imperial crowns). These fragments are traditionally associated with the ceremonial crowns of Emperor Shōmu, Empress Kōmyō, Empress Kōken, and court nobles, but they no longer preserve the original forms of the crowns.

The surviving pieces include metal ornaments with phoenix, cloud, floral, and arabesque designs, together with pearls, coral, and glass or lapis lazuli beads. A sun-shaped ornament among the fragments is thought to have belonged to Emperor Shōmu's ceremonial crown, although the identification of individual pieces remains uncertain.

Other records also suggest that more than one imperial crown was kept in the Shōsōin. Documents from 793 and 811 record a ceremonial crown with pendant ornaments and another crown described as a bonkan (凡冠; ordinary crown). Later records associate these crowns with an unnamed emperor, but the relevant characters are no longer legible, and their precise attribution remains uncertain. They may have belonged to one of the emperors who reigned after Emperor Shōmu and before the late 8th century, such as Empress Kōken, Emperor Junnin, or Emperor Kōnin, but no identification can be made with certainty.

In 1242, during preparations for the enthronement of Emperor Go-Saga, crowns and ceremonial headdresses kept in the Shōsōin were removed from the repository to serve as models for newly made ceremonial crowns. When the treasures were returned, some of the imperial crowns were damaged so badly that they no longer preserved their original forms. For this reason, the fragments associated with Emperor Shōmu's crown may have become mixed with pieces from other imperial or court crowns.

=== Heian period ===
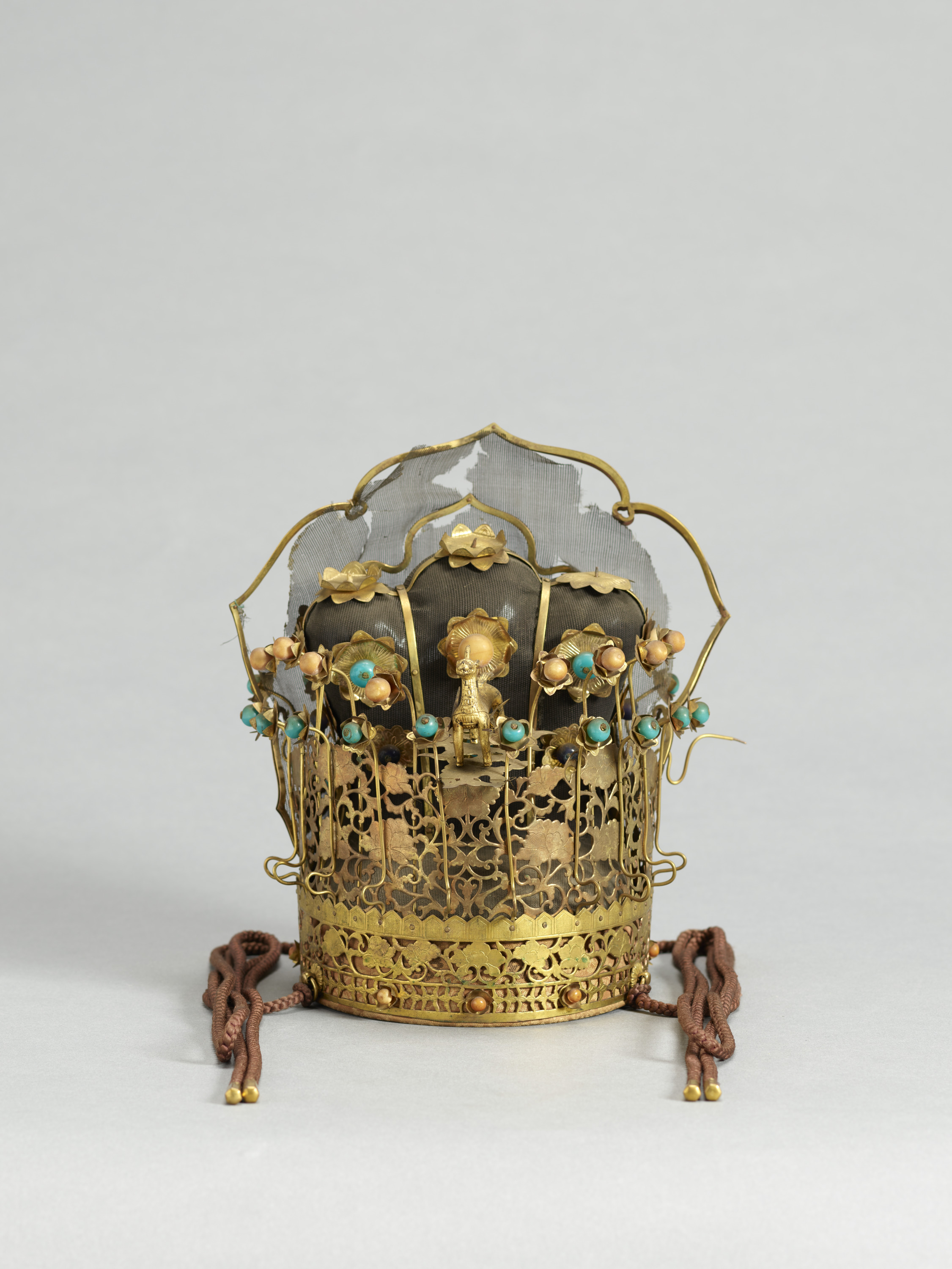
Raikan worn by vassals, 18th century, with kushigata at the rear.

A later record states that a jeweled crown was newly made for Emperor Seiwa in 864. This crown is generally identified with the imperial benkan later kept in the imperial treasury and used at subsequent enthronement and court ceremonies.

The principal evidence for the form of the Heian-period emperor's benkan is a description in Minamoto no Morofusa's diary, the Doyūki (土右記). In the entry for July 4, Chōgen 9 (1036), Morofusa records a viewing of imperial ceremonial dress and describes a crown generally identified with the emperor's benkan.

According to this description, the crown had an inner black silk cap called koji (巾子). kushigata (櫛形) ornaments were placed at the front and back. Modern scholars have interpreted these as gold-framed ornaments covered with thin silk, but the exact meaning of kushigata is debated. The term has been interpreted variously as a petal-shaped ornament behind the crown, a metal rim below the oshikazura, or an earlier term referring to a part corresponding to the koji. Since these interpretations depend on later terminology and comparative examples, the kushigata mentioned in the Doyūki may not have been identical in form to the kushigata of later court crowns. The raikan worn by court nobles normally had a kushigata at the rear, whereas the emperor's benkan also had one at the front.

Around the inner cap was an openwork metal outer crown called oshikazura (押鬘). Above the koji was a square crown board made of a gold frame and thin silk. From the front and back edges of this board hung twelve pendant jeweled ornaments on each edge, described in the source as tama-yōraku (玉瓔珞). Upright jeweled stems were arranged along the four sides of the board. At the top of the crown was a sun-shaped ornament, made from two pieces of crystal, within which was a red three-legged crow. Rays of light surrounded the sun.

The Heian-period form described in the Doyūki and the Edo-period benkan of Emperor Kōmei shared the same basic structure, but there were notable differences. The kushigata described in the Doyūki is absent from Emperor Kōmei's benkan. The Doyūki clearly describes pendant ornaments hanging from the front and back of the crown board, but it does not clearly state that such ornaments also hung from the left and right sides. In Emperor Kōmei's benkan, by contrast, pendant ornaments hang from all four sides of the board. In addition, the sun ornament in the Doyūki is described as being made of crystal, while in Emperor Kōmei's benkan the three-legged crow is carved on the sun-shaped plate.

=== Kamakura period ===
A benkan traditionally identified with Emperor Seiwa's crown was used in the enthronement ceremonies of later emperors. However, during preparations for the enthronement ceremony of Emperor Go-Saga (reigned 1242–1246), it was found to be too badly damaged for use. As a result, ceremonial crowns and court headdresses kept in the Shōsōin Repository were removed from storage to serve as models for making a new benkan for Emperor Go-Saga. These included crowns associated with Emperor Shōmu, Empress Kōken, and Empress Kōmyō, as well as ceremonial crowns of court nobles.

An image of a ceremonial crown associated with Emperor Shōmu had also been preserved in the imperial palace. According to Emperor Go-Fukakusa (reigned 1246–1260), who saw this image, there was no particular difference between the crown depicted there and the newly made benkan of Emperor Go-Saga. This account suggests that the medieval benkan was understood to follow substantially the same form as the earlier imperial ceremonial crown, although the exact form of the Nara-period crown cannot be reconstructed with certainty.

=== Muromachi period ===
The painting Silken Painting of Emperor Go-Daigo depicts Emperor Go-Daigo wearing a crown traditionally identified as the crown of Emperor Jimmu. This tradition, however, conflicts with the usual historical understanding that the first explicit record of imperial benpuku (冕服; ceremonial crown and robes) appears in the Shoku Nihongi under Emperor Shōmu in 732.

The portrait shows Emperor Go-Daigo undergoing a Shingon Buddhist Abhisheka (灌頂, kanjō) ceremony in 1330, and is said to have been completed on October 23, 1339, after his death. Scholars have differed over whether the work was begun during Emperor Go-Daigo's lifetime or only after his death.

The crown depicted in the portrait consists of a benban board placed above an ordinary kanmuri, with a sun-shaped ornament mounted above the board. Pendant ornaments are also shown hanging from the ends of the board. The kushigata and oshikazura are not depicted, and the form does not correspond exactly to the characteristics of the benkan described in the Doyūki.

One interpretation is that this form of a benkan placed above a kanmuri was a non-realistic pictorial expression. Another view is that the form was an intentionally unrealistic or impossible mode of wearing the crown, modeled partly on images of Prince Shōtoku, in order to present Emperor Go-Daigo as a sanctified ruler.

On the other hand, Kondō has noted a possible comparison with Chinese ceremonial practice. According to the Book of Jin, the Jin dynasty (266–420) had a removable form of mianguan called 平冕 (píngmiǎn), which could be placed above the tongtianguan. In Japan, a crown associated with Empress Kōken in the Shōsōin Repository has also been interpreted as possibly having been of a removable type.

According to the diary of Nijō Michihira, when the imperial treasury was destroyed by fire in 1333, imperial garments and treasures said to have belonged to Emperor Jimmu were also destroyed. Sakaguchi Taro argues that the benkan was probably among these treasures. Thus, regardless of whether the attribution to Emperor Jimmu was historically accurate, it is possible that Emperor Go-Daigo wore a crown that was regarded at the time as Emperor Jimmu's benkan.

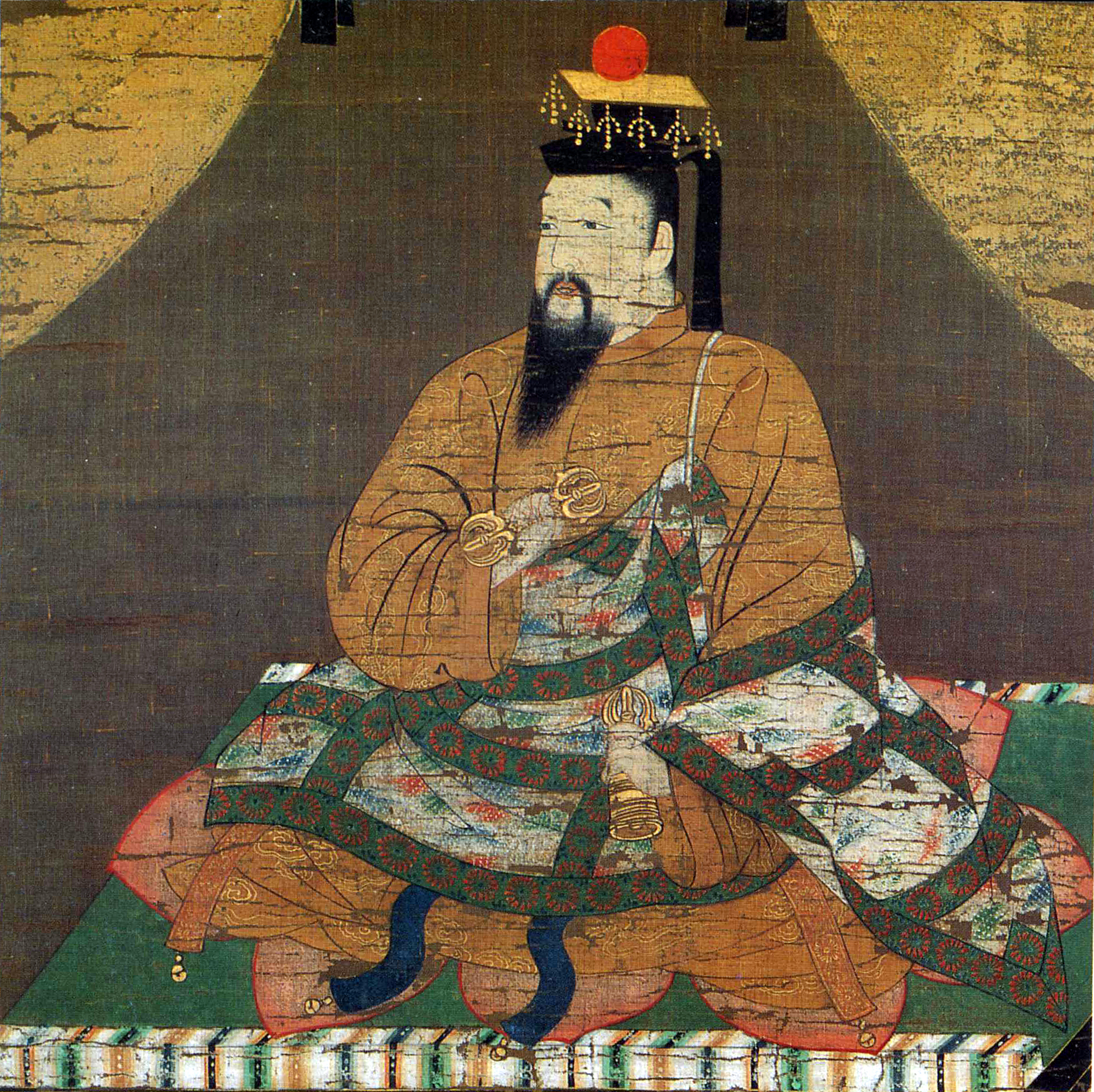
Emperor Go-Daigo depicted wearing a benkan-like crown.

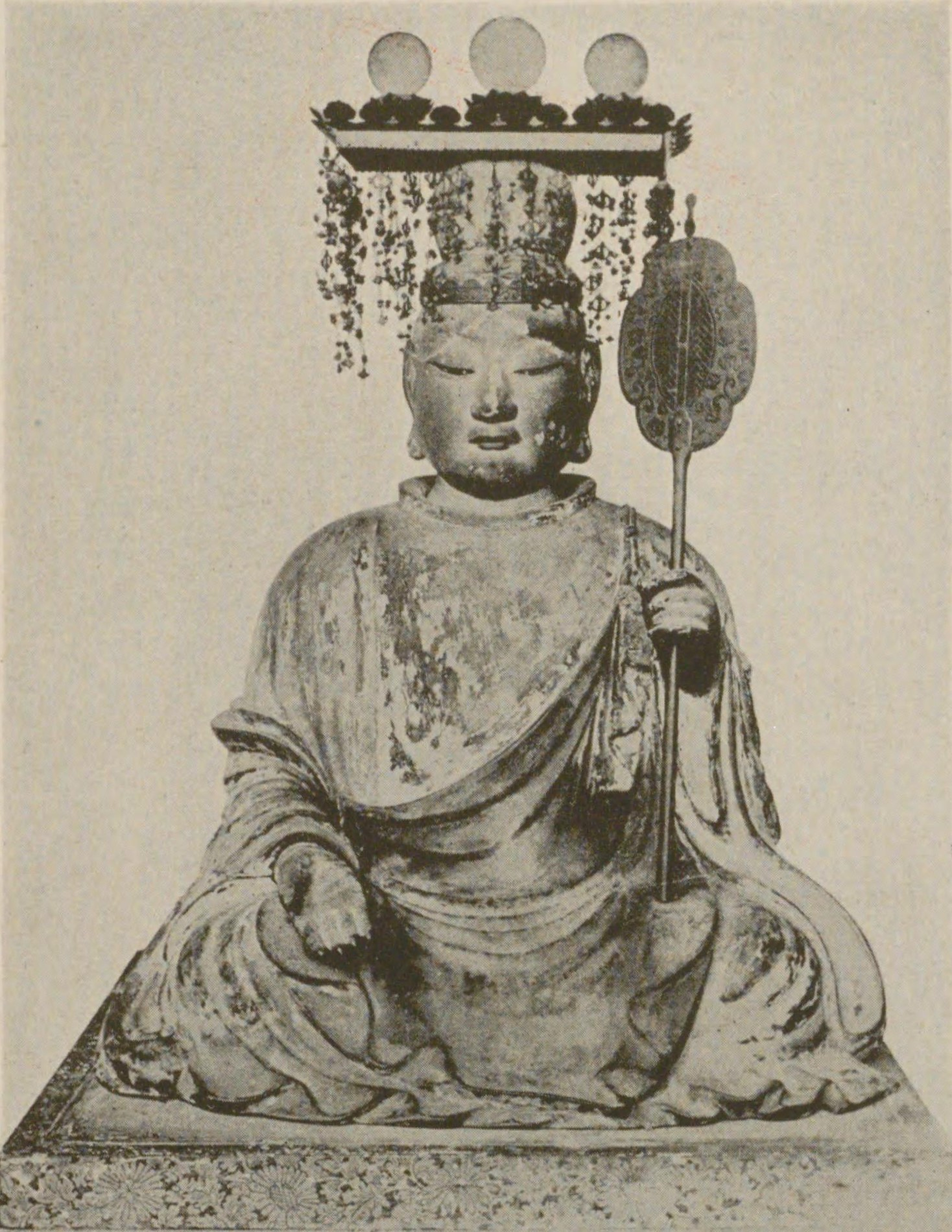
Statue of Prince Shōtoku

=== Edo period ===
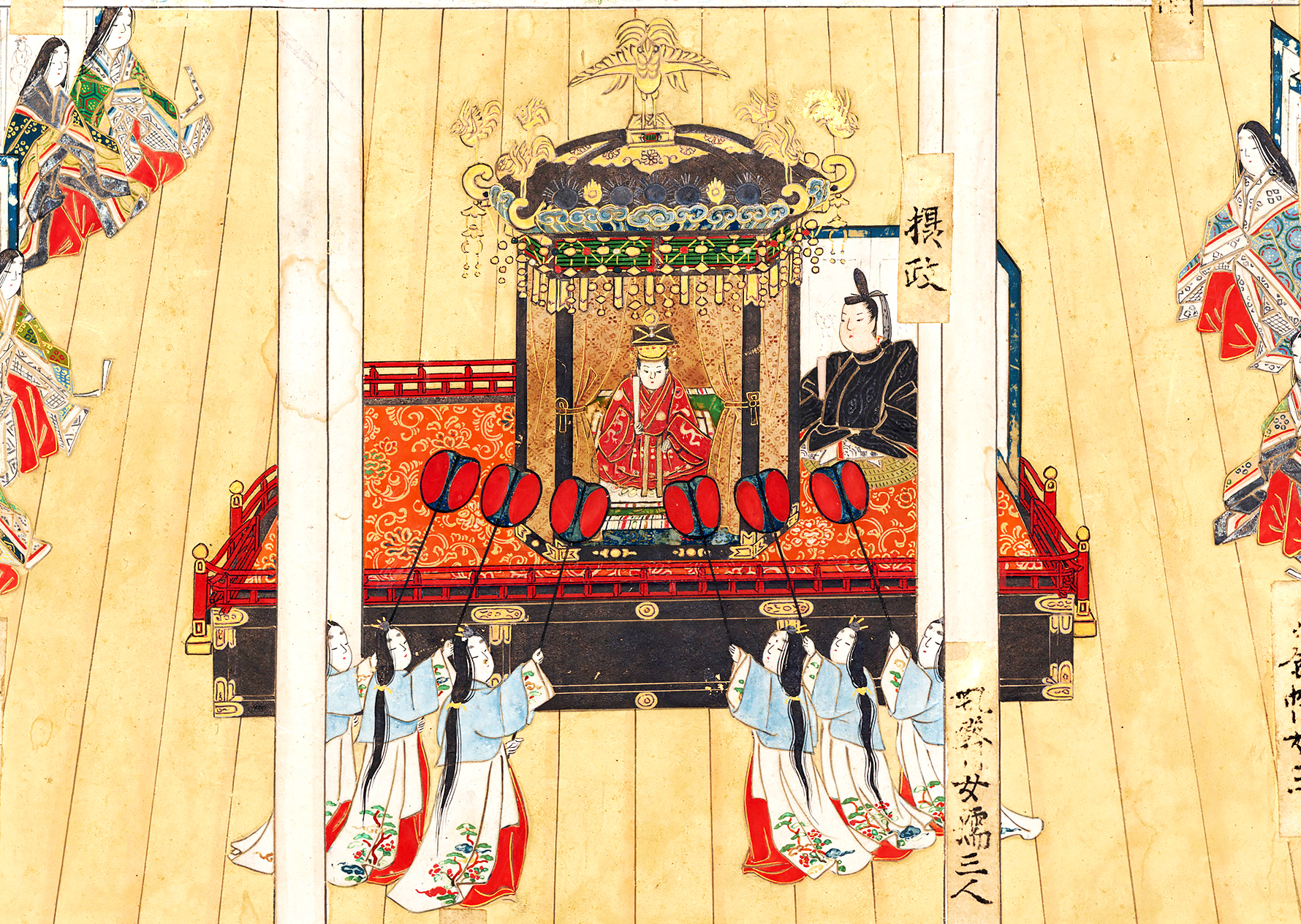
Emperor Reigen wearing the benkan.

The medieval benkan is thought to have been destroyed in the fire at the Kyoto Imperial Palace in 1653, after which a new benkan was made. In the 17th-century folding screen painting "Enthronement of Emperor Reigen and Abdication of Emperor Go-Sai", Emperor Reigen (reigned 1663–1687) is depicted seated in the takamikura throne, wearing a benkan and a red kon'e.

When Empress Go-Sakuramachi (reigned 1762–1771) ascended the throne, she was the first female emperor since Empress Meishō (reigned 1629–1643). Since the earlier hōkan used for a female emperor was no longer extant, a new crown was made on the basis of a crown associated with Tokugawa Masako (1607–1678), the empress consort of Emperor Go-Mizunoo, with the addition of a sun-shaped ornament.

The benkan worn by Emperor Ninkō and the benkan worn by Emperor Kōmei at their enthronement ceremonies are preserved in the Higashiyama Gobunko, the imperial archive at the Kyoto Imperial Palace.

The benkan continued to be used through the enthronement ceremony of Emperor Kōmei. From the enthronement of Emperor Meiji onward, it was replaced by the go-ryūei no kanmuri (御立纓の冠), as the Meiji government revised the enthronement ceremony and moved away from Chinese-style elements in favor of Shinto forms.

== Female emperor's crown (hōkan) ==
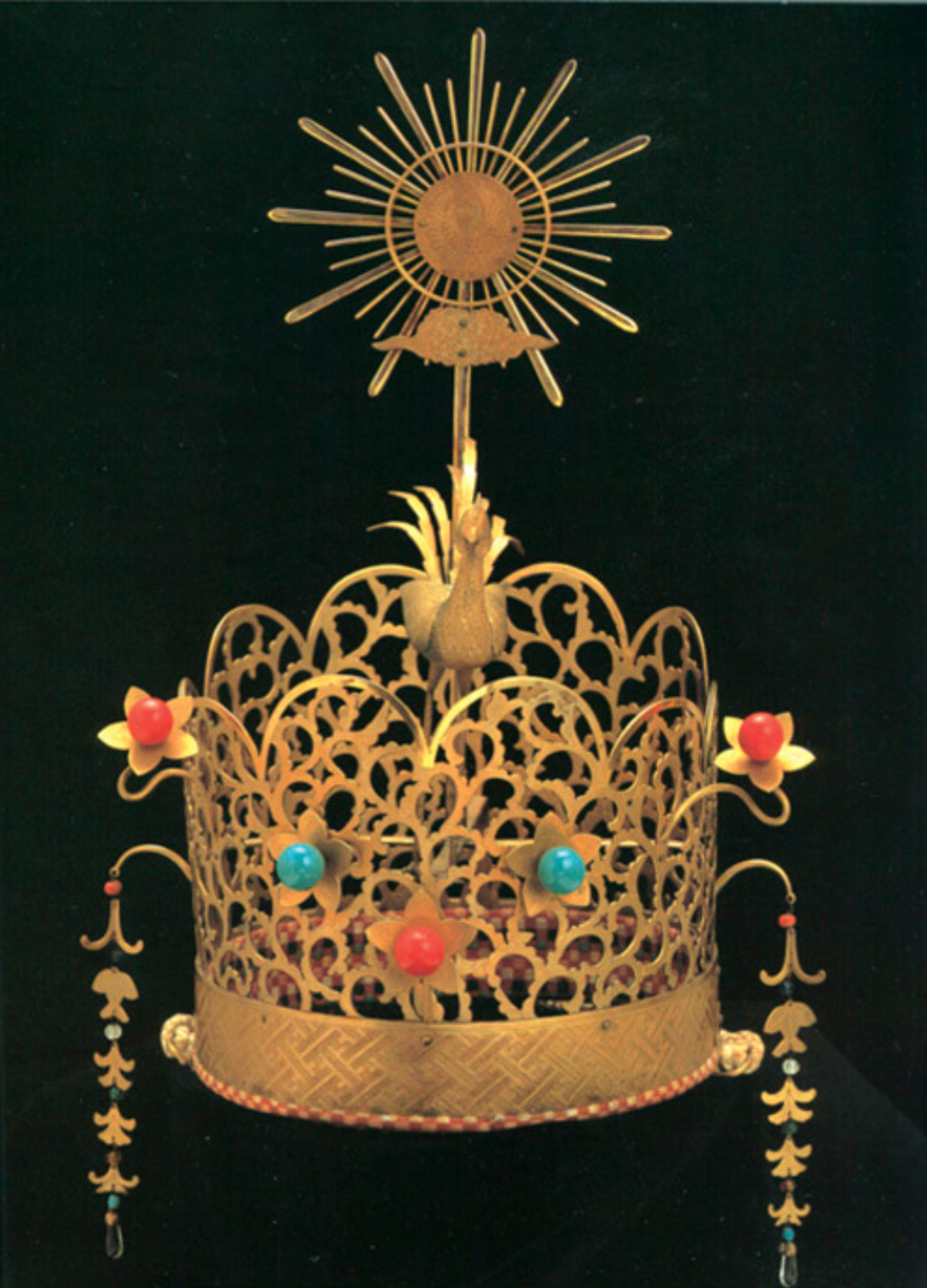
Empress Go-Sakuramachi's hōkan

A crown used by a female emperor was called a hōkan (宝冠; precious crown). The Doyūki records a viewing in 1036 of a hōkan kept in the imperial treasury.

According to the description, the hōkan had a low koji (巾子), an oshikazura (押鬘) or openwork gold outer crown, and three branches extending from it, each with a floral ornament at its tip. Unlike the emperor's benkan, it had no kushigata (櫛形). A small phoenix ornament was placed on the top of the crown, slightly to the left, suggesting that a corresponding phoenix on the right may have been lost.

The low form of the koji has been interpreted as reflecting the fact that women did not wear the same high topknot as male emperors. The crown also lacked the benkan-style pendant jeweled ornaments, which may explain why it was classified as a hōkan rather than as a benkan.

The hōkan described in the Doyūki has been associated with Empress Kōken, but some scholars have questioned whether it was instead intended for an empress consort, that is, the wife of an emperor, rather than for a reigning female emperor.

The hōkan used for Empress Meishō was later lost in a fire during the Edo period. Empress Go-Sakuramachi's hōkan, made in the eighteenth century, survives in the Higashiyama Gobunko at the Kyoto Imperial Palace.

Empress Go-Sakuramachi's hōkan has neither a benban nor benkan-style pendant ornaments hanging from a crown board. Instead, three pendant ornaments hang from the phoenix's beak and from the left and right sides of the crown. Compared with the hōkan described in the Doyūki, it lacks the koji itself and has a sun-shaped ornament similar to that of the benkan.

The Order of the Precious Crown, established in 1888, takes its name and central motif from the hōkan. The center of the insignia is decorated with the image of a precious crown.

== Nikkeikan (child emperor's crown) ==
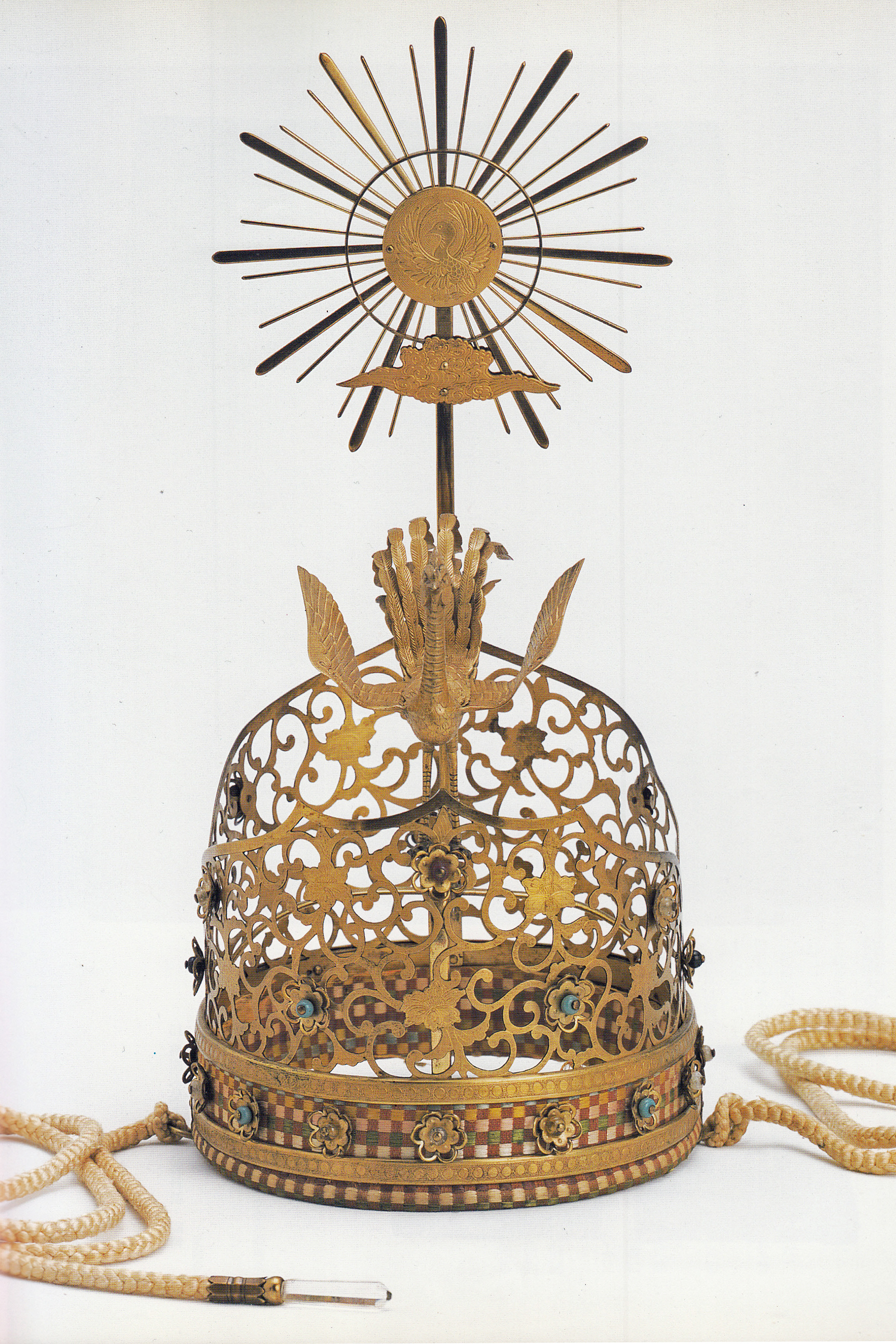
Emperor Nakamikado's nikkeikan, 1710.

The crown used by a child emperor was called nikkeikan (日形冠; lit. 'sun-shaped crown'), and was distinguished from the benkan. The Saikyū-ki states that a child emperor wore a nikkeikan.

The Doyūki describes the characteristics of a nikkeikan for a child emperor. According to this description, its lower structure was similar to that of the benkan, but because a child emperor did not yet wear a topknot, it did not have a koji (巾子). The top of the crown was decorated with a sun-shaped ornament. Its metal outer crown was decorated with gold and precious stones, and it lacked the benkan-style pendant ornaments. A phoenix with outspread wings stood at the front of the crown.

The nikkeikan used by Emperor Nakamikado (reigned 1709–1735) and that used by Emperor Kōkaku (reigned 1779–1817) at their respective enthronement ceremonies are preserved in the Higashiyama Gobunko at the Kyoto Imperial Palace. Their form is similar to that of the hōkan, with a phoenix and a sun-shaped ornament at the top.

== Crown prince's benkan ==
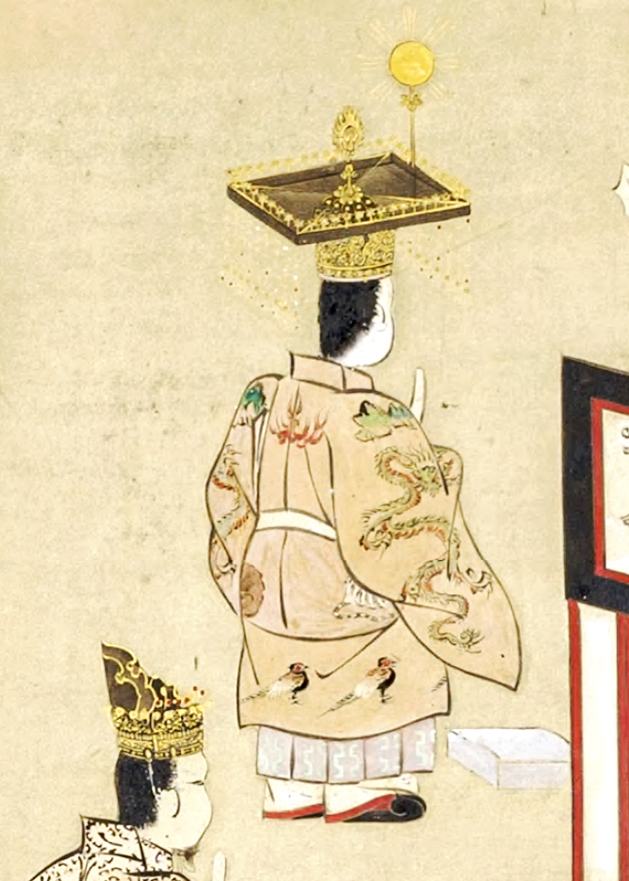
The Japanese crown prince wearing the kyūshō benkan and ceremonial robes. From the Chōga-zu (1855).

In the Saikyū-ki, the crown prince's benkan is described as kyūshō benkan (九章冕冠). The term kyūshō (九章) is understood as corresponding to kyūryū (九旒), or nine pendant jeweled ornaments. The crown prince's benkan was therefore distinguished from the emperor's benkan, which was associated with twelve such pendant ornaments.

A later record states that a painting of a crown worn by a crown prince had been preserved in the imperial palace. This painting was said to depict the raikan (礼冠; ceremonial crown) of Prince Yamabe, later Emperor Kanmu, who became crown prince in 773. The crown depicted in the painting was described as generally similar to the emperor's benkan, but not identical. One difference was the number of pendant ornaments, which was understood to be nine rather than twelve.

== Gallery ==
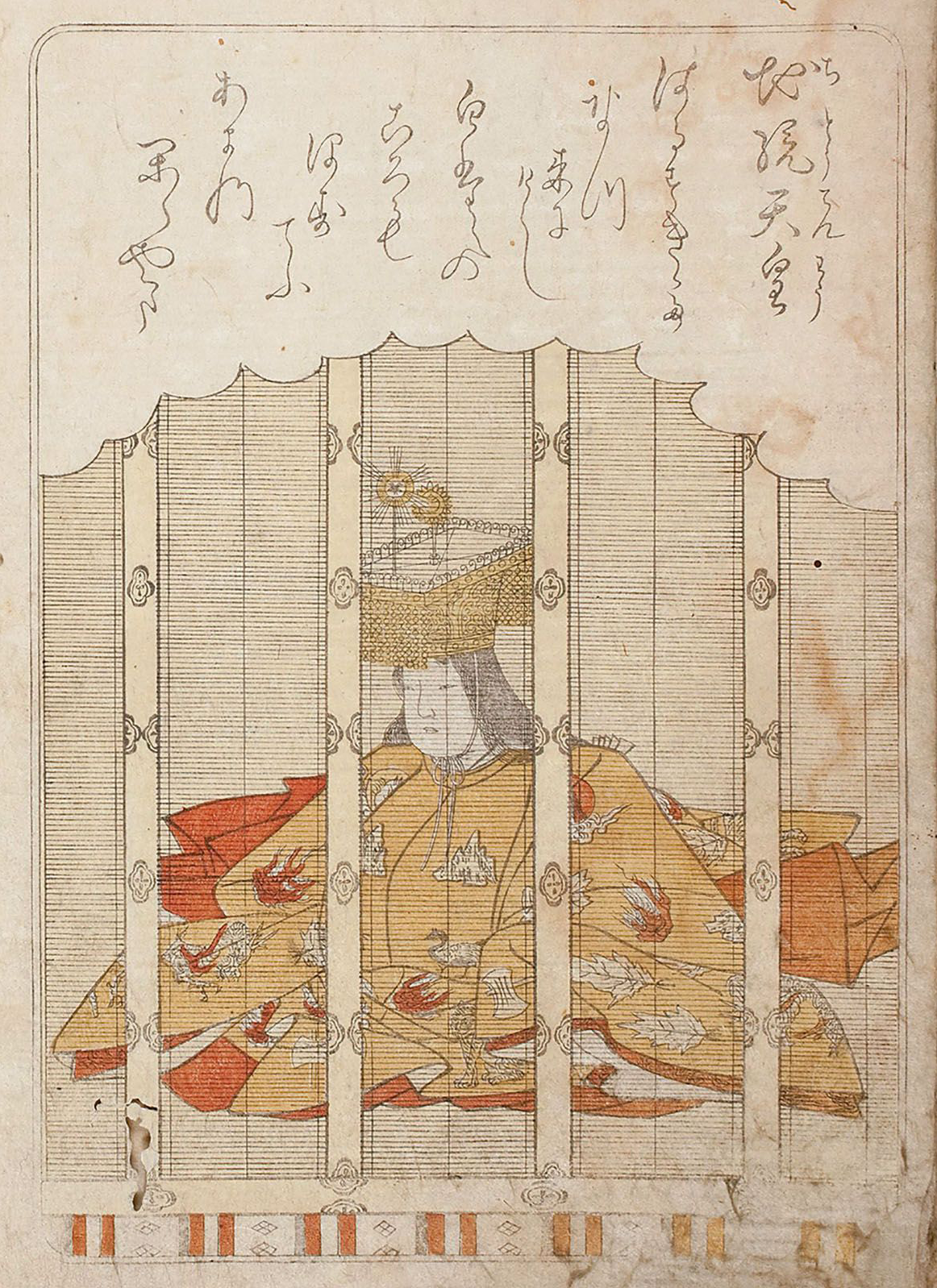
Empress Jitō wearing the benkan, Edo period, by Katsukawa Shunshō.

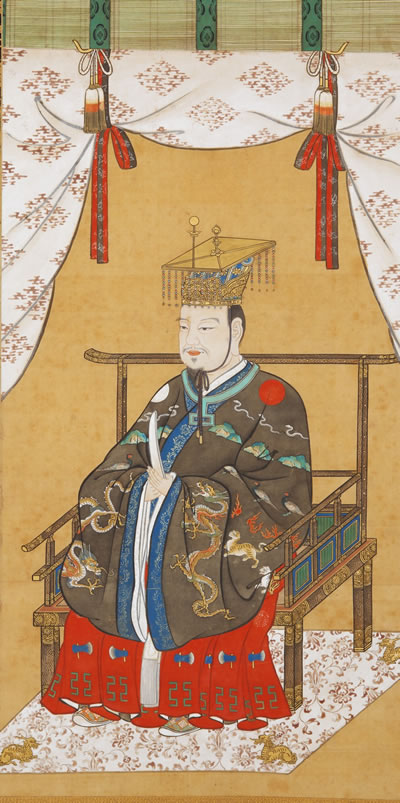
Portrait of Emperor Kanmu wearing the benkan, 1805, Enryaku-ji collection.

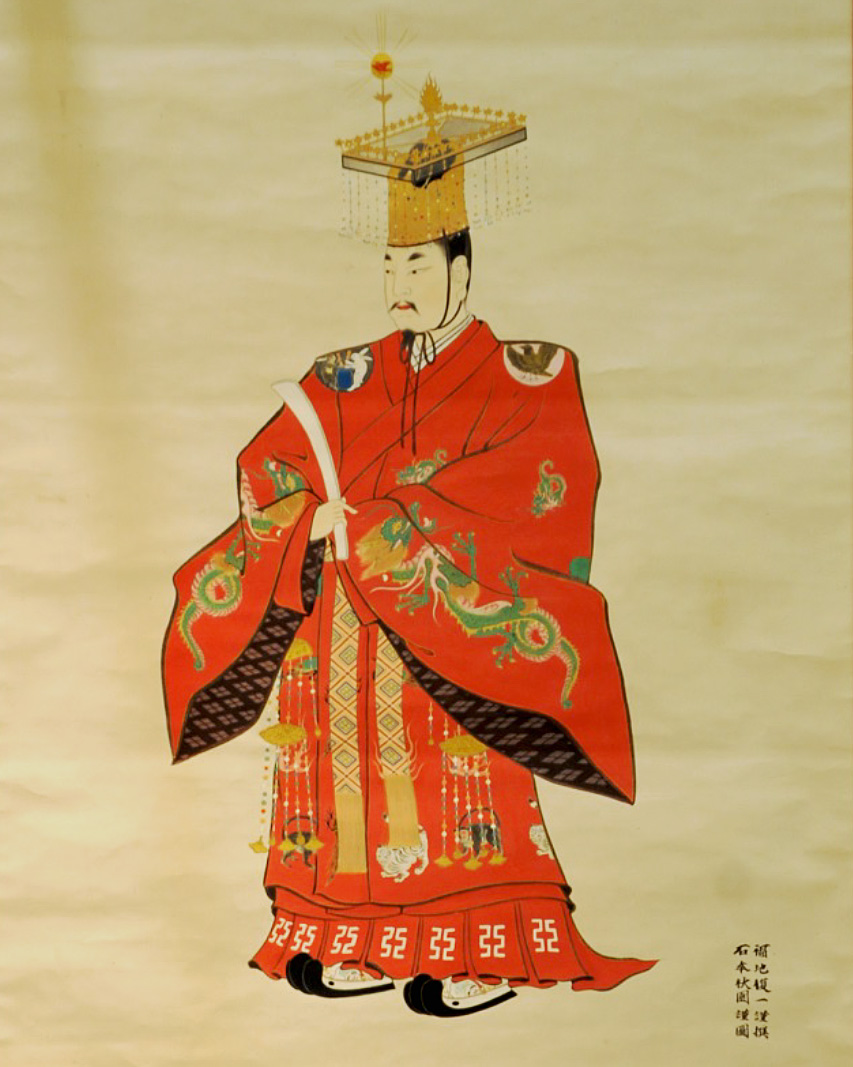
Portrait of Emperor Go-Sanjō, 1893, Komaba Museum collection.

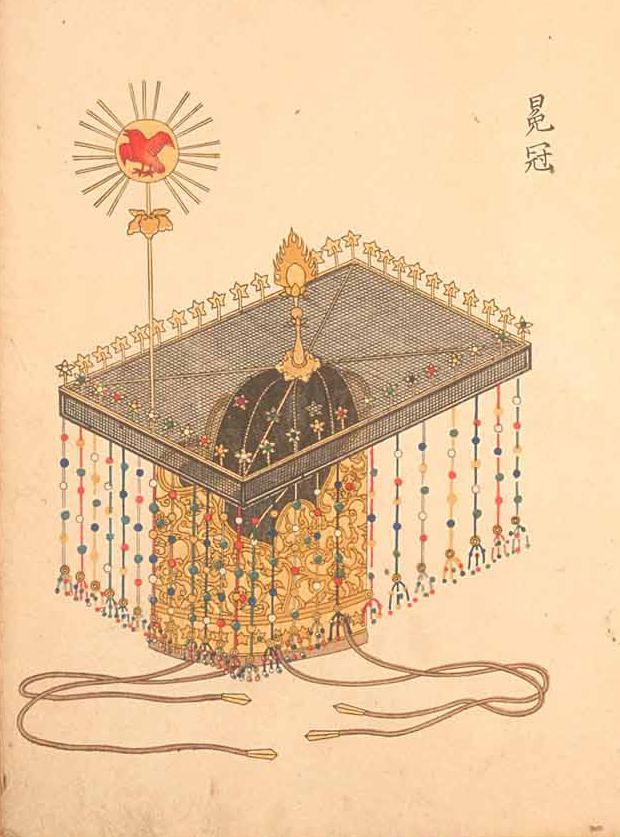
View of a benkan.

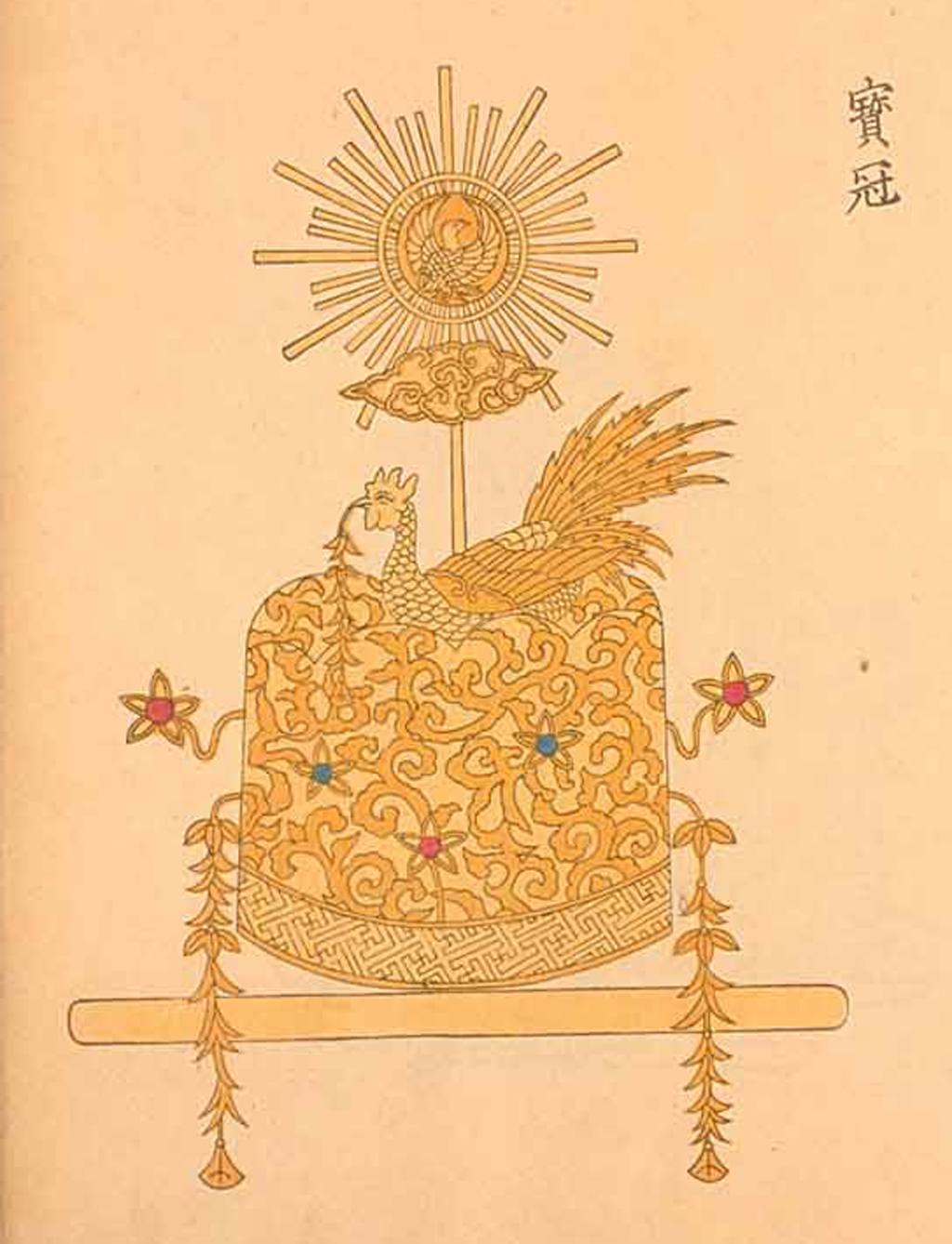
Hōkan

== See also ==
- Imperial crown
- Kon'e
- Raikan

== General and cited reference ==
- Abe, Yasuro (2013). 中世日本の宗教テクスト体系 [Medieval Japanese Religious Textual Systems] (in Japanese). Nagoya University Press. ISBN 978-4-8158-0723-8.
- Kondo, Yoshikazu (2019-03-16). 天皇の装束 - 即位式、日常生活、退位後 [The Emperor's Attire—Accession Ceremony, Daily Life, After the Abdication] (in Japanese). Chuokoronsha. ISBN 978-4-12-102536-4.
- Kuroda, Hideo (1993). 王の身体 王の肖像 [King's Body Portrait of a King]. Image Reading Series (in Japanese). Heibonsha. ISBN 978-4-582-28470-6.
- Matsudaira, Norimasa (2006). 図説宮中柳営の秘宝 [Illustrated: Treasures of the Imperial Family and the Shoguns] (in Japanese). Kawade Shobō Shinsha. ISBN 978-4-309-76081-0.
- Takeda, Sachiko; Tsuda, Daisuke (2016-08-20). 礼服―天皇即位儀礼や元旦の儀の花の装い― [Ceremonial Dress: Floral attire for the emperor's accession ceremony and New Year's Day ceremony] (in Japanese). Osaka University Press. ISBN 978-4-87259-551-2.
- Toyama, Motohiro (2014). "清浄光寺蔵「後醍醐天皇像」関連史料の一考察" [A Study of Historical Materials Related to the "Go-Daigo Emperor Statue" in Seikouji Temple]. Komazawa Women's University Research (in Japanese). 21 (21). Komazawa Women's University: 27–44. doi:10.18998/00001184.
- Uchida, Kei'ichi (2006). 文観房弘真と美術 [Monkanbō Kōshin and Art] (in Japanese). Hōzōkan. ISBN 978-4-8318-7639-3.
