= Benkan of Emperor Kōmei =

Crown of Emperor Kōmei of Japan

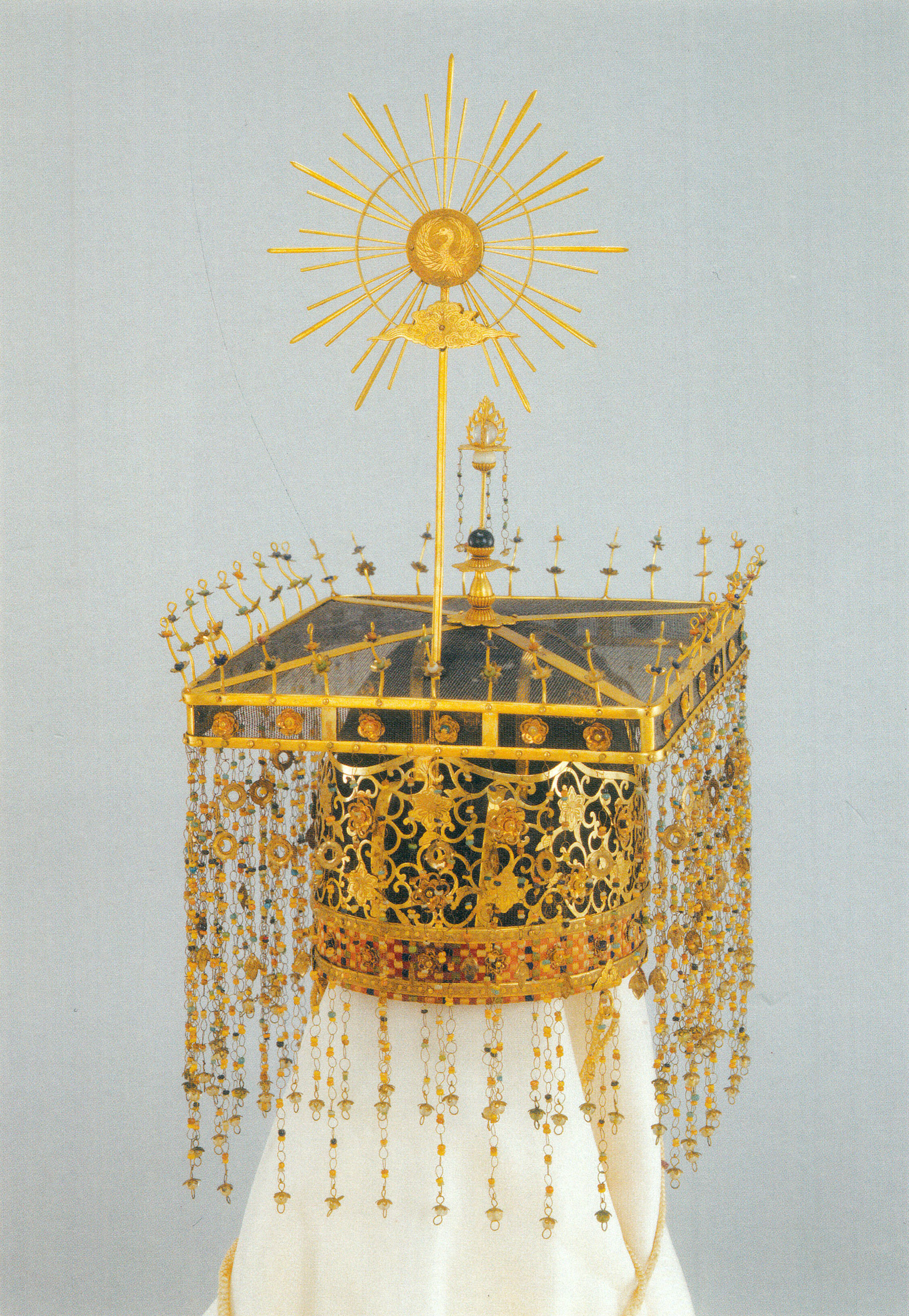

Details
- Country: Japan
- Made: 1771; repaired for use in 1847
- Owner: Imperial House of Japan
- Material: Gilt copper, thin silk (ra), brocade, crystal, and glass
- Cap: Silk

The Benkan of Emperor Kōmei (孝明天皇の冕冠) is an imperial crown in the benkan style worn by Emperor Kōmei (reigned 1846–1867) of Japan.

From at least the 8th century, the benkan, derived in part from the Chinese mianguan, was used in the enthronement ceremonies of Japanese emperors. Emperor Kōmei was the last emperor to wear the benkan at an enthronement ceremony. From the enthronement of Emperor Meiji (reigned 1867–1912) onward, the court crown known as the ryūei no kanmuri (立纓冠; lit. 'crown with upright tail ornament') replaced the benkan in the enthronement ceremony.

The benkan of Emperor Kōmei is preserved as an imperial treasure (御物, gyobutsu) of the Imperial Household. Although it is not normally open to the public, it was displayed in 2020 in an exhibition commemorating the accession of Emperor Naruhito.

== History ==
The benkan was worn by Japanese emperors together with the kon'e (袞衣), the emperor's ceremonial robe, at the enthronement ceremony. The kon'e was embroidered with the twelve ornaments reserved for the emperor, and the complete ensemble of crown and robe was called konben jūnishō (袞冕十二章, twelve ornaments of crown and robe).

The Imperial Costume Catalogue, compiled in 1912 during a survey of costumes stored in the Kyoto Imperial Palace, lists this benkan as an object associated with Emperor Kōmei. It was therefore formerly thought to have been newly made for Emperor Kōmei's enthronement ceremony.

However, the Tokinari-kyō ki, the diary of the courtier Yamashina Tokinari (山科言成), states that an old crown was repaired and used for Emperor Kōmei's enthronement. In the entry for August 25, 1847 (Kōka 4), the diary records that the crown was in fact an object of Emperor Go-Momozono, and that its ryū (旒) and other parts had been damaged and repaired. (Note: The original text is "御玉冠、御古物御修復、其實ハ、後桃園院御料.")

Since Emperor Go-Momozono held his enthronement ceremony in 1771 (Meiwa 8), the crown may originally have been made for that ceremony and later repaired for Emperor Kōmei's enthronement in 1847.

== Description ==
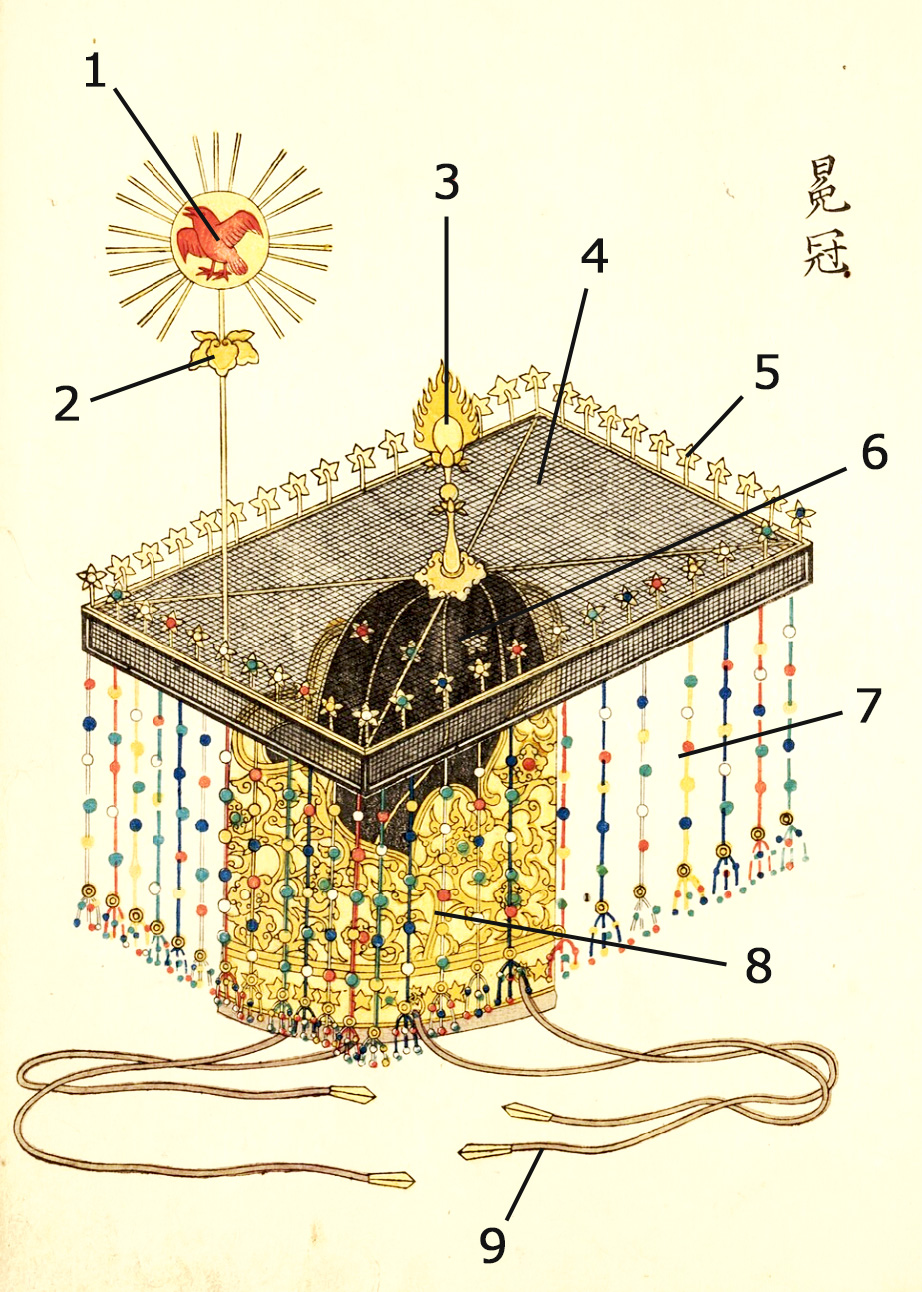
Benkan diagram: 1. Sun and three-legged crow; 2. Auspicious clouds; 3. Flaming jewel; 4. Benban; 5. Tatetama; 6. Koji (cap); 7. Pendant ornaments; 8. Oshikazura (openwork crown); 9. Chinstraps

The crown measures 20.5 cm in length, 19.5 cm in width, and 37.5 cm in height. Its materials include copper, gilding, thin silk (ra), brocade, crystal, and glass. Its techniques include forging and gilding.

The crown has a rounded black silk cap called a koji (巾子). Around this inner cap is an openwork outer crown called an oshikazura (押鬘). The lower part of the oshikazura is covered with brocade woven in a checkered design, and narrow metal bands decorated with bead-like motifs are attached along its upper and lower edges.

The upper part of the oshikazura is made of openwork metal with floral and arabesque designs. It is decorated in places with three-dimensional six-petaled floral ornaments, each with a colored glass bead set in the center.

At the top of the crown is a rectangular board called a benban (冕板), made of a gilt-copper frame covered with black thin silk (ra). In the center of the benban is a flaming jewel ornament consisting of flames and a crystal jewel. In front of it stands a gilt-copper rod supporting a sun-shaped ornament, within which a three-legged crow (Yatagarasu) is carved. Below the sun-shaped ornament is an ornament in the form of auspicious clouds (瑞雲, zuiun).

Around the four sides of the benban are tatetama (立玉; lit. 'upright jewels') ornaments, consisting of gilt-copper stems with petal-shaped fittings inlaid with colored beads. The sides of the benban are divided into three sections, each of which contains two superimposed five-petaled gilt-copper floral ornaments.

Emperor Kōmei depicted wearing the ryūei no kanmuri, not the benkan.

Eighteen pendant ornaments hang from each side of the benban. Nine of the eighteen are long chain-like pendants made of thin wire rings linked together, with colored glass beads set between the rings. Each of these long pendants divides into three terminal strands at the end. The other nine are shorter pendants with gilt-copper bud-shaped ornaments at their tips.

In the basic count, the crown has seventy-two pendant ornaments, eighteen on each of the four sides of the benban. If the three terminal strands of the longer pendants are counted separately, the total number of terminal strands is 144. By contrast, the Chinese emperor's mianguan typically had twelve pendant strings at the front and twelve at the back, for a total of twenty-four. The numerical arrangement of the Japanese benkan therefore did not simply follow the Confucian ritual interpretations that governed the Chinese mianguan.

The pendant ornaments of Emperor Kōmei's benkan are not made by threading beads onto cords, as in the Chinese mianguan. Instead, they are made by linking wire rings in a chain-like form and attaching jewels and metal ornaments to them. This construction has been interpreted as reflecting older Japanese traditions of gilt-metal crowns and jeweled ornaments, including ornaments found on Buddhist statues.

== Comparison with other benkan ==
A benkan dated to 1654 has been handed down to Yasaka Shrine in Kyoto as a sacred treasure. This crown shares several features with Emperor Kōmei's benkan, including the sun-shaped ornament standing in front of the benban, the tatetama arranged around the four sides of the benban, and the ring-linked construction of the pendant ornaments. This indicates that a crown similar in style to Emperor Kōmei's benkan existed by the mid-17th century.

The benkan of Emperor Ninkō is also preserved as an imperial treasure in the Higashiyama Gobunko, the imperial archive at the Kyoto Imperial Palace. Its form is almost the same as that of Emperor Kōmei's benkan.

== See also ==
- Benkan
- Kanmuri (headwear)
- Raikan

== Bibliography ==
- Matsudaira, Norimasa (2006). 図説宮中柳営の秘宝 [Illustrated: Treasures of the Imperial Family and the Shoguns] (in Japanese). Kawade Shobō Shinsha. ISBN 978-4309760810.
- Takeda, Sachiko; Tsuda, Daisuke (2016-08-20). 礼服―天皇即位儀礼や元旦の儀の花の装い― [Ceremonial Dress: Floral Attire for the Emperor's Accession Ceremony and New Year's Day Ceremony] (in Japanese). Osaka University Press. ISBN 978-4872595512.
- Kyoto National Museum, ed. (October 2020). 御即位記念 特別展 皇室の名宝 [The Enthronement Special Exhibition: Imperial Treasures] (in Japanese). The Yomiuri Shimbun.
