= Awata no Mahito =

Awata no Mahito 粟田真人
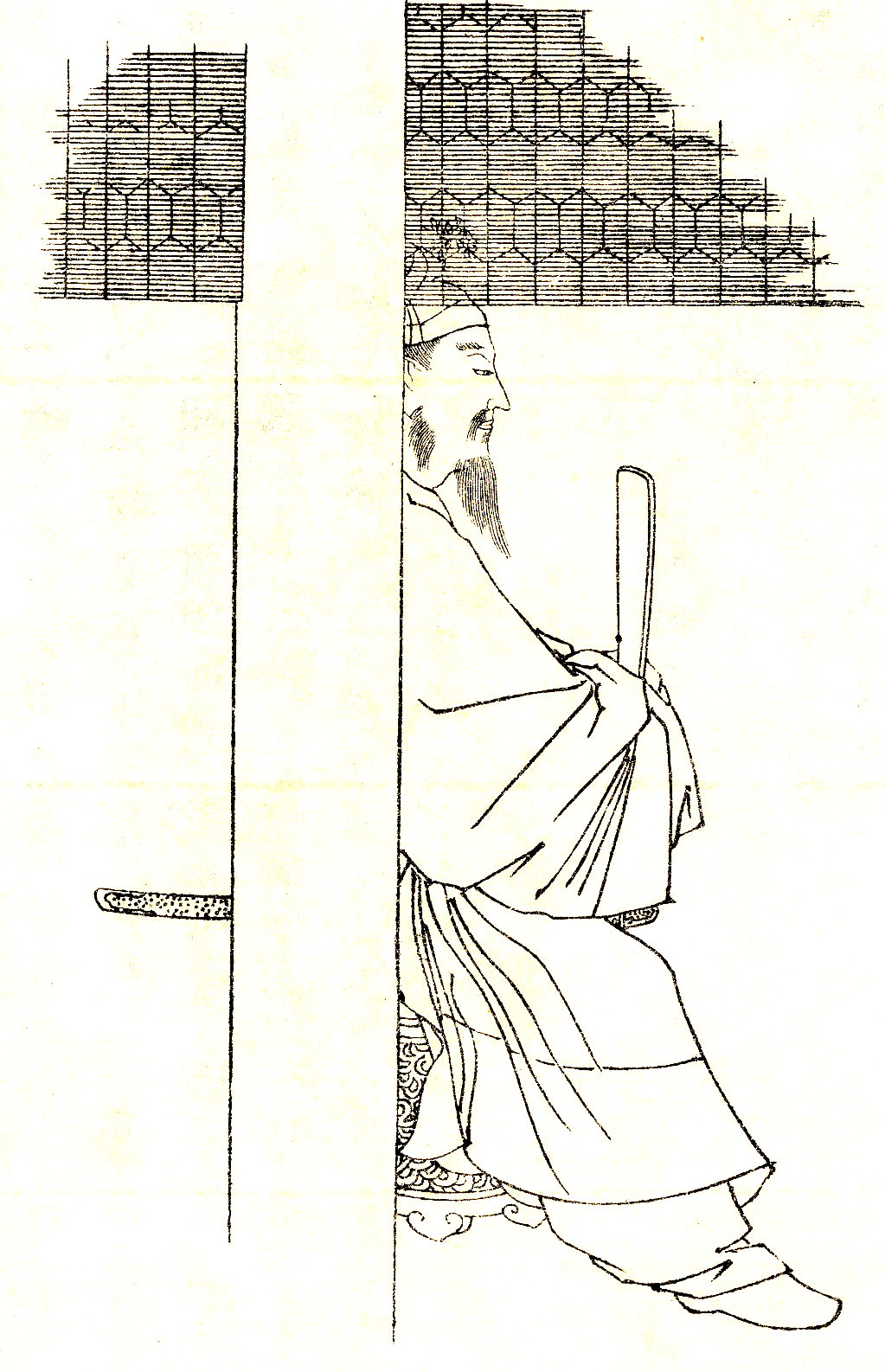
- Illustration by Kikuchi Yōsai, from Zenken Kojitsu
- Died: February 28, 719

Awata no Mahito (粟田 真人; ? – February 28, 719) was a Japanese nobleman of the late Asuka period and early Nara period.

== Life ==
Mahito was born into the Awata family, descended from the Wani clan (和珥氏) and Kasuga clan (春日氏) and based in Yamashiro Province.

In 681, Mahito was conferred the rank of shōkin-ge (小錦下), corresponding to the lower junior fifth rank (従五位下) under the Ritsuryō court rank system. With the establishment of the yakusa no kabane system in 684, he gained the title of Ason. In 689, he became vice-director of the dazaifu. He developed experience entertaining guests of honor from other countries. He took part in the planning of the Taihō Code alongside Prince Osakabe and Fujiwara no Fuhito, and in 701 was promoted to head of the Ministry of Popular Affairs. Mahito was also appointed as chief diplomat on a mission to Tang China, receiving a ceremonial sword settō (節刀) from Emperor Tenmu as a symbol of his command. This was the first example of such a sword being bestowed, and the action would be repeated for other emissaries to Tang and for important generals.

In mid-702 he was promoted to sangi, and a month later departed for China, accompanied by Yamanoue no Okura and the monk Dōji (道慈) and bearing the Taihō Code. This was the first full Japanese diplomatic mission to China since the two met in conflict at the Battle of Baekgang. In addition to restoring normal relations, the mission also allowed for the continued maintenance of Ritsuryō, and offered an opportunity to inform China of Japan's name change from Yamato (倭) to Nihon (日本). Arriving in Chang'an the next year, the envoys had an audience with Empress Consort Wu. The Chinese evaluated Mahito as a poised and elegant man, well-read and learned in the Chinese classics, and he received a temporary position in the government from the Empress.

In 704, the mission returned to Japan, along with some Japanese who had been captives since the Battle of Baekgang. Mahito was rewarded with land in Yamato Province. He was promptly promoted to chūnagon to put the knowledge he gained in China to use in the planning of the Keiun Reform of Ritsuryō.

Upon entering the priesthood, he took on the Dharma name Dōkan (道観). He held further positions, including as director of the Dazaifu, before being promoted to the senior third rank (正三位) in 715, and dying in 719.
