= Raikan =

Traditional Japanese official headwear

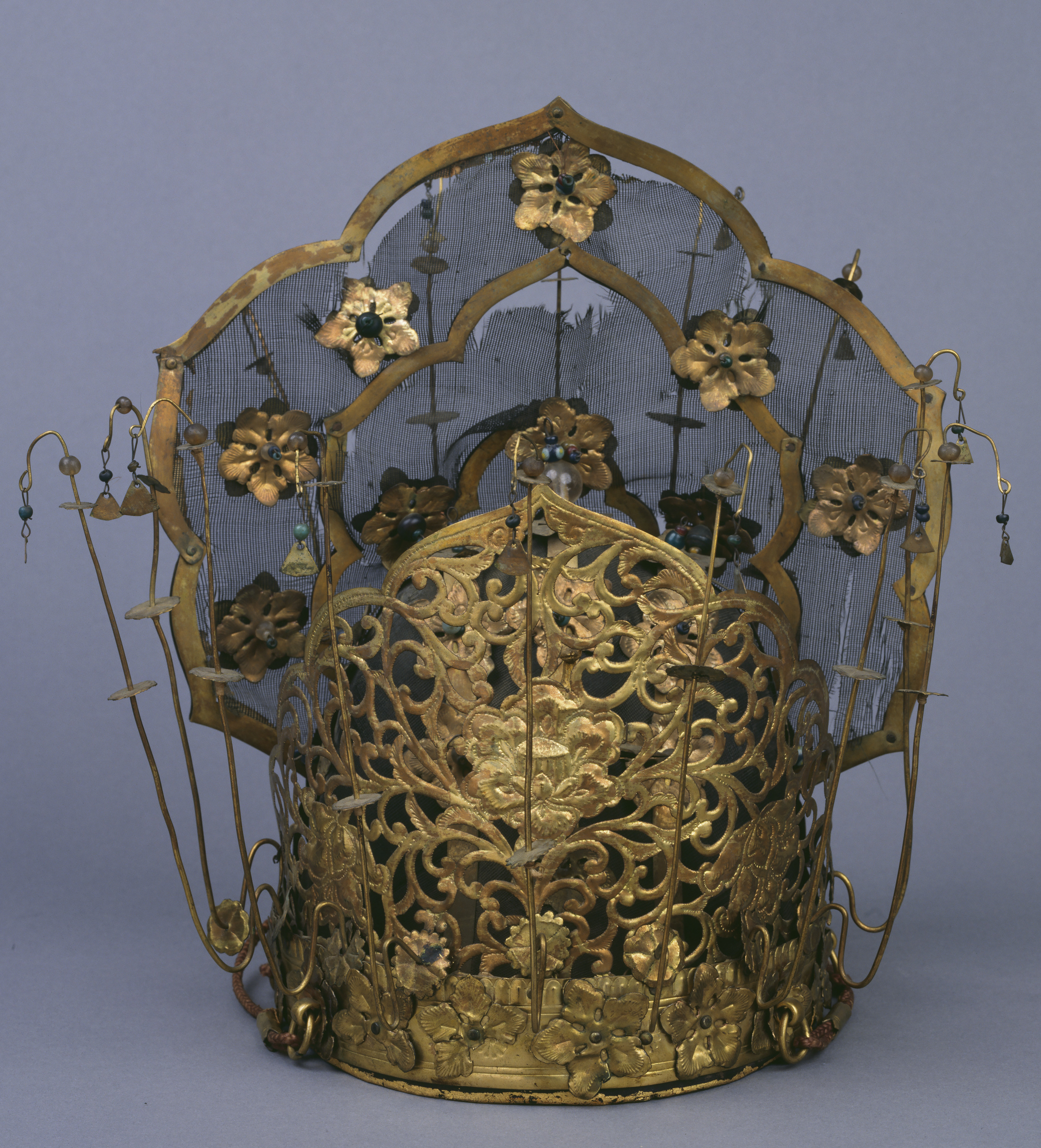
The oldest extant raikan, 16th century. Worn by Tameyoshi Gojo at the enthronement ceremony of Emperor Go-Yōzei.

The raikan (Japanese: 礼冠, Hepburn: raikan; lit. 'ceremonial crown') is a type of crown worn by Japanese nobility. It was last used during the enthronement ceremony of Emperor Kōmei in 1846.

== Background ==
In ancient Japan, it was customary to place flowers, branches, and leaves of plants and trees as hair ornaments on the head, sometimes wrapped around it. These hair ornaments were called uzu (髻華) or kazura (鬘).

When Empress Suiko (reigned 593–628) established the Twelve Level Cap and Rank System in 603, gold and silver uzu were placed on cloth crowns that were color-coded according to rank. In a description of Japan in the Book of Sui (636), it is written, "In the Sui Dynasty, that (Japanese) king created the system of crowns for the first time. The crowns were made of brocade or patterned cloth, and were further adorned with gold or silver floral ornaments." (Note: The original text is "至隋，其王始制冠，以錦綵為之，以金銀鏤花為飾。".) Also, according to the article of December 603 in Nihon Shoki (Chronicles of Japan), on the first day of the year, uzu (髻花) was attached to the crown. (Note: The original text is "唯、元日着髻花。".) Thus, later, metal floral ornaments were also called uzu.

In the Nara period (710-794), the "Taihō Code" and "Yōrō Code" clothing ordinances established the ceremonial dress, court dress, and uniforms to be worn by the crown prince and below. The raikan was part of the most formal ceremonial attire, worn together with ceremonial dress, at important ceremonies such as chōga (朝賀; lit. 'New Year's greetings') and the enthronement ceremony, but later, when chōga was abolished, it came to be used only for the enthronement ceremony.

The raikan was used by those of the fifth rank or higher. The emperor and the crown prince used the benkan, which is also called the raikan in a broader definition. At first, the raikan was only worn by civilian officials, but later the buraikan (武礼冠; lit. 'military ceremonial crown') was established for military officials.

The raikan is composed of an inner crown made of cloth and an outer crown made of metal that surrounds it, with flower stalks standing in a row around it and a halo-like ornament at the back of the crown. The floral arabesque design of the outer crown is thought to be descended from the ancient uzu and kazura, as well as from the Twelve Level Cap and Rank System.

== Structure ==
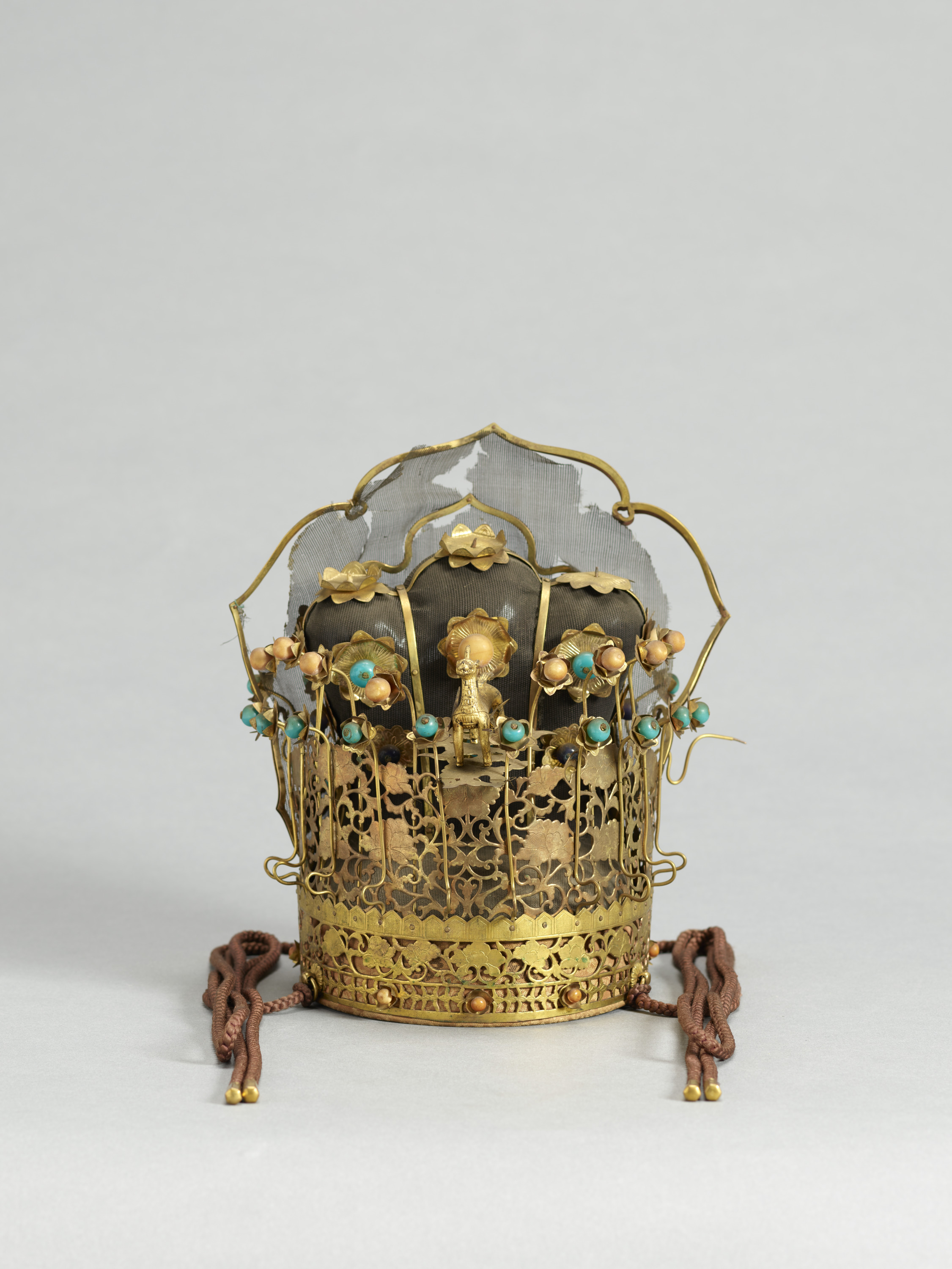
Raikan, 18th century; the qilin in shirushi represents the raikan of the vassals

- Sanzankan (三山冠, lit. 'three mountain crowns'): The inner crown is called sanzankan because it forms the shape of three mountains. It is made of thin silk lacquered in black.
- Kanawa (金輪, lit. 'metal ring'): The outer crown surrounds the sanzankan. It features openwork in a floral arabesque design. Gold and silver were used according to rank. Raikan from the early modern period were exclusively gilded.
- Kōhai (光背, lit. 'halo'): A petal-shaped decoration placed behind the sanzankan. It is made of thin black silk stretched over a metal frame.
- Sue-tama (据玉, lit. 'fixed jewel'): A jewel attached to the top of the sanzankan crown. The jewel sits atop a petal-shaped metal plate.
- Tate-tama (立玉, lit. 'standing jewel'): A metal rod or wire stem with a jeweled ball attached to its tip. It encircles the outer crown.
- Shirushi (徴, lit. 'symbol'): An ornament on the front of the crown in the shape of a sacred beast. The sacred beast varies according to rank. Shirushi from the early modern period were made of wood and covered with gold leaf.

== Military Officials ==
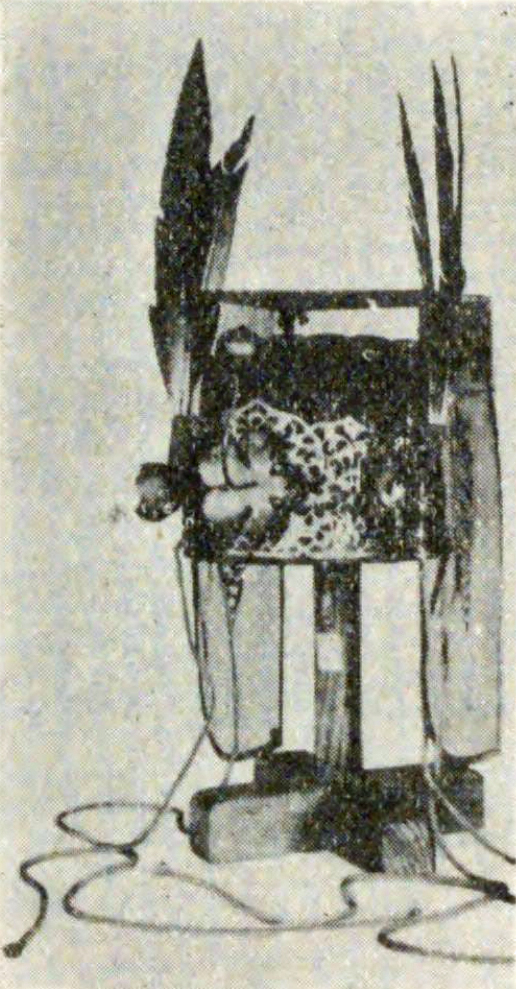
Buraikan

According to the clothing regulations for military officials in the Yōrō Code, the ceremonial crown for military officials is described as a black silk gauze crown (皂羅冠, kuri no usuhata no kanmuri) with black horsehair fan ornaments (皂緌, kuri no oikake). In later periods, military officials wore black gauze crowns adorned with fan-shaped decorations called oikake on both sides. However, it remains unclear whether earlier crowns shared the same design.

In ritual texts such as Jōgan Gishiki (貞観儀式) (9th century) and Engi-shiki (延喜式) (10th century), the ceremonial crown for military officials is referred to as the bureikan (武礼冠; lit. 'military ceremonial crown'). While the regulations for civil officials’ ceremonial crowns are detailed, the specific details of the bureikan are not mentioned.

According to Fujiwara no Sadanaga’s Record of the Enthronement of Emperor Go-Toba, the bureikan is described as follows: “A black cap is worn beneath the crown. A triple layer of twisted silk cord is inserted between the cap and the crown to prevent the crown from sinking too deeply. Two purple cords are attached to the crown and tied outside the ears.” The record further notes that more detailed information on the bureikan can be found in the Gōki (江記), although no corresponding passage exists in the Record of the Enthronement of Emperor Go-Sanjō (後三条院御即位記), attributed to Ōe no Masafusa.

In 1735, during the enthronement ceremony of Emperor Sakuramachi, the bureikan was revived. Its design resembled the Chinese wǔbiàn crown (武弁冠) or lóng crown (籠冠), but it is difficult to determine whether it was based on ancient Japanese records or influenced by Chinese references.

According to the Record of the Enthronement Procedures (御即位次第抄), found in the Imperial Section of the Kojiruien (古事類苑), the bureikan was made from purple silk and fashioned into a five-peaked crown. Around the crown, openwork decorations featuring floral arabesque patterns were made from gilt bronze. A box-shaped ornament made of gauze was placed on top, with black gauze stretched across the back. Three pheasant feathers were inserted on each side at the front of the crown for decoration.

== See also ==
- Benkan
- Kanmuri
- Raifuku
