= Kon'e =

Japanese formal court robe

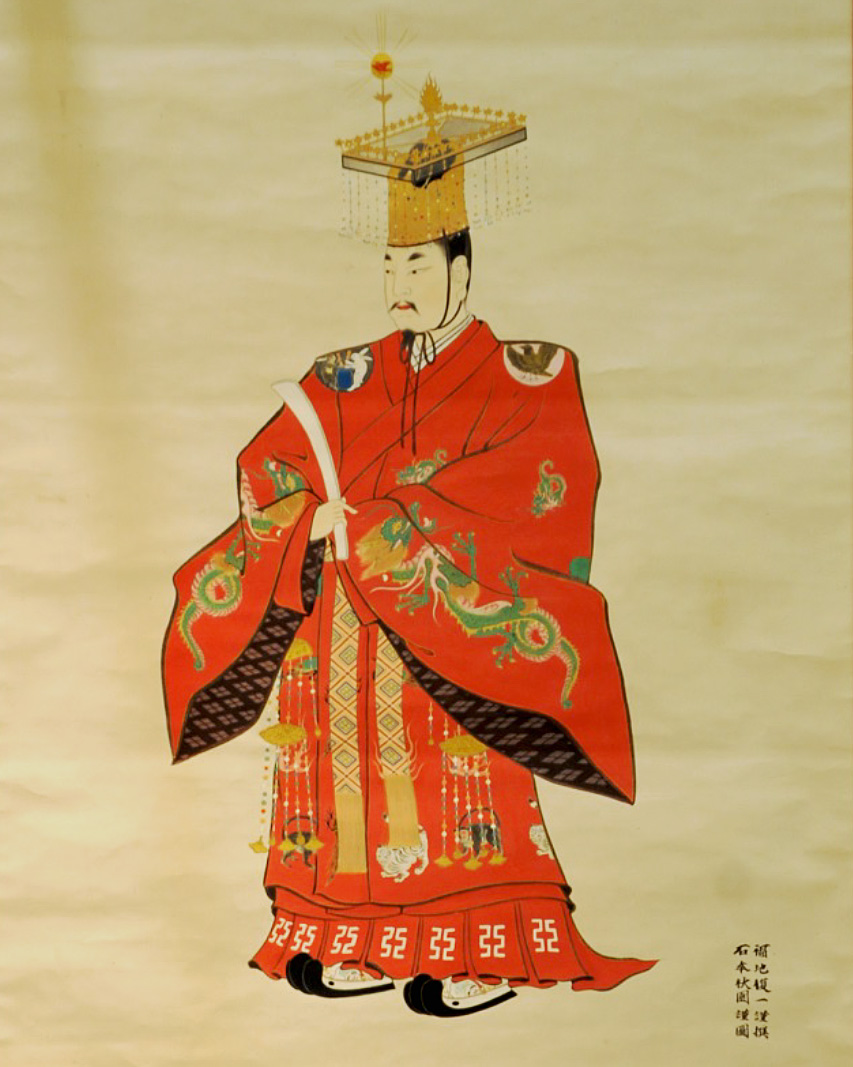
Emperor Go-Sanjō wearing the Konben (Kon'e and Benkan), from Portrait of the Emperor in Grand Ceremonial Attire by Ishimoto Shūen

The Kon'e (袞衣) is a type of formal court robe traditionally worn by the Emperor of Japan. It corresponds to the Chinese gǔnfú (袞服), a ceremonial robe for emperors featuring dragon embroidery, used during major state rituals in ancient China. In Japan, the Kon'e was worn together with the Benkan (冕冠; imperial crown) during important court ceremonies such as the Sokui no rei (即位の礼; Enthronement Ceremony) and the Chōga (朝賀; New Year's imperial audience).

In China, the robe was also known by the classical expression xuányī xūncháng (玄衣纁裳, lit. 'dark robe and red skirt'), referring to its black upper garment and light red skirt. In contrast, the Japanese Kon'e features red garments for both the upper and lower sections. A distinctive characteristic of the Japanese style is the way the mo (裳)—a mid-length ceremonial wrap skirt—is worn over the hakama (袴, traditional trousers), creating a uniquely Japanese configuration of lower-body garments.

The Kon'e remained in use until the enthronement of Emperor Kōmei in 1847. Beginning with Emperor Meiji, the official attire for enthronement ceremonies became the Kōrozen no gohō (黄櫨染御袍; robe dyed in yellow sappanwood).

== Overview ==
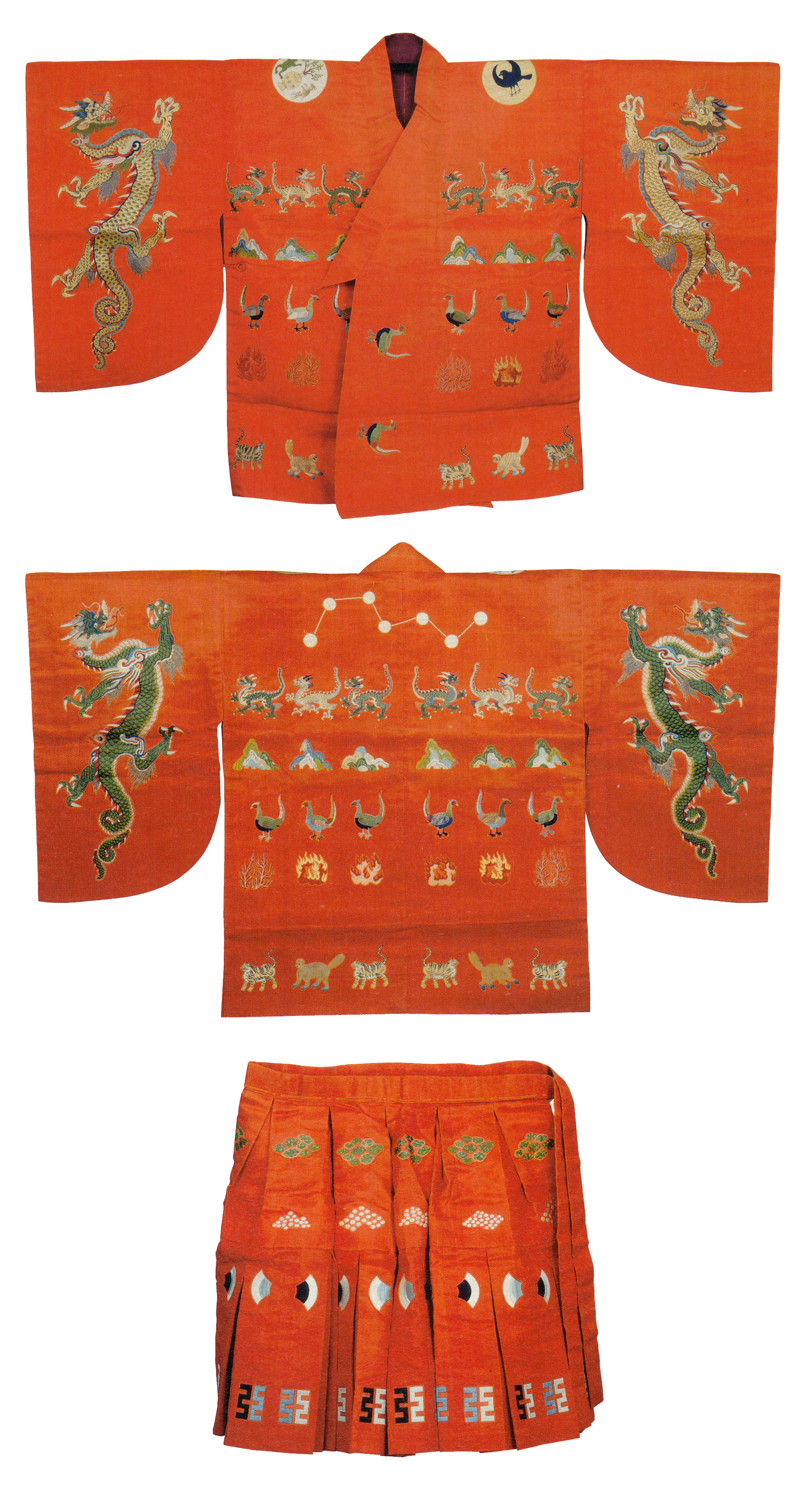
Kon'e of Emperor Kōmei (ōsode and mo)

The term Kon'e (袞衣) is an abbreviation of Konryō no Gyoi (袞龍御衣), which means a "dragon-embroidered ceremonial robe". Originating in China, the Kon'e was a ceremonial robe adorned with dragon motifs. The Book of Songs (Shijing) mentions such a robe in the "Bin feng" section, describing King Cheng of Zhou wearing it to greet the Duke of Zhou. (Note: The original text reads: 「我覯之子，袞衣繡裳」, translated as "I saw that man—he wore a robe with dragon embroidery and an embroidered train," referring to the Duke of Zhou.)

The Rites of Zhou (Zhouli), in the "Ministry of Spring" section, states: "When offering rites to former kings, [the emperor] wears the Kon'e and Benkan (冕冠)." A commentary adds that the character "Kon" specifically refers to garments embroidered with coiled dragons.

In Japan, the Kon'e became the emperor's most formal court attire and was worn at ceremonies such as the enthronement ceremony and the Chōga (朝賀). The outfit consisted of a wide-sleeved outer robe (大袖, ōsode), an inner robe (小袖, kosode), and a pleated ceremonial skirt called mo (裳). Both the ōsode and mo were embroidered with the twelve imperial insignia, known in Japanese as Jūnishō (十二章), a set of symbolic emblems representing imperial authority, including dragons. Until the enthronement of Emperor Kōmei, the Kon'e and Benkan were worn together in such rituals, and the complete ensemble was known as Konben (袞冕), Benpuku (冕服), or Konben Jūnishō (袞冕十二章).

The Chinese equivalent traditionally followed the xuányī xūncháng (玄衣纁裳, lit. 'dark robe and red skirt') standard—featuring a black upper garment and a red lower one. In contrast, the Japanese Kon'e was entirely red. One theory attributes this color scheme to early Sui dynasty practices described in the Book of Sui. However, the Japanese adoption of the Kon'e occurred during the Tang dynasty, whose legal clothing code retained the black-and-red configuration. Although Emperor Wen of Sui (Yang Jian) altered court dress for audiences to an all-red format, ceremonial robes such as the Kon'e remained unchanged.

Another theory links the red color to solar symbolism. The Japanese Benkan features a sun-shaped ornament not found in Chinese counterparts, possibly signifying the emperor's status as "Son of the Sun". From this perspective, the all-red color may have been chosen to represent the sun, aligning with Japan's image as the "Land of the Rising Sun".

== History ==
=== Nara period (710–794) ===
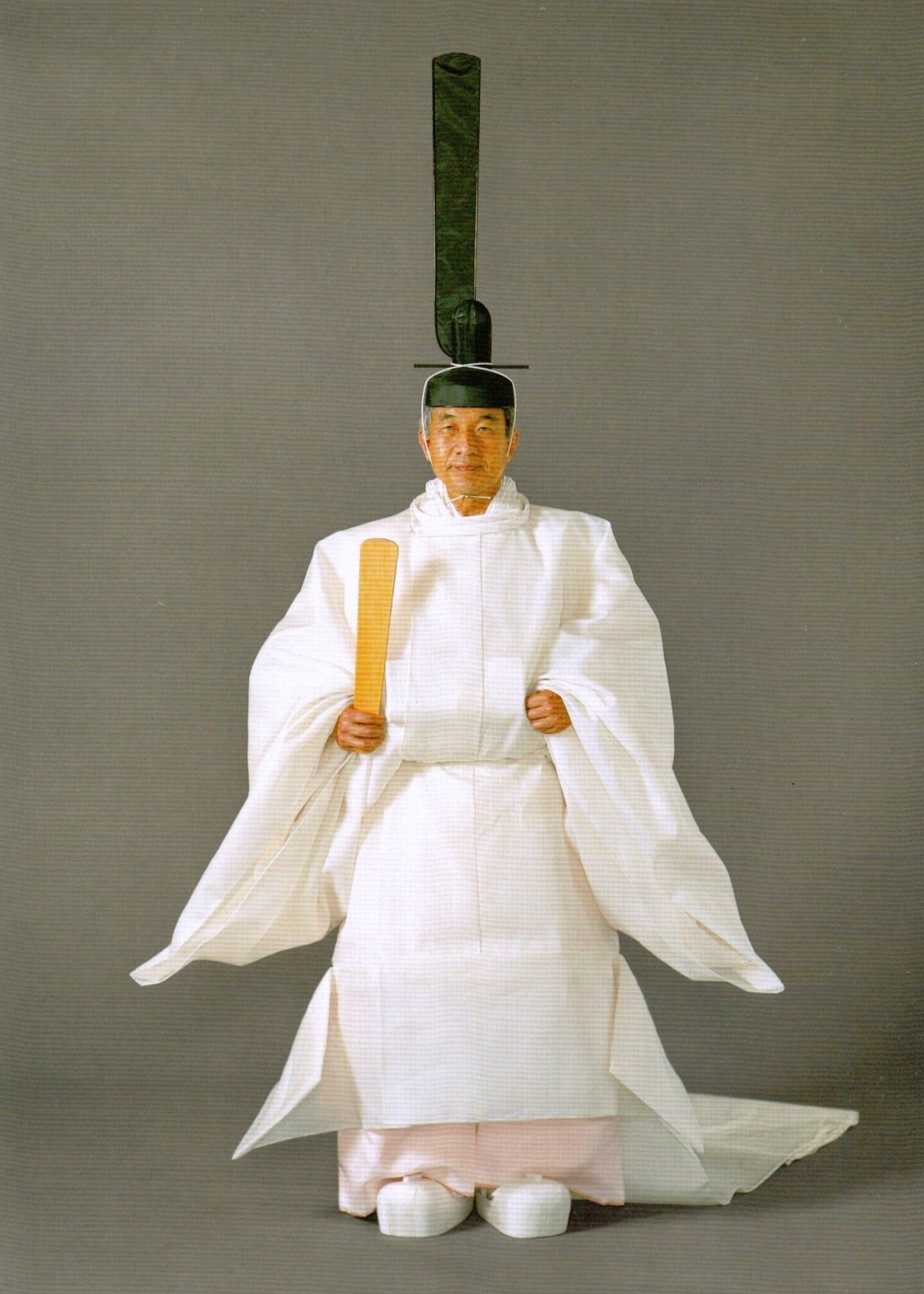
Emperor Akihito wearing the gosai-fuku (imperial ritual attire)

According to the Shoku Nihongi, "On the first day of the first month in the fourth year of Tenpyō, the emperor received the New Year's audience at the Daigokuden (大極殿, main audience hall of the imperial palace), wearing the Konben (Kon'e and Benkan) for the first time." Based on this record, it is considered that the emperor first wore the Kon'e and the Benkan in 732 (Tenpyō 4). However, it is thought that this did not yet include the full Kon'e adorned with the twelve imperial insignia (十二章, jūnishō).

The "Edicts on Attire" (衣服令) within the Yōrō Code contain regulations for the attire of the Crown Prince and other officials, but none concerning the emperor's dress. For instance, the Crown Prince's formal dress is specified as ōni no koromo (黄丹衣), a reddish-yellow robe, but the formal color of the emperor's attire remains unknown.

At the Shōsōin repository, there remains a case labeled "Surviving Portions of Ornaments for Imperial Ceremonial Attire and Crowns" (礼服御冠残欠), which is believed to contain fragments of the imperial ceremonial crowns worn by Emperor Shōmu (as Retired Emperor) and Empress Kōmyō (as Empress Dowager). Inside the case is a wooden tag indicating that these items were their formal ceremonial robes. The reverse of the tag is inscribed with the date "April 9, 752" (Tenpyō Shōhō 4), which corresponds to the date of the Eye-Opening Ceremony of the Great Buddha at Tōdaiji. It is therefore believed that these garments were worn on that occasion.

Although the garments themselves no longer survive, records of ceremonial airing (bakuryō, insect-proof airing) are preserved in the Shōsōin documents. The Bakuryōshi-ge (Report of the Airing Officials) from 793 (Enryaku 12) and the Kanmotsushi-ge (Inventory Report by the Shōsōin Treasure Inspectors) from 811 (Kōnin 2) describe Emperor Shōmu's formal robe as a haku no awasehō (帛袷袍), that is, a lined white silk robe.

White has long symbolized purity and freedom from defilement, and even today, the ceremonial robes worn by the Emperor of Japan during the Daijōsai and Niinamesai are pure white. It is therefore inferred that the ceremonial attire of emperors during the Nara period consisted of undecorated white garments, which were inherited in later forms such as the hakuginu (帛衣, white silk robe) and gosai-fuku (御祭服, imperial ritual attire).

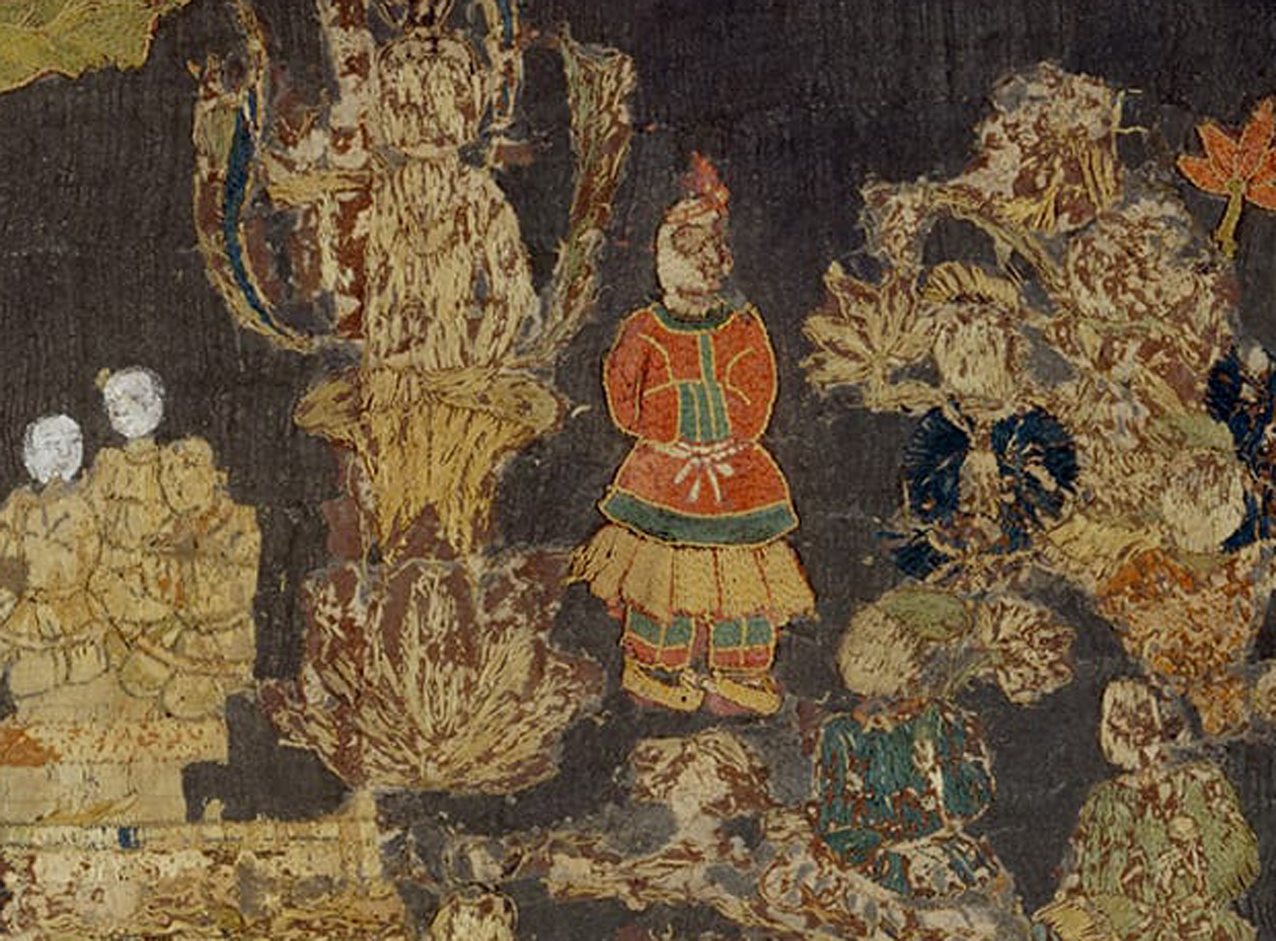
A male figure from the Tenjukoku Shūchō Mandala, wearing a skirt-like hirami over trousers

According to the Shōsōin documents, the ceremonial ensemble of Emperor Shōmu consisted of the following items:

- robe (haku no awasehō, 帛袷袍)
- inner garments (ōshi, 襖子; one padded with cotton and one unpadded)
- undergarment (kansan, 汗衫)
- short pleated overskirt (hirami, 褶; made of gauze brocade)
- pair of trousers (hakama, 袴; padded with cotton)
- wrapping cloths (awase fukushi, 袷幞子; two sets each)

The hō (袍) refers to the outer robe, while the ōshi (襖子) are inner garments with linings. Jomen (絮綿) indicates cotton padding, and awase (袷) refers to unpadded lined garments. The kansan (汗衫) is an unlined undergarment. The hirami (褶) is a short, pleated wrap skirt, equivalent to the later mo (裳). The fukushi (幞子) are cloths used for wrapping.

In the Tang dynasty, the emperor's gǔnfú (袞服) was composed of two distinct garments, following the traditional yi-shang (衣裳) system—yi (衣), the upper garment, and shang (裳), a skirt-like lower garment. In contrast, the Japanese imperial ceremonial attire consisted of three components: the upper robe, a pair of trousers (hakama), and a short pleated overskirt (hirami), reflecting a different development in the structure of court dress.

While Chinese court attire did not include skirt-like garments worn over trousers, Japanese formal dress—both for the emperor and civil officials—included hirami worn over hakama. The hirami, a short pleated overskirt, later came to be referred to as mo in the Heian period.

The use of hirami in Japanese court dress represents a continuous tradition dating back to the Asuka period, and was incorporated into the design of the Kon'e. Although inspired by Tang models, the Japanese formal costume developed its own distinctive structure for the lower body.

At the Shōsōin, a pair of shoes known as Nō-no-gorairi (衲御礼履), believed to have been worn by Emperor Shōmu at the Eye-Opening Ceremony of the Great Buddha, are preserved today.

=== Heian period (794–1185) ===
The Kon'e was formally designated as the emperor's ritual attire by an imperial edict issued in 820 (Kōnin 11) by Emperor Saga. According to the Nihon Kiryaku, the edict stipulated that the emperor should wear the Hakuginu (帛衣) for Shinto rituals, the Konben Jūnishō (袞冕十二章; Kon'e and Benkan adorned with the Twelve Ornaments) for the imperial New Year's audience (Chōga), and the Kōrozen no gohō (黄櫨染衣) for various official events.

The term Konben Jūnishō refers to the combination of the Benkan (冕冠; imperial crown), which bears twelve hanging ornaments (ryū 旒) of beaded strings, and the Kon'e, which is embroidered with twelve symbolic motifs known as the Jūnishō (十二章, Twelve Ornaments).

An entry dated July 4, 1036 (Chōgen 9) in the Doyūki (土右記), the diary of Minamoto no Morofusa, records the ritual known as Reifuku Goran (礼服御覧), in which Emperor Go-Suzaku inspected the Konben Jūnishō that he would wear for his upcoming enthronement ceremony. This ritual involved removing the garments from storage in the Kuraryō (内蔵寮, Bureau of Palace Storehouses) for direct examination by the emperor.

According to the diary, the upper garment of the emperor's attire was made of scarlet twill and described as "ōsode hi-iro aya" (大袖緋色綾), meaning "wide-sleeved scarlet twill". It was embroidered with eight symbolic motifs—sun, moon, mountain, flame, bird, dragon, tiger, and monkey—referred to collectively as the Jūnishō. The kosode (小袖, inner robe) and the mo (裳, ceremonial wrap skirt) were also scarlet and embroidered with patterns such as folding branches, axe shapes, and tomoe (巴) characters. The kosode was worn beneath the outer garment and was unembroidered. It corresponds to the ōshi (襖子) of the Nara period.

Several distinctions can be observed between the Japanese Kon'e and the Chinese gǔnfú. While inspired by the Chinese prototype, Japan adopted red instead of white and added the Jūnishō embroidery. Aside from these features, the design largely continued the imperial attire of the Nara period. Scholars suggest that Japan's interpretation of Tang customs was superficial, leading to a stylized form of "Tang-style" attire that reflected domestic adaptations more than faithful replication.

Initially, the Kon'e was worn exclusively for the New Year's imperial audience, but it was later adopted for use in enthronement ceremonies as well. After the abolition of Chōga in 993 (Shōryaku 4), the Kon'e remained reserved for enthronement ceremonies until the late Edo period.

=== Kamakura period (1185–1333) ===
An entry dated March 3, 1288 (Kōan 11) in the Gofukakusa-in Gyoki (後深草院御記, "Diary of Retired Emperor Go-Fukakusa") records that Retired Emperor Go-Fukakusa inspected the ceremonial robes in preparation for the enthronement of his son, Emperor Fushimi.

On the 3rd day, this morning, the lady-in-waiting Tenji no Noriko brought the ceremonial robes in a karabitsu (lacquered wooden trunk). I privately viewed them. Inside the cedar karabitsu were four lacquered boxes. One was a square black-lacquered box containing the ōsode (outer robe), kosode (inner robe), and mo (ceremonial wrap skirt). The ōsode was red and embroidered. On the left shoulder was the shape of the sun, with a three-legged crow depicted within it. On the right shoulder was the shape of the moon, containing a vase with a branch of cassia, and to its sides were a rabbit and a frog. Below that on the back were the Big Dipper stars, and beneath them were rows of embroidered dragons running continuously around the garment, each about four or five sun (寸) in length. Below the dragons were shapes of mountains, and beneath that were embroidered shapes of birds, flames, tigers, and monkeys, each arranged in a row. On each sleeve was an embroidered dragon. The kosode had a purple lining and was unembroidered. The mo was crimson, with two bands of embroidery at the top and bottom. The upper band had an unreadable pattern (possibly fu 黼), and the lower one resembled the character "己" (futsu 黻), both embroidered in white and green threads. Another box was long and narrow, decorated with silver motifs of fish and water, containing two jade pendants and one sash. The jade pendants had heads, and their bodies were too beautiful for words. The sash was white. The next box held a shaku (ceremonial tablet), made of ivory, square at both ends, and wrapped in a red brocade pouch. The last was a small square box containing one pair of socks, white with purple patterns in the style of old Korea.

This passage indicates that the motifs embroidered on the ōsode matched those found on similar garments in the early modern period. While some of the patterns on the mo are difficult to interpret (such as the upper band possibly being fu 黼), the presence of futsu (黻) in the lower band makes it likely that two of the Twelve Ornaments were represented. Since only ten motifs are explicitly mentioned, scholars infer that all twelve were likely present but only partially described.

When Emperor Kōgon, the first emperor of the Northern Court, viewed the ceremonial attire prior to his enthronement, it was discovered that the garments had become damp due to damage to the storehouse of the Imperial Treasury (Kuraryō). Consequently, the robes were temporarily kept at the residence of his father, Retired Emperor Go-Fushimi. At that time, Go-Fushimi ordered the imperial court painter Takashina Takatsugu to create detailed color illustrations of the robes, which are described in the Jōwa 5 Enthronement Record (『貞和五年御即位記』). It is said that the paintings faithfully reproduced even the colors of the actual garments.

=== Nanboku-chō (1336–1392) and Muromachi period (1336–1573) ===
This period encompasses both the Nanboku-chō period (1336–1392), when rival imperial courts coexisted, and the Muromachi period (1336–1573), under the Ashikaga shogunate.

In 1333 (Shōkyō 2), during the conflicts that accompanied the fall of the Kamakura shogunate, all ceremonial robes for emperors, empresses regnant, young emperors, empresses consort, and crown princes were lost. On 28 December 1337 (Kenmu 4), at the enthronement ceremony of Emperor Kōmyō, the second emperor of the Northern Court, all the garments used in the enthronement were newly made, according to the diary of Emperor Kōmyō (Kōmyō-in Gyoki). The emperor's ceremonial robes were reconstructed almost in their original form, based on a drawing commissioned by Emperor Go-Fushimi. For the benkan, a crown designated for imperial use was taken out from the Shōsōin for reference and newly made.

At the enthronement of Emperor Sukō, the third emperor of the Northern Court, the robes created for Emperor Kōmyō were reused. Since Emperor Go-Komatsu, the 100th emperor, ascended the throne as a child, the Takakura family produced a smaller set of robes modeled on those of Emperor Kōmyō. This is noted in Shōzoku Zatsujishō by Takakura Nagayuki.

At the enthronement of Emperor Shōkō, the 101st emperor, a new set of robes was produced due to the "destruction of the imperial treasury by fire". The newly made items included a benkan, a red ōsode (outer robe), a red kosode (inner robe), a red mo (skirt), a pair of jade pendants (gyokuhai), one ju (sash), an ivory scepter (gyokushaku), brocade socks (nishiki no on-shitōzu), and court shoes, as recorded in the Shōkō-in Go-Sokui-ki.

At the time of Emperor Shōkō's viewing of the ceremonial robes, there were two lacquered chests (karabitsu) for garments and two crown boxes (kanmuri-oke) for the ceremonial headpieces, suggesting that two complete sets of enthronement attire were present. It is therefore believed that the set made for Emperor Kōmyō was the one destroyed in the fire, while the child-sized robes made for Emperor Go-Komatsu were spared.

During the Ōnin War, the emperor's ceremonial robes were safely relocated to Mount Hiei. On 27 March 1474 (Bunmei 6), the court noble Kanroji Chikanaga was dispatched to retrieve the "imperial ceremonial robes" from Mount Hiei, as recorded in the Chikanaga Kyōki. (Note: The original text reads: "廿七日、晴、被預山上御禮服被召寄、予去年向山上令蟲拂了、如存知取出又可蟲拂之由有仰、仍取出、色目見合御目六了、入夜如先納御辛櫃了。")

However, since nearly all other items related to the enthronement ceremony, apart from the emperor's ceremonial robes, were lost in the warfare, the enthronement of Emperor Go-Kashiwabara, the 104th emperor, was delayed for more than twenty years. During this interval, the emperor's robes and benkan were repaired, and new ceremonial robes for the court nobles were prepared. The enthronement ceremony was finally held on 22 March 1521 (Daiei 1). The same robes were reused for the enthronement ceremonies of Emperor Go-Nara (105th) and Emperor Ōgimachi (106th). At the time of Emperor Ōgimachi's enthronement, both the benkan and the jade pendants (gyokuhai) required repairs, which were carried out by Buddhist sculptors, according to the Tokitsugu-kyōki.

=== Azuchi–Momoyama period (1573–1600) ===
The enthronement ceremony of Emperor Go-Yōzei, the 107th emperor, held in 1586 (Tenshō 14), was conducted with the support of the de facto ruler Toyotomi Hideyoshi, and therefore benefited from greater financial resources compared to the preceding Sengoku period. However, while the emperor's sokutai (formal court dress) for summer and winter, as well as his ohiki-nōshi (informal robe), were newly made, the ceremonial robes (kon'e) were not. It is presumed that the ceremonial robes produced during the reign of Emperor Shōkō were reused.

=== Edo period (1603–1868) ===
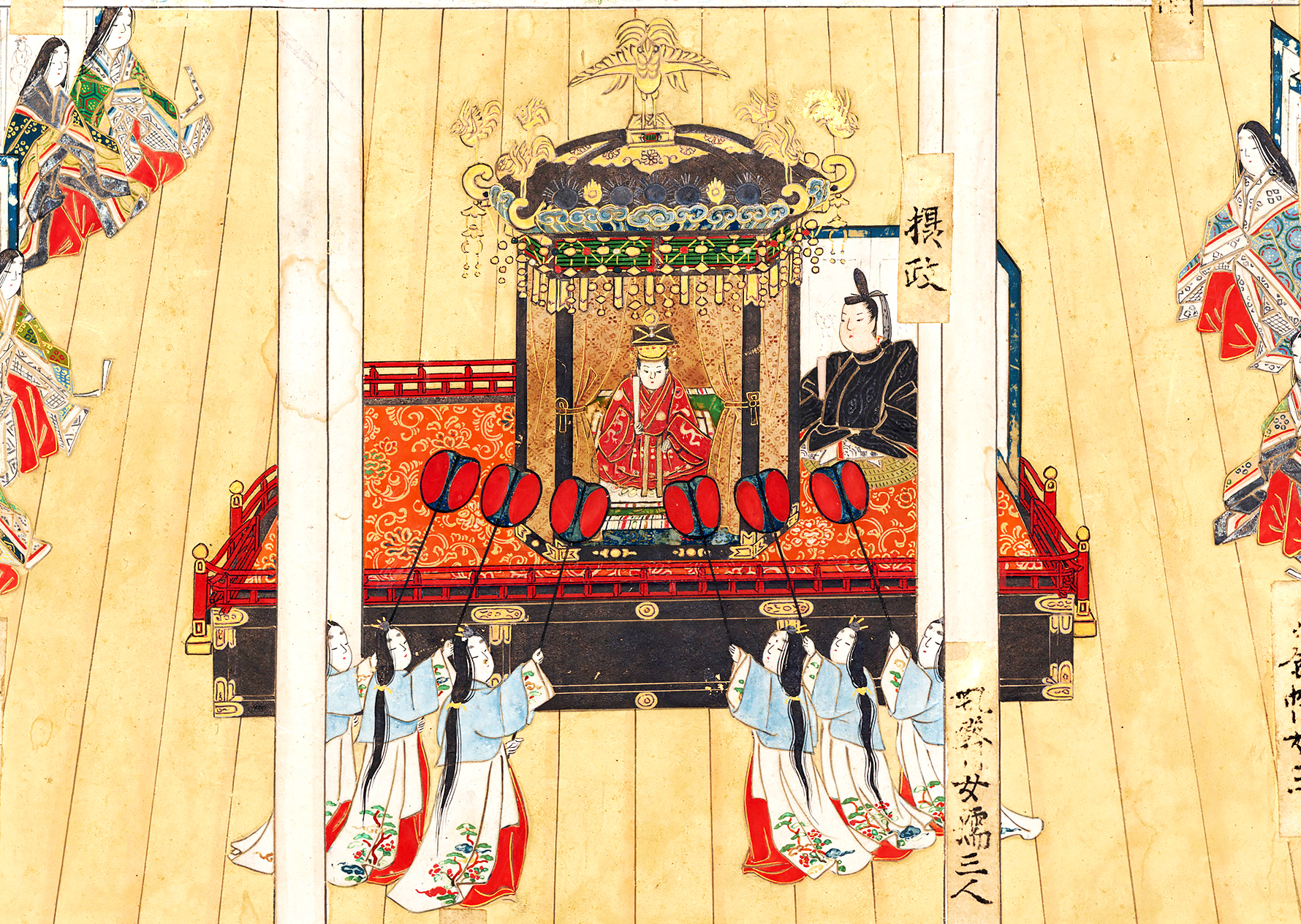
Emperor Reigen wearing the kon'e and benkan, as depicted in the 17th-century folding screen Illustration of the Enthronement of Emperor Reigen and Abdication of Emperor Go-Sai.

It is generally believed that the study and practice of yūsoku kojitsu (有職故実, court and ceremonial precedents) declined during the Sengoku period but were revived in the Edo period. The so-called "Kan'ei Yūsoku" (寛永有職) of this era has sometimes been criticized as overly ornate or excessively focused on splendor.

However, with regard to the kon'e, the design is believed to have been faithfully preserved from before the Sengoku period into the Edo period. This continuity is attributed to the existence of an illustrated reference of the robes commissioned by Emperor Go-Fushimi, as well as the evacuation of court robes to Mount Hiei during the Ōnin War.

At the enthronement ceremony of Emperor Go-Mizunoo, the 108th emperor, held in 1611 (Keichō 16), all types of robes required by the emperor were newly produced, exceeding even the new garments prepared under Toyotomi Hideyoshi's donations. Components of the imperial ceremonial robes newly produced at that time included the ōsode (outer robe), kosode (inner robe), mo (skirt), and shitōzu (ceremonial socks), while the benkan and seki (court shoes) are believed to have been reused.

At the enthronement of Empress Meishō, the 109th monarch, held in 1630 (Kan'ei 7), a new ceremonial robe in the style of the jūnihitoe was prepared, as she was a reigning empress. The fabric was made of plain white karaaya silk, and, following precedent, the twelve imperial insignia (jūnishō) were not applied. (Gyokuro-sō)

At the enthronement of Emperor Go-Kōmyō, the 110th emperor, in 1643 (Kan'ei 20), a new kon'e was produced due to his young age at the time of enthronement. A surviving paper mock-up known as Raifuku-kata (pattern for the ceremonial robe) from this occasion is extant today. The decorative design painted on the paper mock-up is nearly identical to extant examples of actual kon'e.

Many of the existing ceremonial robes were lost in the 1653 (Jōō 2) fire at the imperial palace. However, during the viewing of the robes prior to the enthronement of Emperor Go-Sai in 1656 (Meireki 2), a set of "antique garments" was still present alongside newly prepared robes, leading to the theory that the kon'e used by Emperor Go-Kōmyō had survived.

At the Higashiyama Archive (東山御文庫, Higashiyama Gobunko) within the Kyoto Imperial Palace, the ceremonial robes worn by successive emperors since Emperor Go-Sai have been preserved. A survey of the collection conducted in 1912 (Taishō 1) was compiled as the Gofuku On-mokuoku (Catalogue of Imperial Robes), now held by the Archives and Mausolea Department of the Imperial Household Agency. However, the survey has been criticized for its inaccuracies, and it has been suggested that some garments predating Emperor Go-Sai, possibly even those of Emperor Go-Kōmyō, may have been misattributed.

In the 17th-century folding screen Illustration of the Enthronement of Emperor Reigen and Abdication of Emperor Go-Sai, Emperor Reigen (the 112th emperor) is shown seated on the Takamikura (Imperial Throne), wearing a red kon'e and a benkan. It is unusual for the emperor's face (龍顔, ryūgan) to be directly depicted in enthronement screen paintings.

The kon'e attributed to Emperor Reigen is believed to survive, albeit with the embroidery removed (Tokinarukyō-ki). However, the Gofuku On-mokuroku attributes this robe to Emperor Go-Sai, further underscoring the deficiencies in the catalog.

Additionally, red kon'e (ōsode, kosode, and mo) worn by Emperor Higashiyama (the 113th emperor) and Emperor Kōmei (the 121st emperor) are preserved at the Higashiyama Archive of the Kyoto Imperial Palace. On Emperor Higashiyama's kon'e, the twelve imperial insignia were embroidered directly onto the fabric, whereas in Emperor Kōmei's case, the insignia were embroidered on separate cloth pieces, which were then appliquéd onto the robe.

The embroidery was executed using colored and gold threads. Even when the motifs were the same, variations in color combinations and intricate details were applied to showcase refined craftsmanship.

== Ceremonial Robes of Empress Regnants ==
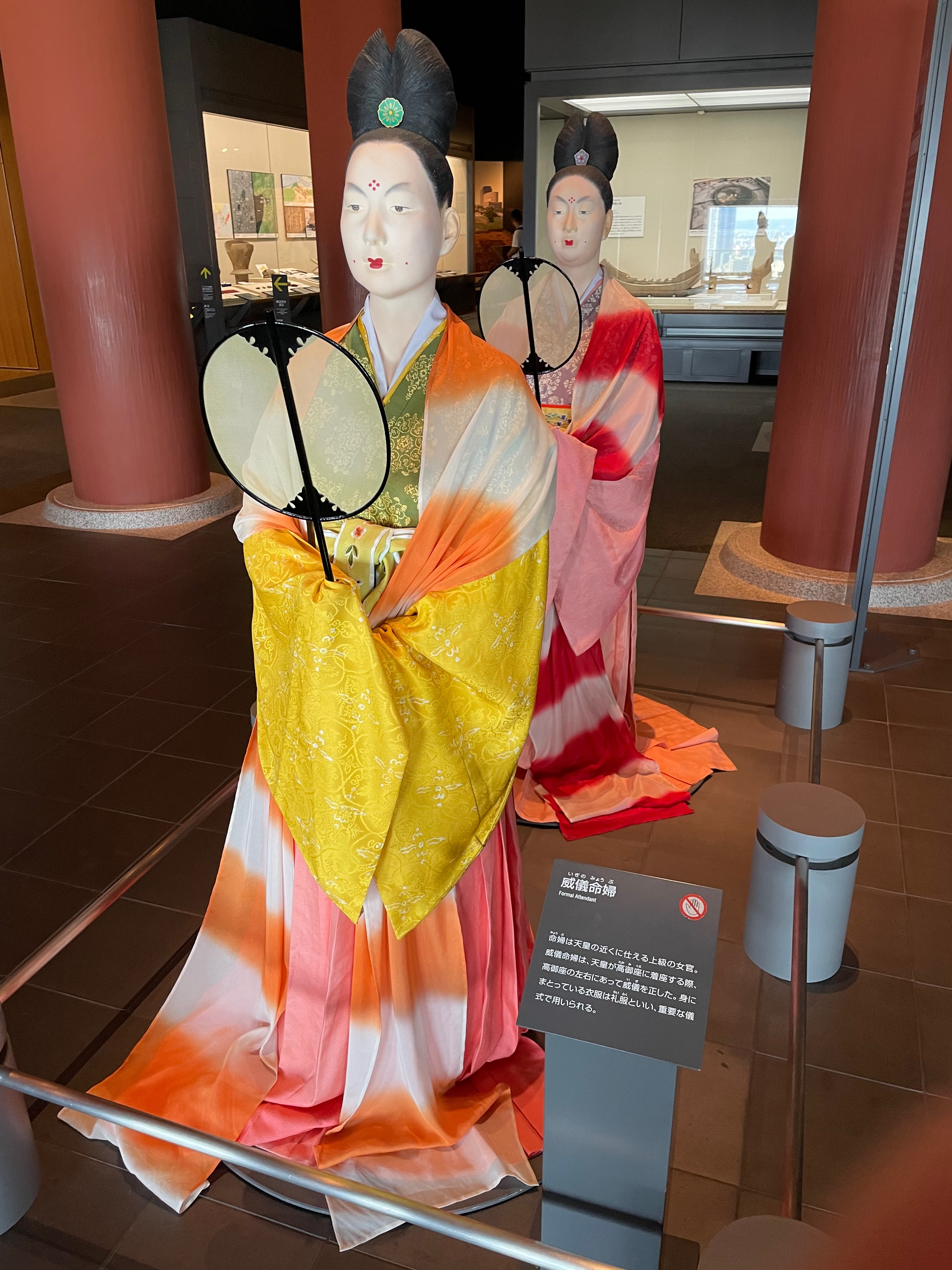
Reconstruction of the ceremonial robes of an igi no myōbu (court lady) in the Nara period, on display at the Osaka Museum of History

There are no extant records in the Shōsōin documents regarding the ceremonial robes of empress regnants (female sovereigns of Japan). However, according to the Doyūki, a ceremonial robe belonging to an empress regnant and stored in the Kuraryō (Bureau of Palace Storehouses) is described as follows:

"大袖、小袖、裙等皆白綾無繍文、小袖下縫付白羅、如男裳者也"

("The outer robe (ōsode), inner robe (kosode), and skirt (kun) were all made of plain white figured silk without embroidery; a sheer white silk (ra) was sewn beneath the kosode in the manner of a man's mo (mo being a short, wraparound skirt panel).")

This indicates that the upper garments, including the ōsode and kosode, as well as the lower garment (kun), were all white, made of figured silk without embroidery, and did not feature the twelve symbolic motifs (jūnishō). The phrase "如男裳者也" implies that the sheer white silk sewn beneath the kosode was constructed in a manner similar to the male emperor's mo (a short, wraparound skirt panel). In contrast to the later jūnihitoe style (five-layered robes with an outer robe and back train), this robe likely retained the pleated hirami structure characteristic of ceremonial garments from the Nara period.

The empress regnant closest in time to the compilation of the Doyūki was Empress Kōken (who later reascended as Empress Shōtoku). Thus, it is considered likely that the described robe belonged to her. If so, this suggests that the ceremonial robes of empress regnants in the Nara period were also white in color.

Regarding the layering order of the skirt and the pleated hirami, since the kosode was worn over the kun (skirt), it is presumed that the pleated hirami was layered on top of the skirt in the case of an empress regnant.

Furthermore, the ceremonial robes worn by Empress Go-Sakuramachi, the 117th monarch and the only empress regnant of the Edo period, are preserved as imperial property in the Higashiyama Archive of the Kyoto Imperial Palace.

== Ceremonial robes of child emperors ==
According to the Doyūki, the ceremonial robes of child emperors (童帝, dōtei) are described as follows: "The ōsode, kosode, and mo were the same in color and embroidery as above." This indicates that the outer robe (ōsode), inner robe (kosode), and skirt panel (mo) were all red, just like those of adult emperors, and were adorned with embroidered motifs of the twelve imperial insignia.

== Composition ==
The following is the standard composition of the full ceremonial attire of an adult emperor, including the kon'e:

- Benkan (冕冠, imperial crown): The emperor's exclusive crown, decorated with sun emblems and pendant tassels (ryū). See the article on Benkan for details.
- Ōsode (大袖, outer robe): A red outer robe with an open-front draped collar (垂領, tarikubi) and wide sleeves. Eight of the twelve imperial insignia are arranged on this robe. It was originally white.
- Kosode (小袖, inner robe): A red inner robe with a round-neck collar and straight tubular sleeves. No embroidery is present.
- Mo (裳, pleated skirt): A red pleated wrap skirt. Four of the twelve imperial insignia are arranged on it. Worn over the hakama. It was originally called hirami.
- Hakama (袴, outer trousers): White outer trousers.
- Shaku (笏, ivory scepter): A scepter made of ivory.
- Ju (綬, white sash): A white braided cord sash.
- Gyokuhai (玉佩, jade pendants): Jade pendants worn at the waist. Vassals wore one, but the emperor wore two.
- Shitōzu (襪, imperial socks): Socks made of brocade. Unlike modern tabi, they are bag-shaped with a rounded toe.
- Seki no kutsu (舄, imperial shoes): Red leather shoes. After the Heian period, black ones were also used.

As described above, the composition of the emperor's ceremonial attire is thought to have remained largely unchanged from the Heian period through the Sengoku period. However, some details did vary.

In Japan, the term ju refers to a white sash, but in China, it denoted a type of apron hanging from the waist. From the mid-Heian period onward, short sashes were customarily suspended in one or two strands from the waist.

As for the seki (imperial shoes), both red and black variants were used depending on the period, and it remains unclear which was originally standard. The pair believed to have belonged to Emperor Shōmu and stored in the Shōsōin are red. Two types of shitōzu (imperial socks) also existed: red-based and white-based.

== Twelve Imperial Insignia (Jūnishō) ==
Ōsode (大袖)

Eight of the twelve imperial insignia (jūnishō)—sun, moon, stars, mountain, dragon, fire, pheasant (kachū), and sōi—are embroidered on the red ōsode (outer robe). Each motif is expressed through embroidery. At the enthronement of Emperor Kōmyō in 1337 (Kenmu 4), the motifs were embroidered onto separate silk pieces and then applied to the garment. In relics from the early modern period, the robe belonging to Emperor Higashiyama has the motifs directly embroidered on the fabric, while that of Emperor Kōmei features the motifs embroidered on separate patches that were sewn onto the garment.

- Sun (日, nichi): Placed on the left shoulder, depicting a three-legged crow within a solar disc.
- Moon (月, getsu): Placed on the right shoulder, showing a laurel branch in a vase inside a lunar disc, flanked by a rabbit and a toad (hikigaeru).
- Seven Stars (七星, shichisei): Representing the Big Dipper (Hokuto Shichisei), placed on the upper back.
- Mountain (山, yama): Positioned on the front and back of the body of the robe.
- Dragon (龍, ryū): Large coiled dragons on the front and back of the sleeves; smaller dragons on the front and back of the body of the robe.
- Flame (火炎, kaen): Flame motifs.
- Pheasant (華蟲, kachū): A stylized design symbolizing a pheasant, positioned on the front and back of the torso.
- Sōi (宗彝, ancestral vessel motif): A symbolic design originating from ritual bronze vessels, typically depicting a tiger (valor) and monkey (filial piety).

Mo

The mo (裳, pleated skirt) shares the same red ground as the ōsode and is embroidered with the remaining four motifs of the twelve imperial insignia: seaweed (sō), rice grains (funmai), fu (斧, axe-shaped pattern), and Futsu (黻, a paired design resembling the Chinese character 亜).

== Differences between Japanese and Tang Chinese konben ==
There are several differences between the Japanese konben—a combination of the kon'e (imperial robe) and benkan (imperial crown)—and its Chinese (Tang dynasty) counterpart.

- In Tang China, the upper robe was black and the skirt (mo) was reddish, whereas in Japan, both garments were entirely red.
- In China, the motifs were expressed through woven patterns, while in Japan, they were embroidered.
- In China, the undergarment was a sheer white silk called baisha zhongdan (白紗中單, "white gauze inner robe"), whereas in Japan, a plain red kosode was used.
- In the Tang dynasty, the ju (綬) was a broad ornamental panel suspended from the waist, draping over the back of the skirt, unlike in Japan, where it functioned as a decorative cord belt tied around the waist. Moreover, Japanese imperial robes do not include elements such as the large belt (大帯), auxiliary belt (仮帯), or leather belt (革帯) found in Tang attire.
- Japanese kon'e did not include a front apron known as a bìxī (蔽膝).
- Japanese kon'e included hirami (pleated panels), which Chinese ceremonial robes did not.
- Japanese kon'e included hakama (trousers), which were not found in Chinese gǔnfú (袞服).
- Japanese kon'e did not include a ceremonial sword.
- The Japanese benkan lacked tǒukàng chōng'ěr (黈纊充耳, ear coverings made of dyed silk wadding), instead featuring a decorative "sun disc" (日形).
- The ryū (旒, dangling ornaments) on Japanese crowns were composed of yōraku (瓔珞, gilded or metal decorative pieces) and multicolored jewels or beads, whereas in Tang China, they consisted of uniform white beads strung together on cords.

The system of Twelve Imperial Insignia (jūnishō) for the konben in Japan was established during the reign of Emperor Saga. However, no envoys to Tang China (Kentōshi) were dispatched during his reign, and only two such missions were sent in the entire Heian period. This has led some scholars to suggest that the "Tang-style" elements of Japanese court dress were imagined rather than based on firsthand knowledge of contemporary Chinese customs.

== See also ==
- Raifuku
- Benkan
- Emperor of Japan
- Sokutai

== Bibliography ==
- Sekine, Masanao (1915). 即位礼大嘗祭大典講話 [Lectures on the Enthronement and Great Thanksgiving Rites] (in Japanese) (4th rev. ed.). Tokyo: Hōbunkan. doi:10.11501/953941.
- Ressei Zenshū Compilation Committee, ed. (1917). 列聖全集 宸記集 [Collected Works of the Imperial Ancestors: Imperial Diaries Collection] (in Japanese). Vol. 1. Retsusei Zenshū Hensankai. doi:10.11501/1914777.
- Hanawa, Hokinoichi, ed. (1926). 続群書類従 第10輯ノ下 公事部 再版 [Zoku Gunsho Ruijū, Vol. 10 (Public Affairs Section, Revised)] (in Japanese). Vol. 10. Zoku Gunsho Ruijū Kanseikai. doi:10.11501/936501.
- Imperial Museum, ed. (1929). 正倉院御物図録 第3輯 [Illustrated Catalog of the Treasures of Shōsōin, Vol. 3] (in Japanese). Vol. 3. Imperial Museum. doi:10.11501/8798670.
- Kuroita, Katsumi, ed. (1931). 新訂増補 国史大系 [Newly Revised and Enlarged Compendium of Japanese History] (in Japanese). Vol. 10. Kokushi Taikei Kankōkai. doi:10.11501/3431622.
- Niida, Noboru (1933). 唐令拾遺 [Supplement to the Tang Legal Code] (in Japanese). Tōhō Bunka Gakuin Tōkyō Kenkyūjo. doi:10.11501/1465856.
- Tōin, Kinkata (1938). Ōta, Tōshirō (ed.). 園太暦 巻三 [Entairyaku, Vol. 3] (in Japanese). Vol. 3. Taiyōsha. doi:10.11501/1920663.
- Kuroita, Katsumi, ed. (1939). 新訂増補 国史大系 [Newly Revised and Enlarged Compendium of Japanese History] (in Japanese). Vol. 22. Kokushi Taikei Kankōkai. doi:10.11501/3431635.
- Ueda, Mannen; Matsui, Kanji (1940). 大日本国語辞典 [Great Japanese Dictionary] (in Japanese). Vol. 2. Toyamabo. doi:10.11501/1870644.
- Historiographical Institute, Faculty of Letters, Tokyo Imperial University, ed. (1940). 大日本古文書 卷之二十五（補遺二） [Old Documents of Japan, Vol. 25 (Supplement II)] (in Japanese). Vol. 25 (Supplement II). University of Tokyo. doi:10.11501/1909266.
- Takeuchi, Rizō, ed. (August 1967). 續史料大成 増補 [Supplement to the Grand Collection of Historical Sources] (in Japanese). Vol. 18. Rinsen Shoten. doi:10.11501/2529857. ISBN 4-653-00464-1.
- Honda, Jirō (July 1977). 周礼通釈 [Annotated Rites of Zhou] (in Japanese). Vol. 1. Shūei Shuppan. doi:10.11501/12291956.
- Matsudaira, Norimasa (21 June 2006). 図説宮中柳営の秘宝 [Pictorial Guide to the Imperial Court Treasures] (in Japanese). Kawade Shobō Shinsha. ISBN 978-4309760810.
- Takeda, Sachiko; Tsuda, Daisuke (August 2016). 礼服 : 天皇即位儀礼や元旦の儀の花の装い [Ceremonial Attire: Imperial Enthronement Rites and New Year Ritual Dress] (in Japanese). Osaka University Press. ISBN 978-4-87259-551-2.
- Kondō, Yoshikazu (16 March 2019). 天皇の装束-即位式、日常生活、退位後 [Imperial Attire: Enthronement Ceremonies, Daily Life, and Post-Abdication] (in Japanese). Chūōkōronsha. ISBN 978-4121025364.
- Kyoto National Museum, ed. (October 2020). 御即位記念 特別展 皇室の名宝 [Special Exhibition for the Enthronement: Imperial Treasures] (in Japanese). Yomiuri Shimbun.
