= Raifuku =

Ceremonial court dress of ritsuryō Japan

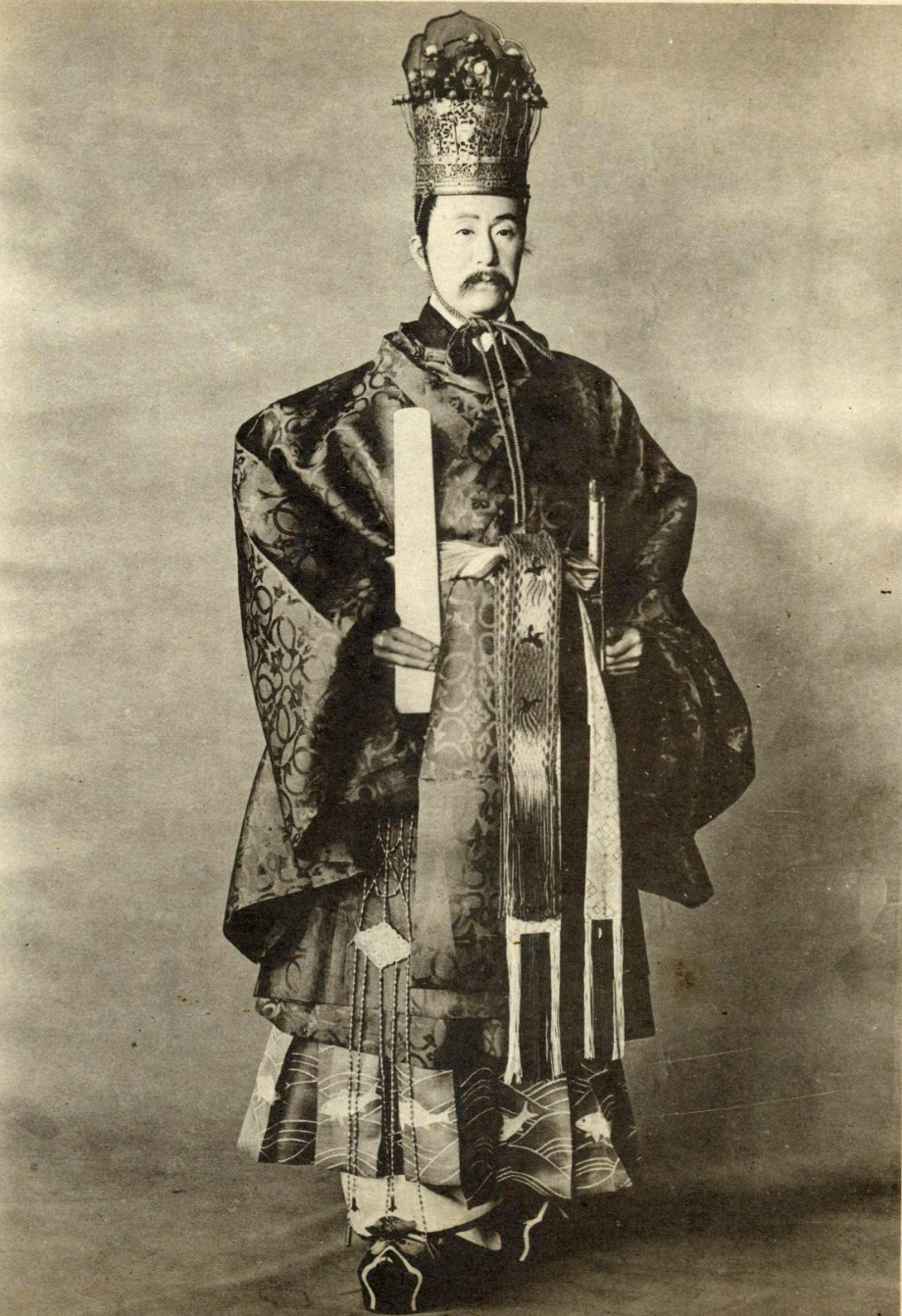
Male courtier's raifuku. The robe is thought to be a twill raifuku with a ringless arabesque pattern newly made in 1643.

Raifuku (礼服; old character form: 禮服󠄁) was a form of ceremonial court dress prescribed in Japan under the ritsuryō system. It was worn by the emperor, the crown prince, imperial princes, princes, officials of the fifth rank and above, and court women on important ceremonial occasions such as the New Year court audience and the enthronement ceremony.

Under the ritsuryō system, official dress was divided into categories such as raifuku, chōfuku and seifuku. Raifuku was the most formal of these ceremonial dress systems. Although it was developed under the influence of Tang-dynasty dress, its construction included many elements distinctive to Japan, such as the use of trousers and the hirami.

From the Heian period onward, as the annual New Year court audience declined, raifuku came to be used primarily as a special form of dress for enthronement ceremonies. In the medieval period, old garments were borrowed and the forms of the dress became increasingly confused. In the Edo period, a system was established in which raifuku kept in the imperial storehouses was lent out for use at the imperial palace. After the Meiji Restoration, the costume used in enthronement ceremonies was changed to the sokutai, and raifuku ceased to be worn in actual court ceremonies.

== Overview ==
Raifuku was the highest-ranking ceremonial dress within the official dress system of the ritsuryō state. In the clothing regulations of the Yōrō Code, official dress was divided into raifuku, chōfuku and seifuku, and raifuku was prescribed for major rites such as the great sacrifices, the Daijōsai, and New Year's ceremonies.

Male raifuku consisted of such elements as a ceremonial crown, robe, white trousers, hirami, corded sash, ribbon ornament, jade pendants, ivory tablet, socks and ceremonial shoes. The color and composition of the costume varied according to rank and status, visually expressing the hierarchy of the crown prince, imperial princes, princes, and officials. Female raifuku was likewise regulated according to the status of imperial princesses, princesses, and court women.

The emperor's raifuku was centered on the kon'e and benkan, and was distinguished from the raifuku of courtiers. Although courtier raifuku was influenced by Tang dress, it had distinctive Japanese features, including the use of trousers and hirami, the method of wearing the ribbon ornament, and the absence of a leather belt.

From the Heian period onward, as the New Year court audience fell into disuse, raifuku ceased to be worn in annual court ceremonies and came to be used chiefly for enthronement ceremonies. In the medieval period, old garments were increasingly borrowed, and by the late medieval period garments held as court property were lent for enthronement ceremonies. In the early modern period, garments preserved in the imperial storehouses were repaired and reused, while new sets were occasionally produced for particular enthronements.

== System ==
=== Raifuku, chōfuku and seifuku ===
The official dress system prescribed by the clothing regulations of the Yōrō Code distinguished among raifuku, chōfuku and seifuku. Raifuku was ceremonial dress worn for major rites such as the great sacrifices, the Daijōsai, and New Year's ceremonies. Chōfuku was official dress worn by ranked officials when attending court, while seifuku was chiefly the prescribed dress worn by unranked persons on official court occasions.

Tang China had a complex system of official dress, including mianfu, court dress, public dress, cap dress, pingjinze, ku-zhe and everyday court dress. By contrast, the Yōrō Code used raifuku, chōfuku and seifuku as its basic categories, with further distinctions by sex and by civil or military status. The emperor's raifuku resembled Tang mianfu, and the raifuku of courtiers resembled Tang court dress, public dress and cap dress, but in both cases the construction and details differed greatly. Japanese chōfuku is considered to have been broadly equivalent to Tang everyday court dress.

=== Male and female raifuku ===
Male raifuku was divided into civil-official and military-official forms. In civil-official raifuku, such elements as the ceremonial crown, robe, white trousers, hirami, ribbon ornament, jade pendants, ivory tablet, socks and ceremonial shoes were prescribed. As for color, the crown prince wore ōni yellow-red, while imperial princes, princes and officials used purple and scarlet according to rank.

Female raifuku was also regulated according to the status of imperial princesses, princesses and court women, and included such elements as the hōkei jeweled coiffure, robe, skirt, hirami, socks and ceremonial shoes. Female raifuku is thought to have disappeared by the end of the medieval period. In early modern enthronement ceremonies, women of the aristocracy wore what is commonly called the jūnihitoe rather than the ancient form of female raifuku.

=== Differences from Tang dress ===
Although the raifuku of the Yōrō Code was part of the dress system of a ritsuryō state influenced by Tang institutions, it was not a direct importation of Tang court dress. Formal Tang dress such as mianfu and court dress was fundamentally organized around the combination of an upper robe and a skirt-like lower garment. By contrast, Japanese imperial ceremonial robes and raifuku were constructed from a robe, trousers and hirami.

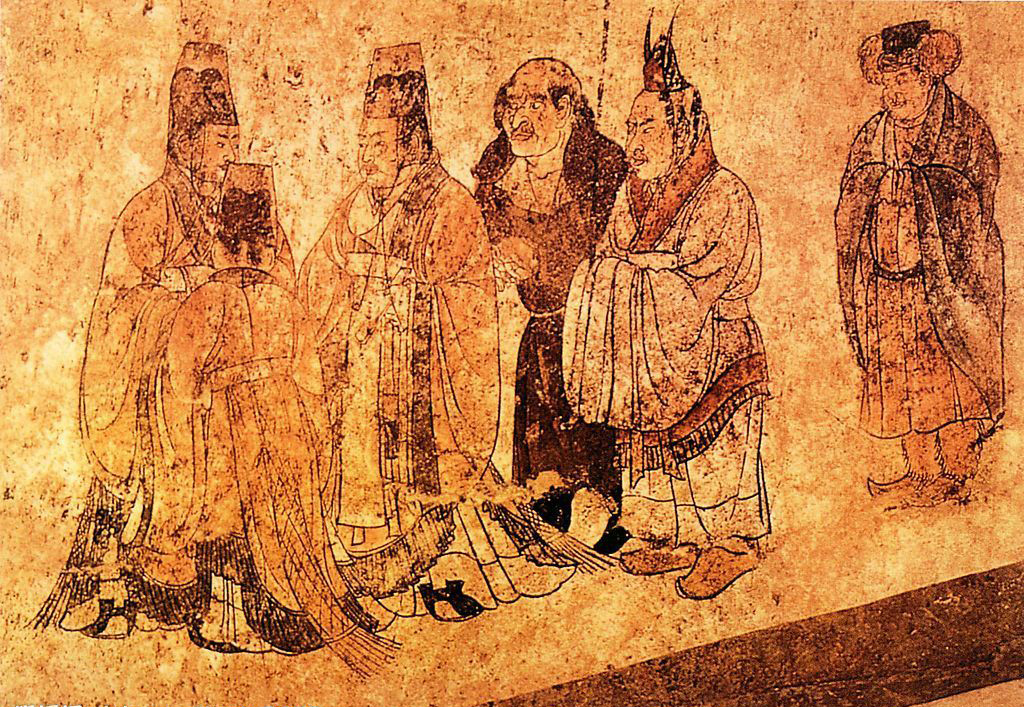
The guest-reception mural from the tomb of Prince Zhanghuai. The three figures on the left are Tang officials wearing court dress, while the figures on the right are foreign envoys.

According to the New Book of Tang, Tang court dress, or full dress, consisted on the upper body of a white gauze inner garment, over which was worn a round collar ornament known as quling fangxin, and then a red gauze unlined robe. (Note: The Chinese terms are 白紗中單, 曲領方心 and 絳紗單衣.) The collar and sleeve edges were black. On the lower body, a white skirt was worn, over which was placed a red skirt with black edging, and a red gauze knee-covering was suspended in front. In addition, the Tang ribbon ornament differed from the ribbon ornament of Japanese raifuku, functioning as a back-hanging ornament worn on the rear of the costume.

By contrast, Japanese raifuku was constructed by placing the hirami over white trousers. In Tang court dress, a skirt or lower garment was not worn over outer trousers in formal dress. Thus, while Japanese raifuku showed Tang influence in the upper body, it preserved older Japanese elements in the lower body, including forms traceable to the court dress of the Suiko period. It was also distinctive in its use of the ribbon ornament and in the absence of a leather belt.

== History ==
=== Before the establishment of the system ===
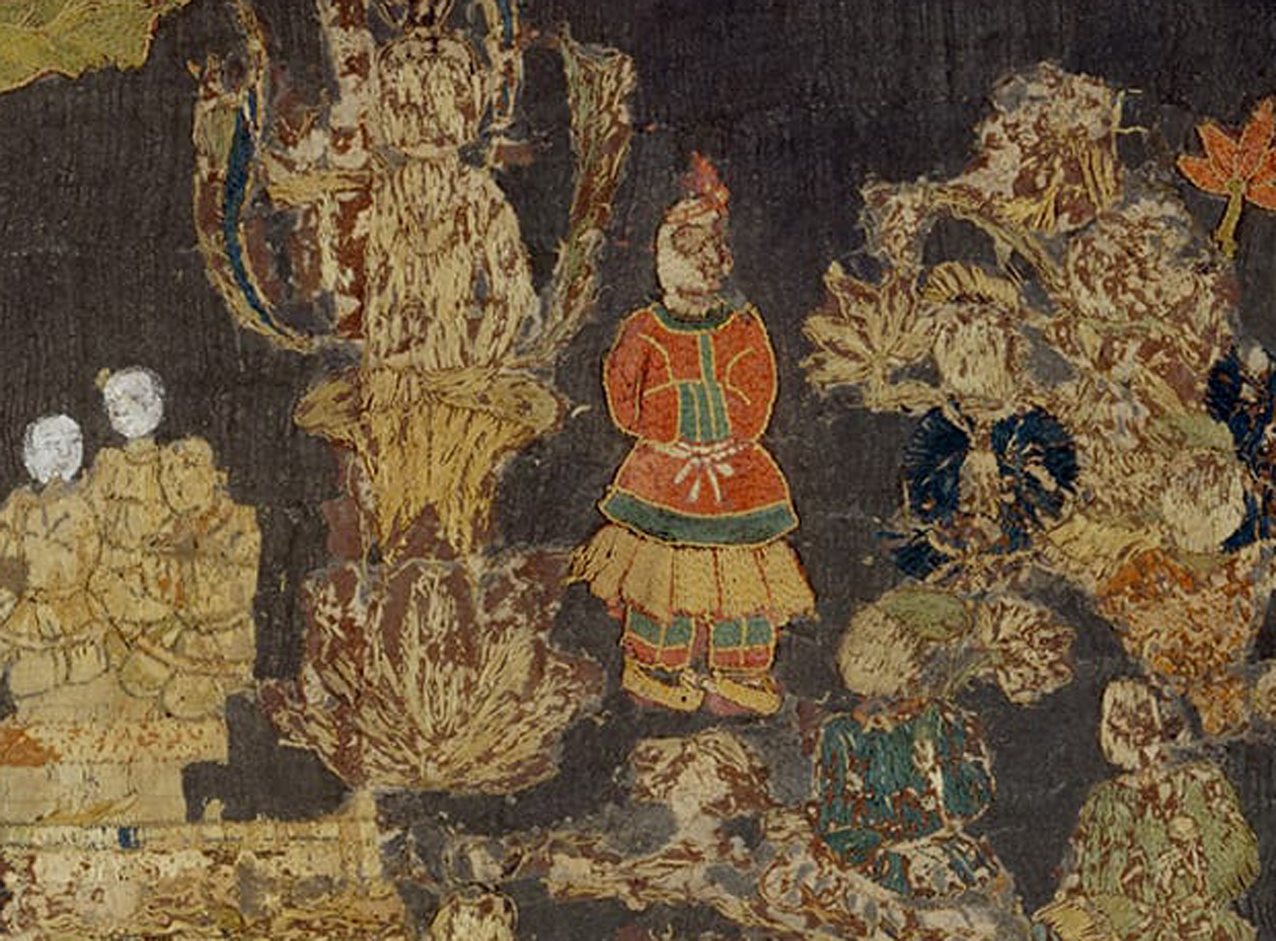
A male figure in the Tenjukoku Shūchō Mandala.

Although raifuku as a formal system was clearly established only after the Taihō Code, earlier Japanese court practice already included the use of special crowns and ornaments in ceremony. The account of Wa in the Book of Sui states that the king of Wa first made caps, fashioned them from brocade, and decorated them with gold and silver floral ornaments. This is thought to correspond to the establishment of the Twelve Level Cap and Rank System in 603.

The entry for the twelfth month of the eleventh year of Empress Suiko in the Nihon Shoki states that, together with the establishment of the Twelve Level Cap and Rank System, it was prescribed that uzu floral ornaments were to be worn on New Year's Day. The word, written 髻華 and also transcribed phonetically as 于孺 (uzu), referred to a floral ornament inserted into the hair or crown. Tayasu Munetake, in Fukushoku kanken, saw in the distinction between wearing uzu on New Year's Day and not wearing them on ordinary days the origin of the distinction between Japanese raifuku and chōfuku.

The Book of Sui also states that men of Wa wore qunru, with small sleeves, and that their shoes were lacquered and tied to the legs. In this context, ru is understood as an upper garment and qun as a skirt-like garment worn on the lower body. The pleated, short wrap-skirt-like garment worn over trousers by the male figure in the Tenjukoku Shūchō Mandala may be seen as a garment element leading to the later hirami.

In 605, Crown Prince Shōtoku is said to have ordered princes and officials to wear hirami. The hirami later became an important element of raifuku, but in 682 an edict prohibited imperial princes and all officials from wearing maemo, hirami, hagimomo and similar garments. This prohibition is understood as a temporary exclusion of older garment elements in the process of reorganizing dress in a Tang style.

Thus, before the Taihō Code, a systematic form of raifuku like that of later periods had not yet been established. Nevertheless, elements later associated with raifuku, such as crowns, uzu and hirami, were already present in the court dress of the Asuka period.

=== Taihō and Yōrō Codes ===
Raifuku appears clearly as an institution after the Taihō Code. The entry for New Year's Day in 702 in the Shoku Nihongi states that when the emperor appeared in the Daigokuden and received the court audience, imperial princes and officials of the rank of Dainagon and above wore raifuku for the first time, while princes and officials below them wore chōfuku. At this stage, wearers of raifuku were limited to imperial princes and officials of the rank of Dainagon and above, a narrower range than in later regulations.

The clothing regulations of the Taihō Code do not survive, so the detailed composition and color system of raifuku under the Taihō Code are not known. However, the account of Wa and Japan in the Old Book of Tang describes the dress of the envoy Awata no Mahito when he had an audience with Wu Zetian. According to this passage, Awata wore a jintoku crown, the top of which formed a flower spreading in four directions, and he wore a purple robe with a silk belt at the waist. (Note: The original reads: 冠進德冠，其頂爲花，分而四散，身服紫袍，以帛爲腰帶.)

Awata's crown resembled the jintoku crown but differed from it in having a floral ornament at the top, and is considered to have been of the same lineage as the ceremonial crown prescribed later by the Yōrō Code. The form of his purple robe, however, is debated. In the section on ceremonial dress in the Old Book of Tang, the red gauze robe of court dress is understood as a crossed-collar robe, while the robe of everyday court dress is understood as having a round collar. It is therefore difficult to determine whether Awata's purple robe should be regarded as a crossed-collar robe similar to the later large-sleeved robe of raifuku, or as a round-collar robe. Since Awata was not yet a Dainagon at the time of his mission, it is also possible that he wore a ceremonial crown together with chōfuku. One theory holds that, at the stage of the Taihō Code, the upper garment was a tubular-sleeved, sajin crossed-collar robe, with the wearer's right panel overlapping the left, like those seen in the male figures of the Takamatsuzuka Tomb murals, and that there was not yet a major formal distinction between raifuku and chōfuku.

The clothing regulations of the Yōrō Code later defined the raifuku system in greater detail. Although the text of the Yōrō Code itself has been lost, its contents are known from commentaries such as the Ryō no gige and Ryō no shūge. In the Yōrō clothing regulations, the distinction among raifuku, chōfuku and seifuku was set out, and dress was prescribed according to status, rank and sex for the crown prince, imperial princes, princes, officials, imperial princesses, princesses and court women. These Yōrō regulations became the basis of the raifuku system from the Nara period onward.

=== Nara period ===
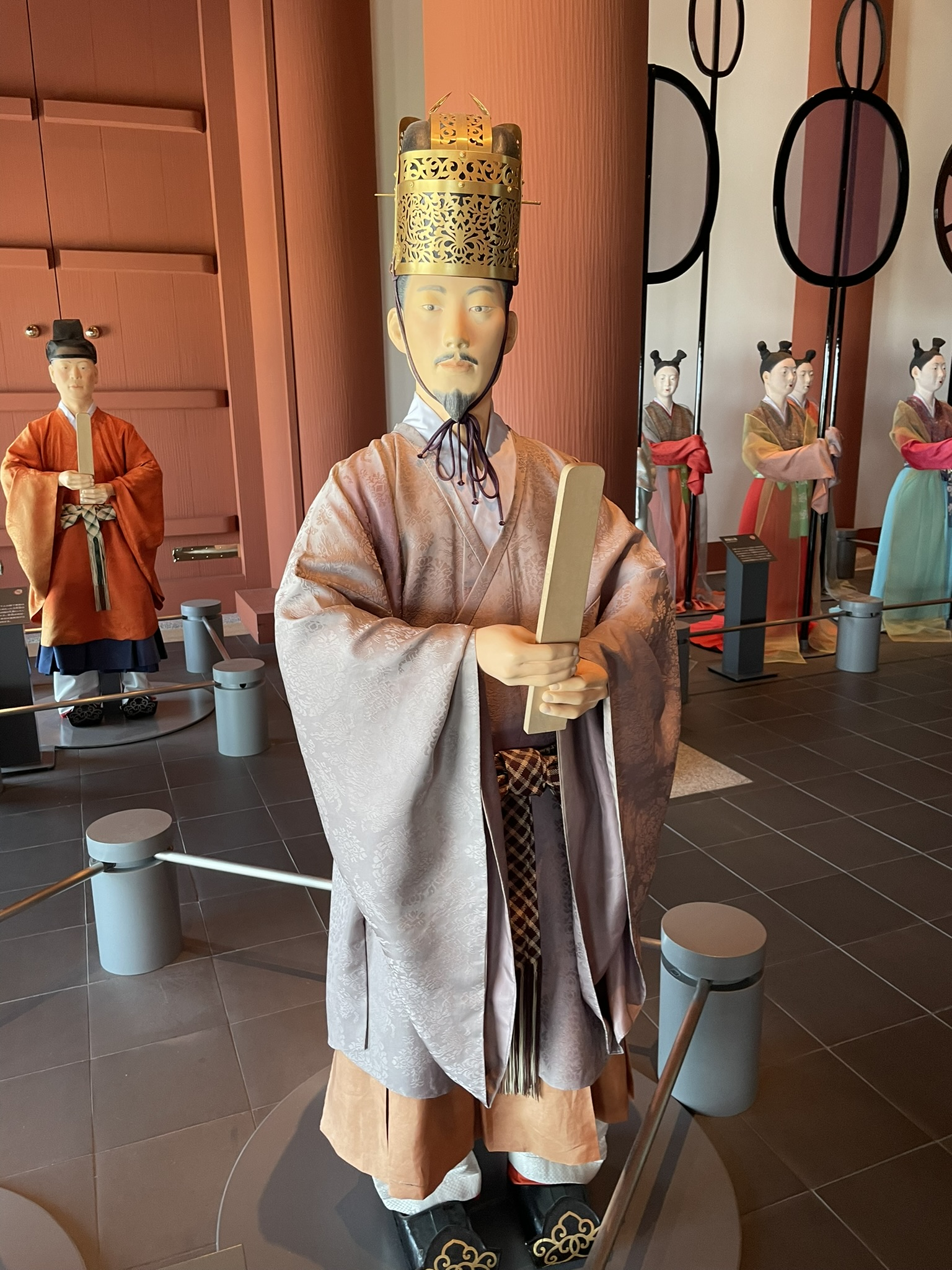
Reconstructed civil-official raifuku of the Nara period, Osaka Museum of History.

In the Nara period, the raifuku system based on the ritsuryō codes was used in court ceremony. The Shoku Nihongi records that in the first month of 715 the crown prince wore raifuku for the first time.

Taking civil-official raifuku as an example, its components included a ceremonial crown, robe, ivory tablet, white trousers, corded sash, gauze hirami, brocade socks, black leather ceremonial shoes, ribbon ornament and jade pendants. The robe corresponded to the later large-sleeved robe and had a crossed collar and wide sleeves. As for color, the crown prince wore ōni yellow-red; imperial princes and princes wore deep purple; and officials wore deep purple for the first rank, light purple for the third rank and above, deep scarlet for the fourth rank, and light scarlet for the fifth rank. This color hierarchy resembles the Tang color system for everyday court dress established in 630. (Note: The relevant passage reads: 貞觀四年八月十四日。詔曰。冠冕制度。以備令文。尋常服飾。未為差等。於是三品已上服紫。四品五品已上服緋。六品七品以綠。八品九品以青。婦人從夫之色.) However, Tang court dress did not have such a color hierarchy, and the reason why this system was adopted for Japanese raifuku remains unclear. The crown prince's ōni color was a distinctive Japanese color not found in Tang dress.

The Shōsōin preserves garments that may be related to Nara-period raifuku. For example, the robe known as the kesa-tsuki mokuran-zome ra no koromo has a crossed collar and wide sleeves like the later large-sleeved robe of civil-official raifuku, but it lacks the skirt-like lower panel seen on early modern large-sleeved robes. Although its original use is uncertain, its similarity to the emperor's large-sleeved ceremonial robe and its costly gauze material have led to the suggestion that it may have been related to the crown prince's raifuku.

The garment worn under the large-sleeved robe and corresponding to the later tubular-sleeved, round-collar small-sleeved robe is not listed in the Yōrō Code. It is said originally to have been called ōshi rather than kosode. Several tubular-sleeved, round-collar garments called ōshi are preserved in the Shōsōin. The Shōsōin also preserves unlined trousers of white silk with gussets, which may have been of the same form as the white trousers of raifuku.

The hirami was a short, pleated, wrap-skirt-like garment worn over white trousers. In the Nara period, the hirami was made of gauze; its color was deep purple for the crown prince, deep green for imperial princes and princes, and deep blue for officials. The hirami was a distinctive element of Japanese raifuku not found in Tang court dress, and its origin and the meaning of the character used for it have been the subject of debate.

In the tenth month of 741, it was ordered that ceremonial crowns, which had previously been made and supplied by the government, should henceforth be prepared by individuals themselves. It is not clear whether a similar rule applied to raifuku itself, but the regulation suggests that the procurement of items related to raifuku may have begun to shift from official supply to private preparation.

In the first month of 774, the color of the robe worn by persons of the second rank was changed from light purple to medium purple. This shows that the Nara-period raifuku system, while based on the Yōrō regulations, was subject to some modification in actual practice.

=== Heian period ===
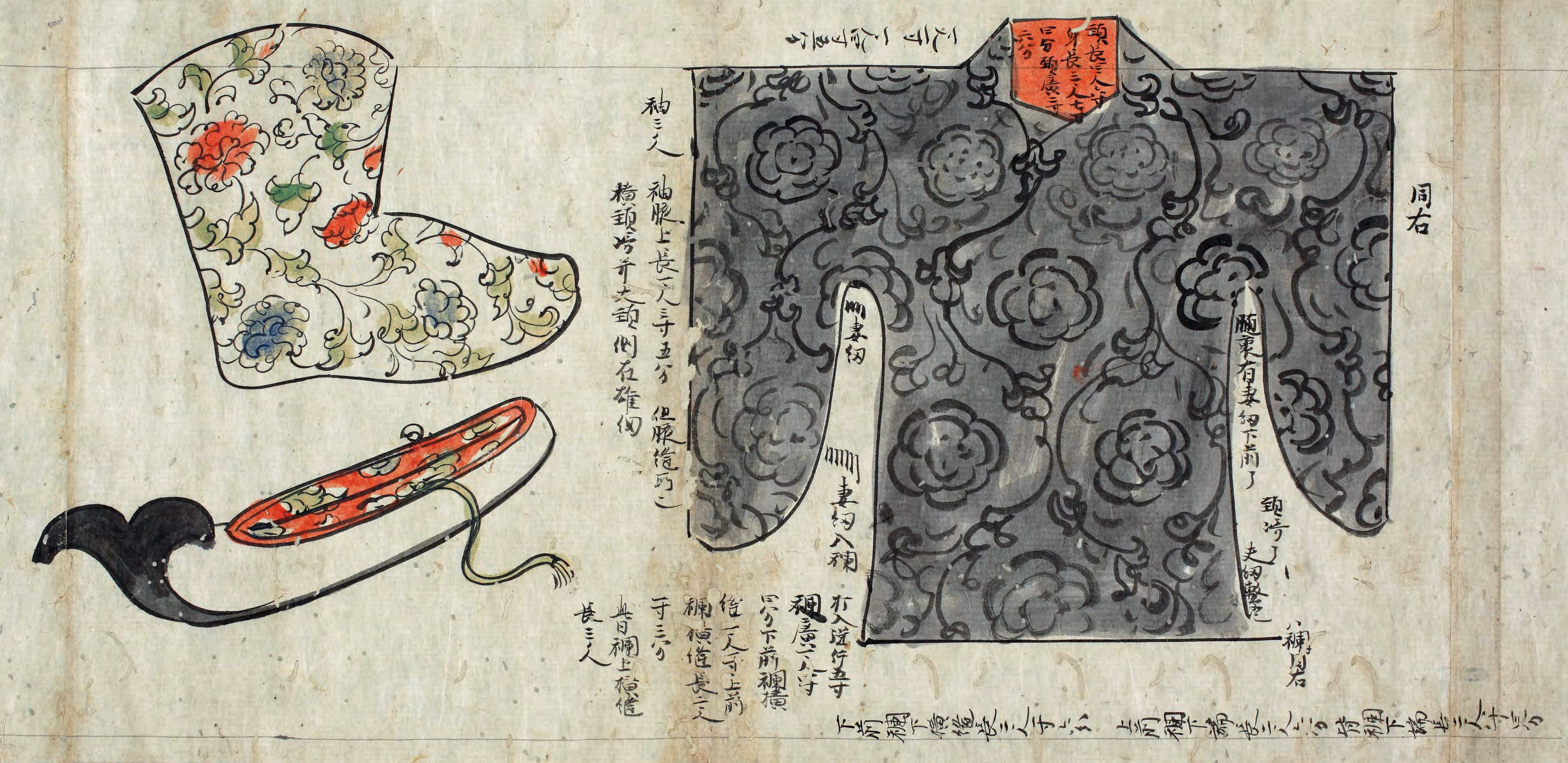
The large-sleeved robe, brocade socks and ceremonial shoes of late Heian-period raifuku, from the Sokui shōzoku ezu.

In the Heian period, raifuku continued to be used in important court ceremonies, but its production and procurement imposed a heavy burden. In the twelfth month of 823, under Emperor Junna, the court discussed suspending the use of raifuku at the New Year court audience (chōga) because of famine and hardship. The court nobles agreed that the wearing of raifuku might be suspended in general, but petitioned that the crown prince, councillors, persons of the third rank and above who were not councillors, and officials responsible for important ceremonial functions should continue to wear it as before. The "persons responsible for ceremonial functions" are thought to have been those who performed important roles at the New Year court audience, such as acting attendants and masters of ceremony.

The New Year court audience gradually fell into disuse and was last held in 993, under Emperor Ichijō. After this, raifuku was no longer a costume worn in annual court ceremony, but became a special form of dress used chiefly for enthronement ceremonies.

As opportunities to wear raifuku decreased, new garments were rarely made, and older examples were increasingly borrowed. Raifuku was preserved not only in aristocratic houses but also in storehouses of temples connected with the imperial family and the nobility. Those who needed raifuku for an enthronement ceremony sent messengers to search for suitable garments.

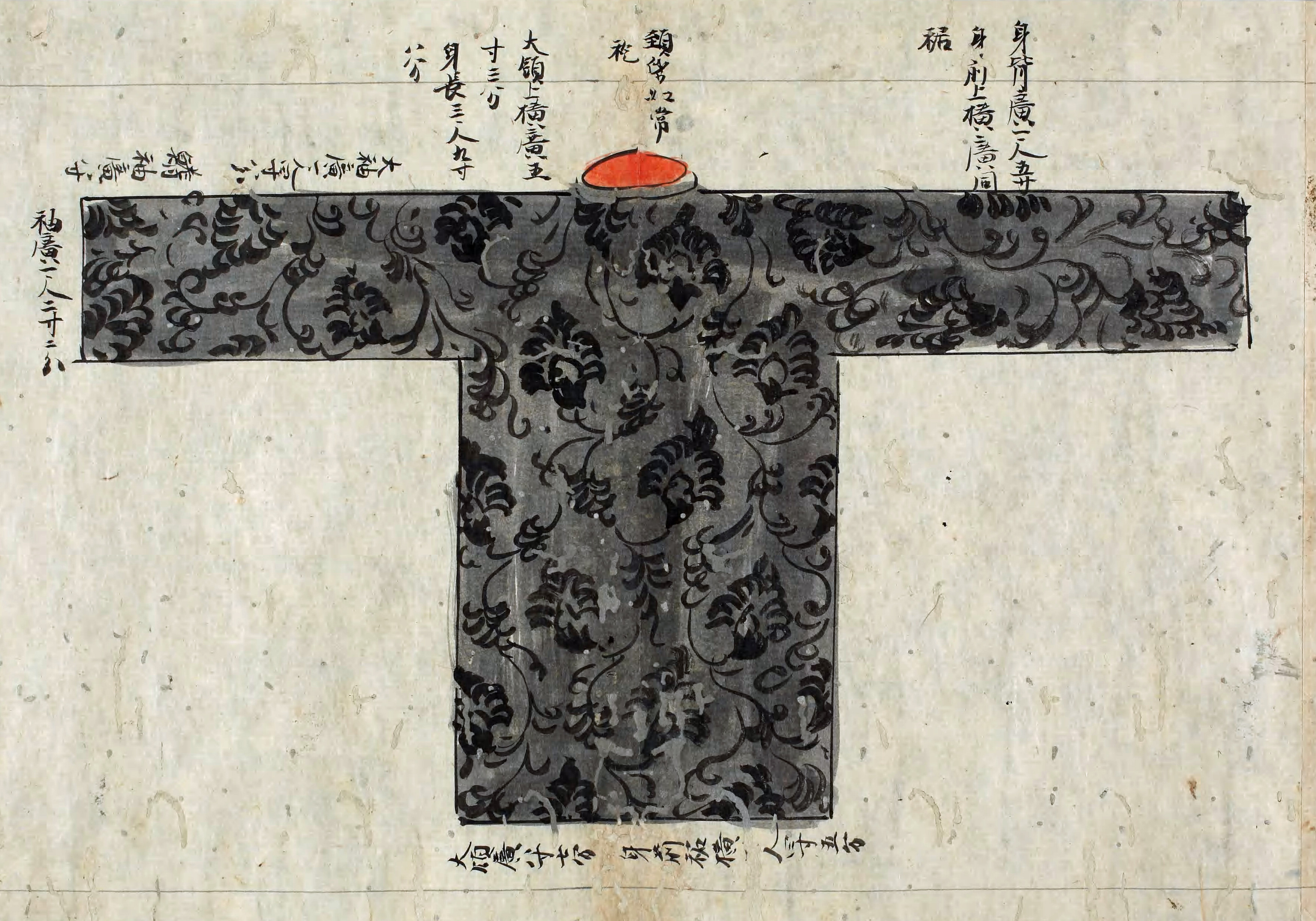
The small-sleeved robe of late Heian-period raifuku, from the Sokui shōzoku ezu.

As old garments came to be used, the rank-based rules for costume colors were no longer strictly observed. Although the color of raifuku had originally been prescribed according to status and rank, by the late Heian period garments of colors different from the regulations were sometimes worn. The Sankaiki records the colors and composition of raifuku used at enthronement ceremonies, showing that actual practice had already begun to diverge from the ritsuryō regulations.

Colors not prescribed by the Yōrō Code also came to be used for raifuku. In general, purple, the rank color of the third rank and above, was often used. As the purple court robe of the sokutai became black in appearance, kuro-tsurubami was also used alongside purple. In addition, kikujin, a color used in the early Heian period without regard to rank, was adopted for raifuku. There were also examples of dark blue being used as a variation of purple, and yellow as a variation of kikujin. The color kuro-kōrozen (blackened kōrozen) was also used.

From the late Heian period into the Kamakura period, items used by the emperor were managed and procured by the Kuraryō (Bureau of Palace Storehouses), while male aristocrats generally prepared their own raifuku. By contrast, female aristocrats were often granted raifuku by the court. From around the reign of Emperor Go-Suzaku in the mid-Heian period, the emperor's raifuku was inspected before the enthronement in a ceremony known as the "inspection of the raifuku" before the imperial presence. Male aristocrats' raifuku, however, was more susceptible to confusion in color and form because of the borrowing of old garments and the practical difficulties of procurement.

One manuscript derived from the ancestor of the so-called Bun'an Enthronement Implements Illustrations, the Sokui shōzoku ezu by Ozuki Kaneharu, dated 1370, depicts ceremonial crowns according to rank, as well as the large-sleeved robe, small-sleeved robe, skirt or hirami, ivory tablet, brocade socks, ceremonial shoes and ribbon ornament of civil-official raifuku. Recent research suggests that the ancestor of the Sokui shōzoku ezu depicted the enthronement of Emperor Konoe in 1141, making the work an important source for the appearance of ceremonial crowns and raifuku in the late Heian period. According to the illustrations, the large-sleeved robe of raifuku had a crossed collar and wide sleeves, while the small-sleeved robe had a round collar and tubular sleeves, corresponding to the form of early modern raifuku.

The entry for the twenty-seventh day of the seventh month of 1165 in the Sankaiki of Nakayama Tadachika describes the method of wearing raifuku at the enthronement of Emperor Rokujō, naming the various parts of the costume. The record includes items whose names differed from those in the Yōrō Code, as well as parts not listed in the code, and is therefore an important source for the details of late Heian-period raifuku.

The following table compares the main categories of components named in the Yōrō Code with those recorded in the Sankaiki.

Comparison of the parts of raifuku in the Yōrō Code and the Sankaiki
| Category | Yōrō Code | Sankaiki |
|---|---|---|
| Head | Ceremonial crown | Jeweled crown, lamp-wick ring, cap |
| Torso | Robe | Large-sleeved robe, small-sleeved robe, stiffened under-robe, small inner robe |
| Legs | White trousers, gauze hirami | Outer trousers, ōkuchi, skirt |
| Feet | Brocade socks, black leather ceremonial shoes | Brocade socks, socks, black leather ceremonial shoes |
| Belts and ribbons | Corded sash, ribbon ornament | Ribbon ornament, short ribbon ornament |
| Accessories | Ivory tablet, jade pendants | Sword, ivory tablet, fan, jade pendants |

The entry for the twenty-second day of the fourth month of 1180 in the Sankaiki also records the details of the raifuku worn by Fujiwara no Yorizane at the enthronement of Emperor Antoku. According to this account, the large-sleeved robe and the small-sleeved robe were blue-black, and bore nest-like roundel patterns about one shaku in diameter, approximately 30.3 cm (11.9 in). The skirt was made of gauze in a deep hanada blue and bore white roundels a little over one sun in diameter, approximately 3.3 cm (1.3 in). The nest-like roundel pattern was a circular motif surrounded by petal-like forms, and is thought to resemble the pattern on the large-sleeved robe depicted in the Sokui shōzoku ezu. The blue-black color of the large-sleeved robe and small-sleeved robe may have referred to kuro-tsurubami. The deep hanada color of the skirt or hirami is understood as a deep blue.

=== Kamakura, Nanboku-chō and Muromachi periods ===
In the Kamakura period, raifuku continued to be used chiefly for enthronement ceremonies. Since the late Heian period, it had more often been borrowed from old garments transmitted in aristocratic houses and temple storehouses than newly made.

During the Nanboku-chō period, many courtiers' raifuku were lost in the turmoil surrounding the Kenmu Restoration. At the enthronement of Emperor Sukō in 1349, four of the six outer masters of ceremony had newly made large-sleeved robes and small-sleeved robes. This indicates that it had become difficult to assemble the necessary number of garments by borrowing old examples alone.

In the late Muromachi period, the financial difficulties of the court and the effects of warfare made it difficult even to hold enthronement ceremonies. After the Ōnin War, Emperor Go-Kashiwabara was unable to hold his enthronement for many years after his accession, and the ceremony was finally performed on the twenty-second day of the third month of 1521. By this time, it had become difficult for aristocrats to procure raifuku for themselves, and examples appeared in which raifuku kept as public property in the imperial palace was borrowed for the ceremony.

Female raifuku is thought to have disappeared by the late Muromachi period. In early modern enthronement ceremonies, women of the aristocracy wore what is commonly called the jūnihitoe, rather than the ancient form of female raifuku.

=== Edo period ===
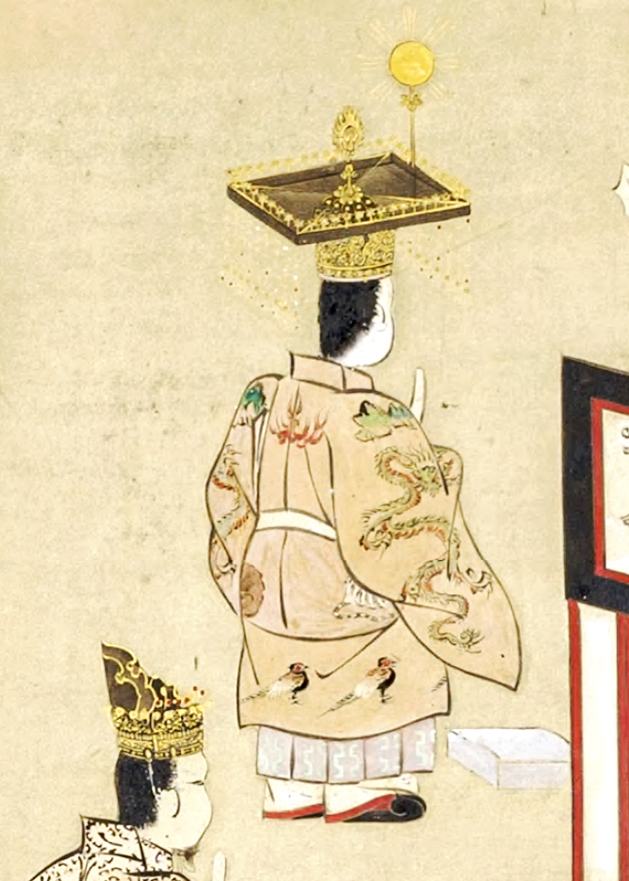
The crown prince wearing a nine-emblem benkan and raifuku, from the 1855 Chōga zu.

In the Edo period, courtiers' raifuku was stored in the imperial palace storehouses and was generally lent out for enthronement ceremonies under the management of the Yamashina family. It was possible to have raifuku newly made privately, but because its production required considerable expense and advanced technical skill, an early modern system developed in which garments kept in the official storehouses were repaired and reused.

At the enthronement of Empress Meishō in 1630, courtiers' raifuku was used mainly after repairing old garments. However, thirteen skirts, fourteen ribbon ornaments, thirteen pairs of socks and two sets of armor were newly made. In this period, the court dealt with enthronement ceremonies by reusing old garments transmitted from the medieval period and supplementing missing parts.

At the enthronement of Emperor Go-Kōmyō in 1643, fourteen sets of courtiers' raifuku were newly made. The large-sleeved robes and small-sleeved robes made at this time were all purple, and were woven in twill with such patterns as clove arabesques, bridle arabesques and ringless arabesques. Thereafter, however, in order to reduce expense, the emperor's raifuku was newly made for each reign, while courtiers' raifuku was generally not newly made and the garments in the official storehouses were used.

At the enthronement of Emperor Sakuramachi in 1735, courtiers' raifuku was newly made on a large scale for the first time in ninety-two years. The specifications are said to have been decided by Konoe Iehisa, who was then regent and grand minister, in consultation with the retired Emperor Nakamikado, as recorded in the entry for the twenty-seventh day of the sixth month of 1735 in the Munetake-kyō ki. The specifications were as follows.

Raifuku newly made in 1735
| | Color | Pattern | Number | Office |
|---|---|---|---|---|
| A | Purple | Clouds and peacock | 1 robe | Inner master of ceremony |
| B | Purple | Mandarin-duck roundels | 2 robes | Outer master of ceremony |
| C | Purple | Arabesque lozenges | 1 robe | Outer master of ceremony |
| D | Kikujin | Birds in roundels | 1 robe | Imperial prince's deputy |
| E | Kikujin | Birds in roundels | 1 robe | Imperial prince's deputy |
| F | Kikujin | Mandarin-duck roundels | 1 robe | Outer master of ceremony |
| G | Kikujin | Arabesque lozenges | 2 robes | Outer master of ceremony |
| H | Light purple | Chinese-flower arabesque | 2 robes | Acting attendant |
| I | Light purple | Arabesque lozenges | 2 robes | Minor counselor |
| J | Suō (sappanwood red) | Chinese-flower arabesque | 1 robe | Master of ceremony |

There are few sources describing the patterns of medieval raifuku, but records such as the Sankaiki, Sanemikyō ki and Jōwa gosokui ki are thought to have been used as references when the specifications for the 1735 garments were decided. In the Edo period, courtiers' raifuku in the official storehouses was newly made on a large scale only twice, in 1643 and 1735, although the raifuku of the inner master of ceremony was sometimes newly made at private expense.

=== After the Meiji Restoration ===
After the Meiji Restoration, the costume used in enthronement ceremonies was changed from raifuku to sokutai. As a result, raifuku ceased to be a costume used in actual court ceremonies.

The Kyoto Imperial Palace preserves raifuku used in early modern enthronement ceremonies, including garments associated with the emperors from Emperor Go-Sai through Emperor Kōmei. These surviving examples are important materials for understanding the form of raifuku in enthronement ceremonies before the modern period.

== The origin and meaning of hirami ==
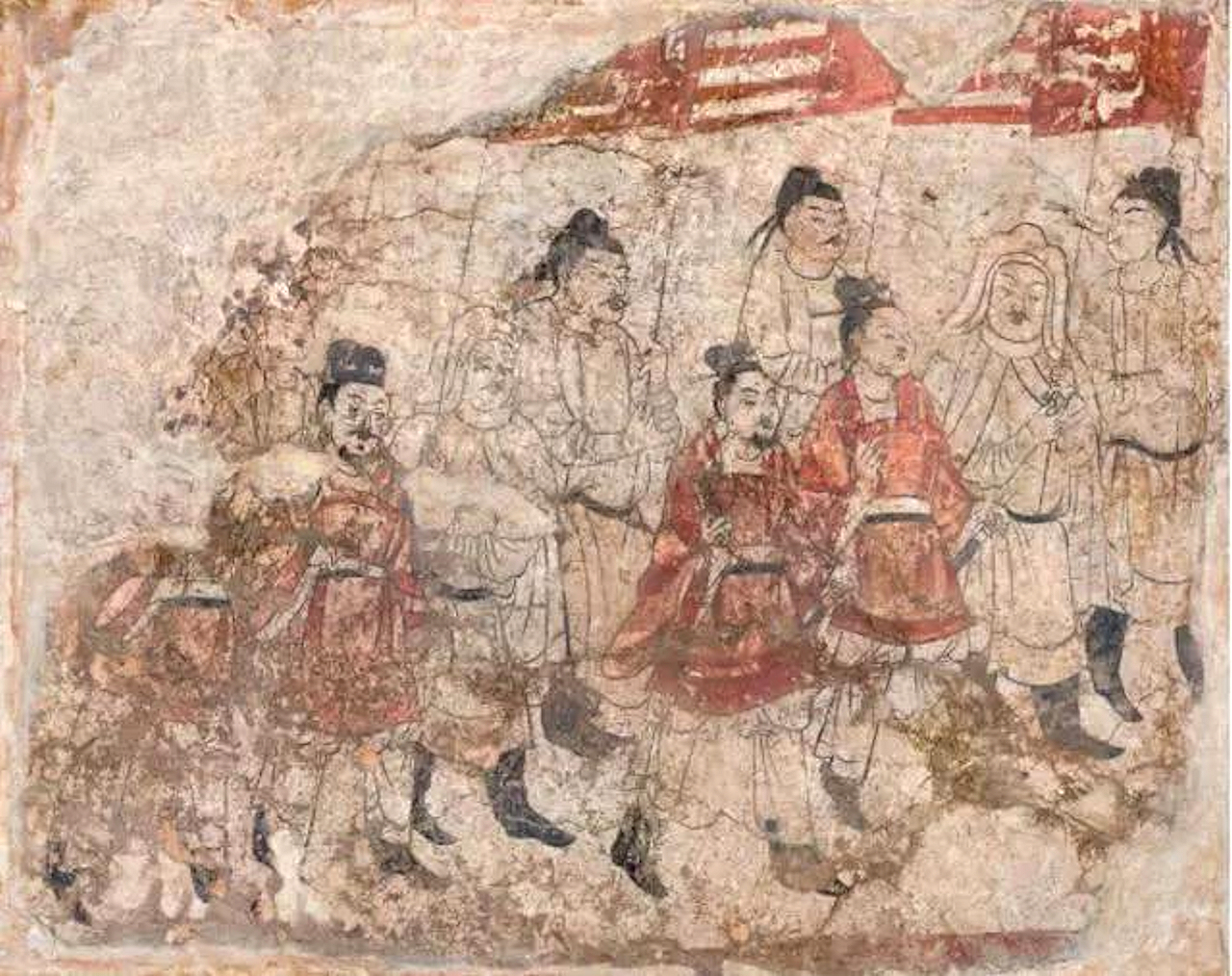
Ku-zhe depicted in the mural of the tomb of Li Shou in Tang China. The red upper garments worn by the two central figures are zhe.

The hirami was, in Japan, a short, pleated, wrap-skirt-like garment. In raifuku, it was worn over trousers. The earliest textual occurrence is in the entry for the first day of the intercalary seventh month of 605 in the Nihon Shoki, which states that the crown prince ordered princes and officials to wear hirami. The crown prince referred to here was Prince Shōtoku, and the passage shows that the wearing of hirami was prescribed at court during this period.

The entry for the fourth day of the eleventh month of 675 also states that garments including robes, trousers, hirami, waist belts, leg bindings, desks and staffs were bestowed on Prince Takechi and officials of the rank of Shōkin and above. This indicates that the hirami was regarded as a part distinct from robes and trousers. On the other hand, an edict of the twenty-eighth day of the third month of 682 prohibited imperial princes and all officials from wearing maemo, hirami, hagimomo and similar garments. This prohibition is understood as a temporary exclusion of older garment elements in the process of reorganizing court dress in a Tang style.

The hirami subsequently reappeared as a component of raifuku under the Taihō Code. The Ryō no gige explains that "the hirami is something added over the trousers; therefore it is commonly called ku-zhe." (Note: The original reads: 謂。褶者。所以加袴上。故俗云袴褶也.) However, the zhe in Tang ku-zhe referred to a short upper garment, not to a skirt-like garment of the Japanese type.

The commentary by Yan Shigu on the Jijiupian explains zhe as the outermost of layered garments: "Its form is like a robe, but the body is short and the sleeves are wide; one explanation says that it is a sajin robe, with the wearer's right panel overlapping the left." (Note: The original reads: 褶，謂重衣之最在上者也。其形若袍，短身而廣袖。一曰左衽之袍也.) This description also shows that in China zhe was a short upper garment and differed in form from the Japanese hirami.

The Ryō no shūge, citing an older commentary, states that the hirami resembled a woman's mo, or skirt, and that the character 褶 was read as hiraobi. (Note: The original reads: 古記云。褶謂似婦人裳也。褶訓枚帯也.) This suggests that the garment may originally have been called hiraobi, a word that later shifted phonetically to hirami, and that the character 褶 was then applied to it. As a result, a divergence may have arisen between the Chinese meaning of zhe and the Japanese meaning of hirami.

The Chinese dictionary Shiming explains zhe as meaning to layer or to cover from above. (Note: The original reads: 褶，襲也，覆上之言也.) However, the explanation of zhe from the Shiming quoted in the Wamyō Ruijushō reads "to cover over the trousers", adding the character for trousers, which is not found in the received text of the Shiming. It is unclear whether the text of the Shiming seen by Minamoto no Shitagō already included this character, or whether it was supplemented on the basis of the explanation in the Ryō no gige. If the former was the case, then the manuscript tradition of the Shiming transmitted to Japan may already have understood zhe as a garment worn over trousers.

The origin of the Japanese hirami remains obscure. Chinese ku-zhe is attested at least by the Later Han or Three Kingdoms period, since the term occurs in the Jiangbiao zhuan quoted in the biography of Lü Fan in the Wu section of the Records of the Three Kingdoms. It was originally described as lowly clothing worn by hunters and soldiers, and was associated with lower officials, soldiers and attendants.

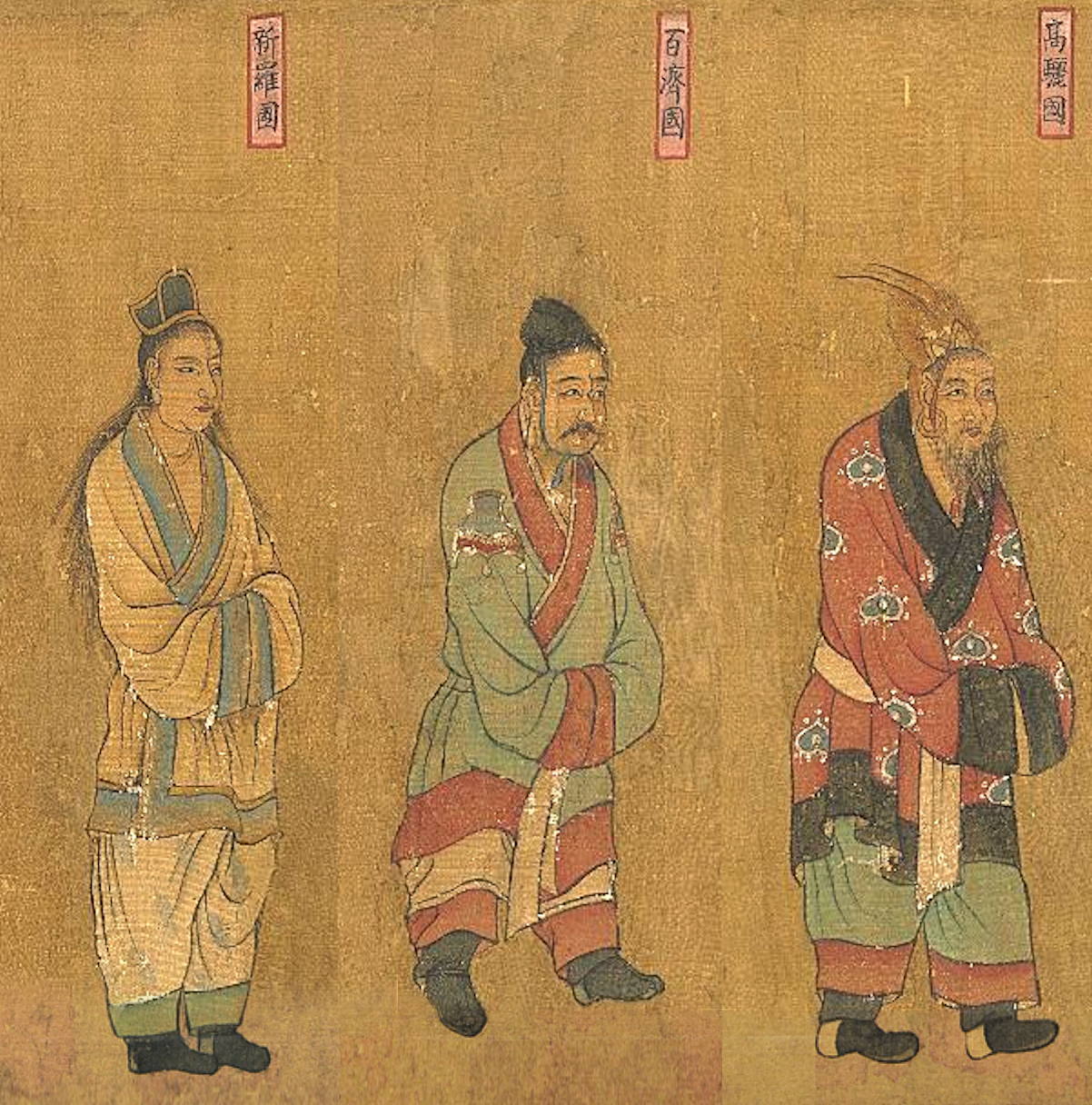
Envoys of Goguryeo, Baekje and Silla in Yan Liben's Portraits of Periodical Offering.

In the guest-reception mural of the tomb of Prince Zhanghuai, the garment of the second envoy from the right has an ornament near the hem of the upper garment that has sometimes been seen as resembling a hirami. Since the figure wears a feathered crown, he has been identified by some scholars as an envoy of Goguryeo. However, because Goguryeo fell in 668 and the tomb was constructed around 708, others have interpreted the figure as an envoy of Silla. There is also a theory that he represents a Japanese envoy, but this view has been questioned because it does not agree with the Old Book of Tang description of Awata no Mahito's crown as having a floral ornament. Another theory identifies the figure as an envoy of Balhae.

It has also been pointed out that the guest-reception mural was probably not a depiction of a single actual scene of foreign envoys coming to court, but was based on earlier paintings of foreign envoys. If so, a chronological gap between the construction of the tomb and the model painting need not be considered contradictory.

One possible model is Yan Liben's Portraits of Periodical Offering, in which the envoy of Gaoli, or Goguryeo, closely resembles the figure in the tomb mural. However, neither the Goguryeo envoy nor the envoys of Baekje and Silla in that work wear a skirt-like garment resembling a hirami. The Afrasiab murals in Samarkand also depict figures thought to be Korean envoys wearing feathered crowns, but no hirami appears there either.

In Japan, during a medicinal hunt at Uda in 611, persons of the Greater and Lesser Virtue ranks in the Twelve Level Cap and Rank System wore gold ornaments, those of the Greater and Lesser Benevolence ranks wore leopard-tail ornaments, and those of the Greater Propriety rank and below wore bird-tail ornaments in their uzu. It is therefore possible that early Japanese envoys to Tang China wore crowns with bird-tail uzu ornaments. However, the ornament near the hem in the guest-reception mural may not have been a skirt-like hirami at all, but rather a hem edging, or zhuàn (襈), on the upper garment.

== Components of men's raifuku ==
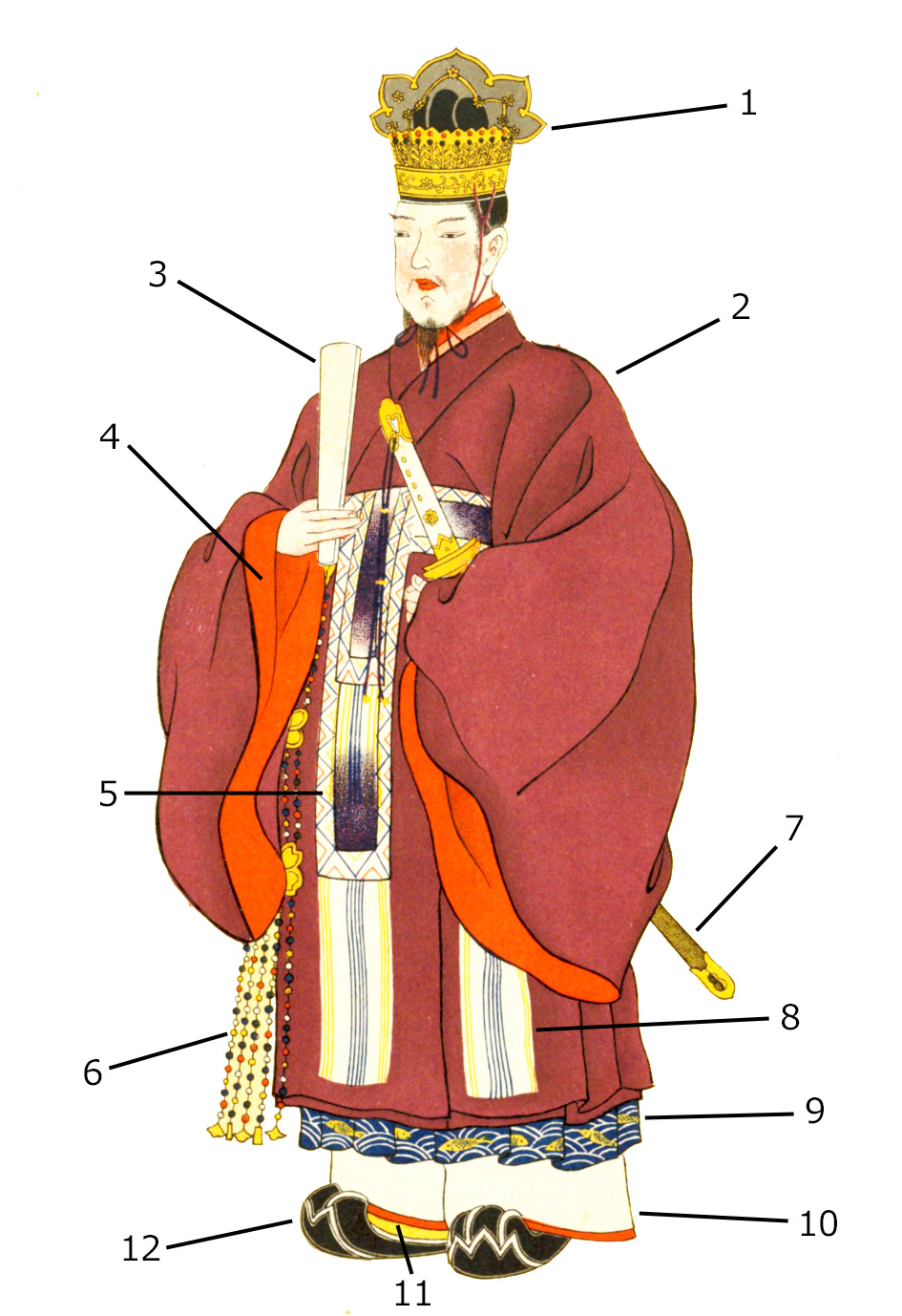
Diagram of the components of civil official raifuku.

The following describes the main components of civil official raifuku. The numbers correspond to those in the diagram. Under the Yōrō Code's Dress Statute, civil official raifuku consisted of such elements as the ceremonial crown, robe, white trousers, gauze hirami, corded belt, ribbon ornament, jade pendants, ivory shaku, brocade socks, and black leather shoes. For the emperor's ceremonial crown and robe, see benkan and kon'e, respectively.

1. Ceremonial crown (礼冠, raikan): See raikan.
2. Ōsode (大袖): The main upper robe, corresponding to the "robe" prescribed in the Yōrō Code. It had a crossed collar (tarikubi) and wide sleeves, and was worn in the standard Japanese manner, with the left panel overlapping the right. Its color corresponded to the wearer's rank: the crown prince wore ōni yellow-red, those of the first rank wore deep purple, princes of the second rank and below through the fifth rank and officials of the second and third ranks wore light purple, fourth-rank officials wore deep scarlet, and fifth-rank officials wore light scarlet.
3. Ivory tablet (笏, shaku): In raifuku, the tablet was a geshaku, that is, an ivory shaku.
4. Kosode (小袖): A round-collared, tubular-sleeved garment worn beneath the ōsode. It was distinct from the later everyday garment known as kosode; the name simply referred to the fact that its sleeves were smaller than those of the ōsode. The term kosode does not appear in the Yōrō Code, but late Heian-period records mention a kosode together with the ōsode.
5. Corded belt (絛帯, kumino obi): A long flat corded belt with tassels at the ends, made of white ground with patterns in colored threads. It was tied around the waist over the ōsode.
6. Jade pendant (玉佩, gyokuhai): A jade ornament worn at the waist by persons of the third rank and above. Normally a single pendant was suspended from the corded belt so that it hung near the left knee; only the emperor wore pendants on both sides.
7. Decorative sword (飾太刀, kazari-tachi): A ceremonial tachi worn as part of formal dress.
8. Ribbon ornament (綬, ju): A short flat cord with tassels, made of white ground with patterns in colored threads. It was tied and suspended at the chest.
9. Hirami (褶): A short pleated, wraparound skirt-like garment worn over the trousers and beneath the kosode. In the Yōrō Code, it was made of gauze. The crown prince wore deep purple, imperial princes and princes wore deep green, and courtiers wore deep blue.
10. Outer trousers (表袴, ue no hakama): The lower-body garment corresponding to the white trousers of the Yōrō Code. In the medieval and early modern periods, the same type as that used with sokutai is said to have been worn.
11. Socks (襪, shitōzu): Brocade socks in white, red, purple, or other colors. Unlike tabi, they were bag-shaped and rounded at the toes.
12. Shoes (舄, seki; 沓, kutsu): Black leather ceremonial shoes, called kurikawa no kutsu (烏皮舄) in the Yōrō Code. Their toes were shaped like three connected peaks.

From the medieval period onward, layers such as the hitoe, an unlined robe, and the akome, an inner robe, similar to those worn with sokutai, were sometimes added. Because the kosode had tubular sleeves, however, its sleeves were sometimes opened or unstitched for wearing.

== Components of female raifuku ==
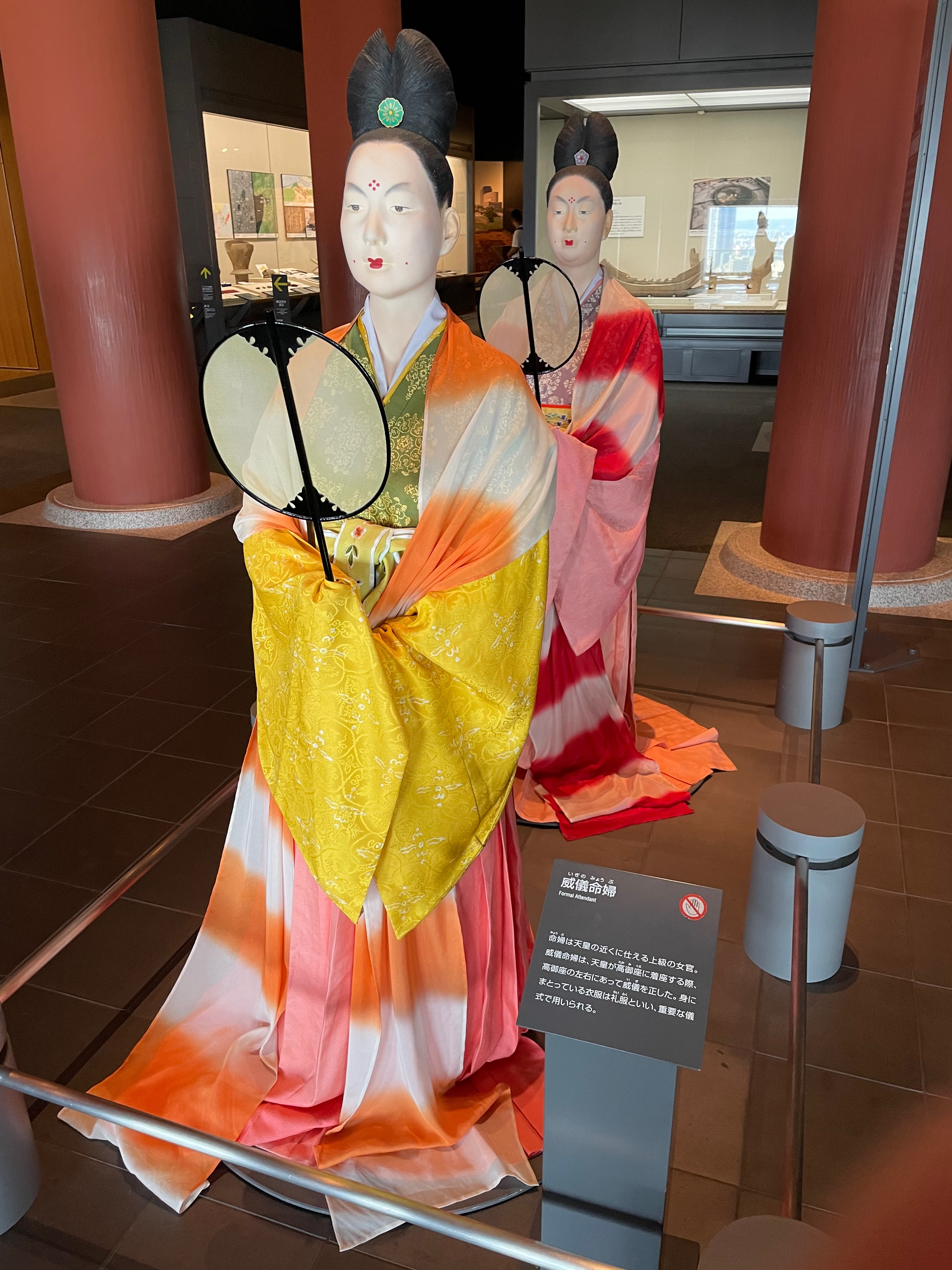
Reconstructed Nara-period raifuku of an igi no myōbu, Osaka Museum of History.

The clothing regulations of the Yōrō Code also prescribed the composition and colors of female raifuku according to the status of imperial princesses, princesses and court women. Whereas male raifuku was centered on such components as the ceremonial crown, robe, white trousers, hirami, ribbon ornament and jade pendants, female raifuku included the hōkei jeweled coiffure, robe, supplementary sash, skirt, hirami, socks and ceremonial shoes.

Hōkei jeweled coiffure
A coiffure ornamented with gold and jewels. The Ryō no gige explains that it was called hōkei because the cord of the coiffure was decorated with gold and jewels. It is thought that, on ceremonial occasions, false hair was used and further adorned with gold, silver, pearls and jewels.

Robe, or large-sleeved robe
The principal upper garment. Its color was prescribed according to status and rank: imperial princesses, princesses of the first rank and court women of the first rank wore deep purple; princesses of the fifth rank and above and court women of the third rank and above wore light purple; and court women of the fourth rank wore deep scarlet, among other distinctions. In later records, it is also called a large-sleeved robe.

Supplementary sash (soe-obi)
A sash used with female raifuku. The combinations of colors were prescribed according to status, including imperial princesses and princesses of the third rank and above, princesses and court women of the fourth rank, and princesses and court women of the fifth rank.

Skirt (kun)
A pleated skirt-like lower garment. It was decorated with dyed patterns, and combinations of colors such as suō, purple and green were used according to status.

Hirami
A garment worn on the lower body together with the skirt. Imperial princesses and princesses wore light green, while court women wore light blue.

Socks (shitōzu)
Brocade socks. Like the socks used with male raifuku, they were not split-toe tabi but bag-shaped socks with rounded toes.

Ceremonial shoes (seki or kutsu)
Formal shoes. Those of the third rank and above wore green shoes decorated with gold and silver, while those below that rank wore black shoes decorated with silver.

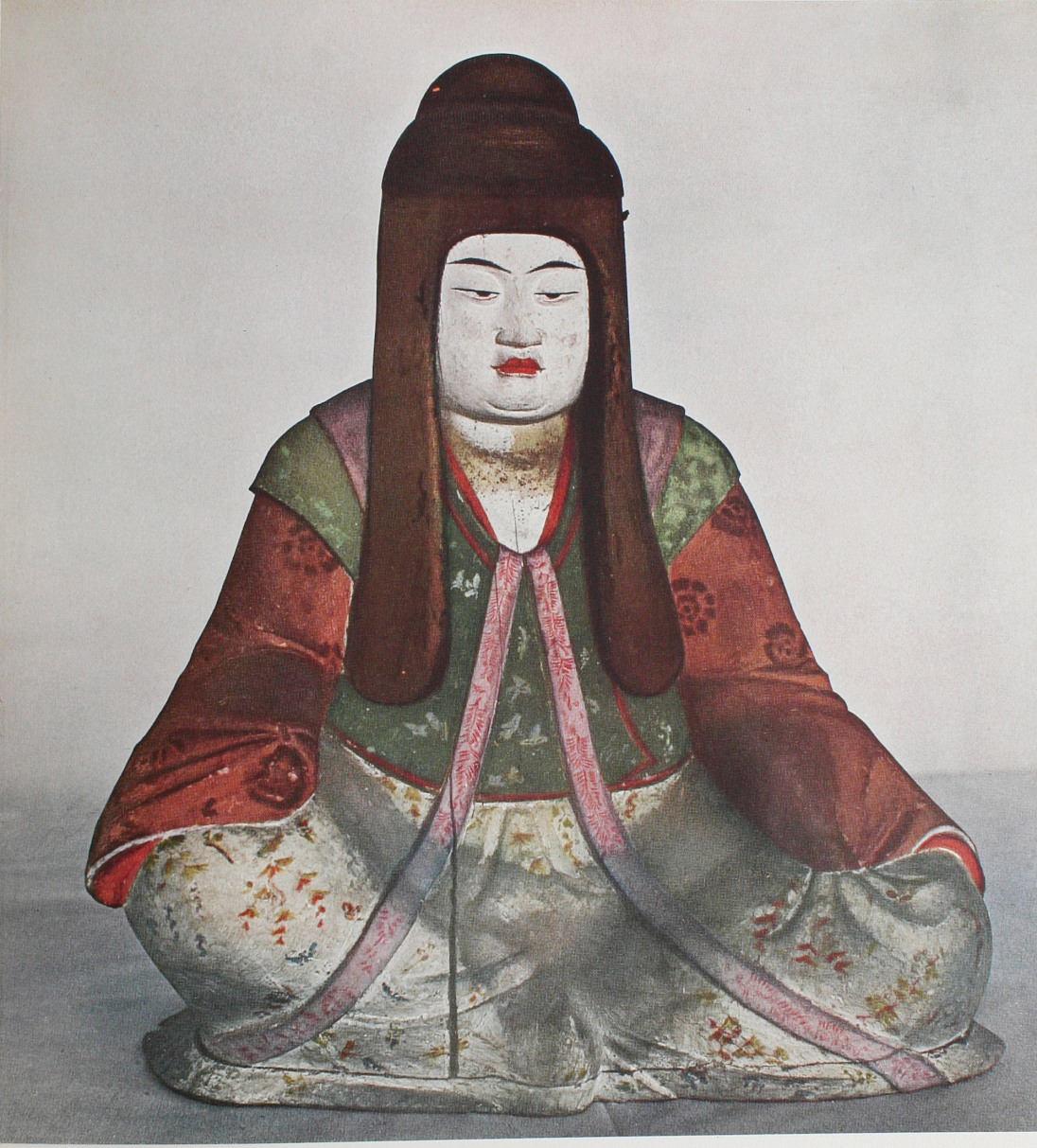
Statue of Nakatsu-hime no Mikoto at Yakushi-ji, Heian period.

Among the Hachiman triad preserved at Yakushi-ji, the statue of Nakatsu-hime no Mikoto has been noted as an example showing dress close to ancient female raifuku. The statue is represented wearing a large-sleeved robe and skirt, with a sleeveless sajin haishi—that is, one wrapped with the wearer's right panel overlapping the left—and a long scarf-like cloth (hire) layered over them; this costume has been interpreted as corresponding broadly to raifuku from the early Nara period to around the Engi era. The same discussion also notes, however, that the colors of the costume do not correspond to the rank colors of the period and that the polychromy may include later elements. It is therefore more appropriate to treat the statue as an art-historical reference example rather than as direct evidence for the institutional form of female raifuku.

The Kitayama-shō gives a concrete description of female raifuku in the Heian period. According to this text, female raifuku did not have a lined gusset (袷襠), and did not use a long scarf-like cloth (hire) draped around the shoulders or neck. The sleeves were three shaku and five sun wide, or approximately 106 cm (42 in). The skirt sash worn on the lower body combined purple and green cloth, and was sewn together at both ends in a form resembling the decorative cords used on canopied platforms and similar furnishings. As for the head ornament, the text states that a hairpin (kanzashi) was not used, and that the ornament called 纂 was used instead; this served as a rank insignia indicating the status of the wearer. The shoes are described as resembling slip-on footwear into which the feet were inserted, with the toe portion divided in two and decorated with silver leaf.

Female raifuku is thought to have disappeared by the end of the medieval period. In early modern enthronement ceremonies, women of the aristocracy wore what is commonly called the jūnihitoe rather than the ancient form of female raifuku.

== Raifuku of empresses regnant and empresses consort ==
The raifuku of an empress regnant, that is, a female emperor, differed from the raifuku of ordinary aristocratic women and was treated as a form of the emperor's raifuku. Its form, however, differed from the kon'e worn by male emperors.

The Shōsōin documents do not contain any clear record concerning the raifuku of an empress regnant. However, the entry for the fourth day of the seventh month of 1036 in the Heian-period diary Doyūki (土右記), by Minamoto no Morofusa, contains a description of the raifuku of an empress regnant kept in the Kuraryō (Bureau of Palace Storehouses). According to the Doyūki, the large-sleeved robe, small-sleeved robe and skirt-like components of the raifuku of an empress regnant were all made of white twill and bore no embroidered motifs. On this basis, later scholars have understood the raifuku of empresses regnant as lacking the Twelve Symbols seen on the kon'e of male emperors.

The Doyūki also records that white gauze was sewn beneath the small-sleeved robe, in a form resembling the skirt or train of a male emperor's ceremonial dress. For this reason, the raifuku of an empress regnant is thought not to have been in a form resembling the later jūnihitoe, but to have had a structure close to the hirami found in raifuku since the Nara period.

The empress regnant closest in time to the period described in the Doyūki was Empress Kōken, who later reascended the throne as Empress Shōtoku. For this reason, it has been suggested that the raifuku of an empress regnant described in the diary may have been the raifuku worn by Empress Kōken or Empress Shōtoku. If so, the raifuku of empresses regnant in the Nara period would also have been based on plain white, without embroidered motifs.

In the early modern period, raifuku for empresses regnant was used at the enthronements of Empress Meishō and Empress Go-Sakuramachi.

The raifuku of an empress consort used a costume with pheasant motifs on a blue ground, understood as an adoption of the Tang Chinese diyi (翟衣). The white twill robe used in the ceremony for appointing an empress consort was not regarded as raifuku, at least from the mid-Heian period onward.

== Gallery ==
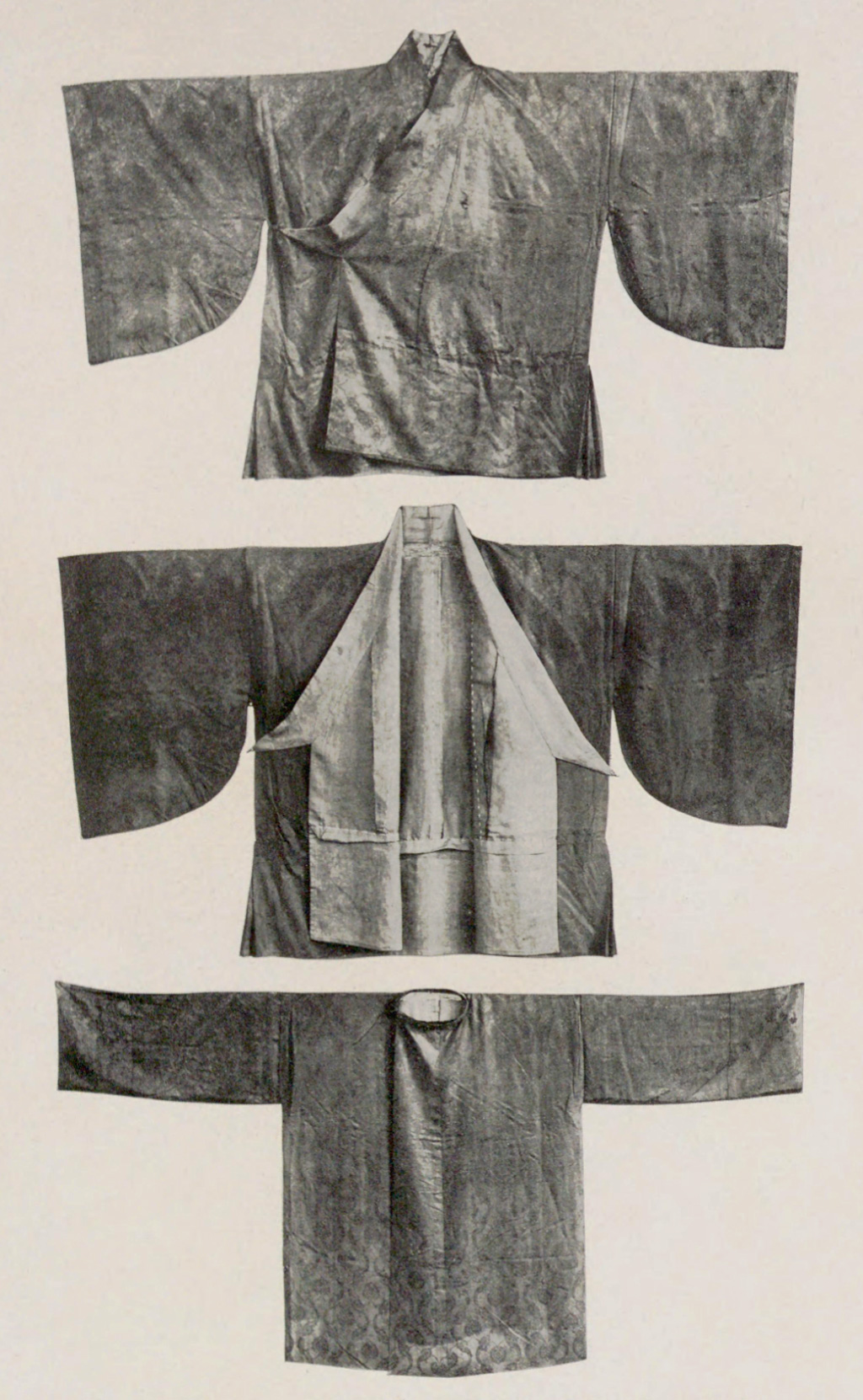
Large-sleeved robe and small-sleeved robe

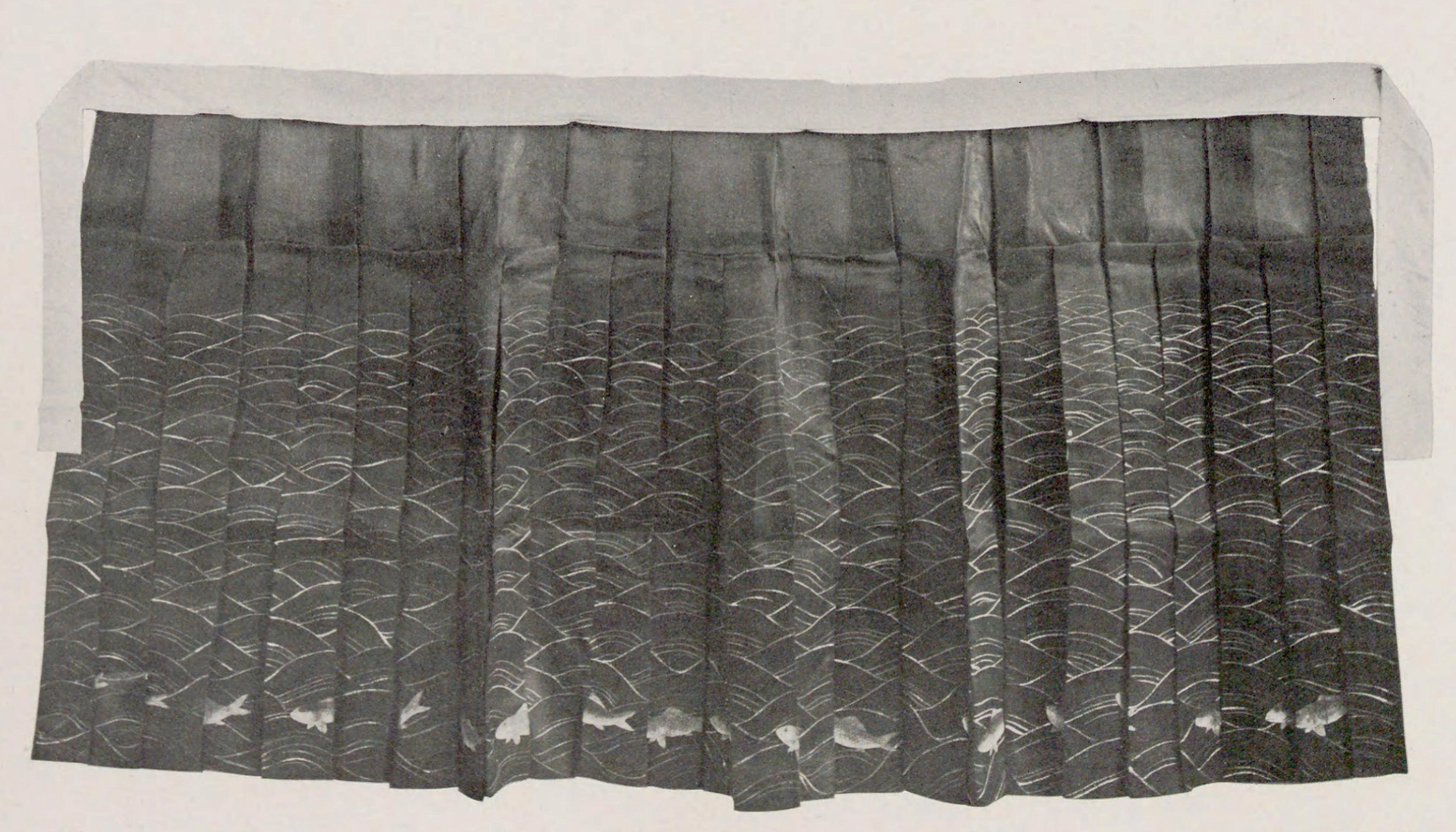
Hirami (mo)

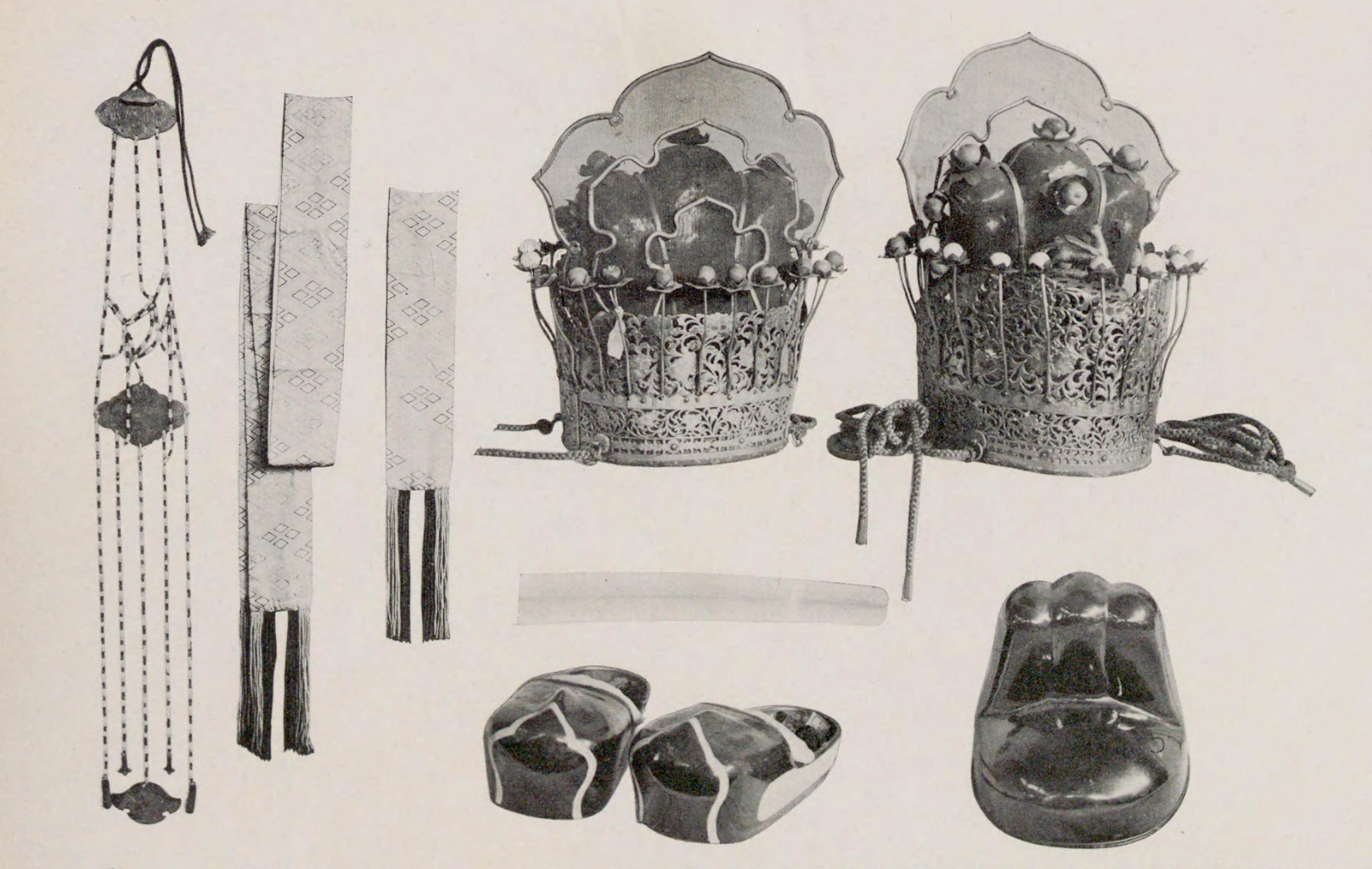
Raikan and accessories: front and rear views of the raikan, long and short ribbon ornaments, jade pendants, ivory shaku, three-peaked crown, and ceremonial shoes

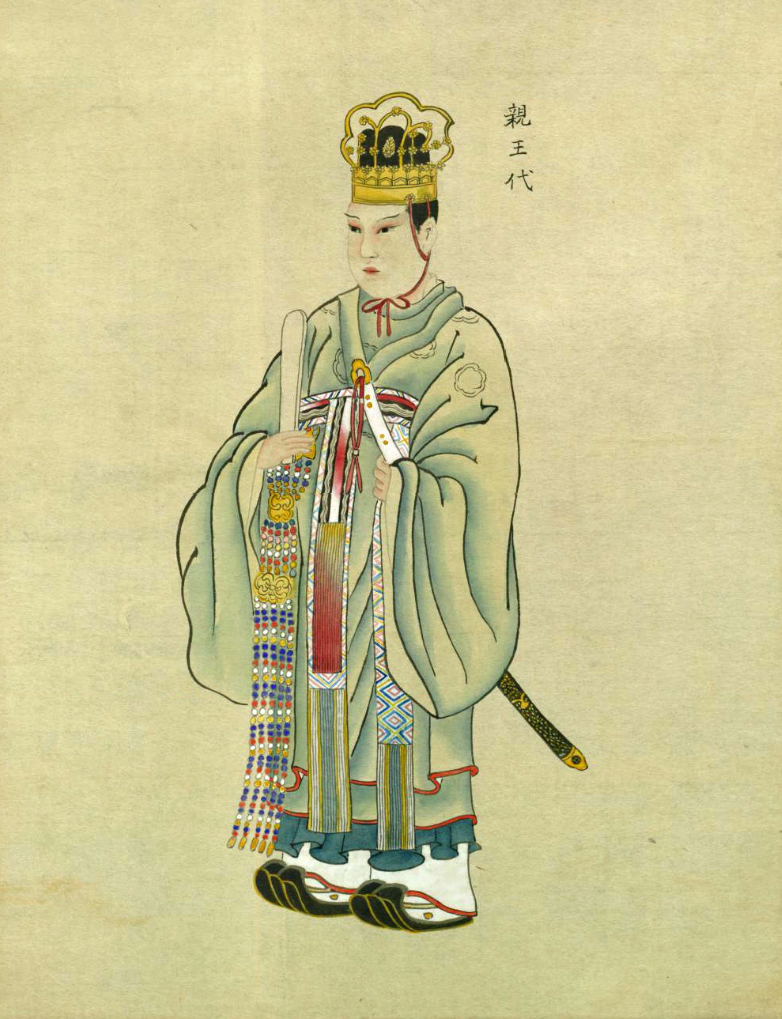
Civil official's raifuku

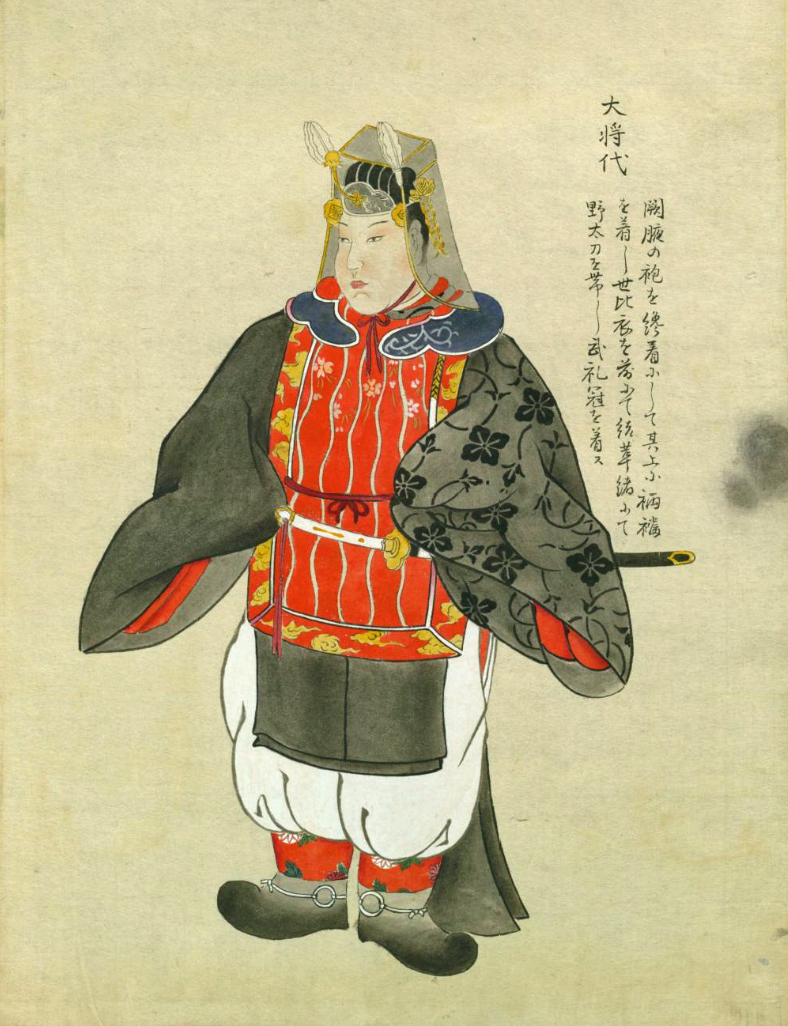
Military official's raifuku

== See also ==
- Sokutai
- Jūnihitoe
- Raikan
- Benkan
- Kon'e

== Bibliography ==
- Keizai Zasshisha, ed. (1916). 六国史：国史大系 類聚国史 [Six National Histories: Kokushi Taikei, Ruijū Kokushi] (in Japanese). Keizai Zasshisha. doi:10.11501/950692.
- Nihon Shiseki Hozonkai, ed. (1916). 史料通覧 山槐記一 [Historical Source Survey: Sankaiki, Vol. 1] (in Japanese). Nihon Shiseki Hozonkai. doi:10.11501/1918027.
- Nihon Shiseki Hozonkai, ed. (1917). 史料通覧 山槐記三 [Historical Source Survey: Sankaiki, Vol. 3] (in Japanese). Nihon Shiseki Hozonkai. doi:10.11501/1918040.
- Miura, Hiroyuki; Takikawa, Masajirō, eds. (1931). 校註 定本令集解釈義 [Annotated Standard Text of the Interpretations of the Ryō no Shūge] (in Japanese). Naigai Shoseki. doi:10.11501/1051673.
- Shirahata, Yoshi (March 1935). "図版解説 仲津姫像［奈良 薬師寺蔵］" [Plate Commentary: Statue of Nakatsu-hime [Yakushi-ji, Nara]]. 美術研究 [The Journal of Art Studies] (in Japanese) (39): 124–125. doi:10.11501/7964141.
- Kuroita, Katsumi, ed. (1939). 新訂増補 国史大系 [Newly Revised and Enlarged Compendium of Japanese History] (in Japanese). Vol. 22. Kokushi Taikei Kankōkai. doi:10.11501/3431635.
- Wada, Kiyoshi; Ishihara, Michihiro, eds. (1956). 旧唐書倭国日本伝・宋史日本伝・元史日本伝 [Accounts of Wa and Japan in the Old Book of Tang, Song History, and Yuan History]. Iwanami Bunko (in Japanese). Iwanami Shoten. doi:10.11501/2983687.
- Takeuchi, Rizō, ed. (August 1967). 續史料大成 増補 [Supplement to the Grand Collection of Historical Sources] (in Japanese). Vol. 18. Rinsen Shoten. doi:10.11501/2529857. ISBN 4-653-00464-1.
- Horikoshi, Sumi (1974). 資料日本衣服裁縫史 [Source Materials for the History of Japanese Dressmaking] (in Japanese). Yūzankaku Shuppan. doi:10.11501/12103210.
- Masuda, Yoshiko (March 1982). "高松塚古墳壁画の服飾と唐風化" [Costume in the Takamatsuzuka Tomb Murals and the Influence of Tang Style]. 服飾美学 [Journal of Aesthetics of Costume] (in Japanese) (11). Fukushoku Bigakkai. doi:10.11501/1837467.
- Tsuchida, Naoshige; Tokoro, Isao, eds. (June 1992). 北山抄 [Kitayama-shō]. 神道大系 朝儀祭祀編 (in Japanese). Vol. 3. Shintō Taikei Hensankai. doi:10.11501/12265373.
- Ishida, Sanehiro (March 2013). "所謂『文安御即位調度図』の祖本をめぐって" [On the Prototype of the So-called Bun'an Gosokui Chōdozu]. 書陵部紀要 [Bulletin of the Archives and Mausolea Department] (in Japanese) (64). Archives and Mausolea Department, Imperial Household Agency: 1–8.
- Takeda, Sachiko; Tsuda, Daisuke (August 2016). 礼服：天皇即位儀礼や元旦の儀の花の装い [Ceremonial Attire: Imperial Enthronement Rites and New Year Ritual Dress] (in Japanese). Osaka University Press. ISBN 978-4-87259-551-2.
- Kondō, Yoshikazu (16 March 2019). 天皇の装束：即位式、日常生活、退位後 [Imperial Attire: Enthronement Ceremonies, Daily Life, and Post-Abdication]. Chūkō Shinsho (in Japanese). Vol. 2536. Chūō Kōron Shinsha. ISBN 978-4-12-102536-4.
