= Nine-rank system =

Ranking system in the Imperial Chinese civil service

- Chinese: 九品中正制
Transcriptions
Standard Mandarin
- Hanyu Pinyin: Jiǔpǐn Zhōngzhèng Zhì

The nine-rank system, also known as the nine-grade controller system, was used to categorize and classify government officials by rank in Imperial China. Their accorded rank signified their status in the government hierarchy and the amount of wages they earned. Created by the politician Chen Qun in the state of Cao Wei during the Three Kingdoms, it was used until the Song dynasty, and similar ranking systems were also present in the Ming dynasty and Qing dynasty.

A similar system was also used in Korea. In Japan, the Twelve Level Cap and Rank System was adopted in 603 AD during the reign of Empress Suiko.

== History ==
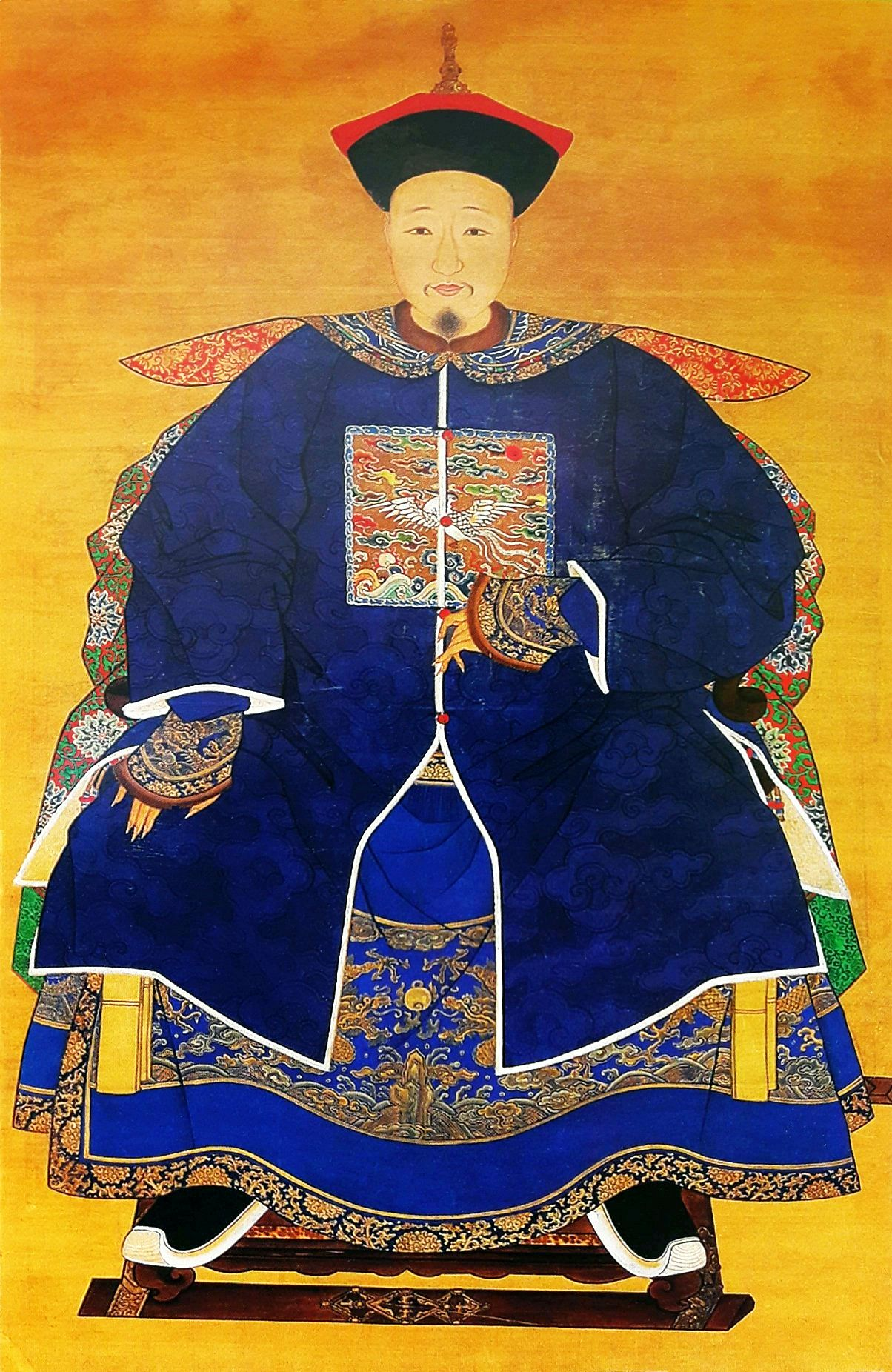
Portrait of a young Qing Dynasty government official with mandarin square of the seventh rank (Mandarin duck) on the chest. Mandarin duck was a symbol of marital fidelity and thus loyalty, a noble quality in a government official.

=== Background ===
Prior to the nine-rank system, official positions were denoted by their salary paid in shi or dan ("bushels") of rice or other grains, used to feed and supply their household staff. For example, during the Han, the highest-ranking officials were classed as wanshi (萬石), meaning countless bushels, and were paid 350 shi of grain per month. The lowest ranking petty subofficials were paid in dou ("pecks"), amounting to less than 100 bushels per year.

The nine-rank system was a reorganization of the Han dynasty practice of recommending noteworthy locals for political office. Since 134 BCE, during the reign of Emperor Wu of Han, the Han court relied mainly on nomination by local magnates and officials as a way of identifying talent, by nominating them under titles such as xiaolian (孝廉, "filial and incorruptible") or maocai (茂才, "outstandingly talented").

The nine-rank system was created after the end of the Han in 220 AD when Chen Qun, a court official from the state of Cao Wei, proposed it as a way of organizing the state bureaucracy. It was called the "nine-rank method for recruiting men for office" (Jiǔ pǐn guān rén fǎ; 九品官人法). During the Song dynasty it became the "system of Nine ranks and impartial judges."

Chen Qun's reform was a way of systematizing the selection of candidates for political appointments in two ways: by creating a common scale of nine ranks to evaluate a person and by appointing controllers (中正) in the court to grade officials on the scale. In practice, not only potential entrants but also existing officials were graded, creating two parallel systems: a "candidacy grade" (資品) and a "service grade" (官品). The system was ostensibly based on a few criteria: moral probity, administrative ability, and the contributions of the person or his family to the newly created Cao Wei regime. In practice, descent also played an important role, since the service grade of a candidate's father had a bearing on their candidacy grade.

The nine-rank system was originally intended to centralize the power of nominating and selecting appointees to office into the imperial court at Luoyang, but conflict remained between the right of evaluation between centrally-appointed controllers and the governors of the regions. Nonetheless, the continued instability and turmoil of the Three Kingdoms period meant that the nine-rank system was not fully or solely implemented. Mentions of the old nomination system as the basis for identifying talent remain prevalent in early Cao Wei writings.

The nine-rank system would become more dominant in the later years of the Cao Wei regime under the regency of the Sima clan and into the early years of the Jin regime during which it had changed in nature. Under Sima Yan, the power of controllers was expanded to include not only evaluation but also the nomination of talent and, with the conquest of Wu by Jin and the subsequent peace, the system also became more systematized and formalized. Through the changes, the nine-rank system also became more closely aligned with the interests of the powerful official clans who had come to dominate imperial politics since the Cao Wei period. The expanded powers of the appointed controllers in turn meant that the officials who held the post, many of whom came from these clans, could use their powers to promote the interests of their own scions.

While the nine-rank system helped powerful clans to dominate official posts in the court, it also helped stimulate private schooling within families as a means of transmitting knowledge that could increase one's standing as someone eligible for evaluation. An example of this intrafamilial transmission of skills is the calligrapher Wang Xizhi, of the Wang clan of Langya that was prominent during the Eastern Jin, whose sons, Wang Ningzhi, Wang Huizhi and Wang Xianzhi, were all famed calligraphers in their own right. The emphasis placed by the nine-rank system on moral attributes such as filial piety also led to the growth of "familial instructions" (家訓), which aimed to transmit moral teachings to children, as a genre of writing in the Jin and subsequent dynasties.

During the Northern Wei, ranks four to nine added additional upper and lower ranks to the standard and secondary ranks, giving the nine-rank system a total of 30 ranks (6 in the top 3 ranks; 24 from ranks 4 to 9).

After the Northern Song the nine ranks reverted to the original standard of 18 ranks, with each rank containing only two classes.

=== Organization ===
The upper ranks were 1 − the highest — to 3, the middle were 4 to 6, and the lower were 7 to 9. Each rank had two classes − standard and secondary − for 18 steps. From the Northern Wei to before the Northern Song, classes from ranks 4 to 9 were further divided into upper and lower grades for 30 steps.

Ranks were expressed as class, rank, then grade; for example: Standard class, Rank 4, Upper grade (Chinese: 正四品上; pinyin: Zheng si pin shang).

Prestige titles were also awarded, normally based on seniority, to confer status among officials of the same rank.

From the Han to the Sui, local recruiters recommended official candidates. Social status became the most important criterion, and powerful local families secured places in government; this led to the saying: "There are no poor people in the upper ranks and no powerful families in the lower ones." Centralization during the Sui and Tang reduced the power of the local elites, and candidates started to be selected by the imperial examination system instead of by recommendations. By the Song, recruitment through examination was the norm.

== See also ==
- Number nine in Chinese culture
- Twelve Level Cap and Rank System

== Bibliography ==
- Wilkinson, Endymion (2012), Chinese History: A New Manual, Harvard University Asia Center for the Harvard-Yenching Institute
- Ebrey, Patricia (1978), The Aristocratic Families in Early Imperial China: A Case Study of the Po-Ling Ts'ui Family, Cambridge University Press
