= 621 (disambiguation) =

621 may refer to:

- The year
  - 621 A.D.
  - 621 B.C.
- The number 621
- Experiment 621, also known as "Chopsuey", from Disney's Stitch: Experiment 626 video game
- Flavour Enhancer 621 - Monosodium glutamate

== Events ==
- 621 births
- 621 deaths

== See also ==
- e621 (website), a furry fandom imageboard website
