= Kanmuri (headwear) =

Type of Japanese crown

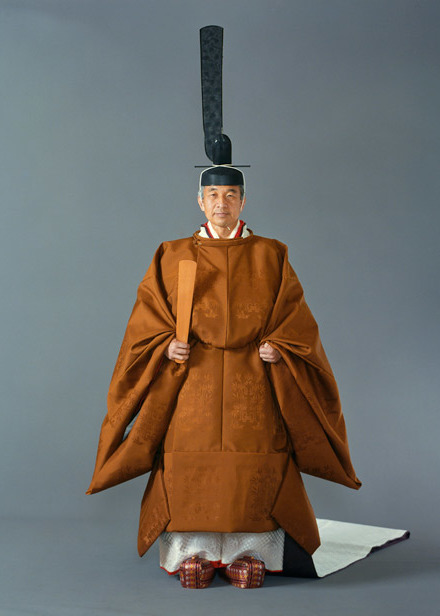
Emperor Akihito wearing a kanmuri with sokutai

A kanmuri (冠; lit. 'crown') is a type of headwear worn by adult men of the kuge (noble class) and buke (samurai class) in Japan. It was generally made of thin black silk hardened with lacquer, but there was also a metal crown called a raikan that was worn only during the emperor's enthronement ceremony and the chōga ceremony (New Year greeting ceremony).

It was the standard headwear worn by adult men at the Japanese imperial court, including courtiers, aristocrats, and the emperor, from the Heian period to the Meiji Restoration. Today, it is worn only by the Imperial Family, Shinto priests, and government officials on rare occasions, such as weddings and the accession of new emperors. It is worn in conjunction with the sokutai.

At the back of the kanmuri is a long, thin silk ornament called ei (纓), which is a variation of string. Types of kanmuri generally differ in the shape of the ei and the textile pattern, and also according to the rank of the person.

The Toyota Camry is named after the kanmuri.

== Terminology ==
Kanmuri (かんむり) is a word that is a corruption of kōburi (こうぶり), originally meaning "headwear". The main materials used for kanmuri were gold, silver, gilt, and cloth or cloth hardened with lacquer. Gradually, however, it came to refer primarily to the lacquer-fastened cloth headwear worn by the nobility with their court dress (sokutai).

Kanmuri is written as 冠 in Chinese characters and also pronounced kan in on'yomi (Chinese reading). It is also added as a suffix to other words to denote various types of kanmuri. For example, benkan (冕冠), raikan (礼冠), sui'ei-kan (垂纓冠), ken'ei-kan (巻纓冠), etc.

== Structure ==
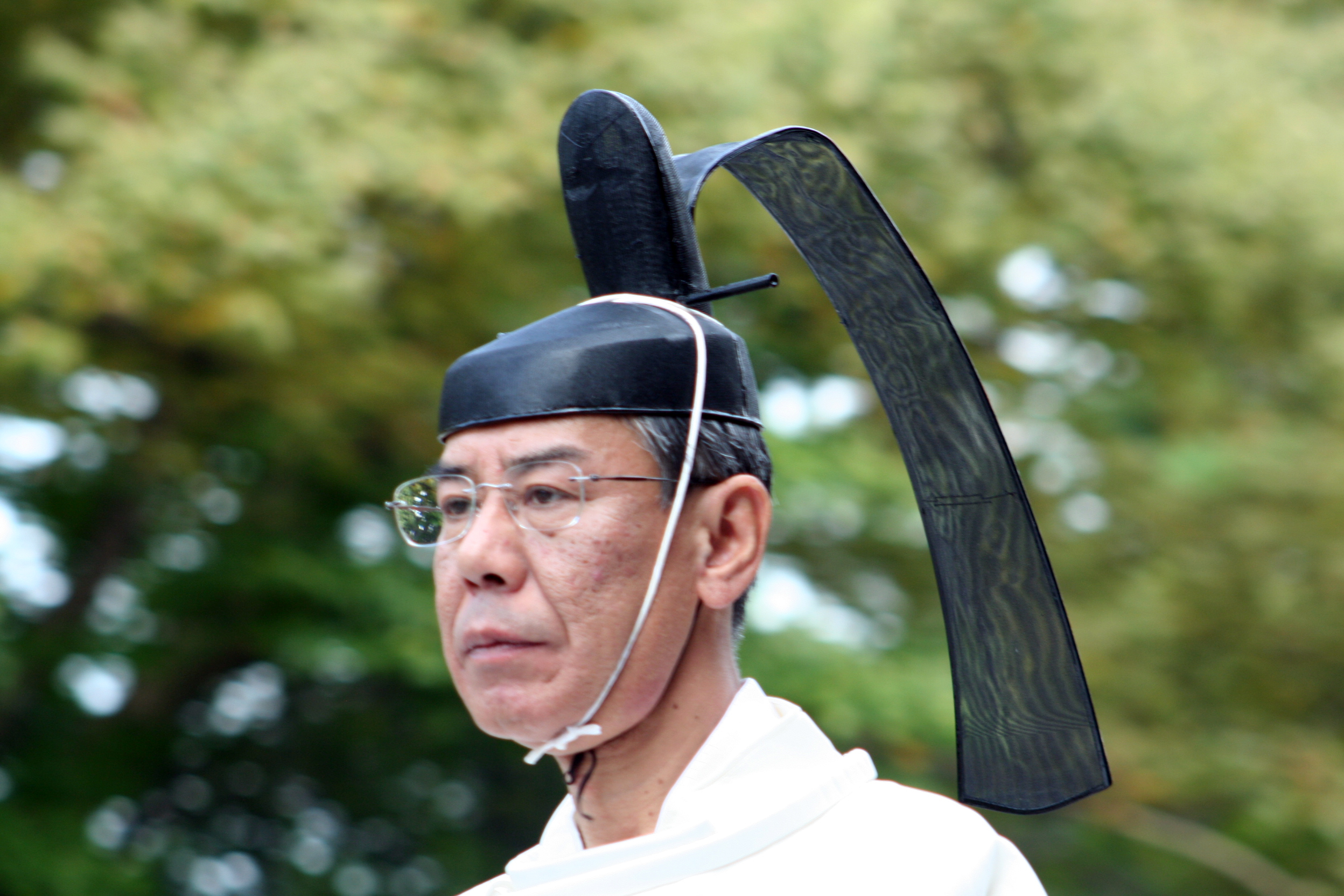
Sui'ei, a typical kanmuri for civilian officials. From the Jidai Matsuri.

The kanmuri is divided into three main parts: the part worn on the head, the koji (巾子), which holds the topknot, and the ei (纓), a thin, long piece of cloth that hangs down the back.

As accessories, there is a string called ageo (上緒) that hangs at the base of the koji, and a hairpin that pierces the topknot and holds it in place.

The kanmuri of a military officer is adorned with a fan-shaped decoration made of horsehair called oikake (緌), which is attached to the sides of the kanmuri.

Depending on the ceremony, the kanmuri may also be adorned with a kazashi (挿頭), a flower arrangement made of fresh or artificial flowers.

Also, since the hairpin does not function in modern times because the topknot is not tied, a white paper string called kakeo (懸緒) is attached to keep the kanmuri from falling off the head, and is usually tied under the chin.

== History ==
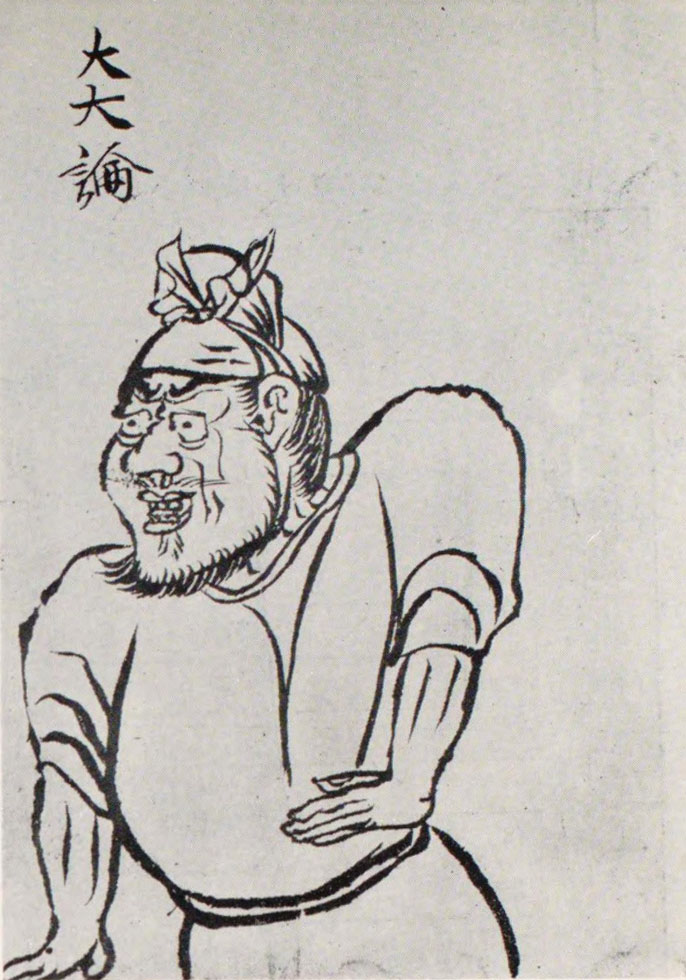
Painting of an official of the Nara period wearing a tokin, Shōsōin Treasure, 8th century

In the Chinese history book Sanguozhi (The Records of the Three Kingdoms), "Wajinden" (Treatise on the Wa People) describes that Japanese men wore nothing but a paper mulberry cloth around their heads, suggesting that there were still no crowns in Japan during the Yayoi period but something similar to hachimaki (Japanese headband).

In the Kofun period, gilt bronze crowns and crown caps have been excavated from kofun (tumuli) throughout Japan, including the Eta Funayama Kofun and the Fujinoki Kofun.

The official association of status with the kanmuri in Japan began with the establishment of the Twelve Level Cap and Rank System in 603. In a description of Japan in the Book of Sui (636), it is written, "In the Sui Dynasty, that (Japanese) king created the system of crowns for the first time. The crowns were made of brocade or patterned cloth, and were further adorned with gold or silver floral ornaments." (Note: The original text is "至隋，其王始制冠，以錦綵為之，以金銀鏤花為飾。".)

The Tenjukoku Shūchō Mandala (622), which is said to have been produced under the guidance of Prince Shōtoku's wife, shows that the kanmuri at that time was like a silk cap, with colors such as red, blue, black, and purple corresponding to the official rank.

The direct origin of the kanmuri in Japan is believed to be the tokin (頭巾), which was worn when wearing court dress (朝服), as established in the clothing ordinance of the Yōrō Code. This is similar to the futou (幞頭) used for the Tang dynasty's regular dress.

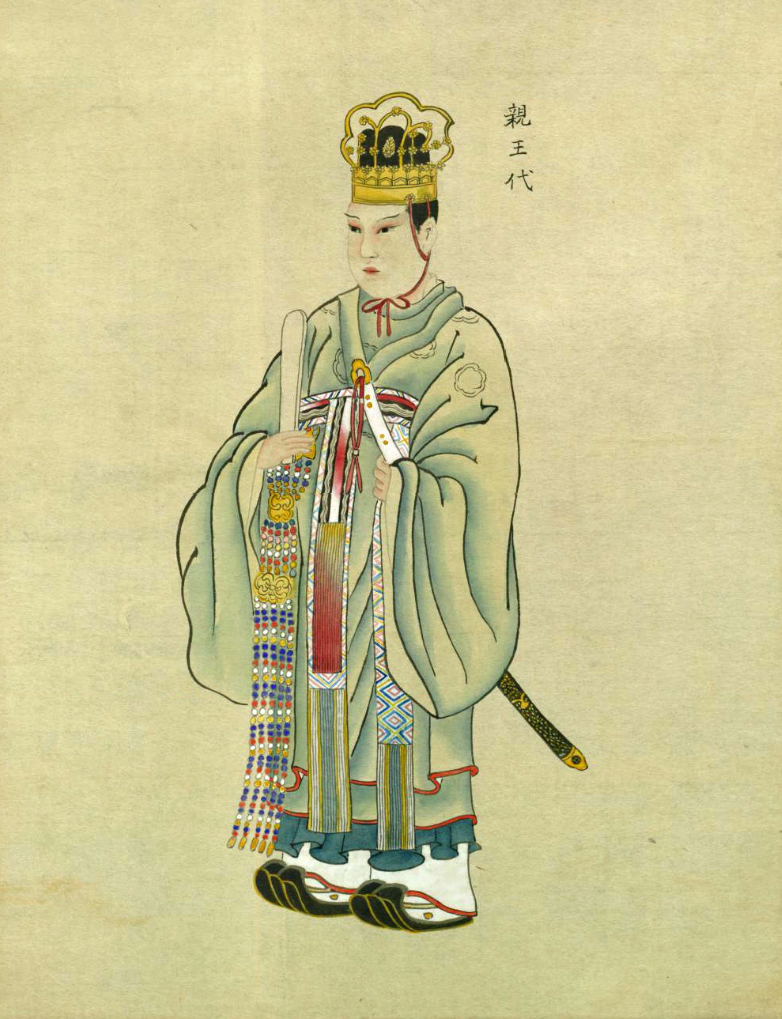
Raikan and raifuku for civilian officials

The first formal dress of the nobility was raifuku (礼服, lit. 'ceremonial dress'), in which they wore a metal and cloth crown called a raikan, and court dress was the second formal dress.

The tokin was a cap made of black silk with four strings (long narrow cloths) attached to the front and back of the cap. The front two strings tied at the top of the head were called ageo, and the back two strings tied at the back of the head were called enbi (燕尾, lit. 'swallow's tail').

The raikan and raifuku were expensive and were initially worn only for chōga (朝賀; lit. 'New Year's greetings') and enthronement ceremonies; later they were worn only for enthronement ceremonies. Hence, tokin and court dress became the de facto first formal attire.

During the Heian period (794-1185), the influence of Chinese culture was shed and a uniquely Japanese culture called kokufū bunka (国風文化; lit. 'national-style culture') flourished. Under this influence, tokion was replaced by kanmuri and court dress by sokutai.

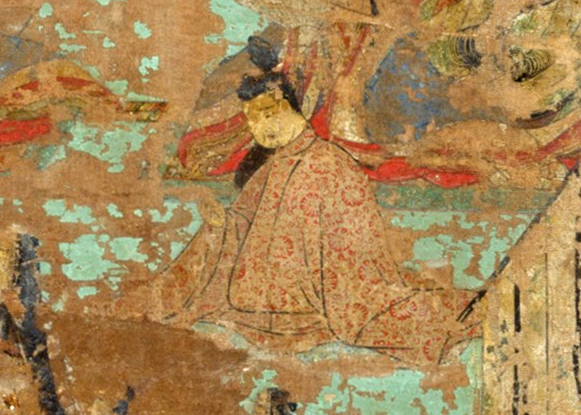
An aristocratic man wearing early kanmuri and sokutai. From Illustrated Biography of Prince Shōtoku (1069).

Although the Illustrated Biography of Prince Shōtoku (1069) is a painting about Prince Shōtoku (547-622), the costumes depicted in it are from the Heian period. Since kanmuri and sokutai of the time have not survived, they are important clues to understanding the costumes of the time.

The enbi, the strings at the back of the kanmuri, became known as ei, and changed from strings to ornaments. The cap part was hardened with black lacquer, but in the early period it was thinly coated with lacquer, so it lost its shape when it rained. Later, thicker coats of lacquer were applied to harden it.

Thin silk, the material used for kanmuri, is called ra (羅). ra is a textile using the leno weaving technique, invented in China and produced in Japan by the 7th century. The kanmuri for nobles of the fifth rank and above had patterns woven into the ra using a special technique. The ra with this pattern was called monra (文羅, lit. 'ra with pattern'). However, during the Ōnin War, which burned down most of Kyoto, the technical knowledge of making such monra was lost. Later, the monra was replaced by a technique of embroidering patterns directly on the ra.

One of the oldest surviving kanmuri is that of Tokugawa Ieyasu (1543-1616), the first shogun of the Tokugawa Shogunate. It is a kanmuri made of ra with no pattern.

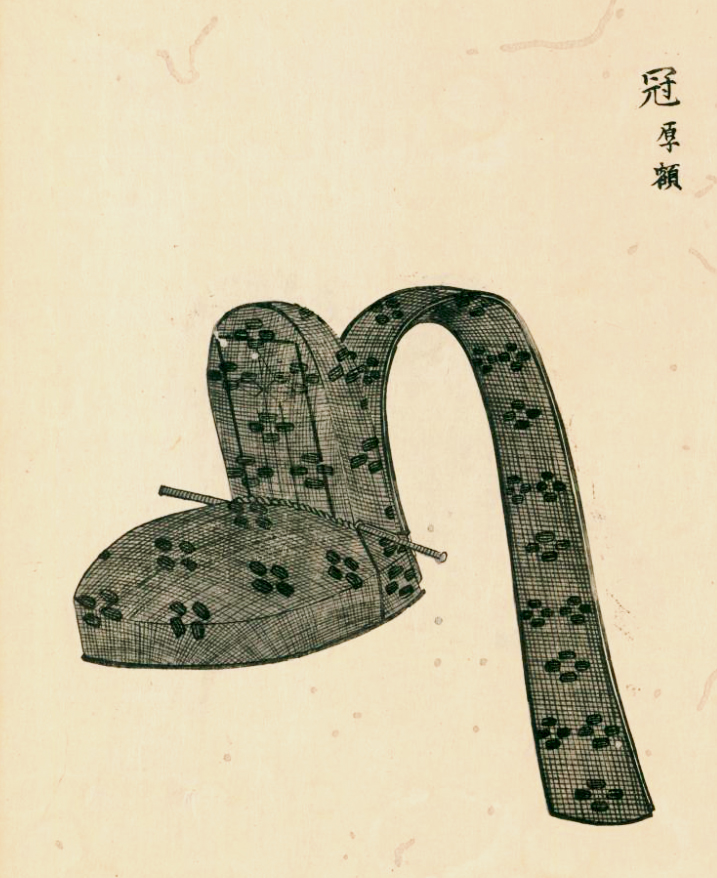
Kanmuri of sui'ei with pattern

In 1687, the kanmuri with embroidered patterns was revived from the Daijosai ceremony that accompanied the enthronement of Emperor Higashiyama. A total of 31 or 33 patterns were embroidered on the kanmuri of nobles of the fifth rank and above. This was called a kanmuri of shigemon (繁文; lit. 'many patterns'). A kanmuri with fewer patterns was called a kanmuri of tōmon (遠文; lit. 'patterns with many gaps') and was worn by the lower ranks of nobility.

In the Edo period (1603-1867), a new kanmuri called Go-Ryūei (御立纓) was introduced exclusively for the emperor, in which the ei stands upright. In the beginning, it was not perfectly upright, but stood gently bent. However, after the kanmuri of Emperor Meiji, it began to stand upright.

After the Meiji Restoration, the use of kanmuri declined dramatically as the formal dress of the Japanese nobility became Western-style. Currently, members of the imperial family use kanmuri for enthronement, marriage, and ritual ceremonies. Shinto priests also still use kanmuri today.

In the enthronement ceremony of Emperor Meiji, the benkan, which had been used until then, was rejected as being too Chinese in style, and Go-Ryū'ei was used instead. The Go-Ryū'ei was also used in the subsequent enthronement ceremonies of Emperors Taishō, Showa, Akihito, and Naruhito.

== Types of Kanmuri ==
- Benkan (冕冠): Metal and cloth crown exclusively for the Emperor.
- Raikan (礼冠): Metal and cloth crown for nobility of 5th rank and above.
- Go-Ryūei (御立纓): Kanmuri exclusively for the emperor.
- O-Kin Koji (御金巾子): A kanmuri with the ei fastened with gold leaf paper. For the emperor's daily use.
- O-Saku (御幘): A kanmuri used by the emperor during Shinto rituals.
- Sui'ei (垂纓): A kanmuri with the ei hanging down in the back.
- Ken'ei (巻纓): A kanmuri for a military officer with the ei wrapped around it.

== Gallery ==
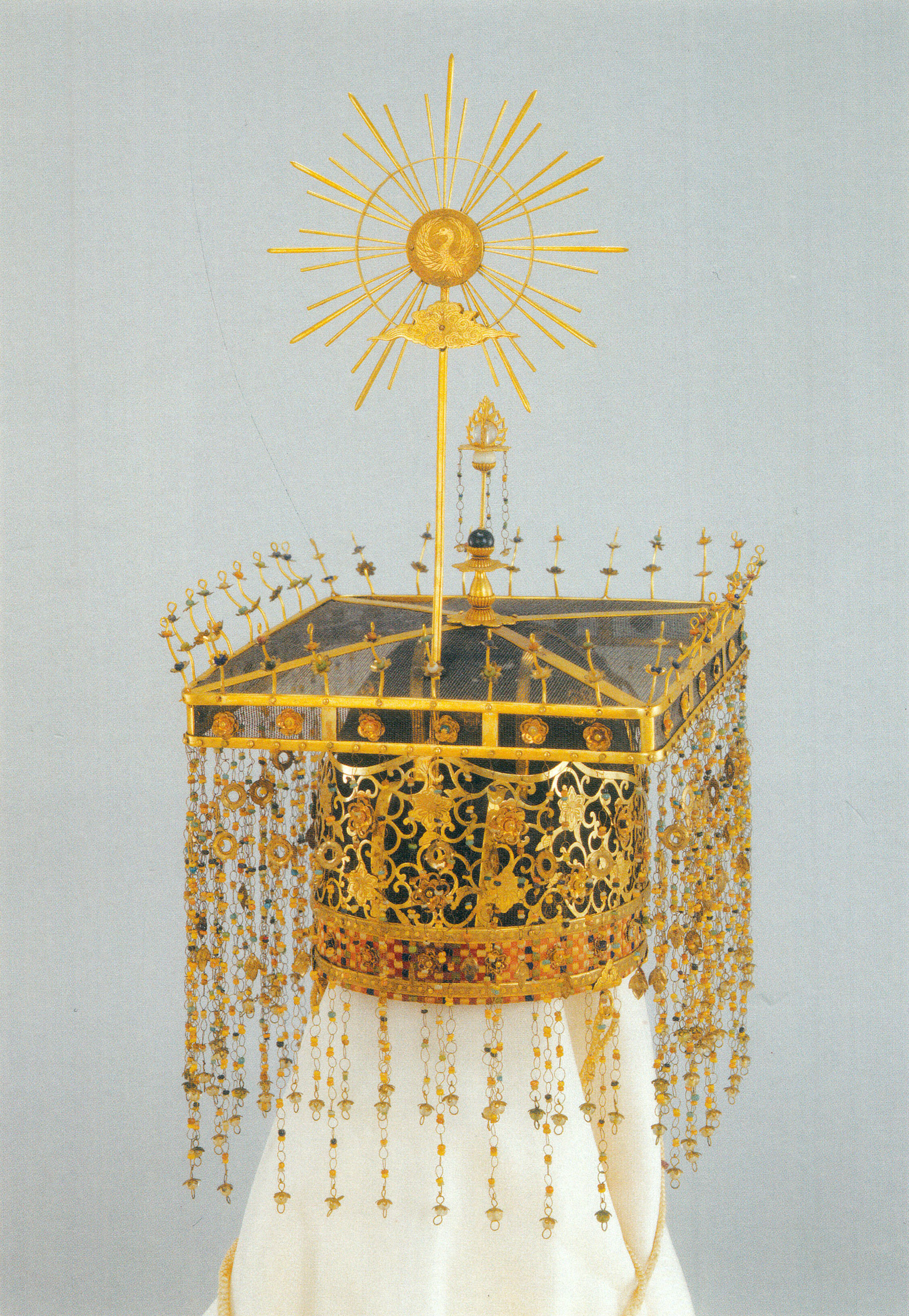
Benkan of Emperor Kōmei (reigned 1847-1867)

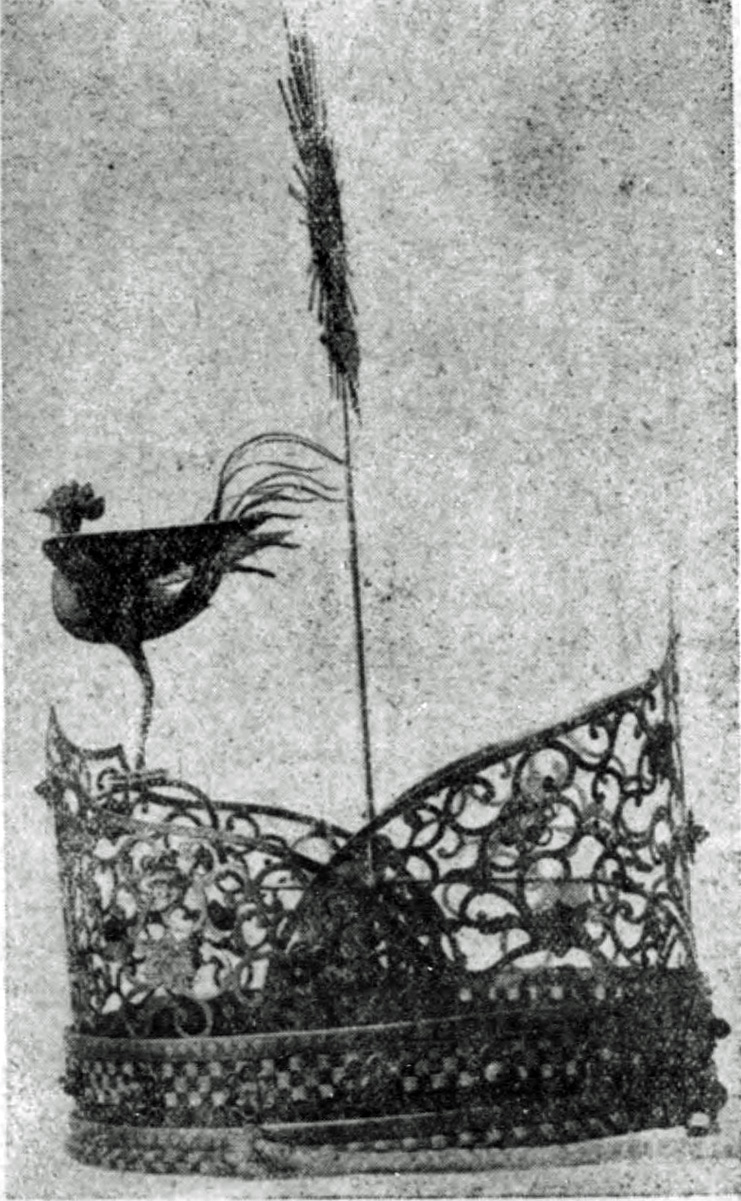
Sun-shaped celestial crown of Emperor Kōkaku (reigned 1779 -1817)

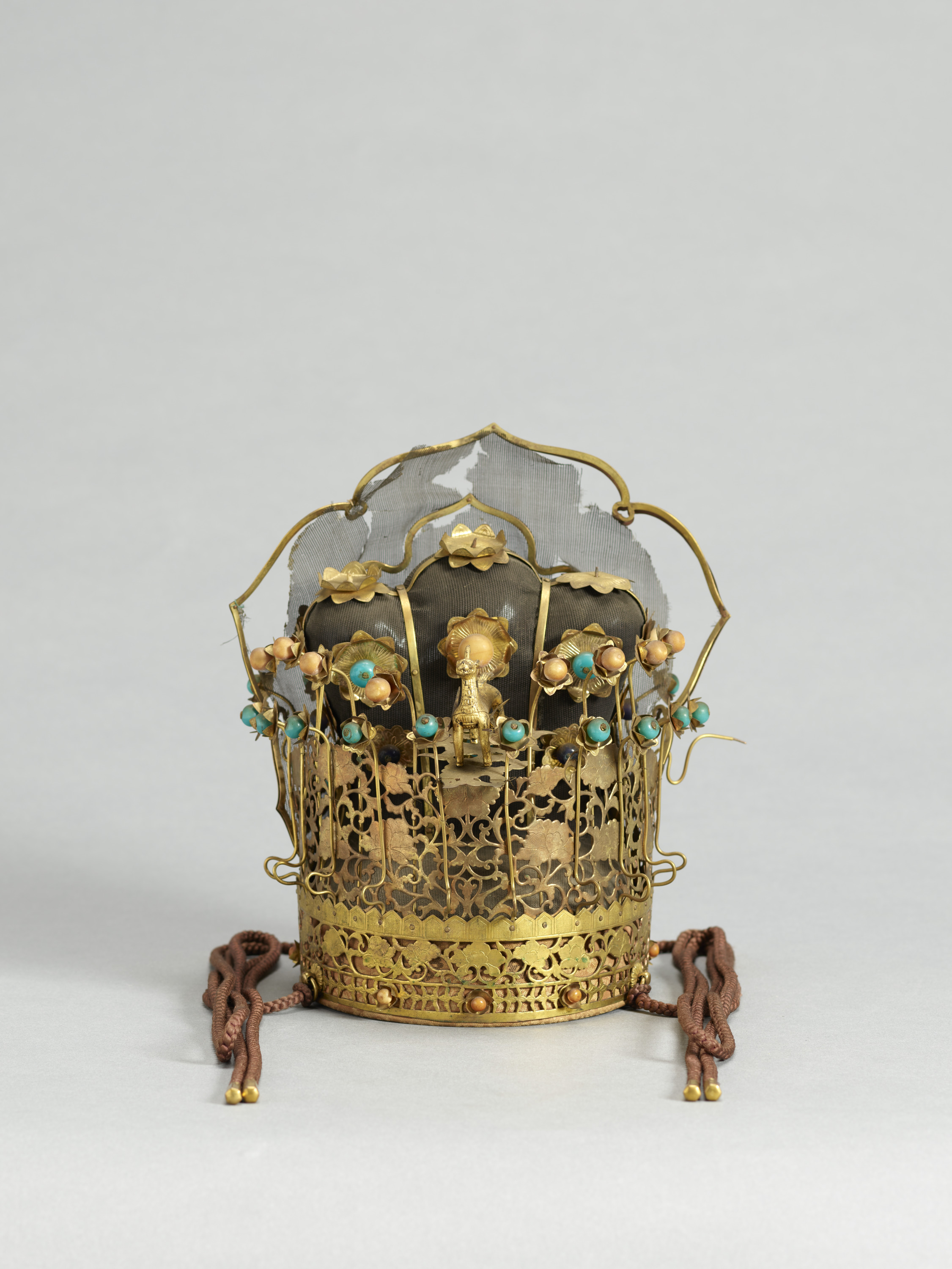
Raikan, 18th century

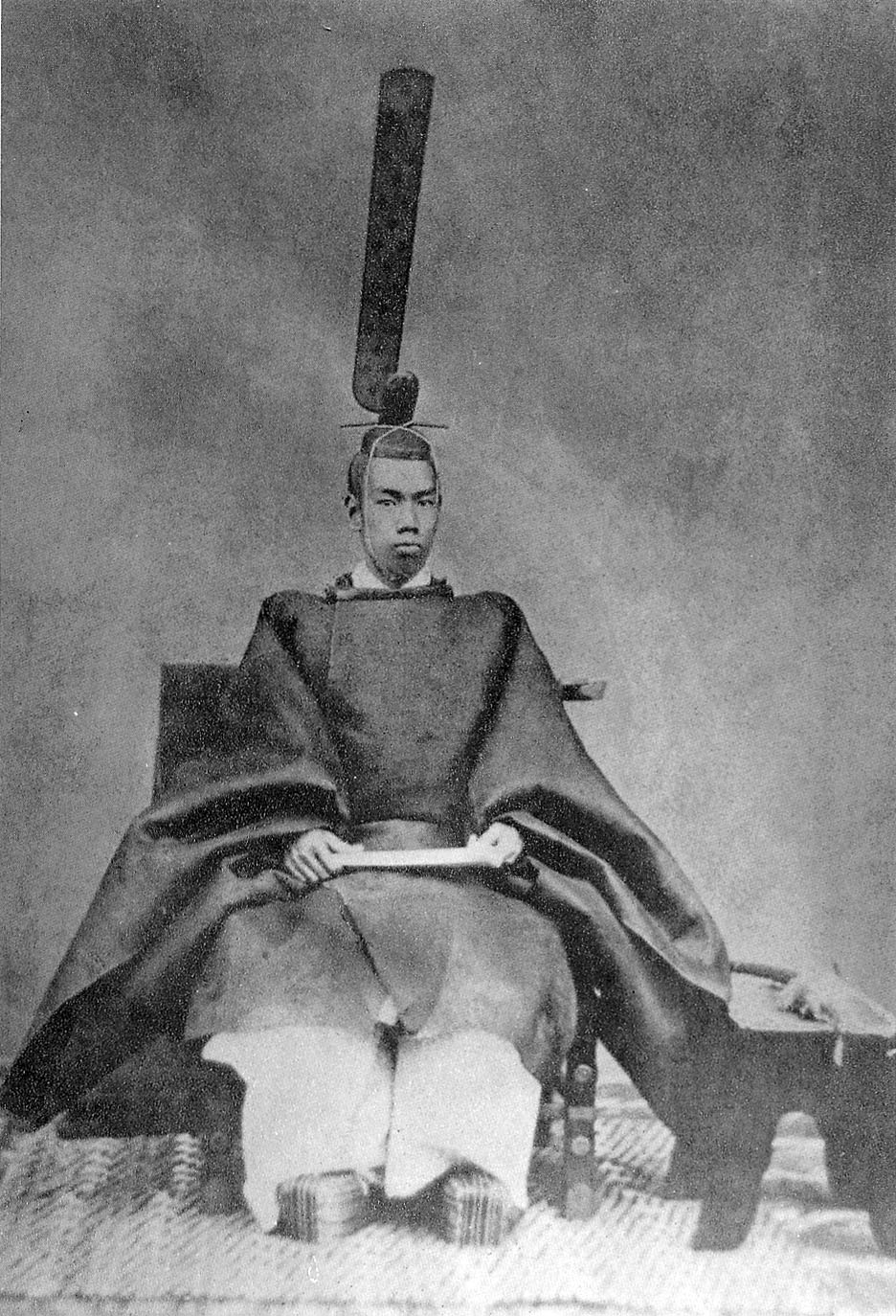
Emperor Meiji wearing Go-Ryū'ei

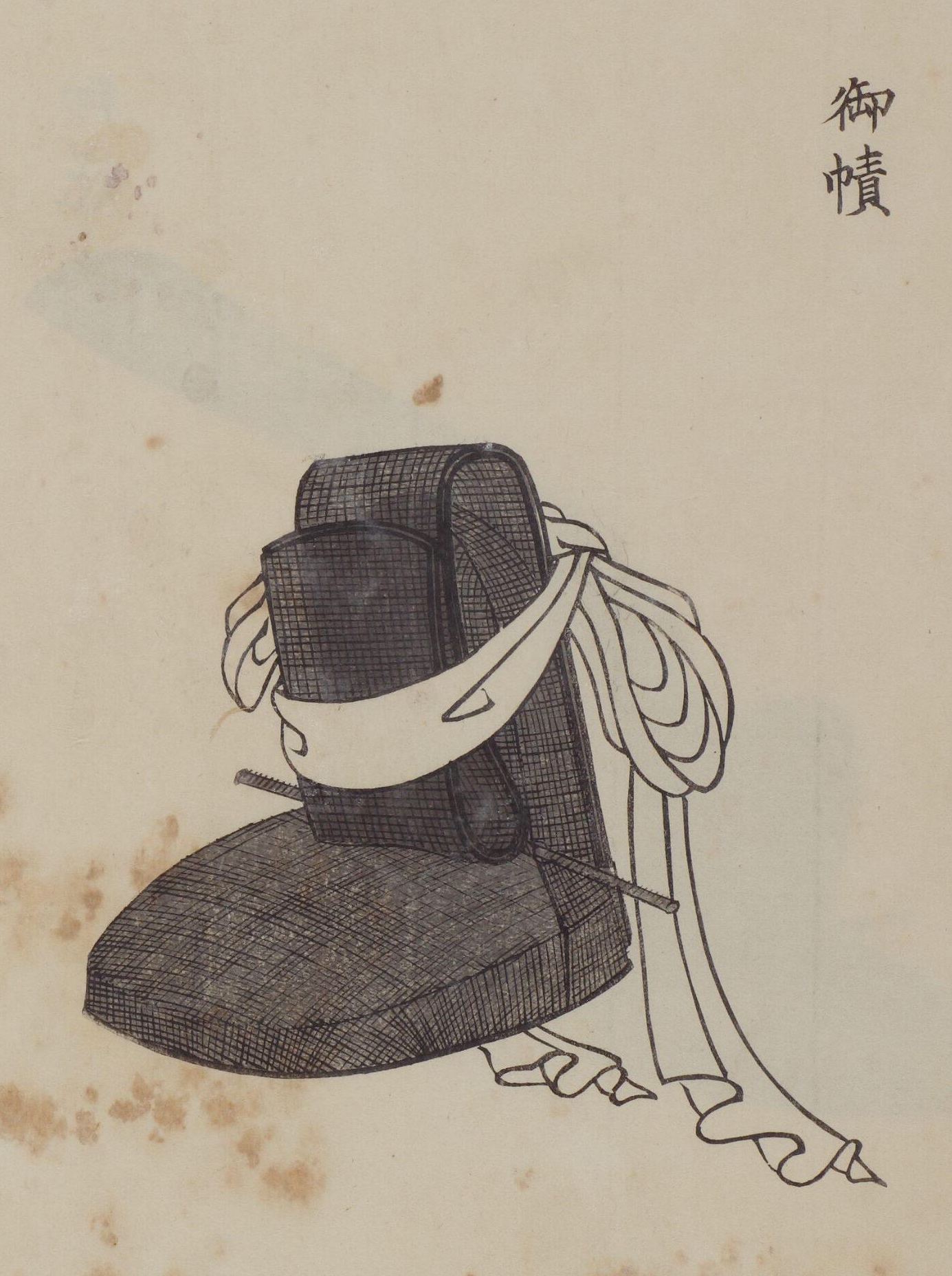
O-saku

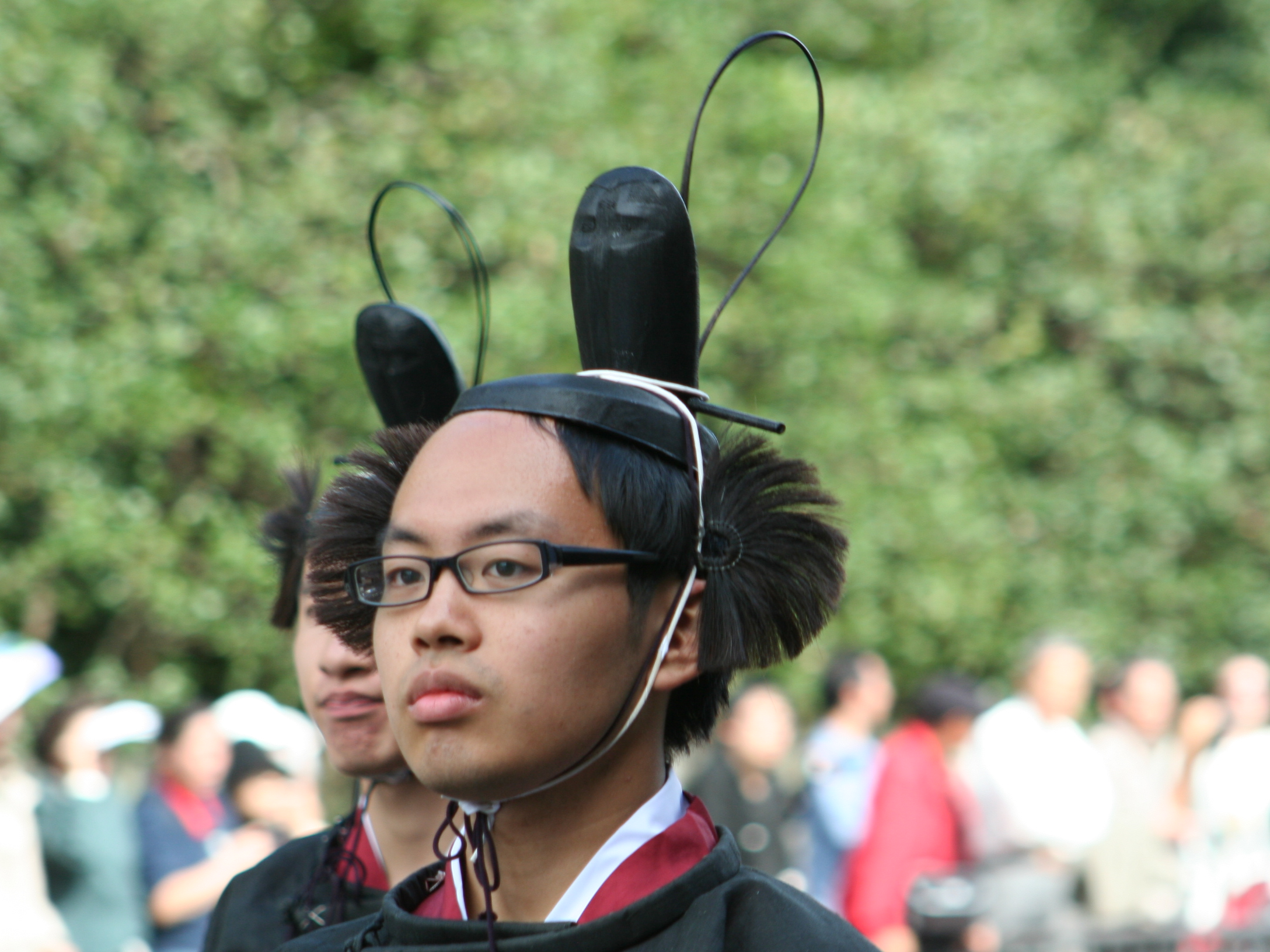
kanmuri for military officers

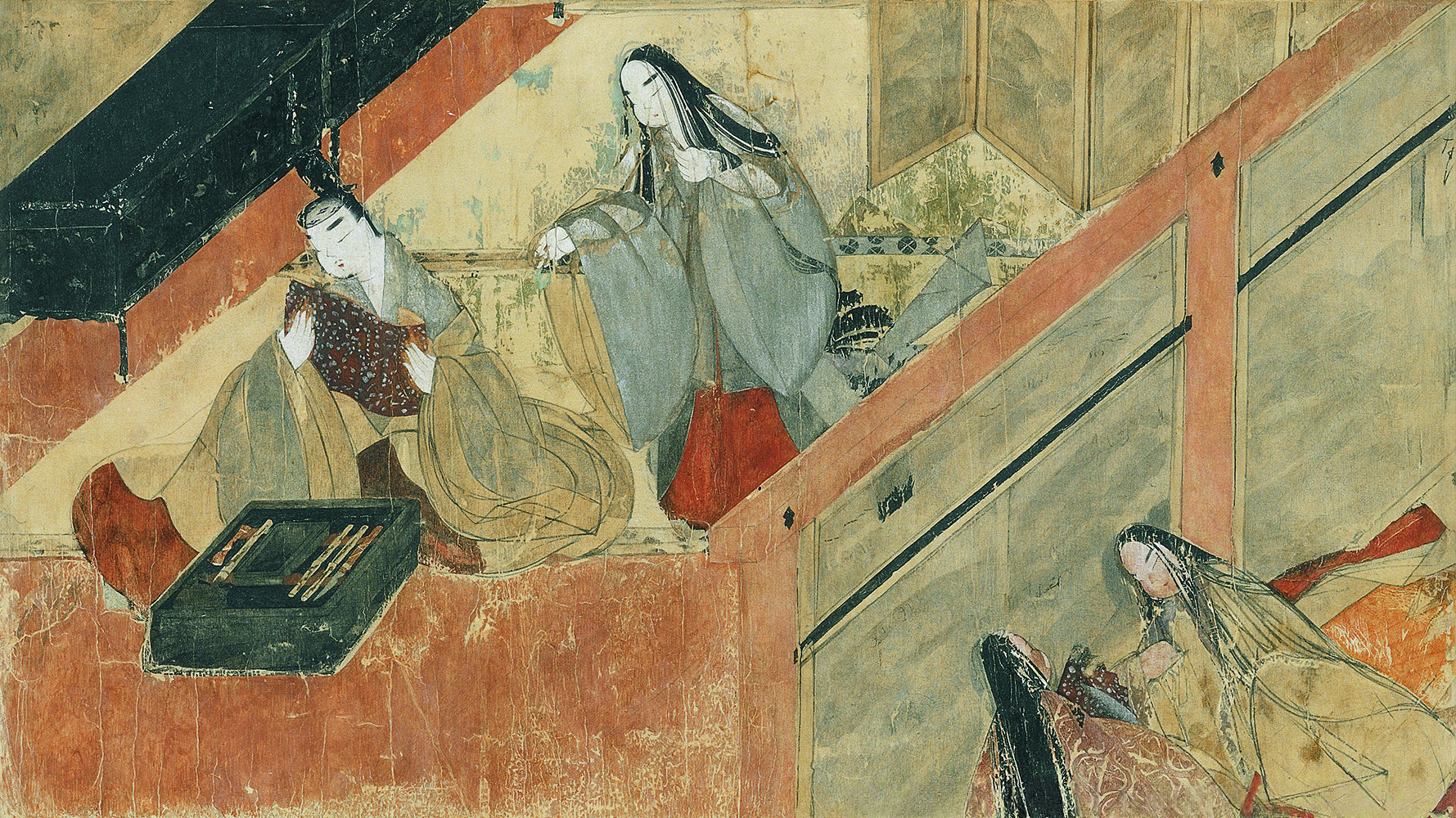
A nobleman wearing sui'ei kanmuri as depicted in the Genji Monogatari Emaki

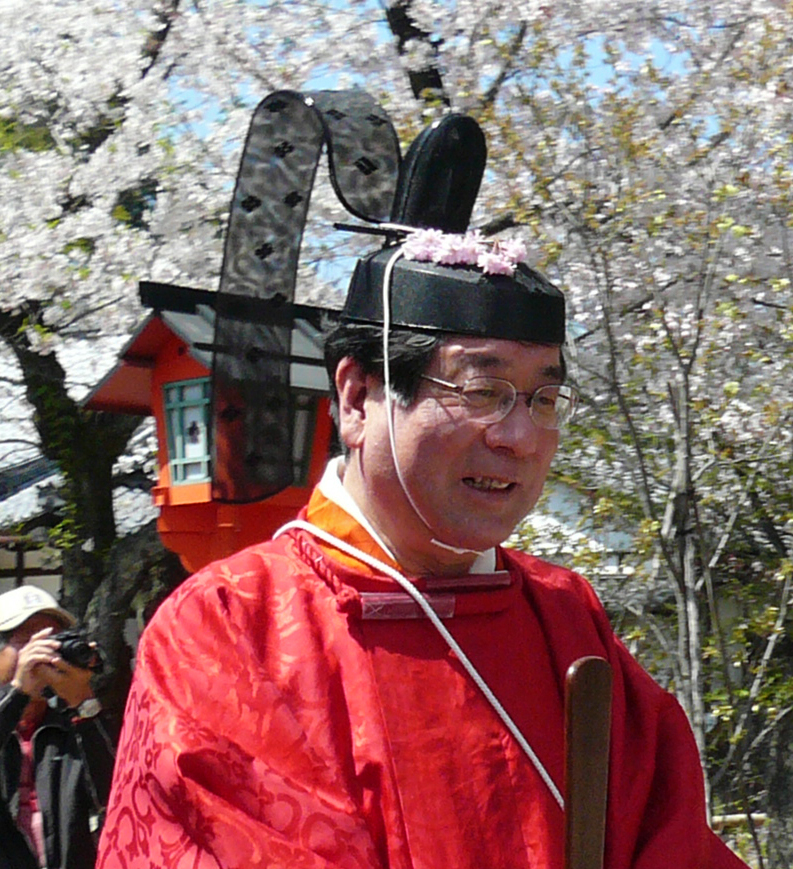
A kanmuri with a kazashi (floral ornament)

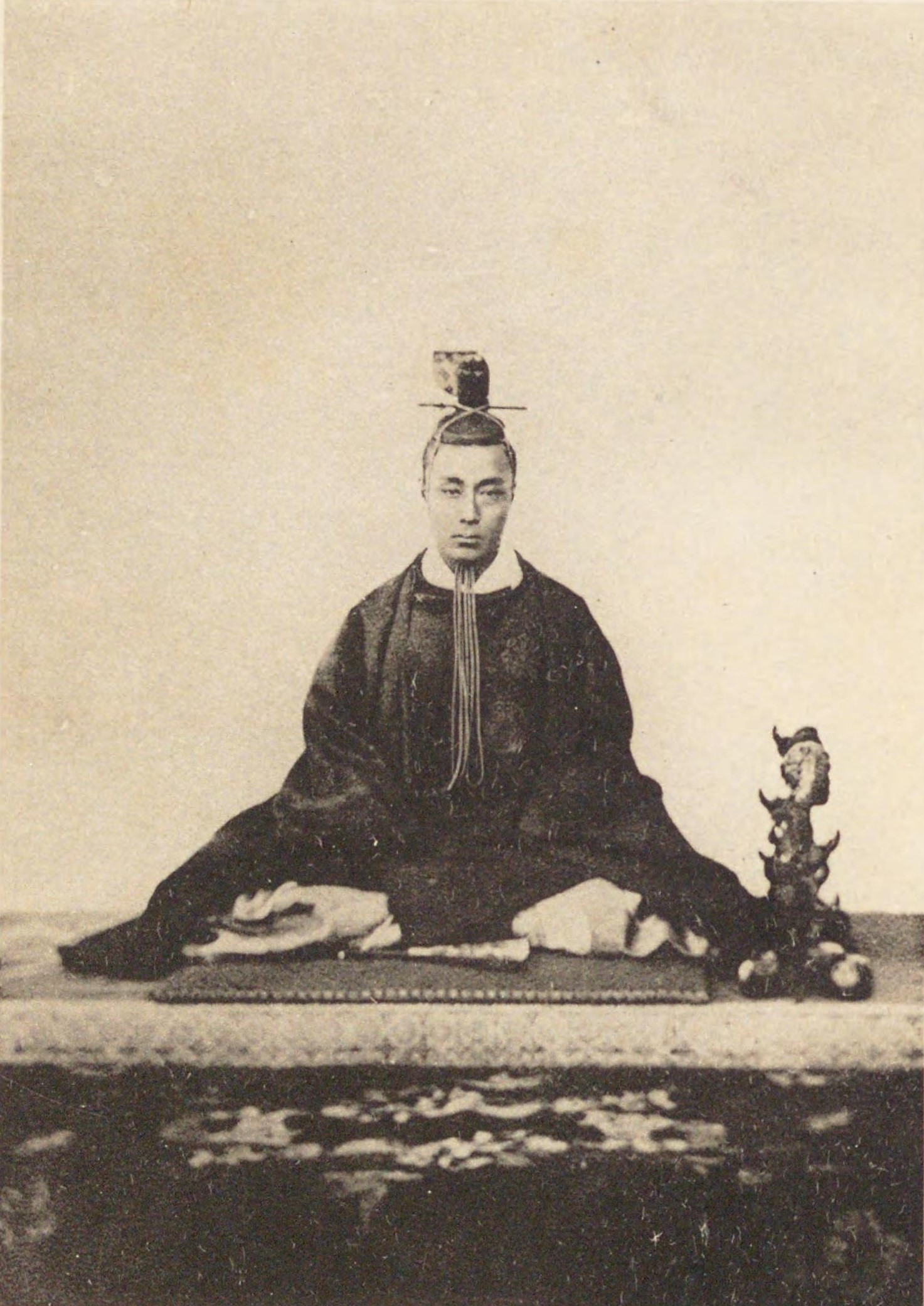
The last shogun, Tokugawa Yoshinobu

== See also ==
- Coronet
- Benkan
- Raikan
