= Sokutai =

Japanese men's court dress

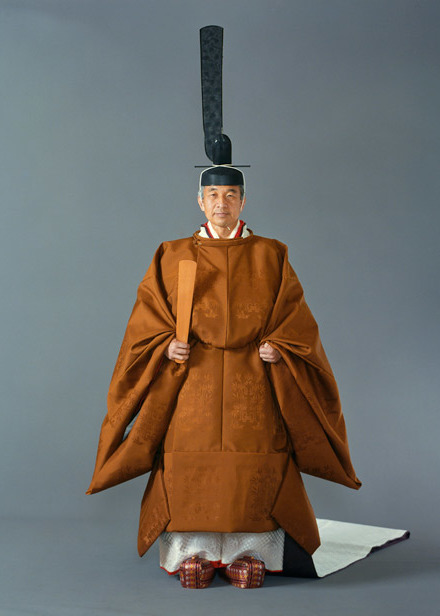
Emperor Akihito wearing the kōrozen no gohō, the distinctive yellow-brown outer robe reserved for the emperor, in 1990

The sokutai (束帯; traditional form: 束帶) is the full formal attire worn by men at the Japanese imperial court from the Heian period (794–1185) onward. It was worn by the emperor, male members of the imperial family, and the court nobility at court ceremonies and while performing official duties. Among the warrior class, the shogun and other men holding the Fifth Court Rank or higher also wore it on major ceremonial occasions.

The sokutai developed from the male court dress known as chōfuku under the ritsuryō system, which was gradually adapted to Japanese court practice during the Heian period. It was classified as formal ceremonial attire (hare no shōzoku) and was also called hi no shōzoku, literally “daytime attire”. The latter name distinguished it from simplified forms of court dress, such as hōko (布袴), and from garments worn by courtiers remaining overnight on duty at the palace, particularly the ikan.

The term sokutai refers to the complete ensemble rather than to a single garment. Its principal components included the hō (outer robe), hanpi (short-sleeved under-robe), shitagasane (under-robe, often with a long train), akome (intermediate robe), hitoe (unlined inner robe), hakama (trousers), kanmuri (formal court cap), sekitai (decorated leather belt), and shaku (ritual baton). In its complete form, the ensemble included headgear, inner and outer garments, accessories, objects carried in the hand or worn at the waist, and footwear.

The colour and woven design of the hō, the materials used for the inner garments, the form of the court cap, and the inclusion of a sword, bow, or arrows varied according to the wearer's court rank, office, age, the season, whether he served in a civil or military capacity, and the nature of the ceremony.

== History ==
=== Adoption of the Tang dress system and chōfuku ===
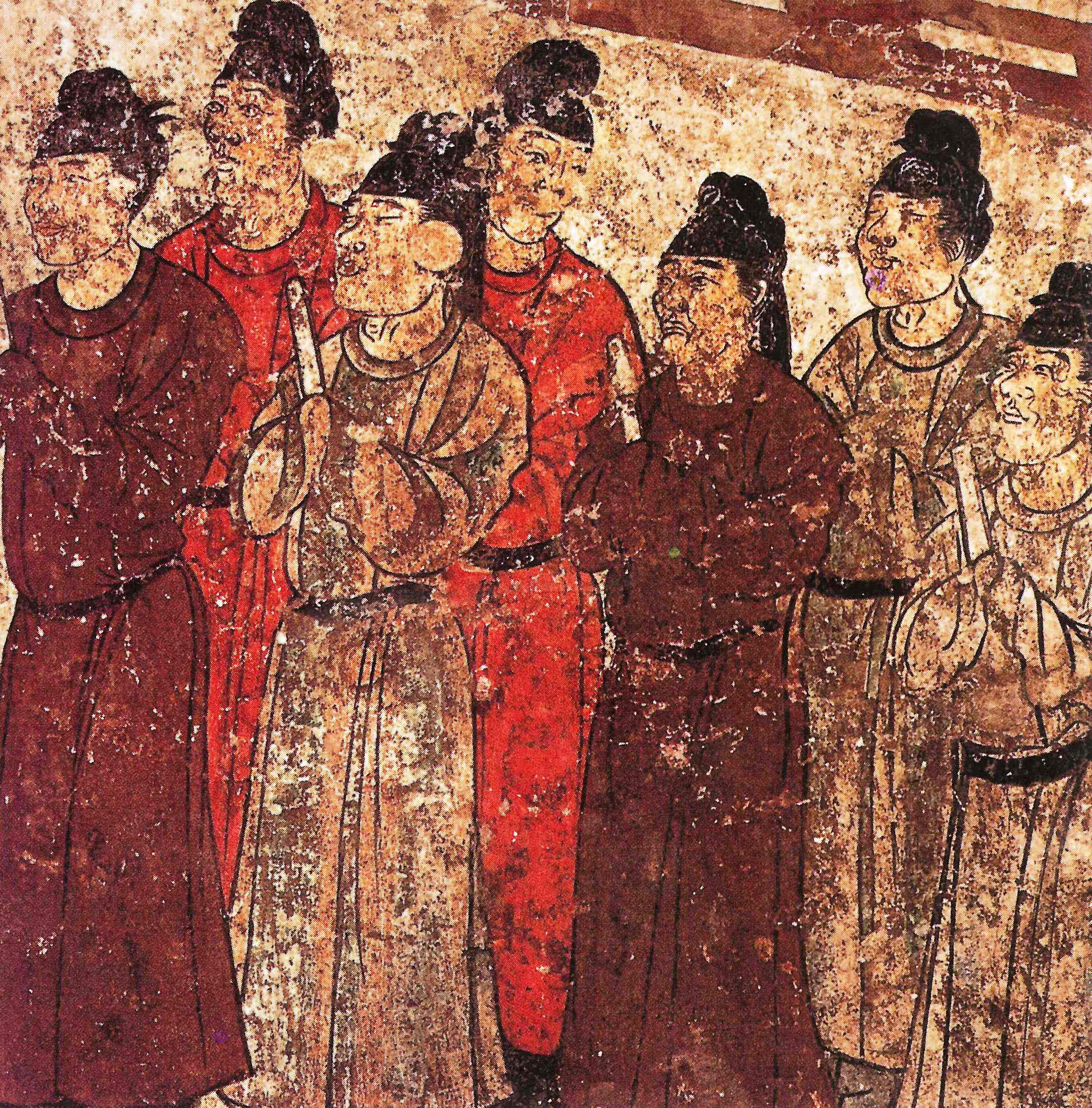
Tang-dynasty eunuchs wearing changfu, depicted in a mural from the tomb of Crown Prince Zhanghuai (706)

The regular court dress known under the Tang dynasty (618–907) as changfu (常服) inherited elements of hufu (胡服), clothing associated with the non-Han peoples of northern and Inner Asia, that had been adopted under the Northern Dynasties. Shen Kuo of the Song dynasty wrote in the Dream Pool Essays that “from the Northern Qi onward, Chinese court dress came entirely to use hufu”, and identified narrow-sleeved short garments, high boots, and belts fitted with hanging attachments as characteristic features.

This did not mean, however, that the entire Tang dress system had become hufu. The mianfu (冕服) worn as sacrificial dress preserved the ancient Chinese ritual ensemble of a dark upper garment and reddish lower garment, while the formal chaofu (朝服) and gongfu (公服) also retained elements of traditional Chinese ritual dress. The changfu, by contrast, was based on robe-style clothing of hufu origin.

In headgear, the four-lappet futou (幞頭), which had developed under the Northern Zhou, became widely used by officials during the Sui and Tang dynasties. It was adopted in Japan as the headcloth prescribed for chōfuku and subsequently developed into the rigidly formed kanmuri, the formal cap of the Japanese court.

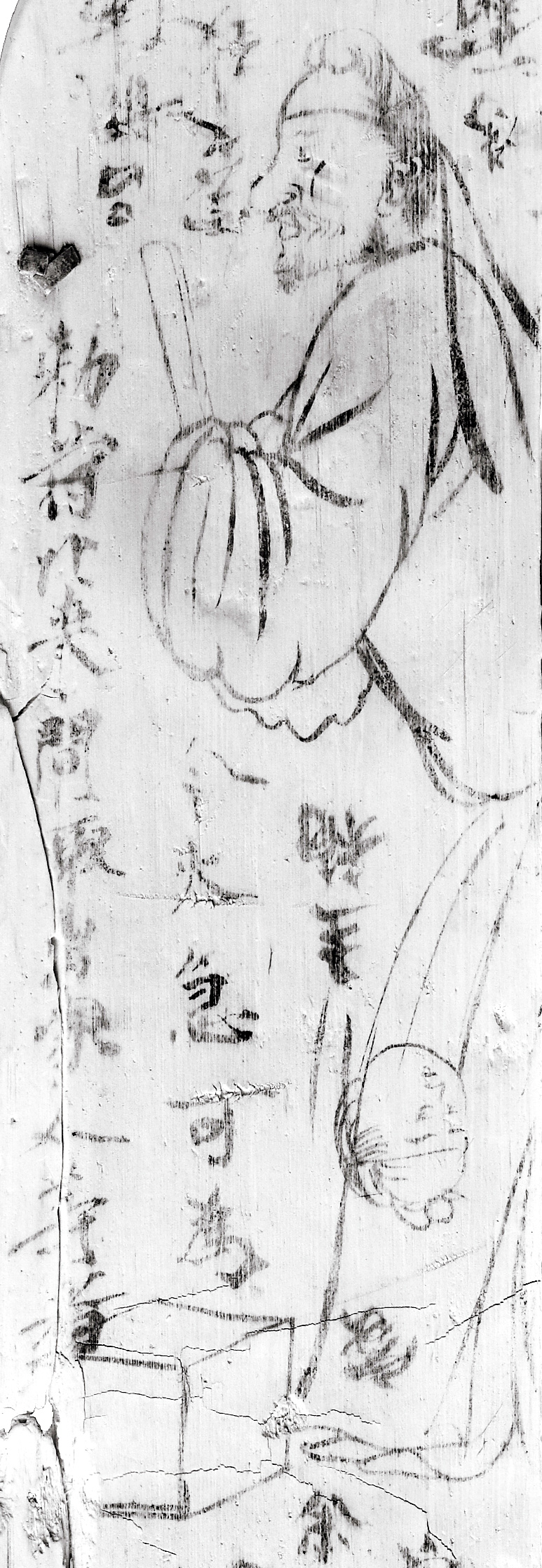
A government official in chōfuku, depicted on a wooden tablet from the residence of Prince Nagaya during the Nara period

Under the ritsuryō system of the Nara period (710–794), the clothing provisions of the Yōrō Code prescribed three categories of official dress for government officials: raifuku, formal ceremonial dress; chōfuku, ordinary court dress; and seifuku, prescribed service dress. Of these, chōfuku was the ordinary official attire worn by members of the imperial family and government officials when conducting business at court.

Japan did not simply transplant the Tang dress system in its entirety. The raifuku prescribed for imperial princes and officials below them had a strongly indigenous Japanese character when compared with Tang ceremonial dress. Men's chōfuku under the Yōrō Code, by contrast, followed the form of Tang changfu rather than that of Tang chaofu. Its system of assigning the colour of the outer garment according to court rank was also based on Tang legal provisions governing dress worn when attending court.

Under the clothing provisions of the Yōrō Code, the upper garment worn with the chōfuku of civil officials was termed simply “garment” (衣), while that worn by military officials was termed iao (位襖). The Ryō no shūge explains the iao as a garment made without a ran, a horizontal panel at the lower edge, and with the sides left open. By contrast, the Ryō no shūge contains no commentary directly describing the construction of the civil officials' “garment” at the sides or lower edge. (Note: Concerning the “garment” worn as the seifuku of civil officials, the Ryō no shūge states, 裁縫體制。一如朝服一也, indicating that its construction and tailoring were the same as those of the garment worn with chōfuku. A commentary quoted in the work as the 穴記 also states, 袍與衣不見其別也 (“no difference can be seen between the hō and the garment”). The garments worn with chōfuku and seifuku are therefore understood to have been of the same form, both being round-collared upper garments similar to the hō.) It is nevertheless thought to have belonged to the tradition of garments fitted with a ran at the lower edge and to have been a closed-sided robe, or hōeki no hō. Thus, civil and military officials in the Nara period wore structurally different forms of upper garment with their chōfuku. The institutions and forms associated with this court dress gradually changed during the Heian period.

=== Formation of the sokutai ===
During the early Heian period, military officials also came to be permitted to wear the hōeki no hō, whose sides were sewn closed, and the simple correspondence between civil or military status and the form of the robe gradually broke down. In 814, military officials of the Fifth Rank and above were permitted to wear both the hōeki no hō and the ketteki no hō, whose sides were left open. The Engishiki later prescribed that military officials of kugyō status wore the hōeki no hō; military officials of the Fourth and Fifth Ranks wore the ketteki no hō on ceremonial occasions involving arms and the hōeki no hō on other occasions; and those of the Sixth Rank and below wore the ketteki no hō. Thus, the form of the hō came to be determined not only by whether the wearer was a civil or military official, but also by court rank and whether ceremonial arms were worn. This system was inherited by the later sokutai.

The rank colours of the hō were likewise repeatedly revised during the early Heian period rather than simply preserving the provisions of the Nara-period clothing code. Changes recorded in the Shoku Nihongi, Nihon Kōki, Shoku Nihon Kōki, Nihon Sandai Jitsuroku, and Nihon Kiryaku indicate that a system eventually developed in which officials of the Fourth Rank and above wore black robes, those of the Fifth Rank wore scarlet, and those of the Sixth Rank and below wore green.

Few paintings directly depicting men's dress of the early Heian period survive, and almost no actual garments from the period remain. Several works of sculpture and painting, however, provide evidence from which its appearance may be reconstructed.

Two wooden statues of male deities preserved at Matsunoo-taisha, one depicting an elderly man and the other a younger adult, are believed to date from the ninth century. Their clothing is thought to reflect a transitional stage between the chōfuku of the ritsuryō system and the later sokutai, making them important evidence for reconstructing the appearance of early court dress.

Although they postdate the emergence of the early sokutai, relatively early and extensive pictorial sources include the painted doors of the Phoenix Hall at Byōdō-in, completed in 1053, and the Illustrated Biography of Prince Shōtoku, originally painted on screens for the Picture Hall at Hōryū-ji in 1072.

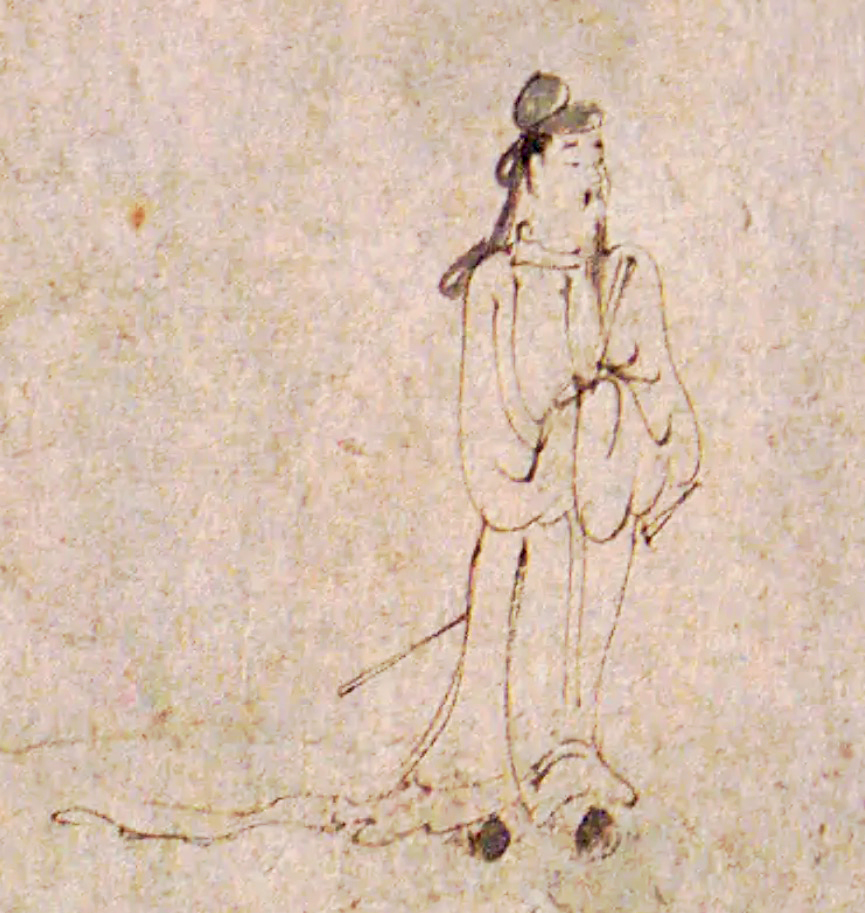
A figure wearing sokutai in the Shōgunzuka Emaki (13th century)

The Shōgunzuka Emaki, preserved at Kōzan-ji, dates from the thirteenth century but is regarded as a copy of a scroll originally produced during the Heian period. Although the date of the lost original is uncertain, the clothing and weapons depicted in the surviving copy preserve archaic features. Its figures in sokutai therefore provide further evidence for reconstructing the earlier form of the ensemble.

By comparing these statues and paintings with the legal and documentary sources discussed above, as well as with Tang-period paintings and archaeological finds, scholars have attempted to reconstruct men's court dress of the early Heian period. The hō appears to have been narrower in the body and sleeves than the later stiffened style known as kowa shōzoku, and therefore followed the outline of the body more closely. It was also apparently made longer than the wearer's height required, with the excess fabric at the hem gathered up at the waist when worn. Other elements, including the hanpi, court cap, hirao sash, and footwear, also differed in form or use from their later counterparts.

Through these institutional and structural changes, men's chōfuku became increasingly Japanized, and the sokutai is thought to have emerged by around the end of the ninth century. The new ensemble was a looser and more voluminous adaptation of ritsuryō court dress suited to the Japanese climate and the lifestyle of the aristocracy. At the same time, it retained the earlier function of court dress as a visible marker of status, particularly through the use of different colours of hō according to court rank.

=== Establishment of the sokutai and the rise of kowa shōzoku ===
From the tenth century onward, the sokutai became the standard official attire of the Heian aristocracy. Courtiers attending ceremonies, observances, or administrative business at the imperial court were, in principle, required to wear a sokutai with an ihō, an outer robe whose colour indicated the wearer's court rank. Depending on the setting and the nature of their duties, however, aristocrats distinguished among several forms of dress, including the sokutai, hōko, ikan, nōshi, and hoi. The sokutai was the full formal attire; hōko and ikan served as official dress when the full ensemble was not required; nōshi was private attire; and hoi was ordinary everyday clothing.

The older ceremonial dress known as raifuku had originally been worn for major state ceremonies, including chōga, the formal New Year's audience at which officials paid homage to the emperor. During the Heian period, however, its use became increasingly restricted, and it eventually survived mainly as specialized attire for ceremonies such as an imperial enthronement. The sokutai, by contrast, became established as the formal dress of male court nobles for imperial ceremonies and official business.

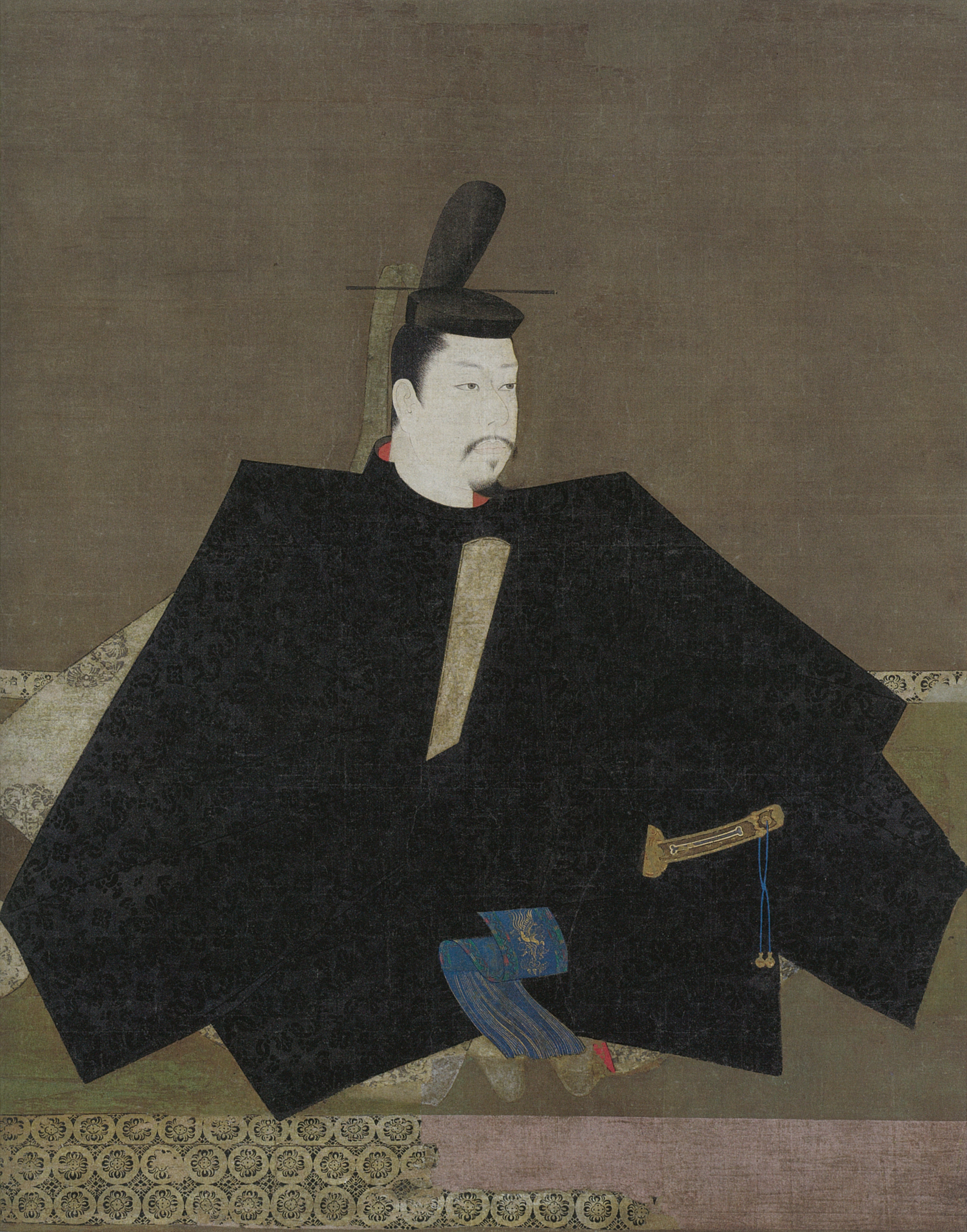
Sokutai in the stiffened kowa shōzoku style, as seen in the traditionally identified portrait of Minamoto no Yoritomo (13th century)

During the period of cloistered rule in the late Heian period, stiff fabrics came into use through the employment of heavy weaves and processes such as ita-biki, in which starch paste was used to give silk greater body and rigidity. These materials produced a more angular and rigid silhouette, leading to the development and popularity of the style known as kowa shōzoku (強装束, “stiff court dress”). By contrast, the earlier style, in which layers of lighter fabrics created a softer and more flowing outline, was known as nae shōzoku (萎装束), also written 柔装束 (“soft court dress”).

The sokutai was the form of court dress most strongly affected by the development of kowa shōzoku. Although the overall composition of the ensemble remained largely unchanged, many of its individual components underwent alterations in form and construction. The stiffened style did not begin to appear clearly in illustrated handscrolls and other pictorial sources until the Kamakura period (1185–1333).

=== Development of yūsoku kojitsu and the revival of court dress ===
From the late Heian period onward, yūsoku kojitsu—the body of knowledge concerning precedents, conventions, and ceremonial procedures at the imperial court—developed alongside the accumulation of ritual manuals, treatises on court precedent, and court diaries. During the period of cloistered rule, matters relating specifically to court dress emerged as a distinct field, and specialized dress manuals known as shōzoku-shō (装束抄) were compiled. Hereditary schools of emon-dō (衣紋道), the art of dressing courtiers in formal robes, also took shape. The Ōinomikado school was known during the Kamakura period, while the Yamashina and Takakura schools became established from the Nanboku-chō period (1336–1392) onward.

From the late Muromachi period (1336–1573) through the Sengoku period (c. 1467–1615), many court observances became empty formalities or ceased altogether, and yūsoku kojitsu consequently declined. During the Azuchi–Momoyama period (1568–1600), however, Toyotomi Hideyoshi and Toyotomi Hidetsugu, both of whom became kampaku, revived large-scale court ceremonies. In the early Edo period (1603–1868), Emperor Go-Mizunoo continued this process by restoring ceremonies such as imperial progresses and the formal entry of imperial consorts into the palace. Knowledge concerning palace buildings, court dress, palanquins and carriages, and ceremonial procedure therefore had to be reconstructed. Because the resulting practices often differed from those recorded in older sources, they later became known as Kan'ei yūsoku (寛永有職) or kinsei yūsoku (近世有職, “early-modern court precedent”). Court dress likewise acquired forms that differed from earlier practice.

To correct discrepancies between Kan'ei yūsoku and older precedents preserved in court records, the Kyoto court nobility increasingly undertook textual study and historical reconstruction from the later seventeenth century onward. This movement was led in particular by a circle of court nobles around Konoe Motohiro, who served as kampaku during the reign of Emperor Higashiyama. The Daijō-e, the great enthronement harvest rite, was revived in 1687, followed by the Kamo Festival in 1694.

The revival of court ceremonies and yūsoku kojitsu also extended to aristocratic dress, which was reconstructed on the basis of the stiffened kowa shōzoku style of the Kamakura period. In connection with the revival of the Daijō-e, the technique of weaving unpatterned ra silk gauze, used for formal court caps such as the kanmuri, was also restored. The revival of yūsoku kojitsu reached its height during the reign of Emperor Kōmei in the Bakumatsu period (1853–1868). After the Meiji Restoration of 1868, however, the Westernization of the imperial court and the adoption of Western-style clothing meant that the sokutai and other forms of traditional court dress became largely confined to ceremonies of the Imperial Household and rites performed at Shinto shrines.

== Use ==
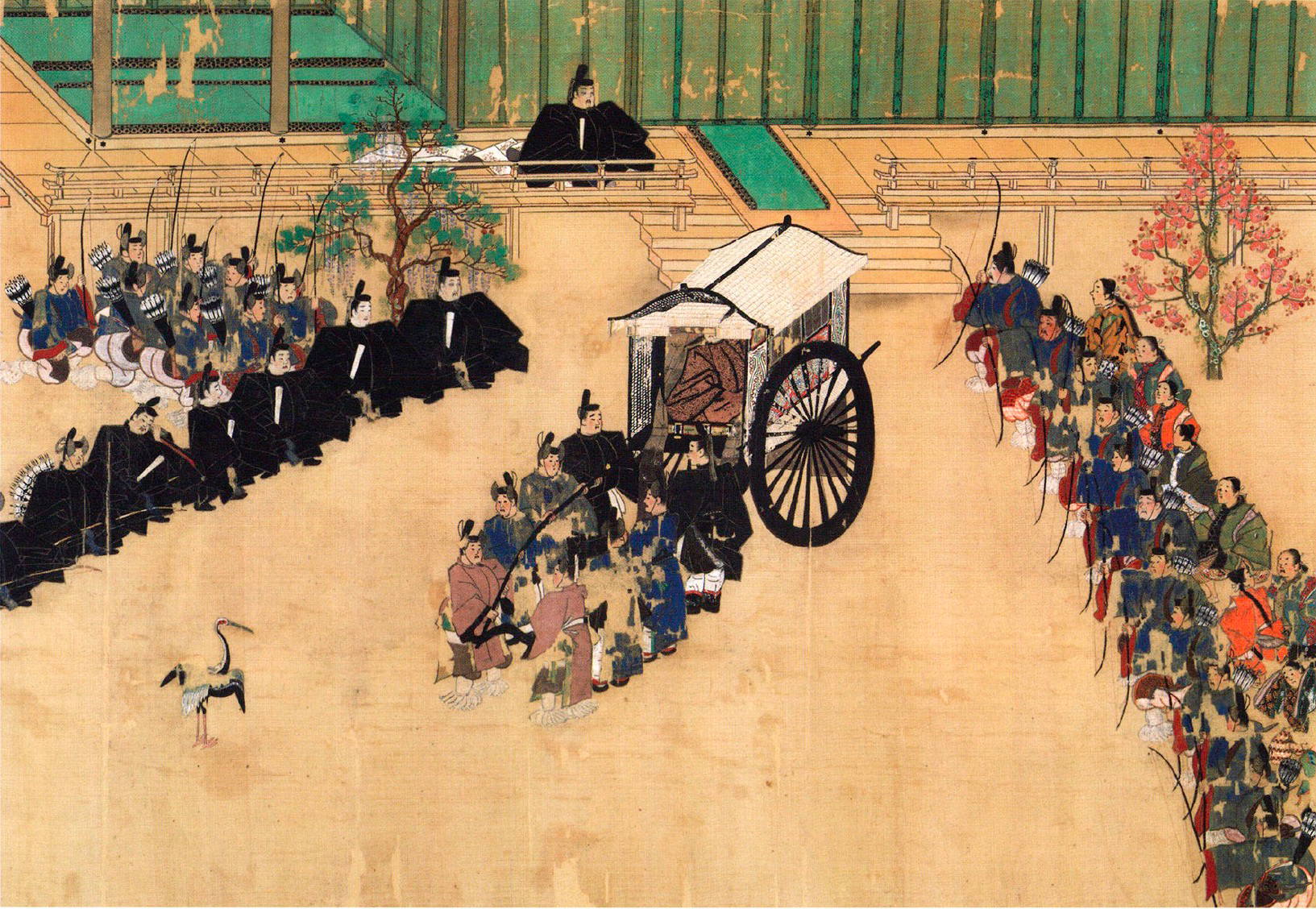
Retired Emperor Shirakawa’s visit to Kasuga Shrine. Around the ox-drawn carriage are court nobles and civil officials in sokutai, together with military officials carrying bows and arrows. From Scroll 2 of the Kasuga Gongen Genki-e, early 14th century.

Aristocratic officials of the Heian period were, in principle, expected to wear sokutai when attending the imperial palace. Diaries such as the Midō Kanpakuki, Shōyūki, and Go-Nijō Moromichi-ki contain numerous entries describing courtiers putting on sokutai before proceeding to court.

Because the sokutai consisted of numerous garments and accessories, dressing in the full ensemble required considerable time. An entry in the Shōyūki for the twenty-third day of the eleventh month of Kankō 2 (1005) records that Fujiwara no Sanesuke, while changing into sokutai before going to the palace, kept a visitor waiting and had food served to him in the meantime.

Exceptions were sometimes tolerated in emergencies. When the imperial palace had been destroyed by fire, for example, courtiers could be permitted to attend court in nōshi, normally a form of private dress. During the period of cloistered rule, regents and chief advisers who had received imperial authorization to wear nōshi, as well as senior nobles entering the palace as envoys of a retired emperor, also sometimes appeared at court in that attire. Even in such cases, however, they could change into sokutai in their assigned quarters or lodgings within the palace before taking part in a ceremony in the emperor's presence.

At ceremonies held in the Daigokuden, such as the New Year's court audience and the Gosai-e Buddhist observance, and at seasonal court assemblies held in the Shishinden, senior nobles and courtiers with access to the imperial presence stood or sat in sokutai with rank-coloured outer robes. Ritual manuals did not always state explicitly that sokutai was to be worn, because its use at ordinary court ceremonies was regarded as self-evident. Officials conducting government business at the jin-no-za, the council chamber of the senior nobility, likewise wore rank-coloured sokutai; these included senior nobles, chamberlains, officials of the Board of Controllers, and secretaries of the Council of State.

In settings of a more private character, such as the residences of a kampaku or minister, dress varied according to status and convenience. Senior nobles might wear nōshi, while lesser courtiers might appear in either ikan or sokutai. Within court society, the sokutai therefore served not only as formal attire but also as a visible indication of the public nature of the setting, the wearer's rank, and the official character of his duties.

The ensemble was also worn by members of the warrior class. The shogun and other warriors holding the Fifth Court Rank or higher wore sokutai on major ceremonial occasions.

== Components ==
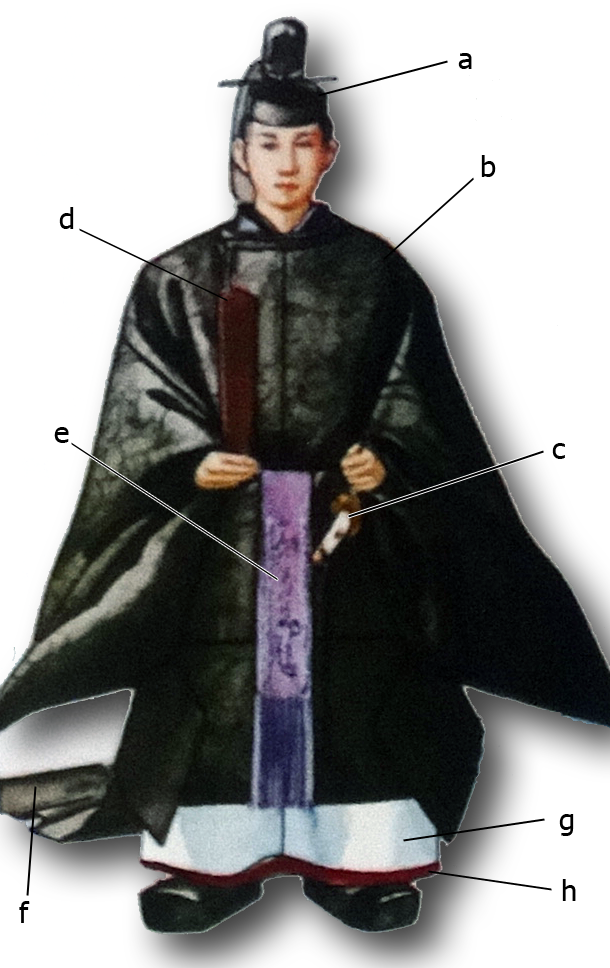
Principal components of the sokutai

The following are the principal components of a typical sokutai worn by a civil official:

- a: suiei no kanmuri, a court cap with a pendant ei
- b: hō, the outer robe
- c: kazari-tachi, a ceremonial sword
- d: shaku, a ritual baton
- e: hirao, a flat ornamental sash
- f: the train of the shitagasane
- g: ue no hakama, the outer trousers
- h: ōguchi-bakama, wide-legged inner trousers

In the sokutai of a civil official, the upper-body garments were layered, from innermost to outermost, in the following order: hitoe, akome, shitagasane, hanpi, and hō. The ōguchi-bakama were worn as the inner trousers, with the ue no hakama placed over them.

The hō was a round-necked robe with a horizontal panel called a ran attached around the lower hem. Its collar was fastened with a cord known as a tombo.

A decorated leather belt called a sekitai was fastened over the hō, and a kanmuri was worn on the head. The feet were covered with shitōzu, a type of cloth sock. The wearer held a shaku and carried folded paper known as tatō together with a hiōgi, or cypress-wood fan. Senior nobles and courtiers admitted to the emperor's presence suspended a gyotai, an ornamental status insignia, from the waist.

For full ceremonial dress, civil officials authorized to bear arms wore a sword, while military officials carried a sword together with a bow and arrows. Footwear consisted of either boots or shallow court shoes known as asagutsu.

In the armed sokutai of a military official, a side-opening ketteki no hō was worn over the hanpi, shitagasane, akome, hitoe, ue no hakama, and ōguchi-bakama, together with boots. The wearer also fastened a sekitai and hirao around the waist, wore a sword, carried arrows in a flat quiver called a hira-yanagui, and held a bow.

== Indication of status ==
The sokutai visibly expressed the wearer's rank and position. The colour of the hō was prescribed according to court rank and was known as the ishiki (“rank colour”); a robe in the appropriate colour was called an ihō (“rank robe”). In this respect, the sokutai continued the status-marking function of the earlier chōfuku. At court ceremonies, observances, and administrative proceedings, aristocratic officials were in principle required to wear sokutai with an ihō.

The rank colours of the hō were based on those prescribed by the clothing provisions of the ritsuryō codes, but were repeatedly revised between the Nara and Heian periods. By the early Heian period, a system had developed in which officials of the Fourth Rank and above wore black robes, those of the Fifth Rank wore scarlet, and those of the Sixth Rank and below wore green.

The regulations most strictly observed were those governing the readily visible ihō and the materials and woven designs of such underlying garments as the ue no hakama, shitagasane, and hanpi. The ihō reflected the court-rank system inherited from the ritsuryō state, while the fabrics and patterns of the undergarments expressed distinctions that developed within Heian court society among senior court nobles, courtiers admitted to the emperor's presence, and lower-ranking officials without such access.

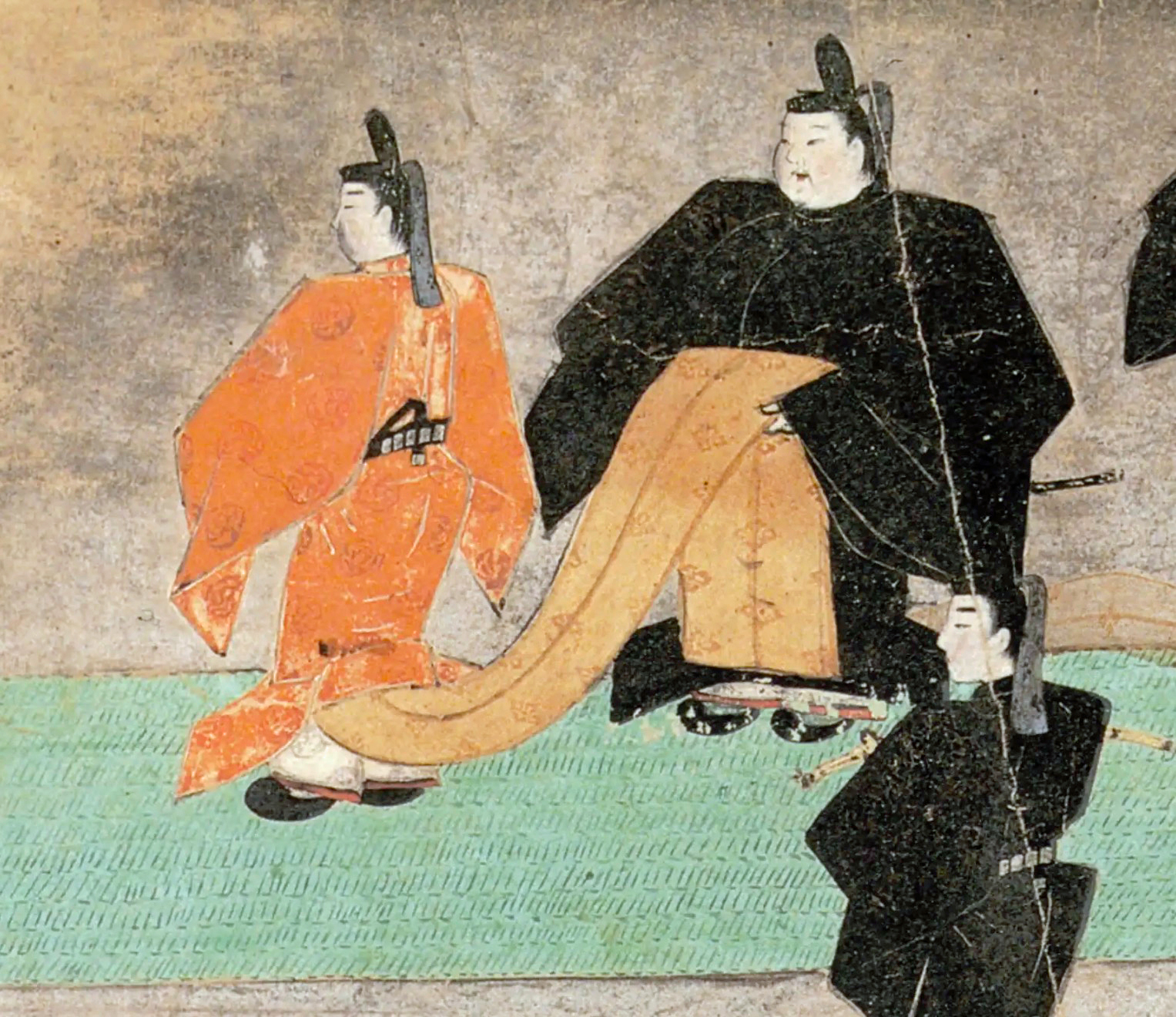
Crown Prince Atsunaga (later Emperor Go-Suzaku) wearing sokutai with an ōni no hō. From the Komakurabe Gyōkō Emaki, Kamakura period, late 13th to early 14th century.

The emperor, crown prince, and subjects were likewise distinguished by the colour and woven design of the hō. The emperor wore the kōrozen no gohō, an outer robe in a distinctive yellow-brown colour reserved for the sovereign. Its woven design originally consisted of paulownia, bamboo, and phoenix motifs; in later periods, qilin motifs were added, producing the paulownia–bamboo–phoenix–qilin pattern. The crown prince wore the ōni no hō, distinguished by its yellowish-red colour and a design of Chinese-style birds within six-lobed floral motifs. A retired emperor, by contrast, had no exclusive rank colour and could wear red, blue-green, black, or other colours as appropriate.

== Characteristics ==
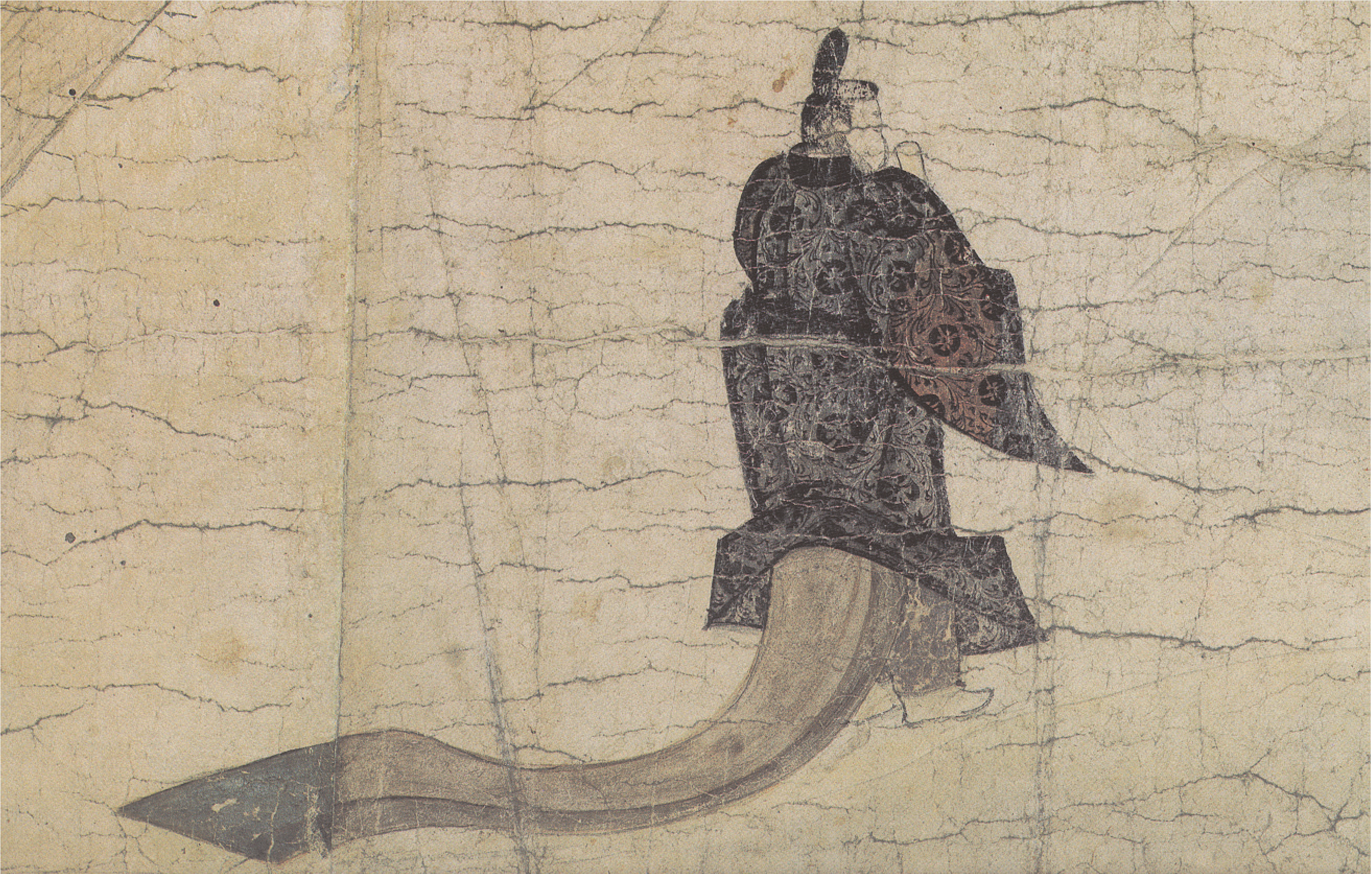
A figure in sokutai trailing the long train of the shitagasane, as depicted in the Ban Dainagon Ekotoba (12th century)

One of the most distinctive features of the sokutai was the elongated back panel of the shitagasane, which formed a train trailing behind the wearer. This train was known as the kyo (裾). Originally, it was an extension of the back of the shitagasane itself. For ease of handling and dressing, however, the train was later made as a separate piece fitted with cords and attached to the garment; this form was known as the betsukyo (別裾, “separate train”). The original form, in which the train remained continuous with the shitagasane, was called the tsuzukikyo (続裾, “attached train”).

The length of the train also served as an indication of status and tended to increase with the wearer's rank. From the late Heian period onward, as court garments became larger and their sleeves wider, the train of the shitagasane also became increasingly long. It was folded while the wearer was seated; when walking, it could be allowed to trail behind, hooked over the sekitai or sword, or carried by an attendant. A comparatively short train was known as a saijaku (纔著).

The hanpi was worn beneath the hō and over the shitagasane, but in the sokutai of civil officials it could be omitted depending on the period and season. It was normally omitted from the early-modern form of the civil official's sokutai, whereas senior court nobles wearing winter sokutai during the Heian period did not necessarily dispense with it.

== Relationship to ikan and nōshi ==
The ikan was an abbreviated form of official court dress derived from the sokutai and was worn on public occasions when the full formal ensemble was not required. Compared with the sokutai, it omitted such elements as the shitagasane, sekitai, sword, and shitōzu, while the ue no hakama were replaced by sashinuki, gathered trousers tied at the ankles.

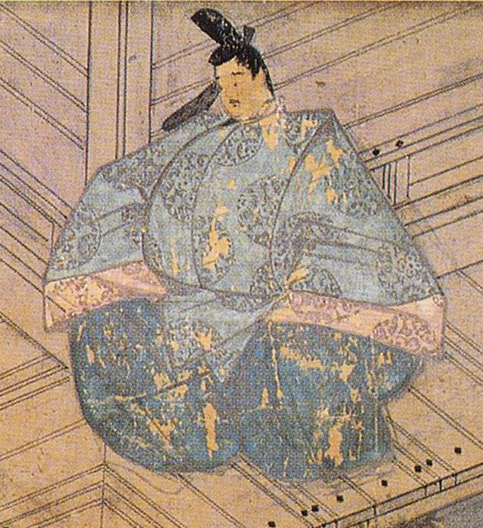
Fujiwara no Michinaga wearing nōshi, as depicted in the Murasaki Shikibu Diary Emaki (13th century)

The nōshi was originally private attire, although it could also be worn in official settings depending on the wearer's status or by special imperial permission. The sokutai remained the prescribed dress for attendance at the palace and participation in court ceremonies, but nōshi could be permitted in exceptional circumstances, such as after the imperial palace had been destroyed by fire. It was also sometimes worn by senior nobles entering the palace as envoys of a retired emperor, or by a regent or kampaku who had received formal authorization to appear at court in nōshi. Even in such cases, courtiers could change from nōshi into sokutai before participating in a ceremony in the emperor's presence or undertaking official duties in the palace audience chambers.

== Sokutai of the emperor and crown prince ==
The emperor also wore sokutai, but his ensemble was distinguished from those worn by his subjects. After undergoing genpuku, the traditional male coming-of-age ceremony, the emperor did not wear an eboshi; his only formal headgear was the kanmuri. Accordingly, he wore either sokutai or kanmuri-nōshi, a form of nōshi worn with the formal court cap. In the distinction between civil and military styles, the emperor's sokutai followed the civil form.

The colour and woven design of the emperor's hō were also distinctive. In 820, kōrozen, a yellow-brown colour reserved for the sovereign, was prescribed for the outer robe worn by the emperor at first-day audiences and at major and minor court assemblies. It thereafter became the emperor's rank colour. The woven design of the kōrozen no gohō originally consisted of paulownia, bamboo, and phoenix motifs distributed across the entire robe. Between the Kamakura and Muromachi periods, qilin motifs were added, and the paulownia–bamboo–phoenix–qilin design came to be arranged in box-like units. The crown prince wore an ōni no hō, an outer robe of yellowish-red colour decorated with Chinese-style birds enclosed within six-lobed floral motifs.

Before undergoing genpuku, an emperor, crown prince, or retired emperor did not wear a kanmuri, even when dressed in sokutai. The dress of underage male members of the imperial family could instead combine a side-opening ketteki no hō with a black ceremonial head covering known as a kūchō kokusaku (空頂黒幘).

== Surviving examples ==
Most surviving examples of sokutai date from the Edo period or later, although some ensembles dedicated to Shinto shrines and subsequently preserved as sacred treasures can be traced back to the Nanboku-chō and Muromachi periods.

Among the ancient sacred treasures dedicated to Kumano Hayatama Taisha by Ashikaga Yoshimitsu in 1390, a group designated a National Treasure, the robe catalogued as 袍 萌黄浮線綾丸文固綾 (“hō of greenish-yellow stiff twill with circular fusenryō motifs”) is thought to correspond to the following entry under “one complete sokutai ensemble” in the shrine inventory: 御袍一領 麹塵丸文浮線綾、裏紫遠菱平綾、中部上絹 (“one hō of kikujin-coloured silk with circular fusenryō motifs, lined in purple plain twill with a distant-lozenge pattern, with upper-grade silk in the central section”).

The kikujin no hō was a robe worn by the emperor and retired emperors. Its colour was classed as a forbidden court colour, and among subjects it could be worn only by a kurōdo, or imperial chamberlain, who had received permission from the emperor. On this basis, the surviving robe is thought to have been dedicated to Kumano Hayatama Taisha not as shinpuku, clothing intended for a deity, but as part of a sokutai ensemble. It is regarded as the oldest surviving kikujin no hō and is also valuable as a rare surviving hō from before the decline of yūsoku kojitsu, the study and transmission of court precedent, during the Sengoku period.

Other items recorded under the heading “sokutai” in the shrine inventories have also been identified as corresponding to surviving objects. In the table below, Naka Gozen Hayatama-no-miya refers to the second sanctuary of Kumano Hayatama Taisha. Asuka-no-miya refers to Asuka Shrine, an auxiliary shrine situated outside the main precincts of Kumano Hayatama Taisha. The group of ancient sacred treasures formerly belonging to Asuka Shrine, also designated a National Treasure, became state property in 1955 and is now held by the Kyoto National Museum.

The inventory heading “sokutai” includes not only components of the ensemble itself but also such items as nōshi, jade pendants, bedding, boxes for court caps and ritual batons, clothing chests, and wrapping cloths. The following table is therefore not a list of the constituent parts of a sokutai, but a comparison between the items grouped under “sokutai” in the shrine inventories and the surviving objects. A circle marks an item that Asano et al. (1968) considered likely to correspond to a surviving object. A blank cell indicates only that their table did not place a circle beside that item.

Items listed under “sokutai” in the shrine inventories and corresponding surviving objects
Item	Naka Gozen Hayatama-no-miya (second sanctuary of Kumano Hayatama Taisha)	Asuka-no-miya (Asuka Shrine)
Kanmuri (court cap)	○	○
Court-cap box	○	○
Hō	○	
Nōshi		○
Hanpi		
Shitagasane		
Akome		
Robe (衣)		
Hitoe	○	○
Hakama	○	
Ōguchi-bakama	○	
Jade pendants	○	
Sekitai		○
Sash		○
Bedding quilt		
Shaku and shaku box		
Fan		
Shitōzu (cloth socks)	○	○
Court shoes	○	○
Wrapping cloth (入帷)		
Flat wrapping cloth (平褁)		
Clothing chest	○	○

Atsuta Shrine preserves three Muromachi-period shitagasane worn with sokutai, together with three corresponding separate trains. All are of the betsukyo type, in which the train was made separately from the body of the shitagasane. The shrine also preserves three pairs of outer trousers catalogued as 表袴 白窠霰文二重織 (“white double-woven ue no hakama with ka-arare motifs”), which form part of the group of “Ancient Sacred Treasures” designated an Important Cultural Property. Each is a double-woven textile with a white ground and ka-arare motifs in dark purple, pale purple, and greenish yellow. Such multicoloured patterning is unusual for ue no hakama worn with sokutai.

A manuscript of the Atsuta Kyūki dated 1699 records that in 1458 Ashikaga Yoshimasa dedicated garments for the five deities of Atsuta's main sanctuary, together with five karabitsu, or lidded storage chests. (Note: The original reads: 一 長禄二年公方義政公被献正殿五神御衣并御唐櫃五合.) The Owari-shi, completed in 1843, also quotes this passage. The five deities of the main sanctuary are identified as Amaterasu, Susanoo, Yamato Takeru, Miyazu-hime-no-Mikoto, and Takeinadane-no-Mikoto.

The surviving garments are generally dated to around 1458. On the basis of their types and quantities, they are thought to have been made for three male and two female deities, with the three pairs of ue no hakama corresponding to the three male deities.

== Gallery ==
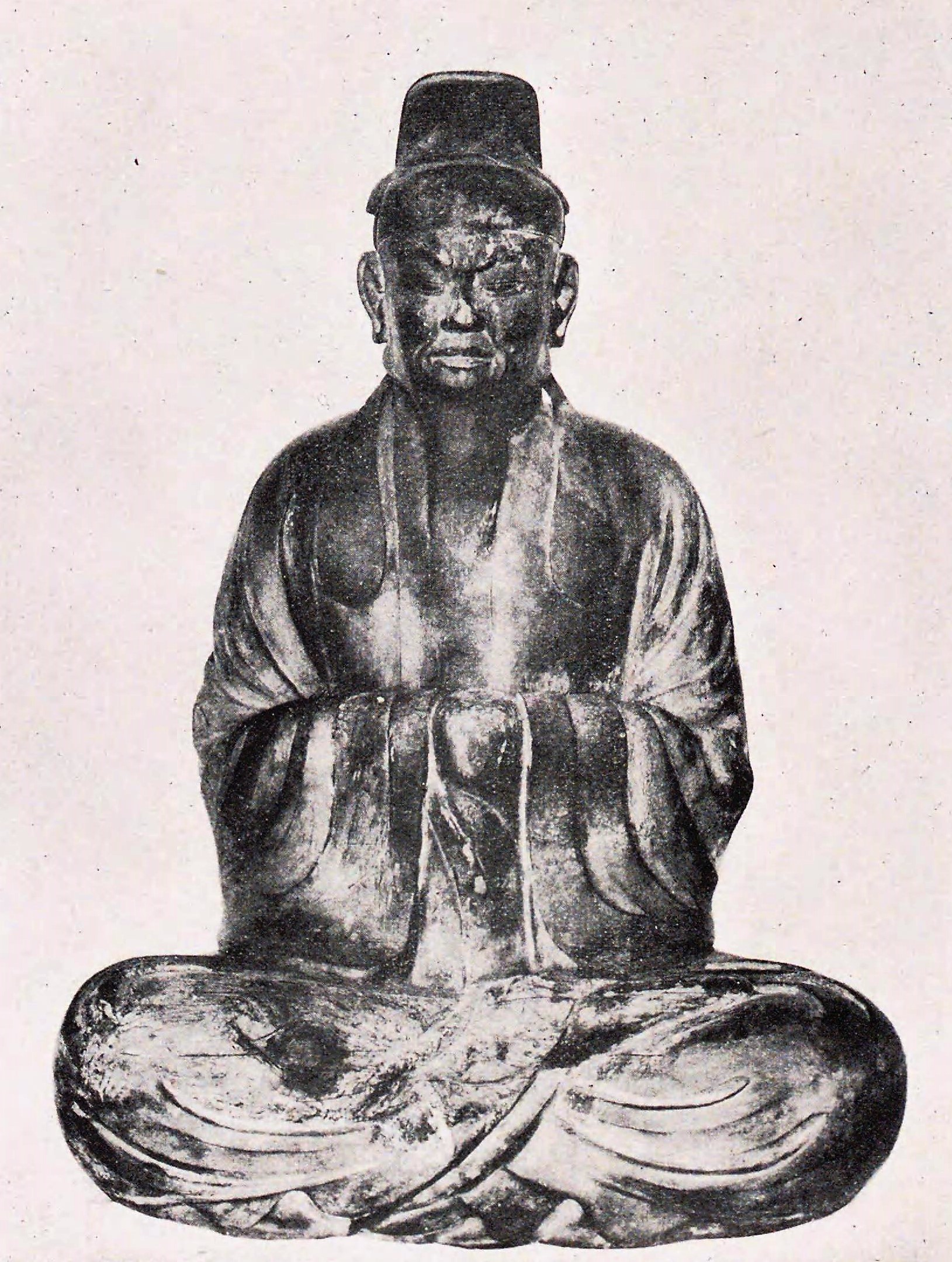
Wooden seated statue of a male deity, depicting an elderly figure, at Matsunoo-taisha

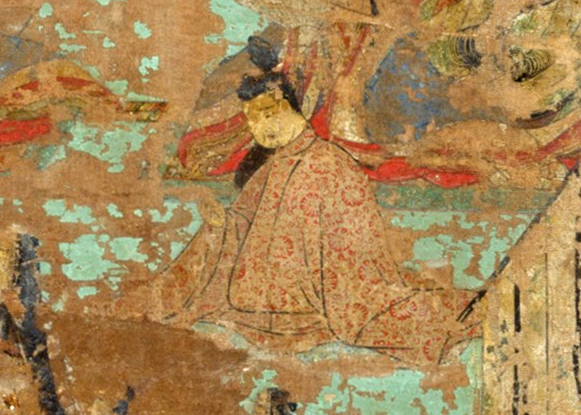
Prince Shōtoku depicted in sokutai in the Illustrated Biography of Prince Shōtoku

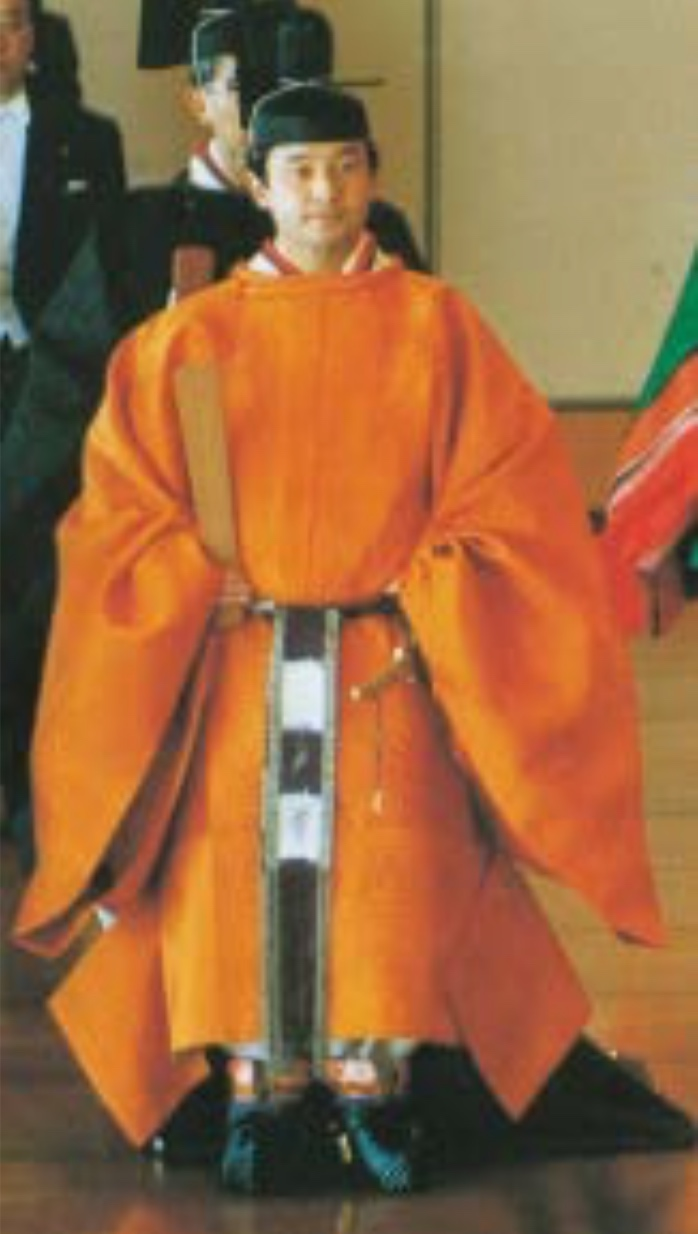
Naruhito wearing sokutai while crown prince

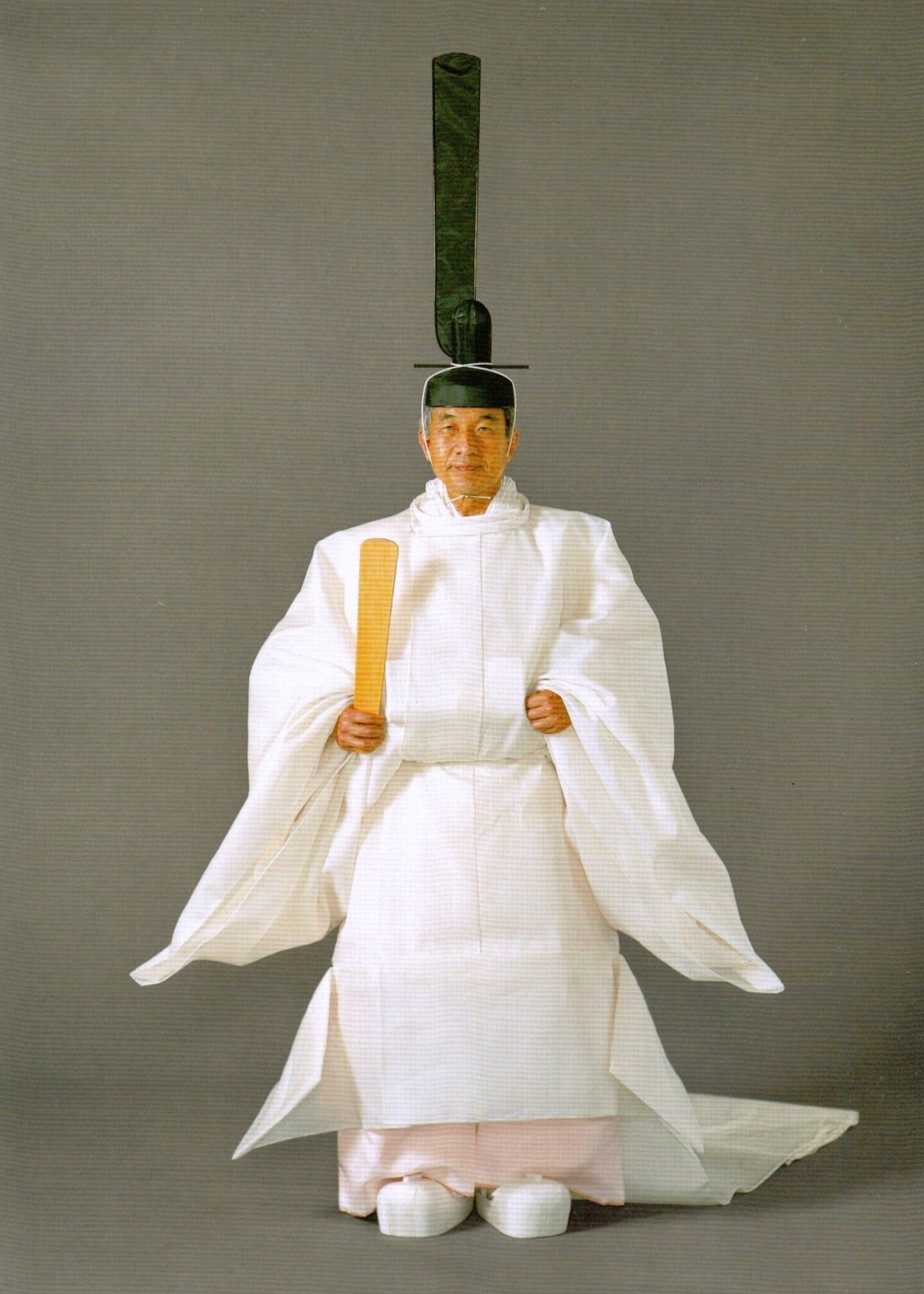
Emperor Akihito wearing the haku no gohō, a white ceremonial robe

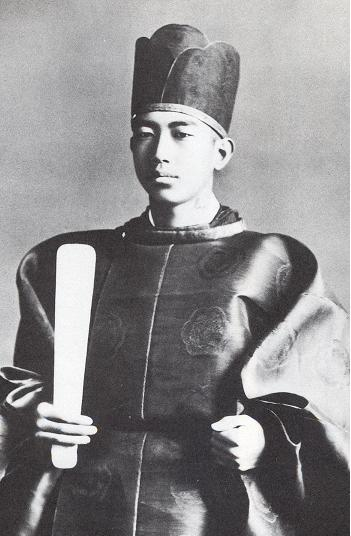
Prince Hirohito (later Emperor Shōwa) wearing a ketteki no hō and kūchō kokusaku
