= 583 =

Calendar year

583 in various calendars
- Gregorian calendar: 583; DLXXXIII
- Ab urbe condita: 1336
- Armenian calendar: 32; ԹՎ ԼԲ
- Assyrian calendar: 5333
- Balinese saka calendar: 504–505
- Bengali calendar: −11 – −10
- Berber calendar: 1533
- Buddhist calendar: 1127
- Burmese calendar: −55
- Byzantine calendar: 6091–6092
- Chinese calendar: 壬寅年 (Water Tiger); 3280 or 3073 — to — 癸卯年 (Water Rabbit); 3281 or 3074
- Coptic calendar: 299–300
- Discordian calendar: 1749
- Ethiopian calendar: 575–576
- Hebrew calendar: 4343–4344
- Hindu calendars
- Vikram Samvat: 639–640
- Shaka Samvat: 504–505
- Kali Yuga: 3683–3684
- Holocene calendar: 10583
- Iranian calendar: 39 BP – 38 BP
- Islamic calendar: 40 BH – 39 BH
- Javanese calendar: 472–473
- Julian calendar: 583; DLXXXIII
- Korean calendar: 2916
- Minguo calendar: 1329 before ROC 民前1329年
- Nanakshahi calendar: −885
- Seleucid era: 894/895 AG
- Thai solar calendar: 1125–1126
- Tibetan calendar: ཆུ་ཕོ་སྟག་ལོ་ (male Water-Tiger); 709 or 328 or −444 — to — ཆུ་མོ་ཡོས་ལོ་ (female Water-Hare); 710 or 329 or −443

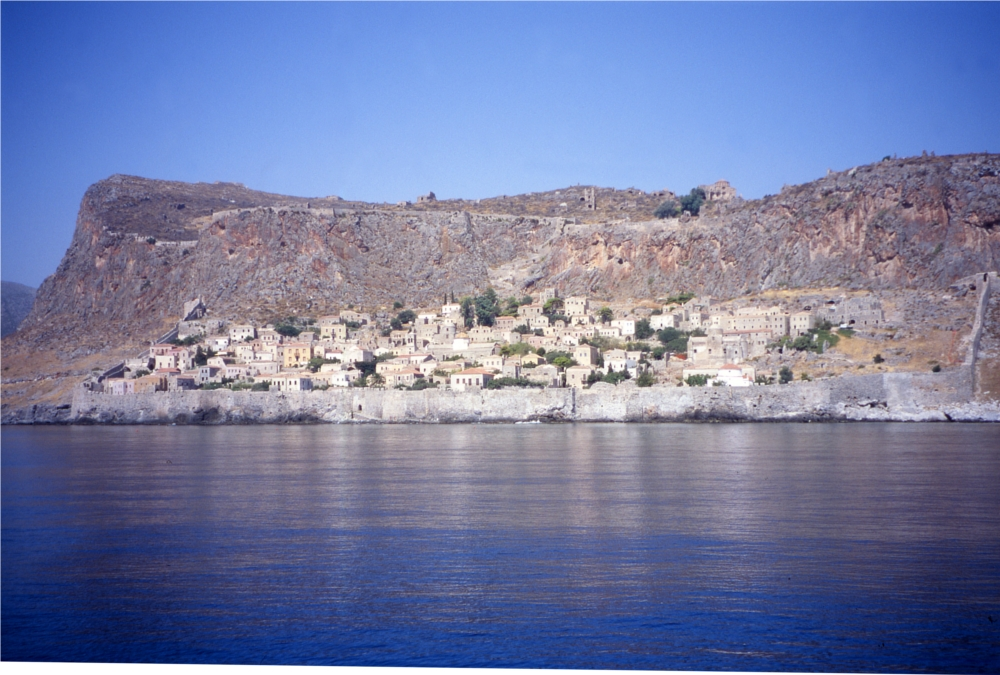
View of Monemvasia (Peloponnese)

Year 583 (DLXXXIII) was a common year starting on Friday of the Julian calendar. The denomination 583 for this year has been used since the early medieval period, when the Anno Domini calendar era became the prevalent method in Europe for naming years.

== Events ==
=== By place ===
==== Byzantine Empire ====
- Emperor Maurice decides to end the annual tribute to the Avars, a mounted people who have swept across Russia and threatened the Balkan Peninsula. They capture the cities of Singidunum (modern Belgrade) and Viminacium (Moesia).

==== Europe ====
- King Liuvigild lays siege to Seville (Southern Spain), and forms an alliance with the Byzantines. He summons his rebellious son Hermenegild back to Toledo, and forces him to abandon the Chalcedonian Faith.
- The city of Monemvasia (Peloponnese) is founded by people seeking refuge from the Slavs and Avars.
- Eboric (also called Euric) succeeds his father Miro as king of the Suevi (Hispania Gallaecia).

==== Arabia ====
- Muhammad, age 12, accompanies his uncle Abu Talib during trading journeys to Syria.

==== Mesoamerica ====
- Yohl Ikʼnal succeeds Kan Bahlam I as queen of the Maya city of Palenque (Mexico).

=== By topic ===
==== Medicine ====
- Smallpox begins spreading from China to Japan and Korea (approximate date).

== Births ==
- Abu Ubaidah, companion of Muhammad (d. 639)
- Liuva II, king of the Visigoths (d. 603)
- Theodosius, Byzantine co-emperor (approximate date)
- Umar, companion of Muhammad (d. 644) and second Caliph of Rashidun Caliphate
- Xiao Xian, prince of the Liang dynasty (d. 621)

== Deaths ==
- February 1 – Kan Bahlam I, ruler of Palenque (b. 524)
- Miro, king of the Suevi
