= 603 =

Calendar year

603 in various calendars
- Gregorian calendar: 603; DCIII
- Ab urbe condita: 1356
- Armenian calendar: 52; ԹՎ ԾԲ
- Assyrian calendar: 5353
- Balinese saka calendar: 524–525
- Bengali calendar: 9–10
- Berber calendar: 1553
- Buddhist calendar: 1147
- Burmese calendar: −35
- Byzantine calendar: 6111–6112
- Chinese calendar: 壬戌年 (Water Dog); 3300 or 3093 — to — 癸亥年 (Water Pig); 3301 or 3094
- Coptic calendar: 319–320
- Discordian calendar: 1769
- Ethiopian calendar: 595–596
- Hebrew calendar: 4363–4364
- Hindu calendars
- Vikram Samvat: 659–660
- Shaka Samvat: 524–525
- Kali Yuga: 3703–3704
- Holocene calendar: 10603
- Iranian calendar: 19 BP – 18 BP
- Islamic calendar: 20 BH – 19 BH
- Japanese calendar: N/A
- Javanese calendar: 492–493
- Julian calendar: 603; DCIII
- Korean calendar: 2936
- Minguo calendar: 1309 before ROC 民前1309年
- Nanakshahi calendar: −865
- Seleucid era: 914/915 AG
- Thai solar calendar: 1145–1146
- Tibetan calendar: ཆུ་ཕོ་ཁྱི་ལོ་ (male Water-Dog); 729 or 348 or −424 — to — ཆུ་མོ་ཕག་ལོ་ (female Water-Boar); 730 or 349 or −423

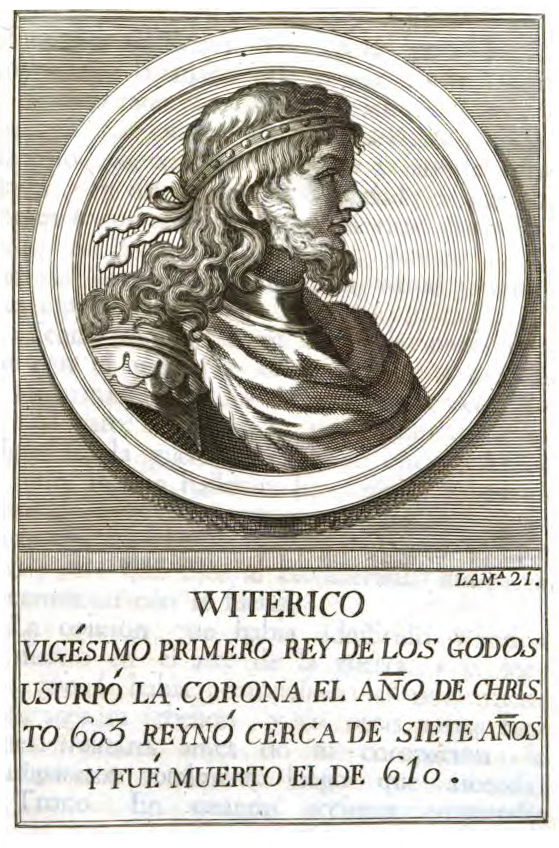
King Witteric (c. 565–610)

Year 603 (DCIII) was a common year starting on Tuesday of the Julian calendar. The denomination 603 for this year has been used since the early medieval period, when the Anno Domini calendar era became the prevalent method in Europe for naming years.

== Events ==
=== By place ===
==== Europe ====
- Spring – Witteric, counting on the support of the nobles, attacks the royal palace in Toledo, and overthrows King Liuva II. He cuts off his right hand, and has him executed. Witteric becomes the new king of the Visigoths.
- King Agilulf besieges Cremona, and with the assistance of the Slavs the city is destroyed. He captures Padua and Mantua (Northern Italy); its territory is divided between the Lombard duchies of Brescia and Bergamo.
- Agilulf, under the influence of his wife Theodelinda, abandons Arianism for Catholicism, and is (with his son Adaloald) baptised in the Cathedral of Monza, where later the Iron Crown of Lombardy is installed.
- The last mention of the Roman Senate on the Italian mainland is made (according to the Gregorian register). It mentions that the Senate has acclaimed new statues of Emperor Phocas and Empress Leontia.

==== Britain ====
- Battle of Degsastan: King Æthelfrith of Northumbria defeats the combined forces of the Strathclyde Britons and Scots under Áedán mac Gabráin, establishing the supremacy of the Angles in the northern part of what will become known as the British Isles.

==== Asia ====
- Emperor Wéndi stabilises the Chinese Empire; the agricultural acreage increases greatly, and shipbuilding technology reaches a new high level.
- Prince Shōtoku of Japan establishes a twelve level cap and rank system, and is said to have authored a seventeen-article constitution.
- Rebellious Göktürks depose and kill the ambitious ruler (khagan) Tardu, of the Western Turkic Khaganate (Central Asia).
- Heshana Khan succeeds his father Tardu as ruler of the Göktürks, and levies heavy taxes on the Tiele people.

=== By topic ===
==== Religion ====
- Schuttern Abbey (Germany) is founded by the wandering Irish monk Offo.
- The future Pope Boniface III is appointed papal legate to Constantinople.

== Births ==
- Abu al-Aswad al-Du'ali, Muslim scholar (approximate date)
- Dagobert I, king of the Franks (d. 639)
- Li Daozong, prince of the Tang dynasty (approximate date)
- Li Yuanji, prince of the Tang dynasty (d. 626)
- Pacal the Great, ruler (ajaw) of Palenque (d. 683)
- Muyeol, king of Silla (Korea) (d. 661)
- Yŏn Kaesomun, dictator of Goguryeo (d. 666)

== Deaths ==
- Fintan of Clonenagh, Irish abbot
- Liuva II, king of the Visigoths (b. 583)
- Mungo, Brythonic bishop (or 614)
- Tardu, ruler (khagan) of the Göktürks
