= Twelve Level Cap and Rank System =

Cap and rank systems established during the Asuka period

The Twelve Level Cap and Rank System (冠位十二階, Kan'i Jūnikai), established in 603 AD, was the first of what would be several similar cap and rank systems established during the Asuka period of Japanese history. It was adapted from similar systems that were already in place in Sui dynasty China, Paekche and Goguryeo. The officials wore silk caps that were decorated with gold and silver, and a feather that indicated the official's rank. The ranks in the twelve level cap and rank system consisted of the greater and the lesser of each of the six Confucian virtues: virtue (徳, toku), benevolence (仁, jin), propriety (禮, rei), sincerity (信, shin), justice (義, gi) and knowledge (智, chi).

The twelve cap system was replaced in 647.

== Innovations ==
The primary distinction between this new system and the old kabane system by which a person's rank was determined based on heredity, was that the cap and rank system allowed for promotion based on merit and individual achievement. One of the more well known examples of promotion within the cap and rank system is that of Ono no Imoko. When Imoko was first sent as an envoy to the Sui court in 607, he was ranked Greater Propriety (5th rank), but he was eventually promoted to the top rank of Greater Virtue because of his achievements, particularly during his second trip to Sui in 608.

== Ranks and colors ==
The following table lists the various ranks and the colors that were believed to have been assigned to each one.

Rank	Kanji	Romaji	English	Color

1	大徳	Daitoku	Greater Virtue	Deep Purple

2	小徳	Shōtoku	Lesser Virtue	Light Purple

3	大仁	Daijin	Greater Benevolence	Deep Blue

4	小仁	Shōjin	Lesser Benevolence	Light Blue

5	大礼	Dairei	Greater Propriety	Deep Red

6	小礼	Shōrei	Lesser Propriety	Light Red

7	大信	Daishin	Greater Sincerity	Deep Yellow

8	小信	Shōshin	Lesser Sincerity	Light Yellow

9	大義	Daigi	Greater Justice	Deep White

10	小義	Shōgi	Lesser Justice	Light White

11	大智	Daichi	Greater Knowledge	Deep Black

12	小智	Shōchi	Lesser Knowledge	Light Black
