= 621 =

Calendar year

621 in various calendars
- Gregorian calendar: 621; DCXXI
- Ab urbe condita: 1374
- Armenian calendar: 70; ԹՎ Հ
- Assyrian calendar: 5371
- Balinese saka calendar: 542–543
- Bengali calendar: 27–28
- Berber calendar: 1571
- Buddhist calendar: 1165
- Burmese calendar: −17
- Byzantine calendar: 6129–6130
- Chinese calendar: 庚辰年 (Metal Dragon); 3318 or 3111 — to — 辛巳年 (Metal Snake); 3319 or 3112
- Coptic calendar: 337–338
- Discordian calendar: 1787
- Ethiopian calendar: 613–614
- Hebrew calendar: 4381–4382
- Hindu calendars
- Vikram Samvat: 677–678
- Shaka Samvat: 542–543
- Kali Yuga: 3721–3722
- Holocene calendar: 10621
- Iranian calendar: 1 BP – 0 BP
- Islamic calendar: 1 BH – 0 BH
- Japanese calendar: N/A
- Javanese calendar: 511–512
- Julian calendar: 621; DCXXI
- Korean calendar: 2954
- Minguo calendar: 1291 before ROC 民前1291年
- Nanakshahi calendar: −847
- Seleucid era: 932/933 AG
- Thai solar calendar: 1163–1164
- Tibetan calendar: ལྕགས་ཕོ་འབྲུག་ལོ་ (male Iron-Dragon); 747 or 366 or −406 — to — ལྕགས་མོ་སྦྲུལ་ལོ་ (female Iron-Snake); 748 or 367 or −405

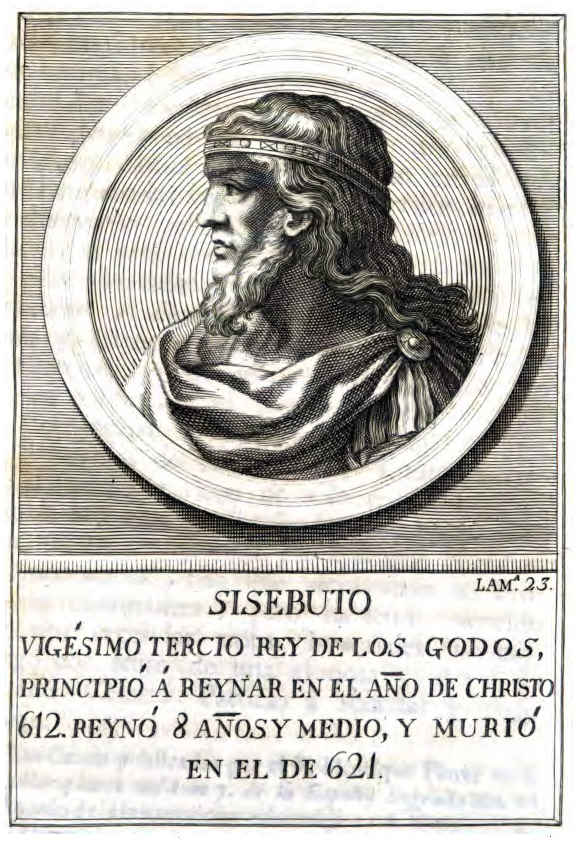
King Sisebut of the Visigoths (ca. 565–621)

Year 621 (DCXXI) was a common year starting on Thursday of the Julian calendar. The denomination 621 for this year has been used since the early medieval period, when the Anno Domini calendar era became the prevalent method in Europe for naming years.

== Events ==
=== By place ===
==== Byzantine Empire ====
- Emperor Heraclius concludes a peace agreement (in exchange for an annual tribute) with the Avars on the Balkan Peninsula, giving him a free hand to assemble Byzantine forces in Asia Minor, for non-military expenditure against the Persian Empire.
- The city of Málaga, in southern Spain in the province of Spania, is conquered by the Visigoths.

==== Europe ====
- King Sisebut dies after a 9-year reign and is succeeded by his son Reccared II (just a child). Reccared is placed on the throne by the Visigothic nobility, but dies after two months. Suintila, his half-uncle and regent, becomes king of the Visigothic Kingdom.

==== Asia ====
- Emperor Gaozu delegates control of his military and civil administration in the east to his second son, Li Shimin. He concentrates on reforming coinage (→ Kaiyuan Tongbao) and taxation.
- May 28 – Battle of Hulao: Li Shimin defeats the numerically superior army of Dou Jiande near the Hulao Pass.
- June 4 – Wang Shichong, self-declared emperor, surrenders to Li Shimin at Luoyang following Dou Jiande's defeat. Gaozu spares his life, but he is later assassinated.

=== By topic ===
==== Religion ====
- Islamic tradition says Muhammad visited heaven aboard the winged mount Buraq, in the Isra wal-Miraj, (the Night Journey), from Mecca to Jerusalem, then to heaven from Jerusalem's Temple Mount, then back to Mecca.

==== Technology ====
- The Chinese establish an imperial bureau for the manufacture of porcelain. Their technology will advance further under the Tang dynasty (approximate date).

== Births ==
- Ardashir III, king of the Persian Empire (d. 629)
- Gertrude of Nivelles, Frankish abbess (d. 659)
- Suraqah al-Bariqi, Arab poet (d. 698)

== Deaths ==
- November 15 – Malo, Welsh bishop
- Dou Jiande, general of the Sui dynasty (b. 573)
- Dou Kang, general of the Sui dynasty
- Reccared II, king of the Visigoths
- Sisebut, king of the Visigoths
- Wang Shichong, general of the Sui dynasty
- Xiao Xian, prince of the Liang dynasty (b. 583)
- Zhu Can, rebel leader during the Sui dynasty
