= Kashikodokoro Riding Car =

Japanese railroad car

Kashikodokoro
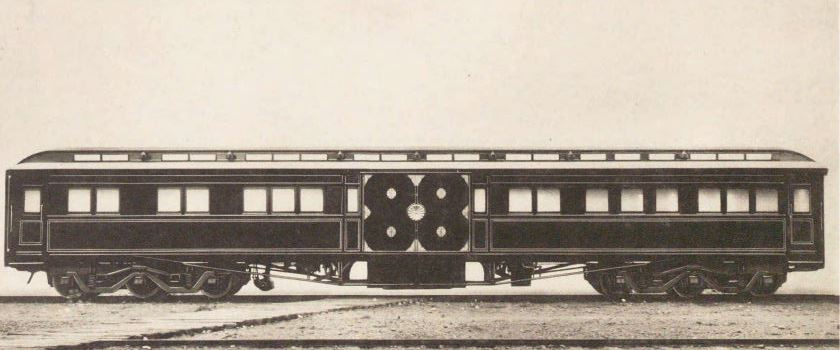
- Manufacturer: Japanese Ministry of Railways Oi works

Specifications
- Car body construction: Wood
- Train length: 19,991 mm (65 ft 7.0 in)
- Car length: 19,748 mm (64 ft 9.5 in)
- Width: 2,590 mm (8 ft 6 in)
- Height: 3,778 mm (12 ft 4.7 in)
- Weight: 31.49 t (30.99 long tons; 34.71 short tons)
- Bogies: Three axles
- Braking system: Vacuum brake
- Track gauge: 1,067 mm (3 ft 6 in)

The Kashikodokoro Riding Car (賢所乗御車, かしこどころじょうぎょしゃ) is a passenger car manufactured by the Japanese Ministry of Railways for the transportation of the sacred mirror, Yata no Kagami in 1915.

== Background ==
The sacred mirror, Yata no Kagami is one of the Three Sacred Treasures in Japan. During the Enthronement of the Japanese emperor, the emperor must perform several ceremonies in front of this mirror.

When the Meiji Emperor ascended to the throne and lived in Kyoto, there was no need to transport the sacred mirror over long distances. When the Emperor moved from Kyoto to Tokyo, there was still no railroad connecting Kyoto and Tokyo, so the sacred mirror was carried by hand along with other sacred objects. Later, when Emperor Meiji died on July 30, 1912, the accession ceremony of Emperor Taisho, who succeeded to the throne, was to take place at the Kyoto Imperial Palace on November 10, 1915. This was because the Imperial Household Law of that time stipulated that the accession ceremony be held in Kyoto. This necessitated the temporary transfer of the sacred mirror needed for the ceremony to Kyoto. For this reason, a railroad car was built to carry the sacred mirror, along with car for the emperor and empress and a dining car.

There were three types of Imperial Regalia of Japan: mirror, sword, and jewel. The sword and jewel were loaded on the car for the emperor, but the mirror was considered a separate object in which the god resided, so a special car was needed.

== Car overview ==
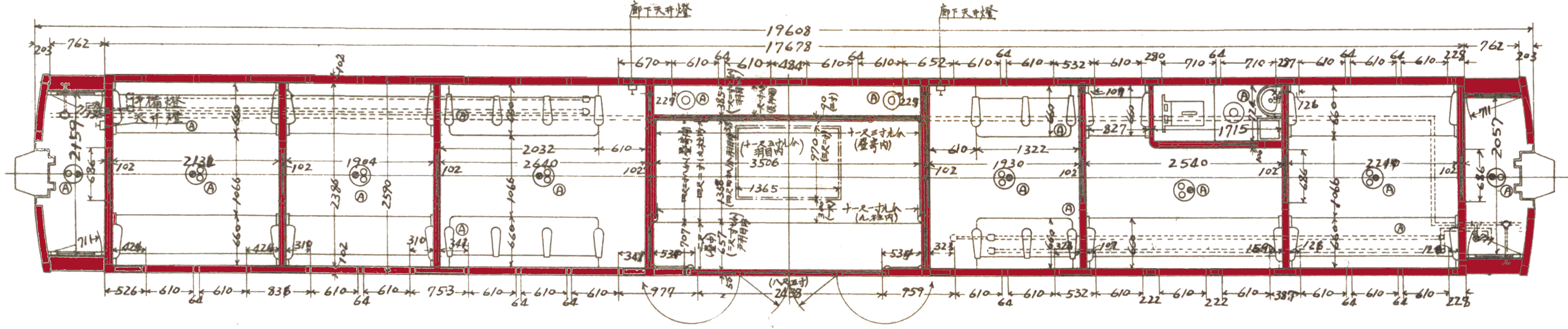
Top view drawing. Left is the front side.

=== Interior ===
On Japanese railroads, the entrance to the station platform is located on the left side of the train. The attendant and mirror also board this car from the left side.

The car is divided into seven rooms. A mirror is placed in the center (4th) room, and attendants ride in the three rooms in front of and behind the mirror room. At the back of the mirror room (on the opposite side of the entrance), there is a 385 mm wide passageway separated by a wall, allowing the attendant to go between the third and fifth rooms without passing through the mirror room.

Rooms 1 and 2 have fixed long benches on both sides. Room 3 also has long benches, but with folding armrests, each can be separated into three seats. The surface materials of the attendant's room are oak and sawtooth oak. The ceiling panels are maple, and the window frames are teak.

The fourth room is the room for the sacred mirror. The mirror room has 2,438 mm wide folding doors. The mirrors are put in and out through these doors. After the doors are closed, parts of the chrysanthemum flower, the imperial emblem, are attached to the joints. The mirror room has a coffered ceiling. The interior is Shinden-zukuri, and most of the material is just hinoki without paint. The metal parts are gold plated.

Room 5 has a total of four seats, two on each side.

Room 6 has a small room with a toilet and handwash stand in one corner. This toilet bowl is painted in black lacquer. The outside of the handwash bowl is painted with black lacquer and the inside with vermilion lacquer. It is equipped with a white wooden ladle.

Room 7 has almost the same structure as rooms 1 and 2.

=== Estimate the mirror weight ===
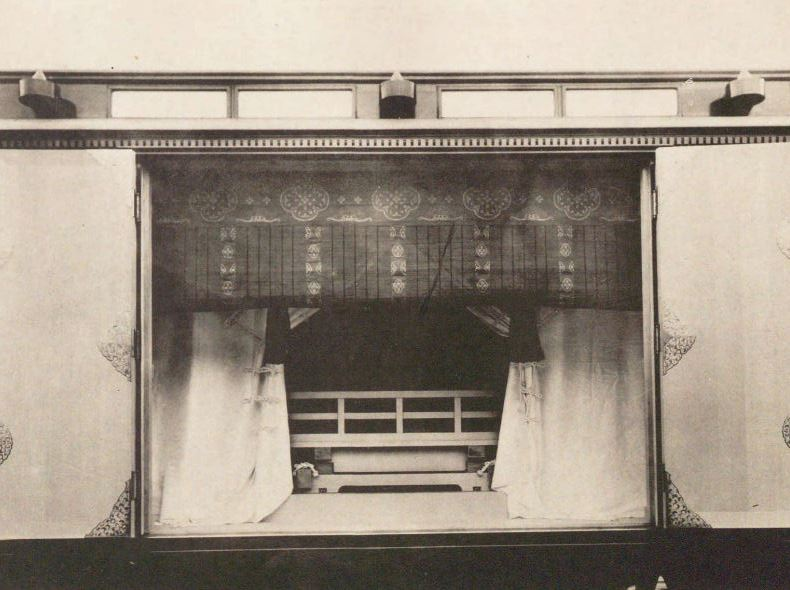
Room for the sacred mirror

The biggest concern for the Railway Institute's designers in building this car was the dimensions and weight of the sacred mirror.

The sacred mirror is believed to be an incarnation of the sun goddess Amaterasu, and even the Crown Prince was not allowed to stand before it. Even if it was necessary for car design, the public was not allowed to see or touch it. When asked for permission to measure, the Ministry of the Imperial Household initially refused. Later, only dimensional measurements were permitted, but weight measurements, which required lifting the sacred mirror and placing it on a scale, were not permitted.

The engineers therefore decided to extrapolate from previous literature. In 1868, this mirror was carried by people by hand from Kyoto to Tokyo. According to the records, sixteen young men carried the litter with the sacred mirror eastward on the Tōkaidō road, all of them sweating from the weight of the litter. The weight of the sacred mirror was estimated based on this description. They then designed the installation stand and transport equipment based on a fairly high estimate.

=== Bringing in the sacred mirror ===
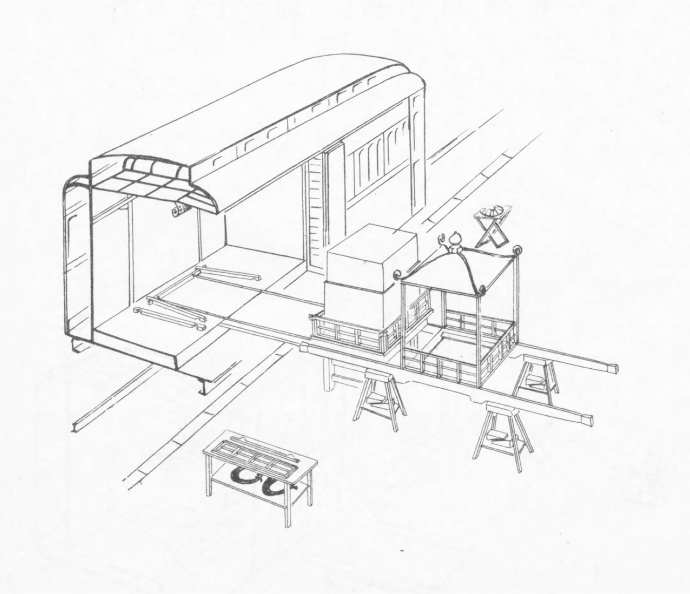
Transfer from litter to car (sectional drawing).

At the time of Emperor Showa's accession to the throne, a manual for transferring the mirror was prepared and careful practice was conducted.

- Tokyo Station: 4 times in May, September, October, and November 1928.
- Nagoya Station: October 11, 12, 13, 15, 16, 18, 22, 26, November 5, 24. (13th and 18th are for trial run)
- Oy Manufacturing Plant: 2 times each by Tokyo, Nagoya, and Osaka station staff upon completion of train refurbishment in October.
- Trial runs between Tokyo and Kyoto: October 13–19 and 22–28.

=== Other ===
The braking device is a vacuum brake.

== Operation ==
After its manufacture, it was used for the coronation ceremony of Emperor Taisho in 1915, carrying the sacred mirror from Tokyo to Kyoto and back; it was also used for the coronation ceremony of Emperor Showa in 1928, with an updated interior and other improvements.

The decision was made to discontinue use of this car in October 1959. Therefore, this car carried the sacred mirror only four times, including the round trip on the occasion of the coronation ceremonies of the Taisho and Showa Emperors.

After it was taken out of service, it was stored in the Asakawa depot.

== Later history ==
In June 1963, since the Asakawa depot was scheduled to be closed, the car was moved to the Imperial depot at Oi works.

According to the Japanese railway magazine Tetsudō Jānaru (Railway Journal), published in February 1982, the interior of the car was filled with the scent of cypress upon entry. Around the same time, while the other imperial cars had automatic air brakes fitted, the Kashikodokoro car had retained its vacuum brakes.

In 2019, the law had changed so that the enthronement of the Japanese emperor took place in Tokyo instead of Kyoto. The equipment for installing the sacred mirror during the accession ceremony, which had been permanently located in Kyoto, was transported to Tokyo. This eliminated the need to transport the sacred mirror by rail.

In 2023, the stored cars were moved before the demolition of the Imperial Depot began, but the new storage location has not been disclosed for security reasons.

== See also ==
- Royal train
