= Shinkyo =

Shinkyo may refer to:

- Changchun, formerly named Shinkyō (新京), the capital of the former Imperial Japanese puppet state of Manchukuo, China
- Japanese new religions, or shinshūkyō (新宗教), Japanese new religious movements
- Shinkyō (神鏡), a sacred mirror in Shinto
- Shinkyō (神橋), the Sacred Bridge at Futarasan shrine in Nikkō, Japan
