= Enthronement of the Japanese emperor =

Ceremony of the Imperial House of Japan

Enthronement of the Japanese emperor 即位の礼
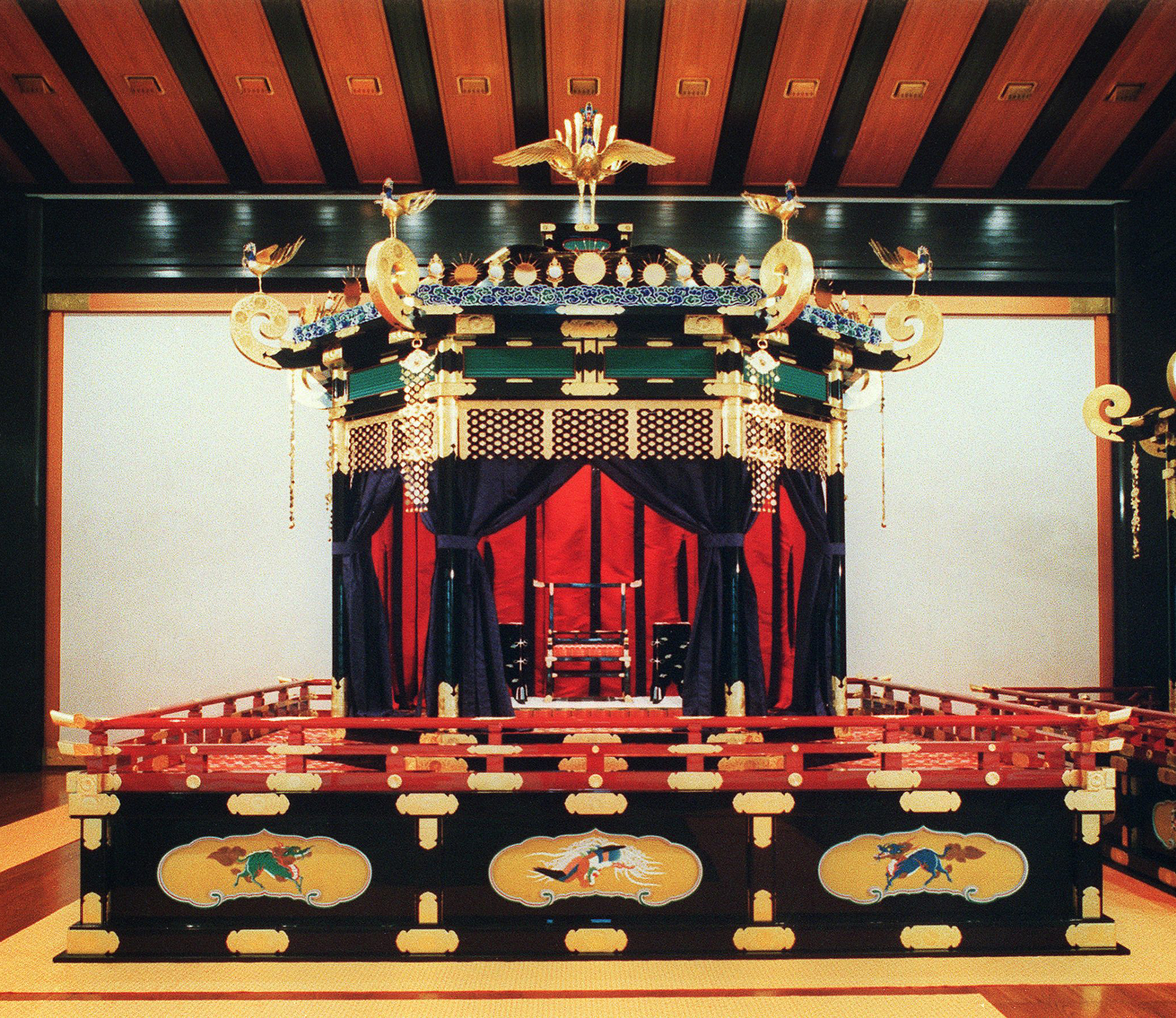
- Takamikura used for the enthronement
- Locations: Tokyo Imperial Palace, Matsu-no-Ma Hall
- Country: Japan
- Inaugurated: Empress Suiko (first); Emperor Kanmu (modern version)
- Previous event: 22 October 2019; Naruhito
- Participants: Emperor and Empress; Imperial Family adult members; Heads of the three branches of government; Prime Minister; Speaker of the House of Representatives; President of the House of Councillors; Chief Justice of the Supreme Court; Foreign heads of state; Domestic invitees
- Website: The Imperial Household Agency Cabinet Public Relations Office, Cabinet Secretariat

The Enthronement ceremony (即位の礼, Sokui no rei) is an ancient ceremony that marks the accession of a new emperor to the Chrysanthemum Throne. The Three Sacred treasures are given to the new sovereign during the course of the rite. It is the most important out of the Japanese Imperial Rituals. The most recent enthronement was that of Emperor Naruhito on 22 October 2019.

== Enthronement ceremonies ==
The enthronement ceremony consist of five sub-ceremonies, which are conducted as constitutional functions (国事行為) based on Article 3 of the Constitution of Japan as follows:

=== Presentation of the Three Sacred Treasures ===
The presentation of the Three Sacred Treasures (剣璽等承継の儀, Kenji-tō-Shōkei-no-gi) takes place immediately after the death or abdication of the previous sovereign. The successor is formally presented with boxes containing two of the three items that compose the Imperial Regalia of Japan:

- A replica sword representing the sword Kusanagi no Tsurugi (草薙の剣; lit. "Grasscutter Sword"), with the original allegedly enshrined and kept at Atsuta Shrine in Nagoya;
- The Yasakani no Magatama (八尺瓊曲玉), a necklace of comma-shaped stone beads;
- The mirror Yata no Kagami (八咫鏡), which is enshrined in the Ise Grand Shrine as the go-shintai (御神体), or the embodiment of the Sun goddess herself. It is the most significant item out of the imperial regalia and is permanently housed in the shrine, and is not presented to the emperor for the enthronement ceremony. Imperial messengers and priests are sent to this shrine, as well as to the tomb-shrines of the four emperors whose reigns immediately preceded the new monarch, to inform them of the new emperor's accession.

The three items of the imperial regalia were originally said to have been given by the Sun goddess, Amaterasu, to her grandson when he first descended to earth and became the founder of the imperial dynasty. In his 14th-century Jinnō Shōtōki, the scholar Kitabatake Chikafusa, associated with the Ise Shintō tradition, assigned each of the three treasures a corresponding virtue: the sword Kusanagi represents valor, the jewel Magatama represents wisdom, and the mirror Yata no Kagami represents benevolence, an interpretation that proved highly influential for the broader medieval theory of Japan's divine origin (shinkoku).

=== The first audience after the enthronement ===
The second is called Sokui-go-Choken-no-gi (即位後朝見の儀). The new emperor will meet leaders of the tripartite political system as the representatives of citizens for the first time.

=== Proclaiming enthronement at the main palace ===
Banzai banner used for the enthronement ceremony.

The third part of the ceremony, called Sokuirei-Seiden-no-gi (即位礼正殿の儀), is the ritual to proclaim and congratulate the enthronement.

This ancient rite was traditionally held in Kyoto, the former capital of Japan. Following the promulgation of the postwar constitution, it has been done in Tokyo. Only part of the ritual is public, and the regalia itself is generally seen only by the emperor and a few Shinto priests. First comes a three-hour ceremony in which the new emperor ritually informs his ancestors that the enthronement is about to take place. This is then followed by the enthronement itself. The throne is an enclosure called the Takamikura, containing a great square pedestal upholding three octagonal pedestals and a simple chair. This is surrounded by an octagonal pavilion with curtains, surmounted by a great golden phoenix. At the same time, the empress, in full dress regalia, moves to a smaller adjacent throne beside her husband's. Traditional drums are beaten to start the proceedings.

The emperor then proceeds to his chair. The Kusanagi no Tsurugi, Yasakani no Magatama, privy seal and state seal are placed on stands next to the emperor. A simple wooden sceptre is presented to the emperor, who faces the prime minister standing in an adjacent courtyard, representing the Japanese people. The emperor makes a speech followed by one from the prime minister. This is followed by three cheers of banzai from all of those present.

This moment of the rite ends with the firing of a 21-gun salute by the Japan Self-Defense Forces. After this, both seals and the two regalia items are carried off the imperial pavilion.

=== Celebratory parade ===
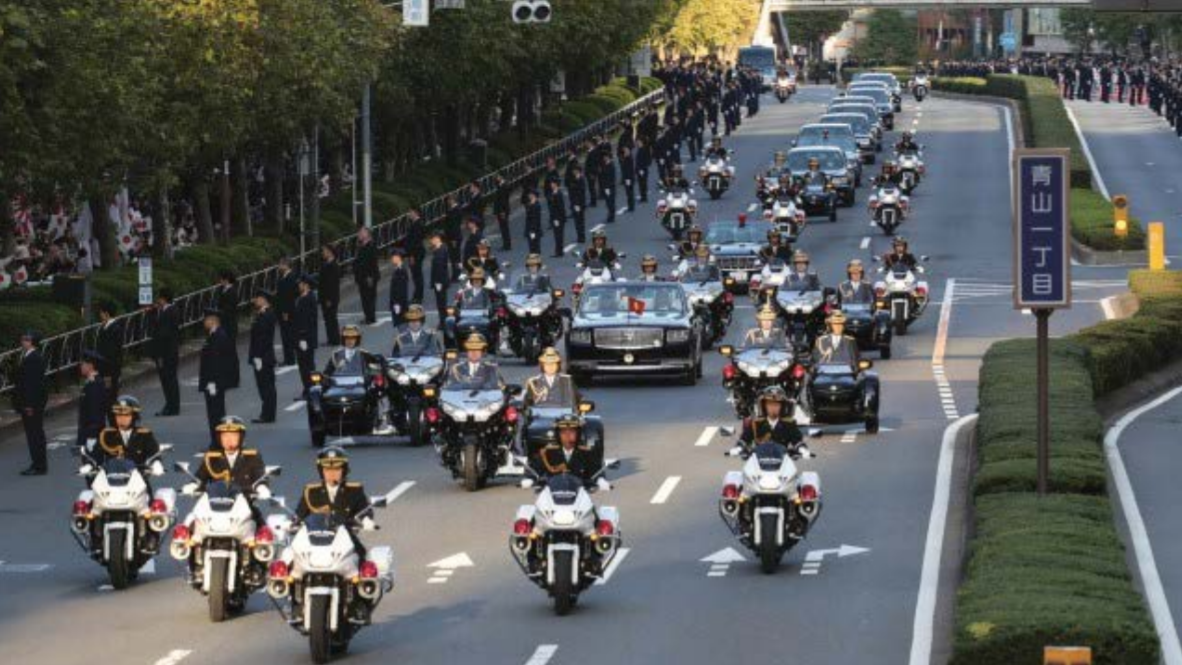
Celebration parade at Aoyama, Tokyo, 2019

The fourth, called Shukuga-Onretsu-no-gi (祝賀御列の儀), is the motorcade procession. The emperor and empress, are both driven through Tokyo towards the Akasaka Estate by the state limousine (御料車) to acknowledge the cheers of the citizens on the major streets of the capital who have assembled there. As head of state, the emperor also receives the first salutes on that segment by a guard of honour of the Japan Self-Defense Force and the Imperial Guard Headquarters of the National Police Agency (皇宮警察本部).

In this ceremony, the Imperial Household Agency and constables of the Imperial Guard Headquarters provide guards of honor and security while the Tokyo Metropolitan Police Department's Police band and Japan Ground Self-Defense Force Music Corps play suitable music.

=== Court and prime ministerial banquets ===
The fifth is the official banquet, called Kyouen-no-gi (饗宴の儀), which is the occasion to announce and celebrate the enthronement, and to receive the felicitations of the guests invited for the event, which is held currently within Tokyo Imperial Palace.

An additional banquet is hosted by the prime minister and their spouse in Tokyo to thank foreign heads of state and dignitaries for attending the enthronement, and to foster a greater understanding of Japan by presenting displays of traditional Japanese culture. This banquet is an event out of the scope of constitutional functions (国事行為).

== History of the enthronement ceremony ==
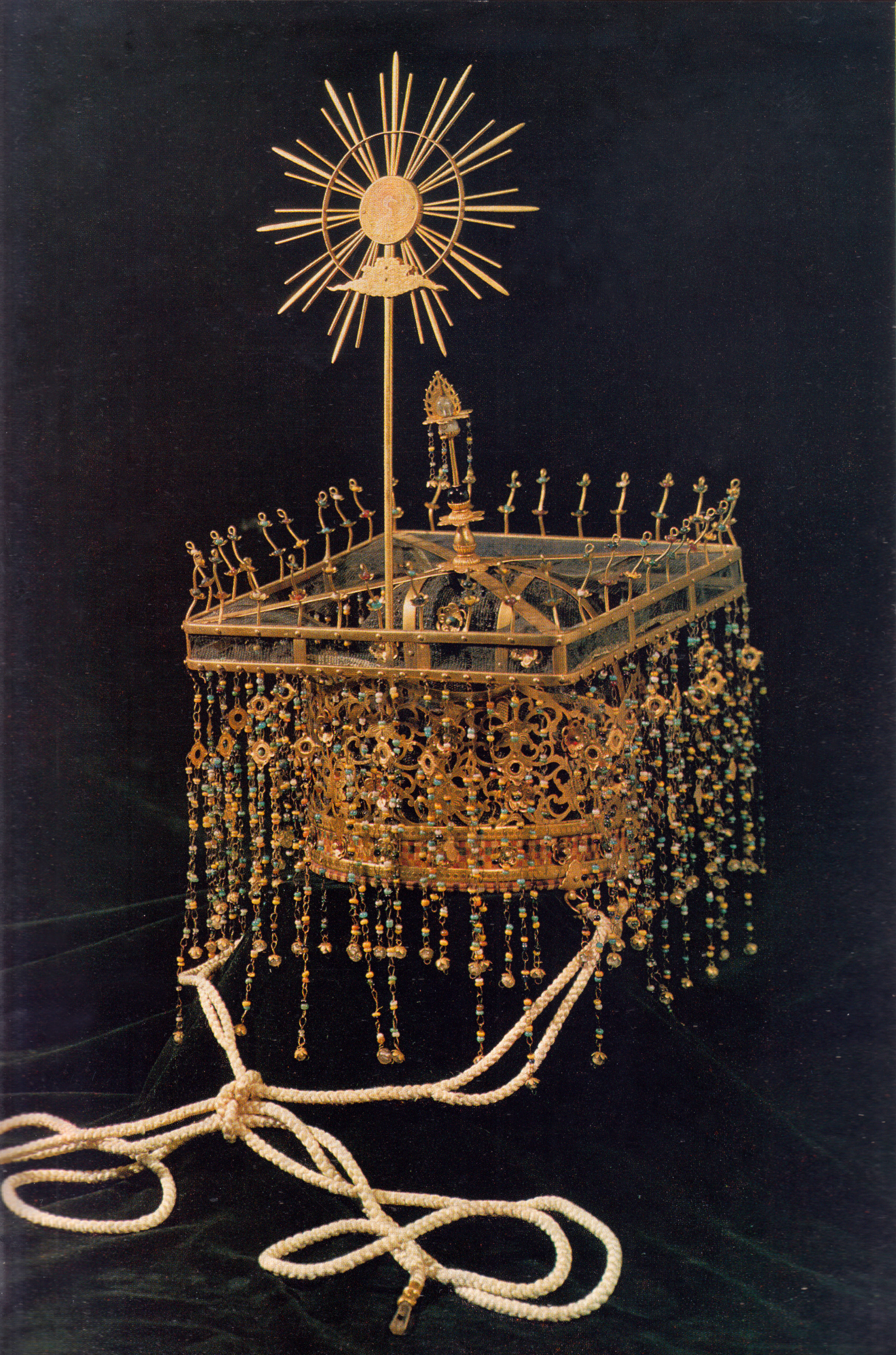
The crown of Emperor Komei. He was crowned only for the coronation.

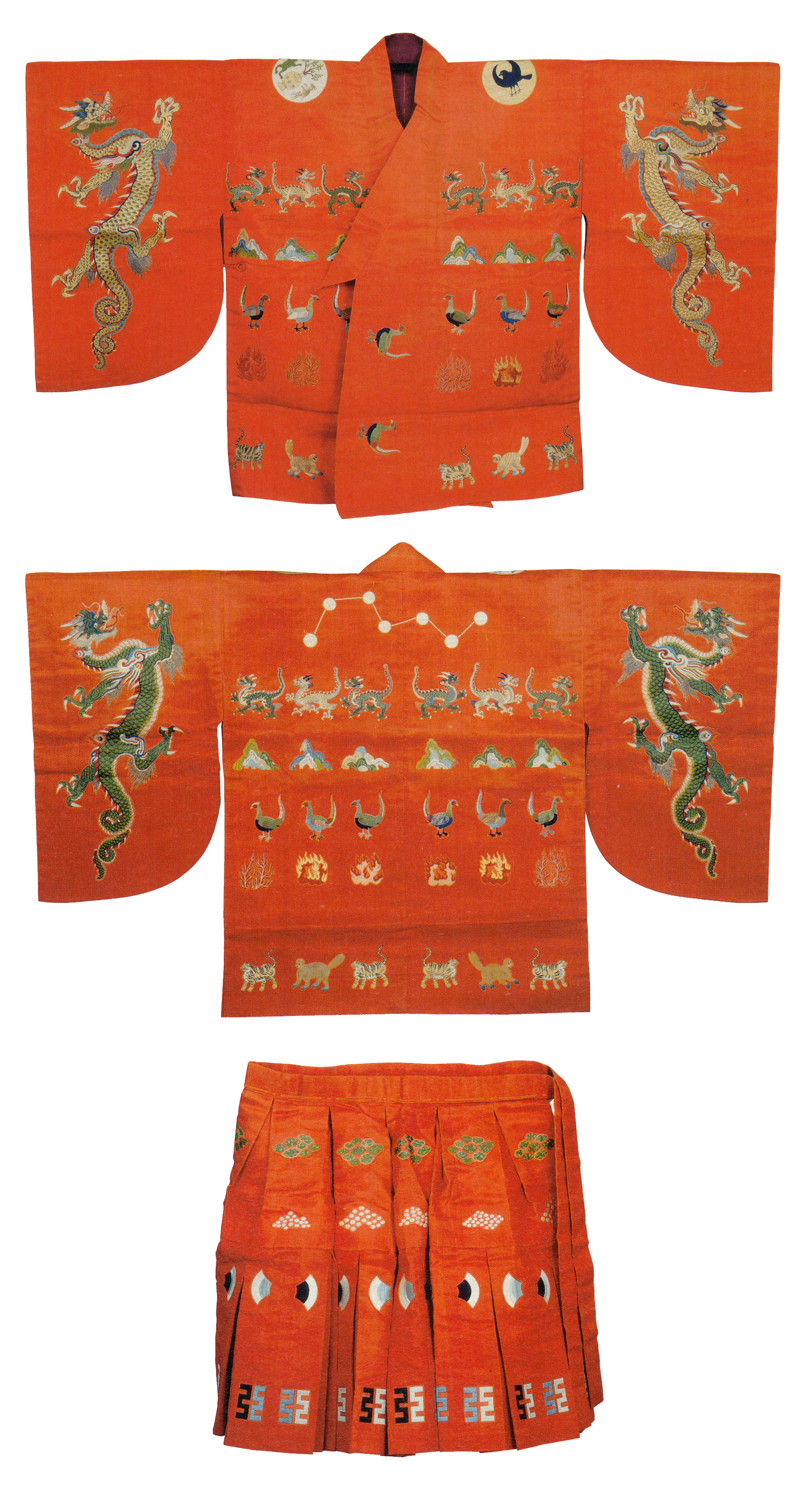
Emperor Komei's'sKon'e coronation dress. It was used by emperor in pre-Meiji period.

As far as the records in the Kiki are concerned, the enthronement ceremony was held on the first day of the year. It is believed that when Sexagenary calendar cycle system was imported from the Sui dynasty during the reign of Empress Suiko, the accession to the throne on the first day of the year was adopted, following the example of the continental emperors.

The enthronement ceremony was integrated with the Daijō-sai, a ceremony introduced under the reign of Empress Kōgyoku. During this, the new emperor welcomes Amaterasu for the first time, centering on the offering of sacred food and a communal meal ritual.

Although the details of the ceremony are not clear even in the Chronicles, the Divine Instruments were first given and received, and the ceremony of ascending to the "platform" was held on the same day or later.

The first time the rituals were recorded in detail was on New Year's, during the fourth year of Shuchō (February 14, 690). It is the enthronement ceremony of Empress Jitō. (Note: In this example, the emperor had been shosei (acting in state affairs) for more than three years before succeeding to the throne, and on this day he formally succeeded to the throne.) At this time, the ceremony was as follows

- Isonokami Maro establishes the Big Shield.
- Nakatomi Oshima, Count of Shingi recites the Tenjin Jyushi.
- Imaizumi Irochi consecrates the sacred Kusanagi no Tsurugi and Yata no Kagami.
- The one hundred lords and ladies of the court assemble and perform an eightfold kashiwate.

At this point, the Tenjin Jyushi had been recited twice, along with the Dai-namesai. In the Yōrō Code (720), it is also stated that "on the day of senso, the sermon of Tenjin is performed and the mirror and sword of the Imbibe's divine regalia are raised." It is clear that the transfer of sacred artifacts took place after the jubilee.

However, at the time of the succession to the throne of Emperor Kanmu, the enthronement was followed by the Imperial Rescript at Daikoku-den (大黒殿) which effectively separated the Sensō from the enthronement. In 930, the Sensō and Enthronement were effectively separated with the enthronement of Emperor Suzaku.

In the 870s, the Teikan Ritual and the 11th century Eke Yosei, the accession ceremony was clearly defined as follows.

- The Emperor faces south with a ladle in his high seat.
- The Emperor faces the south on his high throne, holding a ladle.
- Kashiwate, dancing, and congratulating the Emperor and his hundred officials, and three cheers given by the military officials.

Here, the Yōrō Code's provisions for the transfer of the Sword and Seal and the Tenjin jubilee were removed, and the ceremony took on a more continental style, with the emperor facing south and wearing ceremonial dress.

However, by the middle of the Heian period, this form had already broken down, and the pseudo-attendants in the palace were joined by the uchi-ben (equivalent to a superior lord) and sotoben (a designated official who attended the ceremony in general). Only nominated persons stood. No one below the rank of a nobleman was allowed to attend. From the Middle Ages to the early modern period, it was common for the soto-ben to consist of two each of the daimon, chunagon, and councilors. In the Middle Ages and early modern times, the sotoben were usually two each from the daionnagon, chunnagon, and counselor. Only a limited number of nobles and officials, such as those in charge of ceremonies, participated in the coronation ceremony, and nobles who did not have that role, even ministers, watched from inside the draperies on either side of the high throne.

The enthronement ceremony of Emperor Go-Ichijō on February 7, 1016, was conducted by Dainagon, Fujiwara no Sanesuke, a major figure in the Royal court, who wrote in detail in his diary, "Shōyūki", that he was able to observe the enthronement ceremony as a spectator, not as a participant. In addition, from the late Heian period (after Emperor Horikawa) onward, the regent was in the middle or lower tier of the high palace, and the sekibaku in Sokutai in the east curtain of the north classic aisle, behind the high palace (to the right when viewed from the south). The regent of Emperor Go-Ichijō, Fujiwara no Michinaga, was also in this position, so it is highly likely that early regents were in this position as well.

As a rule, throughout the Heian period, the venue for ceremonies was the Daigoku-den Hall of the Chodo-in (the eight sects), but due to the burning of the Daigoku-den, Emperor Yōzei used the Fengakuden Hall. Due to illness, Emperor Reizei ascended the throne in the Shichinden Hall of the Interior, and due to the burning of the Daigoku-den, Emperor Go-Sanjō moved it also. Emperor Antoku used the Hall of the Capital in the Inner Palace. Since the Daigoku-den Hall fell into disuse after the Great Fire of Angen in 1176, all emperors from the Kamakura period to Emperor Go-Tsuchimikado of the mid Muromachi period, with the exception of Go-Murakami, Chōkei, and Go-Kameyama of the Southern Court, who were not in Kyoto. After Go-Kashiwabara, the Grand Council of State was not rebuilt, and the Hall of the Capital was used, where it remained until Emperor Meiji.

In the Middle Ages and later (the first example is said to be Emperor Go-Sanjō, but it is said to have become customary after Emperor Go-Fukakusa), a Buddhist-style ceremony called the Accession ceremony was also held. This style was continued until the late Edo period.

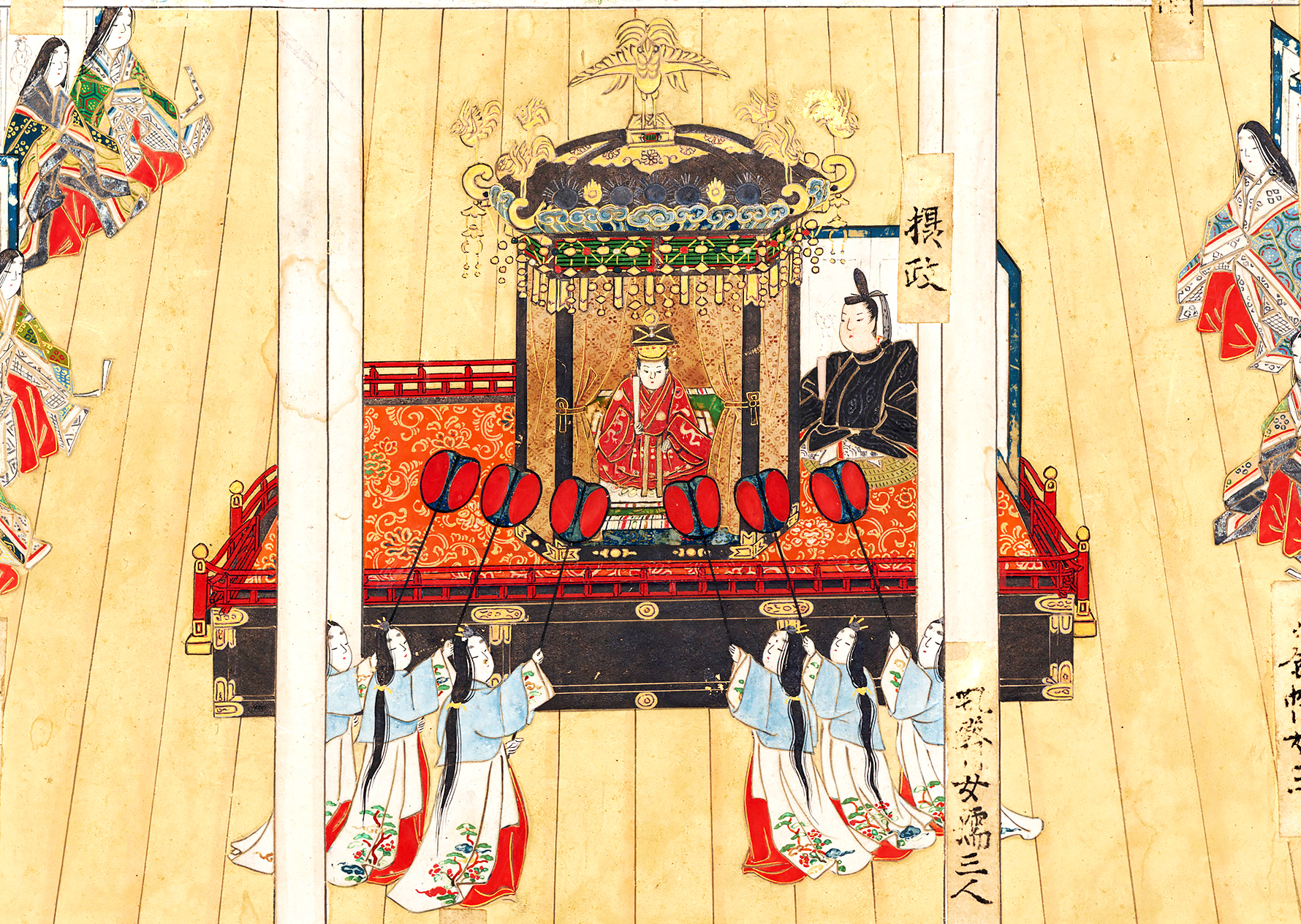
Enthronement of Emperor Reigen

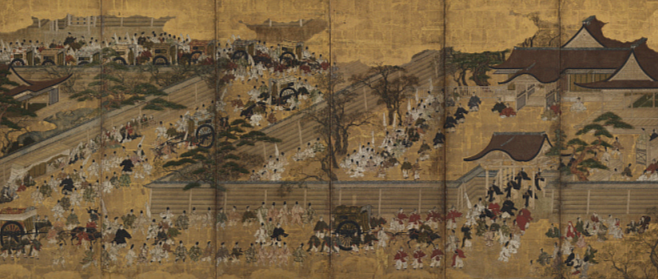
The enthronement of Empress Meishō

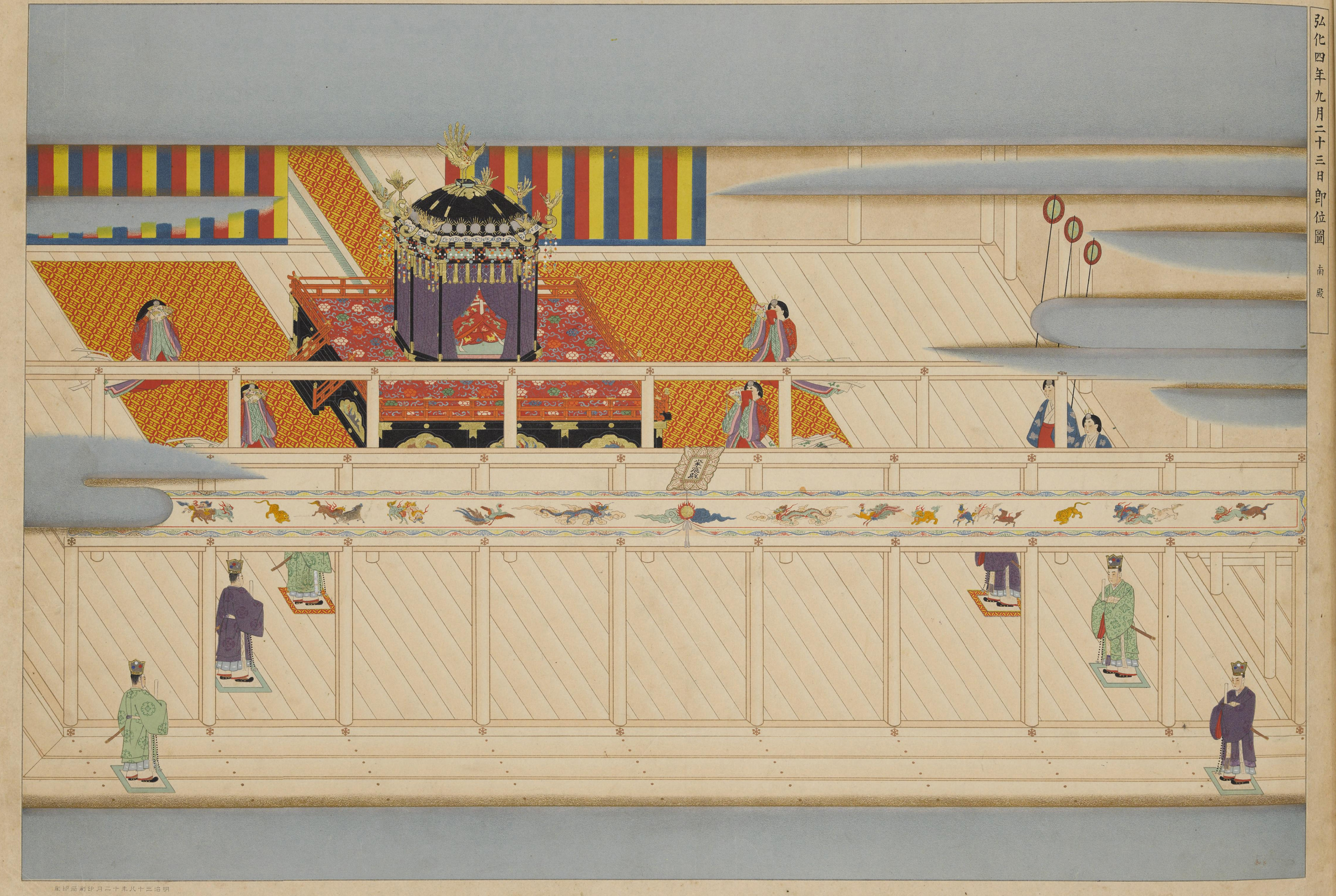
Emperor Kōmei.

Although the enthronement ceremony is one of the most important imperial events, the Emperor Go-Kashiwabara of the Sengoku period 1500, was unable to perform the ceremonies, but in 1521, he performed the enthronement ceremony in his 21st year on the throne, based on assistance from the Muromachi shogunate and others. The direct trigger for the ceremony was the shogunate's donation of 20,000 rolls of rice, but in reality, it was not possible to carry out the ceremony with that little money, as the shogunate had donated money several times since the Bunki era, and the Imperial Court had accumulated tools prepared with donations from Honganji and others. Emperor Go-Nara's accession to the throne was postponed for about ten years due to lack of funds, even though there were many items left over from the accession of Emperor Go-Kashiwabara. In the case of Emperor Ogimachi, the imperial treasury was unable to contribute to the cost of the coronation, and the ceremony was held with the assistance of Mōri Motonari. However, despite many difficulties, the ceremony has been performed without fail in every generation, except for Emperor Chūkyō, who only reigned for a short time due to the Jōkyū War.

After the Jokyu Rebellion, when Emperor Shijō ascended to the throne, spectators crowded into the garden, and even after this, there are articles in the court nobles' diaries that suggest that the rituals were hindered by spectators.

The accession ceremony of Empress Meishō was described as "filled with spectators of high rank and low rank in the garden," and it seems that a considerable number of spectators thronged to the throne.

In keeping with tradition, research has shown that during the Edo period, the general public was able to watch the accession ceremony at the Kyoto Imperial Palace by purchasing stamps (a kind of ticket). Captain Nomiya Sadaharu, who was not involved in the ceremonies at the time of the accession to the throne of Empress Go-Sakuramachi, who only attended the ceremony to see the empress off, was upset that many ordinary court nobles were not allowed to observe the ceremony because of the large number of "samurai slaves" and "miscellaneous people", but that the shogunate's envoys were allowed to see the ceremony unofficially in the Capital Hall.

After the Meiji Restoration, a series of ceremonies related to the senso and accession of the emperor were established by the enactment of the former Imperial Household Law and the Tengoku Order. In addition, there are a number of other rituals and ceremonies that can be performed in Kyoto. The current Imperial Household Law, enacted in 1947.

The ceremony began with an announcement of the due date to Amaterasu, and successive emperors, followed by a report to the Three Palaces in the Imperial Palace, and an imperial proclamation to the Ise Grand Shrine. In accordance with the Tengoku Order, the period from Spring to Autumn is designated as the time of accession, and for one year after the Collapse of the previous emperor, the accession ceremony and the Daijō-sai are not held as a period of mourning. This period of mourning is called "Ryoami" in Japanese.

=== Emperor Meiji's enthronement ===
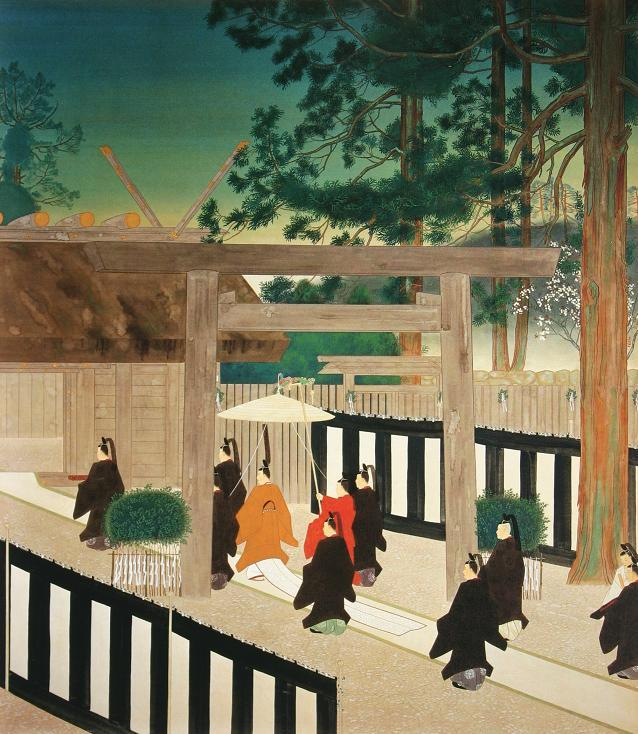
Emperor Meiji's audience at Ise Shrine

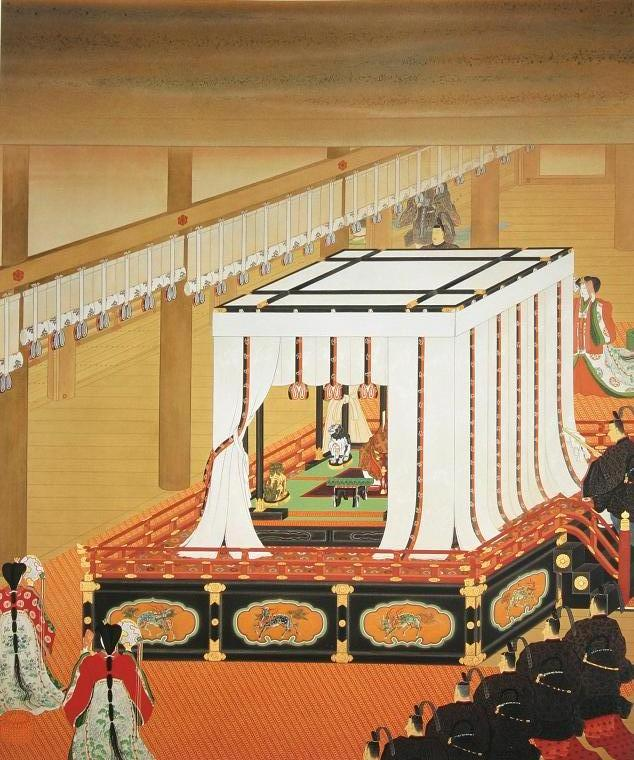
Coronation of emperor Meiji

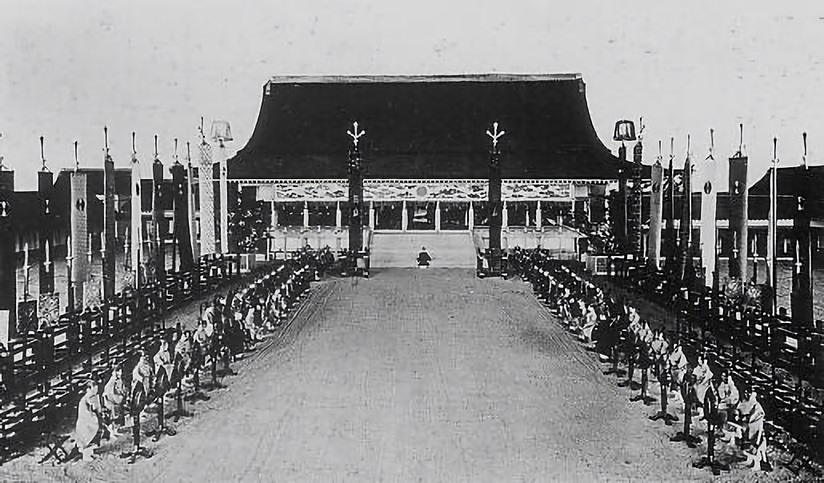
Emperor Taisho's coronation.

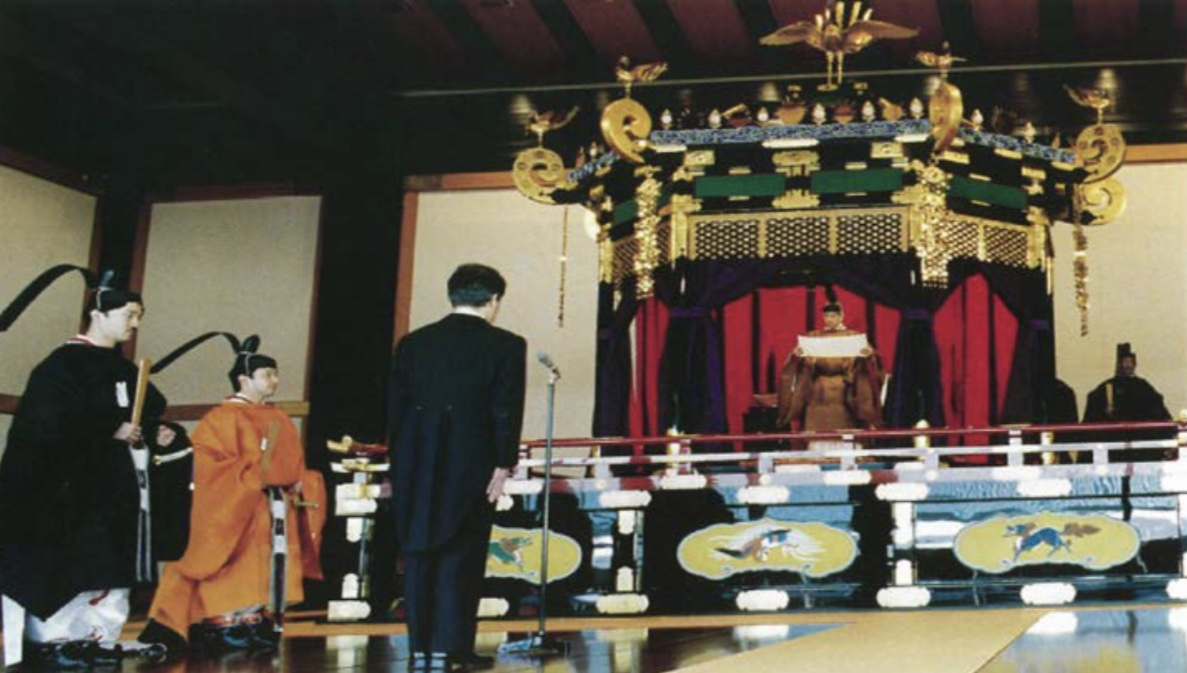
Emperor Akihito's enthronement.

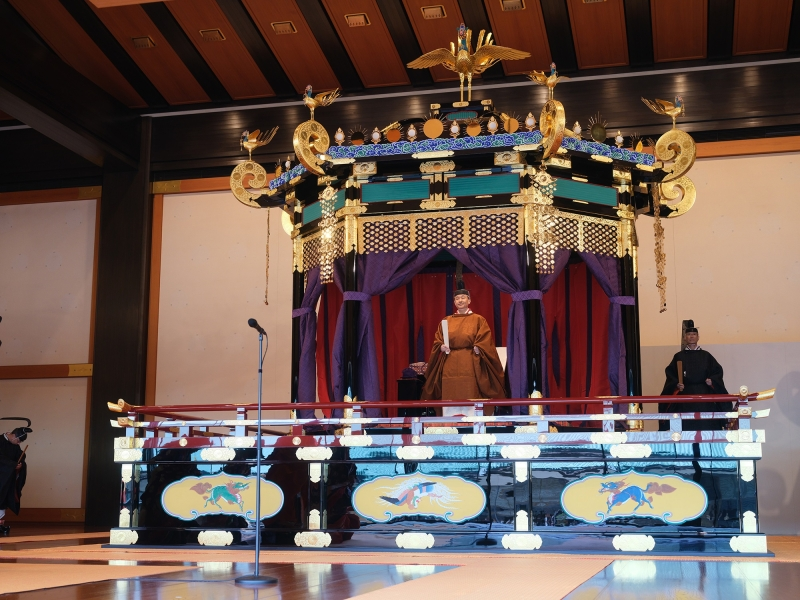
Emperor Naruhito's enthronement.

Since the Tempō calendar was in use at the time of the coronation of the 122nd and Meiji Emperor, and the dates differ from the current Gregorian calendar, they are listed in the order of the Tenpō calendar (Gregorian calendar).

On 13 February 1867 (lunar calendar: December 25, Keio 2), following the death of the 121st Emperor, Emperor Kōmei, his son, Crown Prince Mutsuhito succeeded to the throne, becoming the 122nd Emperor of Japan. Initially, the accession ceremony was scheduled to take place in November, but it was postponed due to the many difficulties in the country's affairs amidst the rapid changes in the times, including the return of power by Tokugawa Yoshinobu.

In May of the following year, 1868, in order to proclaim the arrival of a new era, the new Meiji government decided to hold a new coronation ceremony appropriate to the changes, and appointed the Tsuwano Domain lord and Department of The Tsuwano Domain and deputy governor of the Department of Divinities, Kamei Korekan, was appointed as the Imperial Accession Ceremony Coordinator. Iwakura Tomomi ordered Kamei to abolish the Tang-style rituals and restore the old style. As a symbol of the new era, the Globe was used in the ceremony to make the emperor's prestige known to the world. Since the costumes and decorations that were considered to be in the Tang style were completely abolished, the ceremonial dress was abolished and the sash, which had been the second formal dress after the ceremonial dress since the Heian period, was used. Flags of honor in the garden were also abolished and replaced by the sakaki flag.

On August 17, Keio 4 (gregorian calendar: 2 October 1868), he announced that his enthronement would take place ten days later, on 27 August (12 October 1868), and related ceremonies began on August 21. On the 27th, the next day after the imperial envoy was sent to Emperor Sutoku to read out the decree in front of his spirit on the 26th of the same month, the anniversary of his death, and on the day of the enthronement, the decree was read out by the decree envoy, the first person in attendance read out the Norito, and an ancient song was sung. Then they all chanted "Hai" and the ceremony ended.

- Meiji-no-dairei - total cost 43,800 ryō
  - Ritual of sending an imperial envoy to Ise Shrine, August 21, 1868 (October 6, 1868)
- August 21, 1868 (October 6, 1868): Imperial envoy dispatched to Emperor Jimmu's tomb, Emperor Tenchi's tomb, and the tomb of the previous three emperors.
- August 23 (October 8, the same year): Enthronement ceremony
- The Daijō-sai was held in Tokyo on November 17, 1871 (December 28, 1871).

=== Emperor Taishō's enthronement ===
Emperor Taishō was enthroned on 10 November 1915 at the Kyoto Imperial Palace. Empress Teimei was absent because she was pregnant with their fourth child (Takahito, Prince Mikasa).

=== Emperor Shōwa's enthronement ===
Emperor Shōwa was enthroned on 10 November 1928 at the Kyoto Imperial Palace.

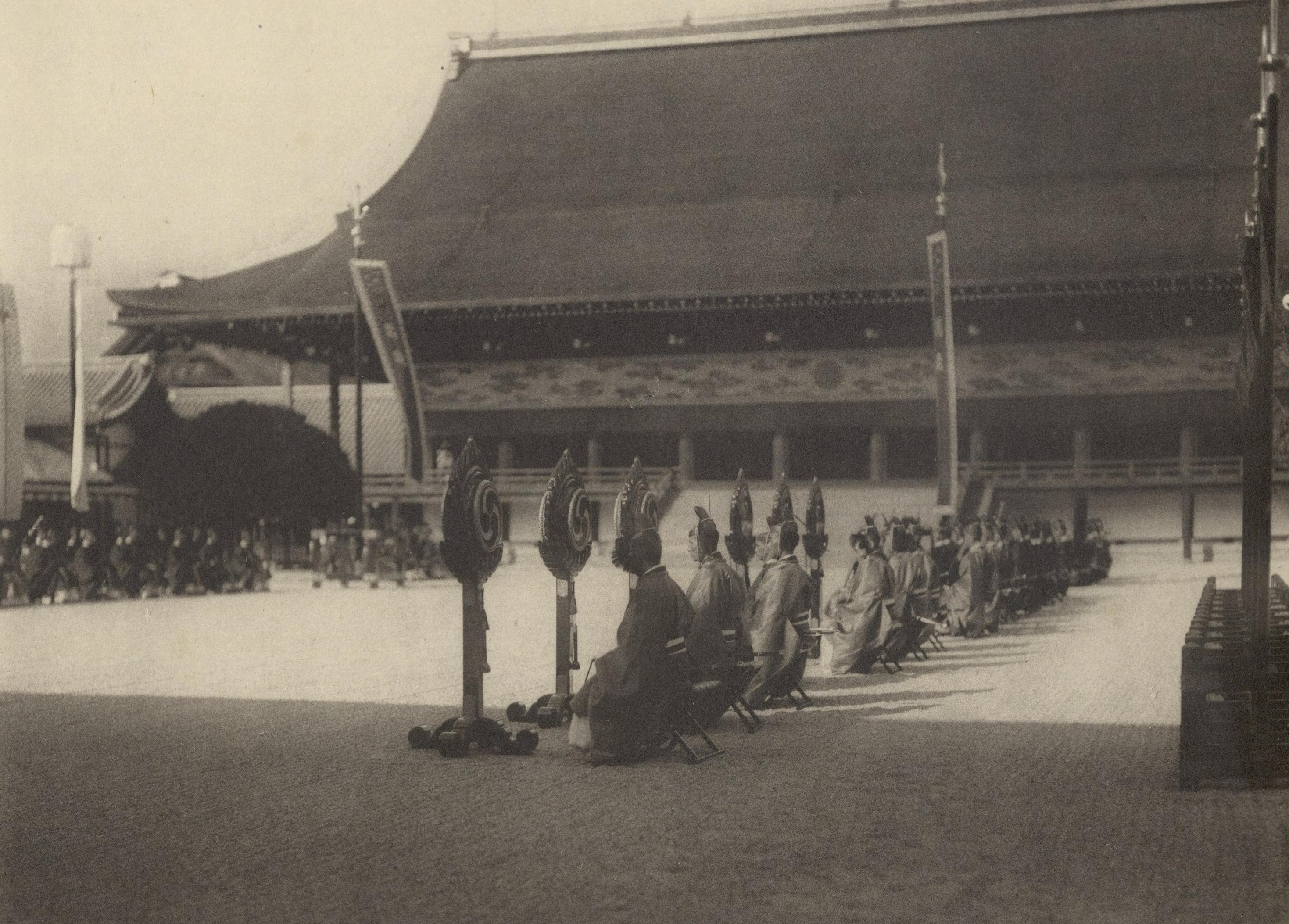
The enthronement ceremonyof Emperor Shōwa in Shishinden Hall

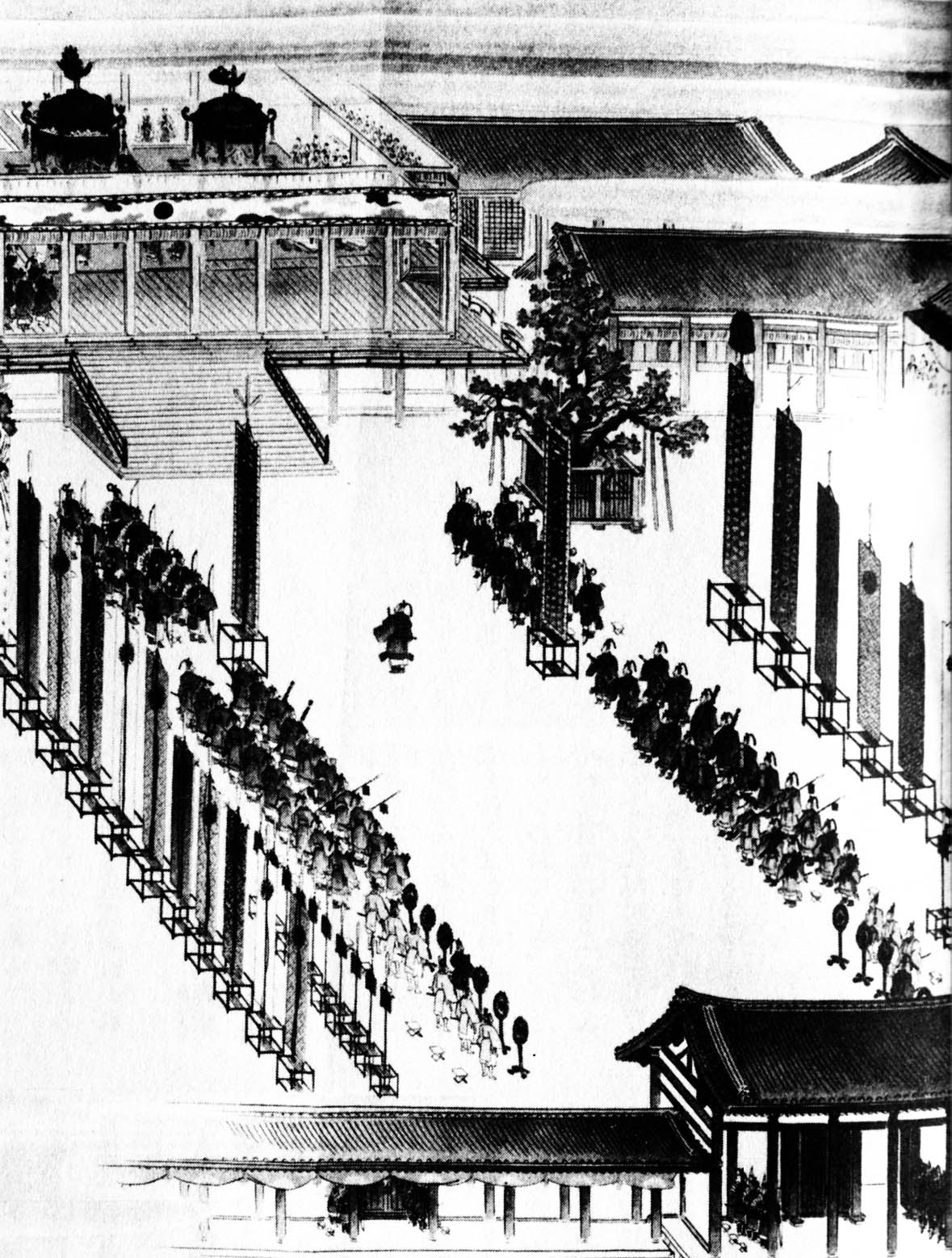
Emperor Showa's coronation.

=== Emperor Akihito's enthronement ===
Emperor Akihito was enthroned on 12 November 1990 at the Tokyo Imperial Palace.

=== Emperor Naruhito's enthronement ===
Emperor Naruhito was enthroned on 22 October 2019 at the Tokyo Imperial Palace. It was the first enthronement in the 21st century. His parade was postponed to 10 November 2019 due to Typhoon Hagibis.

== The Daijō-sai ==
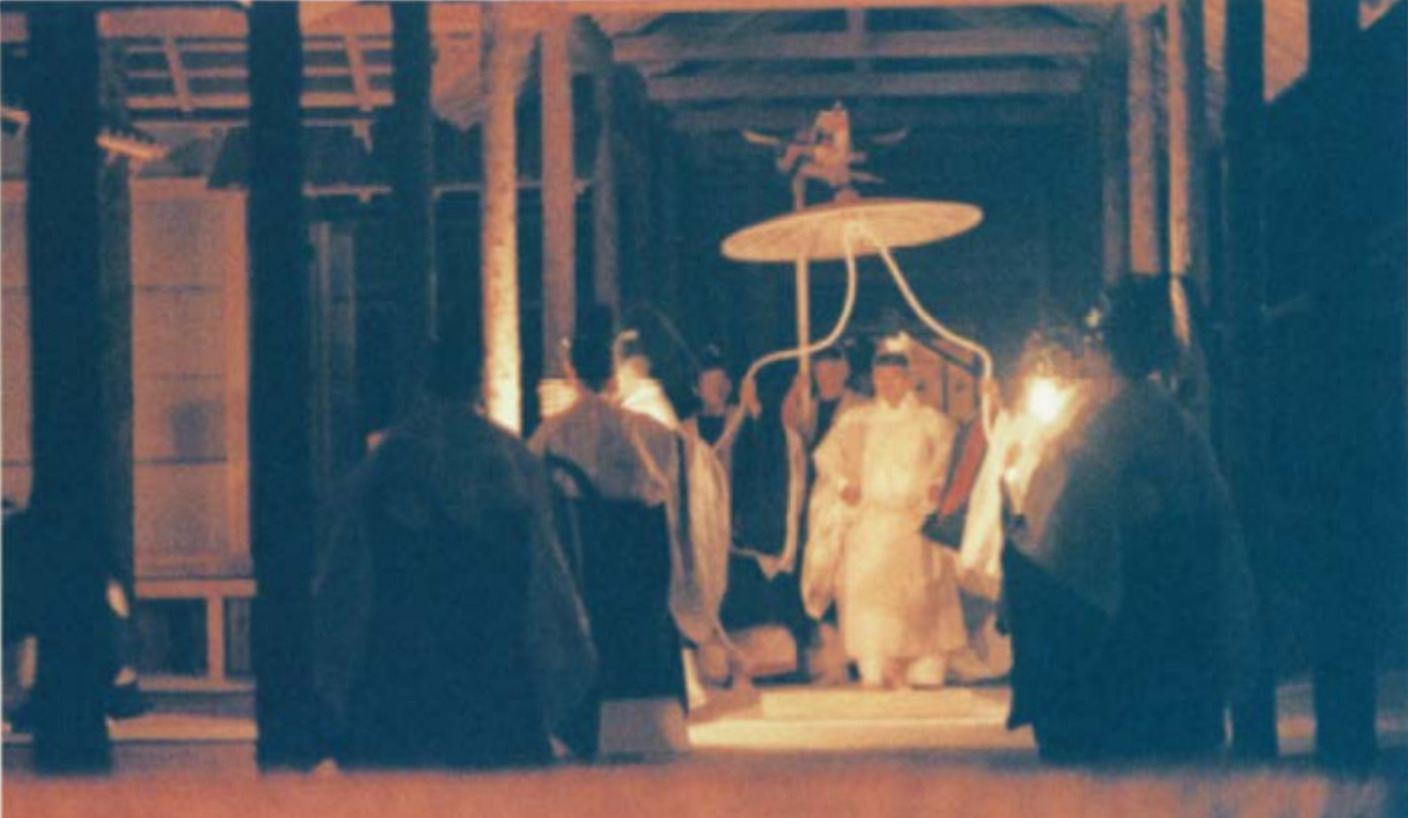
The Daijō-sai of Emperor Akihito in 1990

The Daijō-sai (大嘗祭) is a special religious service conducted in November after the enthronement, in which the emperor thanks peace of mind and rich harvest to the Solar deity Amaterasu (天照大神) and surrounding deities, and pray for Japan and its citizens.

From the Shinto viewpoint, the emperor is believed to be united to the deity Amaterasu in a unique way to share in her divinity.

In general, the Daijosai is considered as a kind of thanksgiving harvest festival, in the same way as Niiname-sai (新嘗祭) is conducted annually on November 23, a public holiday of Labor Thanksgiving Day. In the year the Daijō-sai is held, the Niiname-sai (新嘗祭) is not held.

The Emperor and Empress both perform the Daijosai ceremony in November after ascending the throne in a partly televised ceremony and since 2019 it is a livestreamed event. It is only performed once during their reign. Akihito performed it on 22-23 November 1990 and Naruhito on 14-15 November 2019. The Emperor offers gifts such as rice, kelp, millet and abalone to the gods.

Then he reads an appeal to the gods and eats the offering and prays. The Emperor and Empress perform the rites separately. It takes about 3 hours. Over 500 people are present including the Prime Minister, government officials, representatives of state and private sector firms, society groups and members of the press. It originates as a Shinto rite from at least the 7th century. It is held as a private event by the Imperial Household, and while many consider it to not violate the separation of church and state, there is still controversy as some say that it does. A special complex with over 30 structures (大嘗宮, daijōkyū) are built for the event. Afterward, they are accessible to the public for a few weeks and then dismantled. In 1990, the ritual cost more than 2.7 billion yen ($24.7 million).

=== Details ===
First, two special rice paddies (斎田, saiden) are chosen and purified by elaborate Shinto purification rites. The families of the farmers who are to cultivate the rice in these paddies must be in perfect health. Once the rice is grown and harvested, it is stored in a special Shinto shrine as its go-shintai (御神体), the embodiment of a kami or divine force. Each kernel must be whole and unbroken, and is individually polished before it is boiled. Some sake is also brewed from this rice. The two sets of rice seedlings now blessed each come from the western and eastern prefectures of Japan, and the chosen rice from these is assigned from a designated prefecture each in the west and east of the country, respectively.

Two thatched roof two-room huts (悠紀殿 yukiden, lit. East-region hall) and (主基殿 sukiden, lit. West-region hall) are built within a corresponding special enclosure, using a native Japanese building style. The Yukiden and Sukiden represent the east and west halves of Japan, respectively. Each hall is divided into two rooms, with one room containing a large couch made of tatami mats at its center, in addition to a seat for the emperor and a place to enshrine the kami; the second is used by musicians. All furniture and household items also preserve these earliest, and thus most purely Japanese forms: e.g., all pottery objects are fired but unglazed. These two structures represent the house of the preceding emperor and that of the new emperor. In earlier times, when the head of a household died his house was burned; before the founding of Kyoto, whenever an emperor died his entire capital city was burned as a rite of purification. As in the earlier ceremony, the two houses represent housing styles from western and eastern parts of Japan. Since 1990, the temporary enclosure is located at the eastern grounds of the Imperial Palace complex.

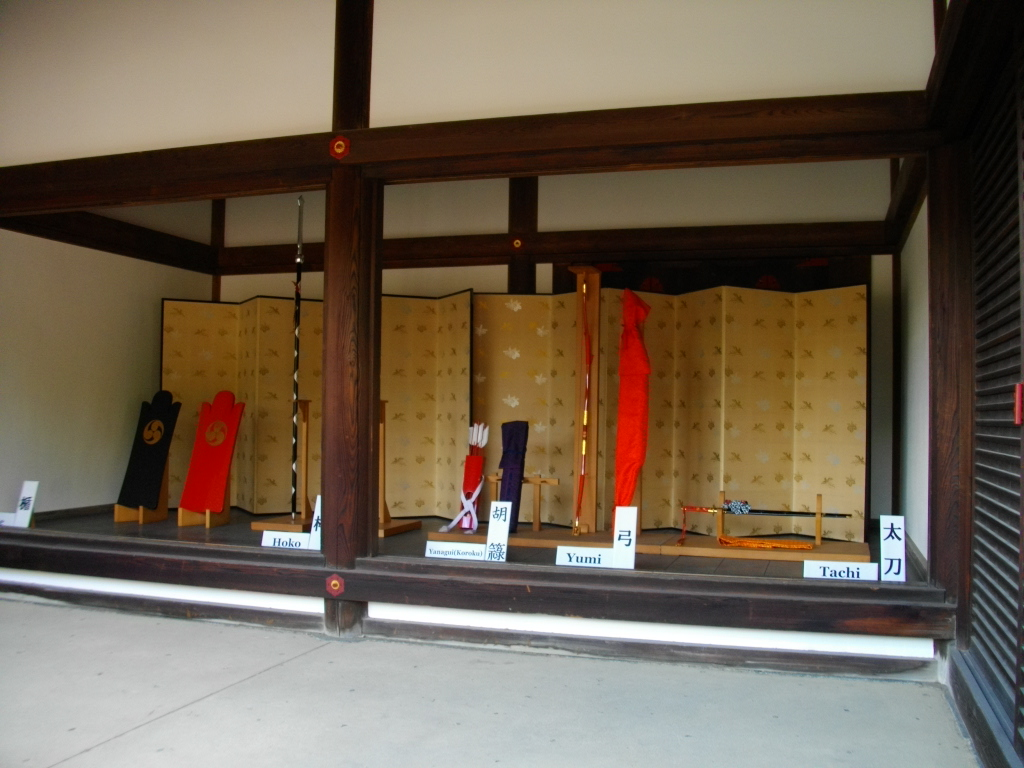
Ritual items from the enthronement of the Japanese emperor

After a ritual bath, the emperor is dressed entirely in the white silk dress of a Shinto priest, but with a special long train. Surrounded by courtiers (some of them carrying torches), the emperor solemnly enters first the enclosure and then each of these huts in turn and performs the same ritual—from 6:30 to 9:30 PM in the first, and in the second from 12:30 to 3:30 AM on the same night. A mat is unrolled before him and then rolled up again as he walks, so that his feet never touch the ground. A special umbrella is held over the sovereign's head, in which the shade hangs from a phoenix carved at the end of the pole and prevents any defilement of his sacred person coming from the air above him. Kneeling on a mat situated to face the Grand Shrine of Ise, as the traditional gagaku court music is played by the court orchestra, the emperor makes an offering of the sacred rice, the sake made from this rice, millet, fish and a variety of other foods from both the land and the sea to the kami, the offerings of east and west being made in their corresponding halls. Then he eats some of this sacred rice himself, as an act of divine communion that consummates his singular unity with Amaterasu-ōmikami, thus making him (in Shinto tradition) the intermediary between Amaterasu and the Japanese people. He then prays to the gods in gratitude, and then leaves the huts.

== Gallery ==
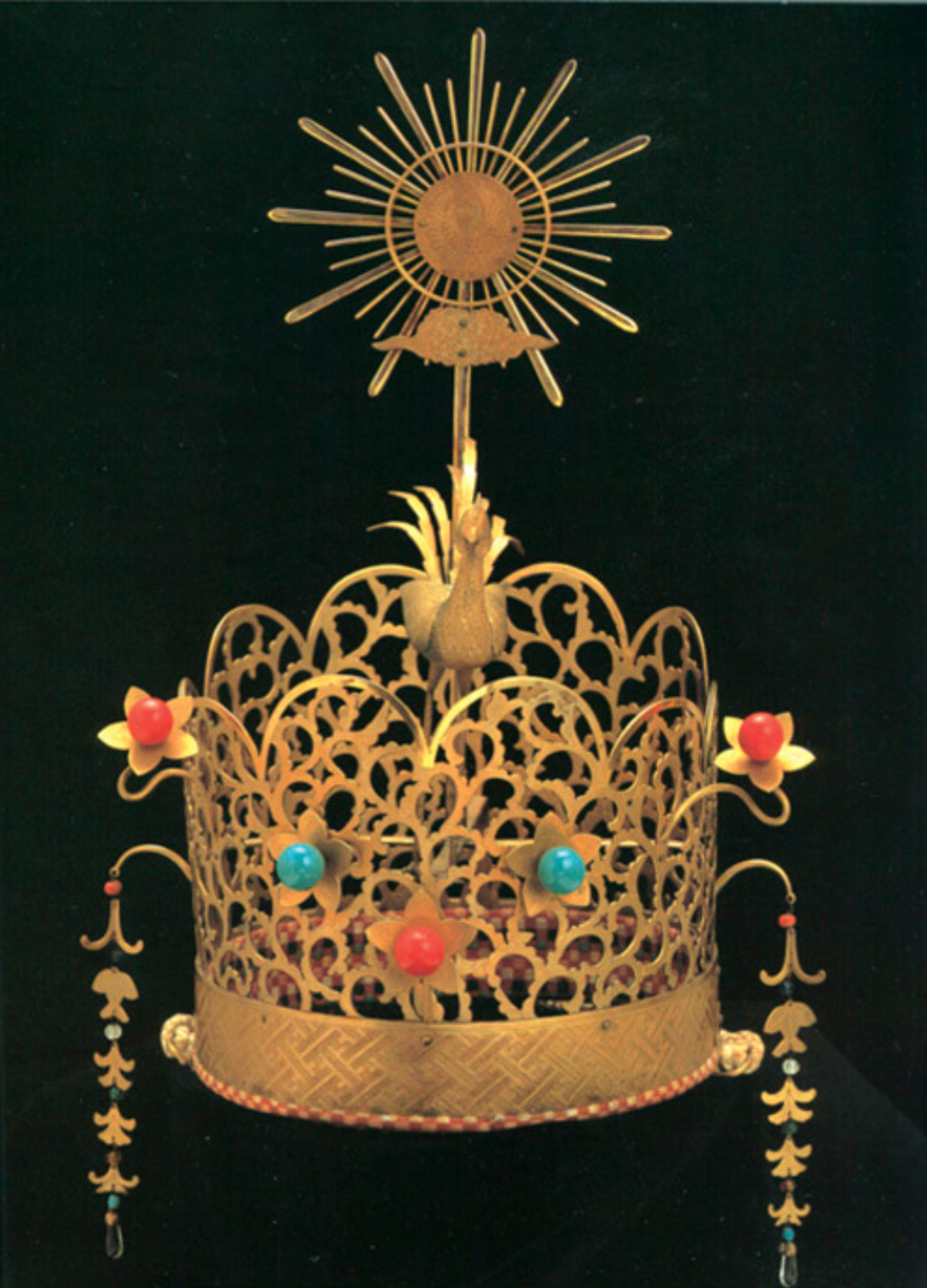
The Imperial Crown of Empress Go-Sakuramachi, used for her enthronement.

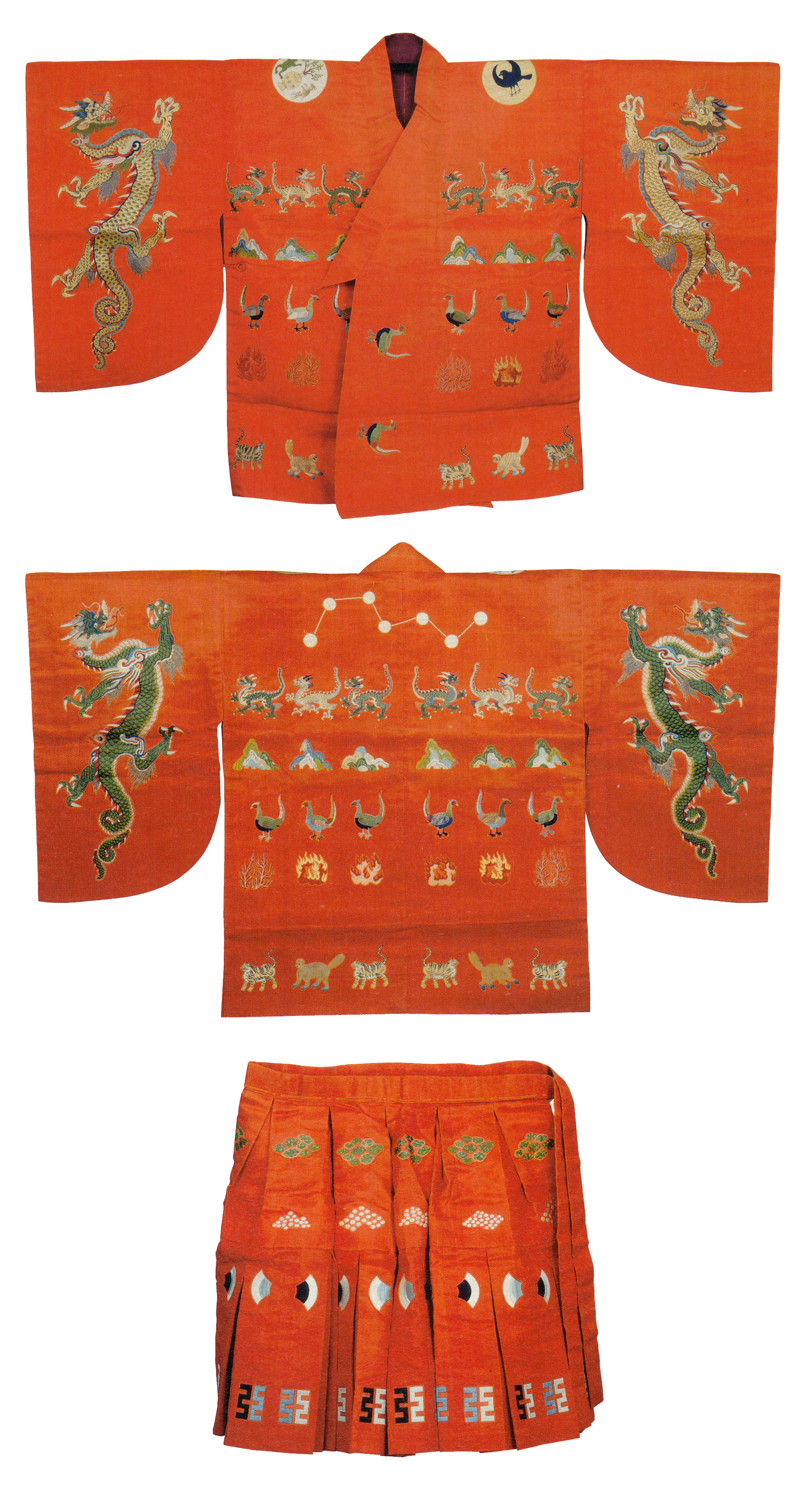

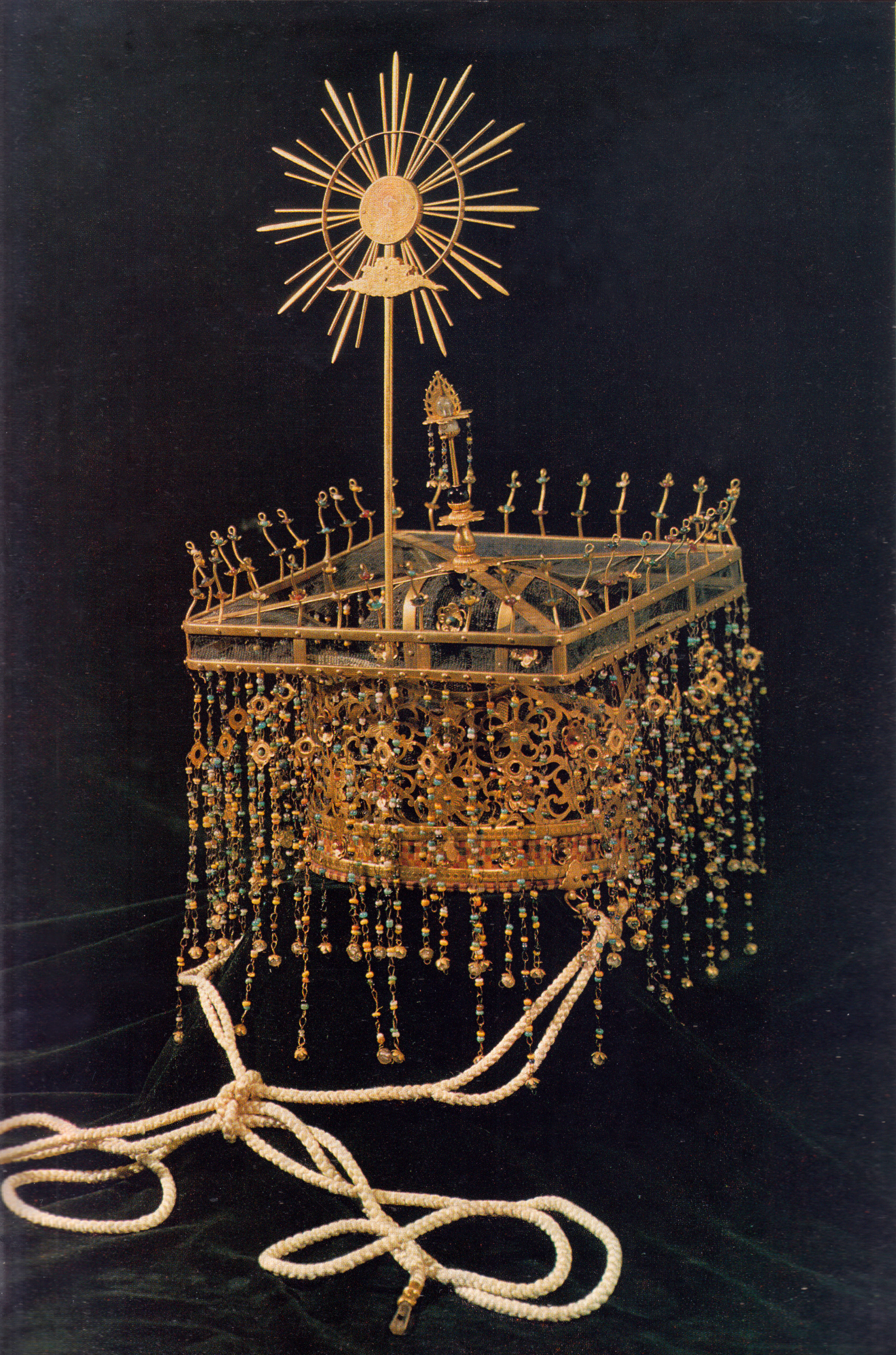
Benkan of Emperor Kōmei

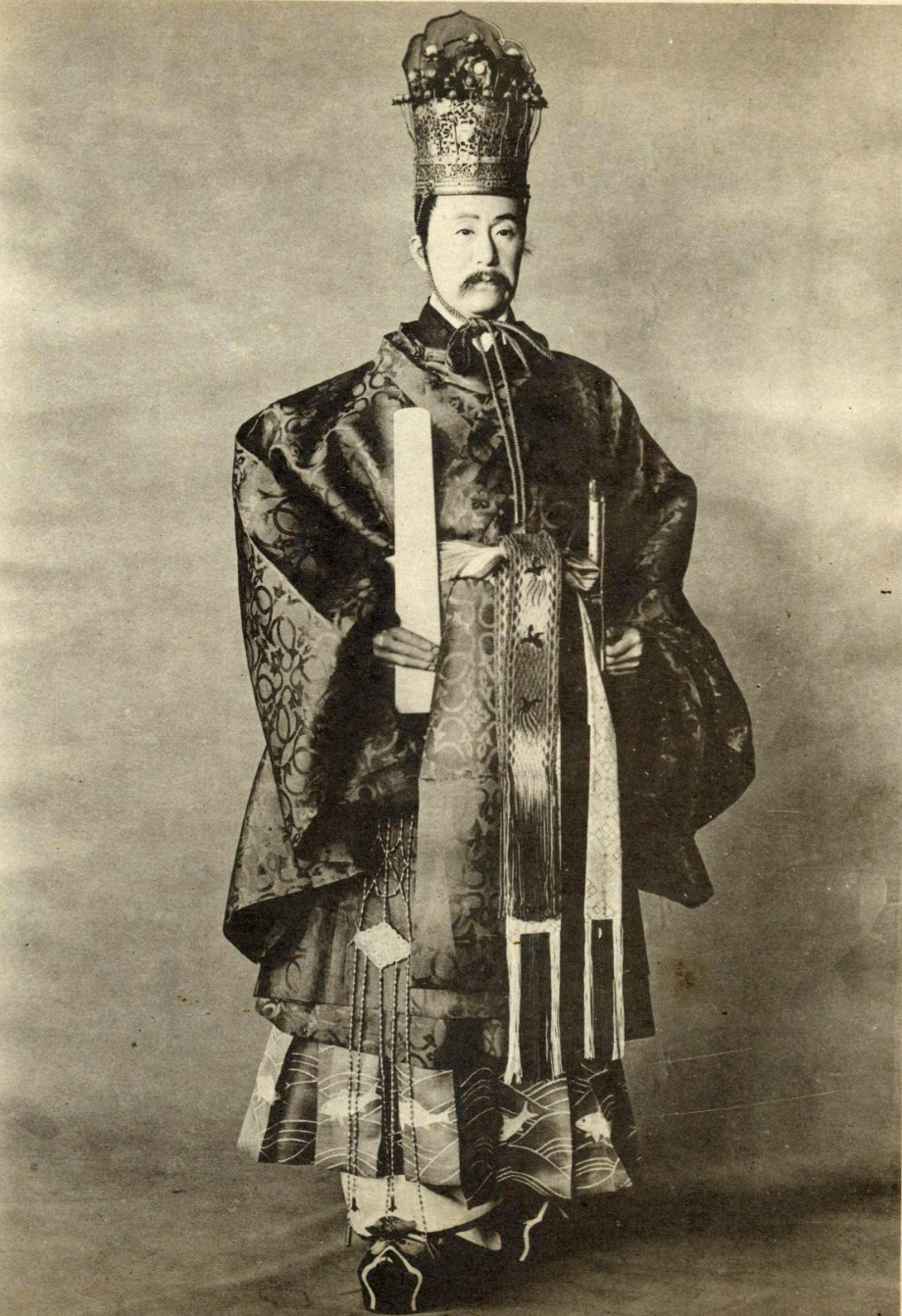
Pre-Meiji period ceremonial outfit of civil mandarins

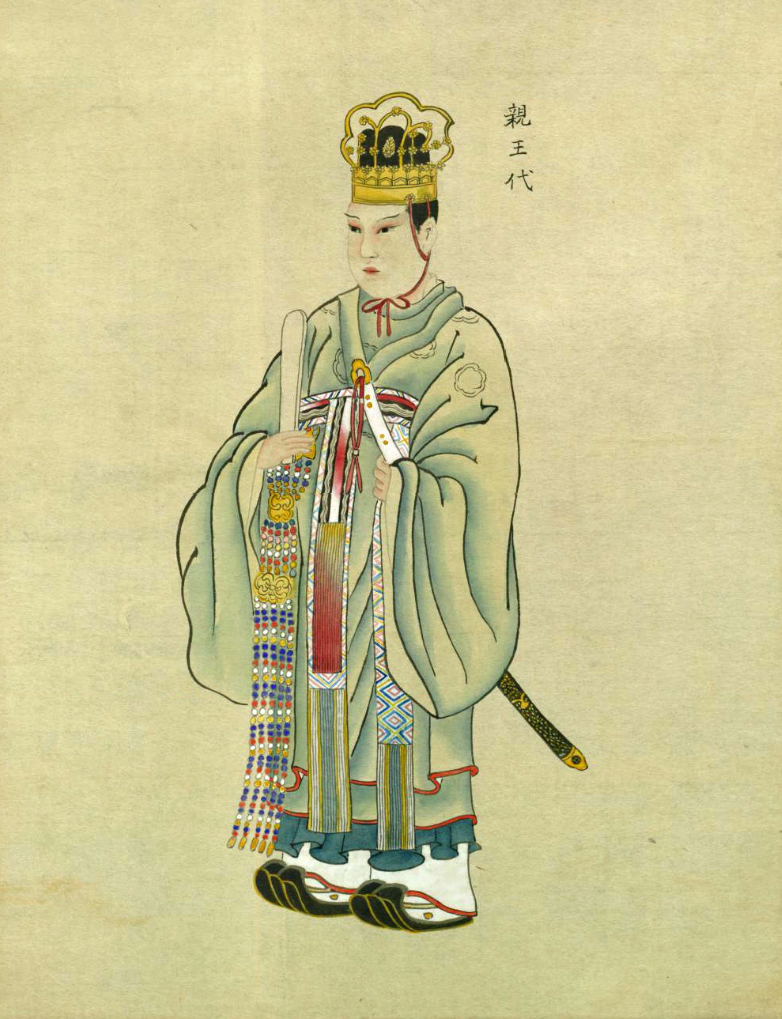
Pre-Meiji period ceremonial outfit of civil mandarins

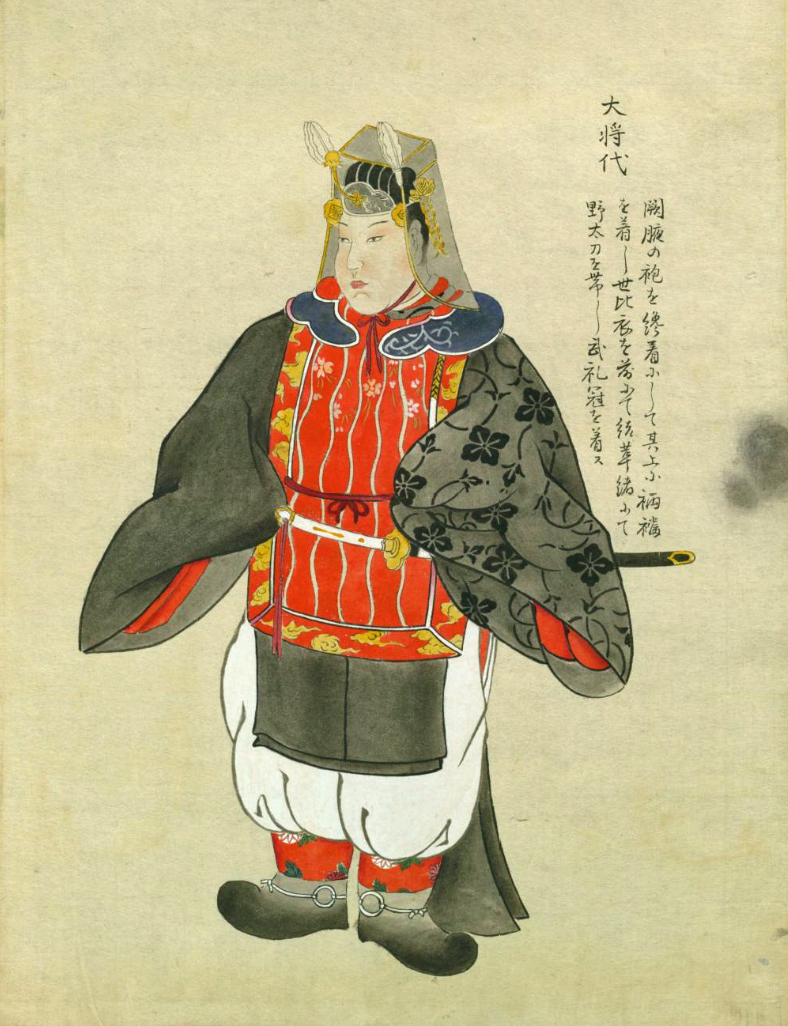
Pre-Meiji period ceremonial outfit of military mandarins

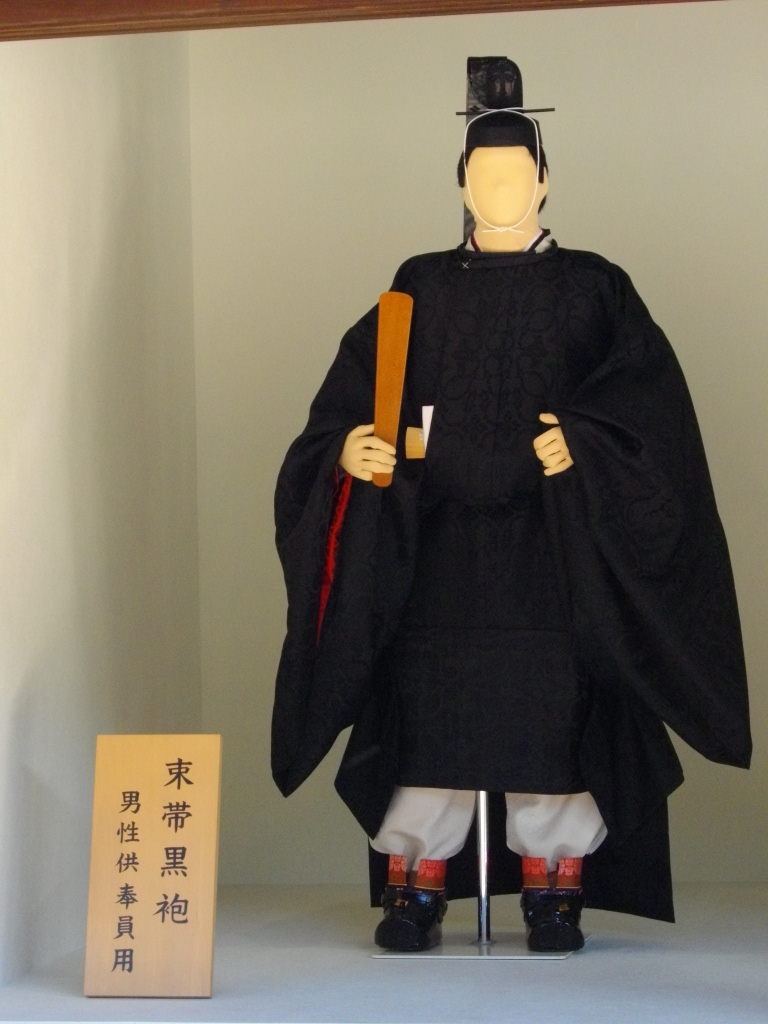

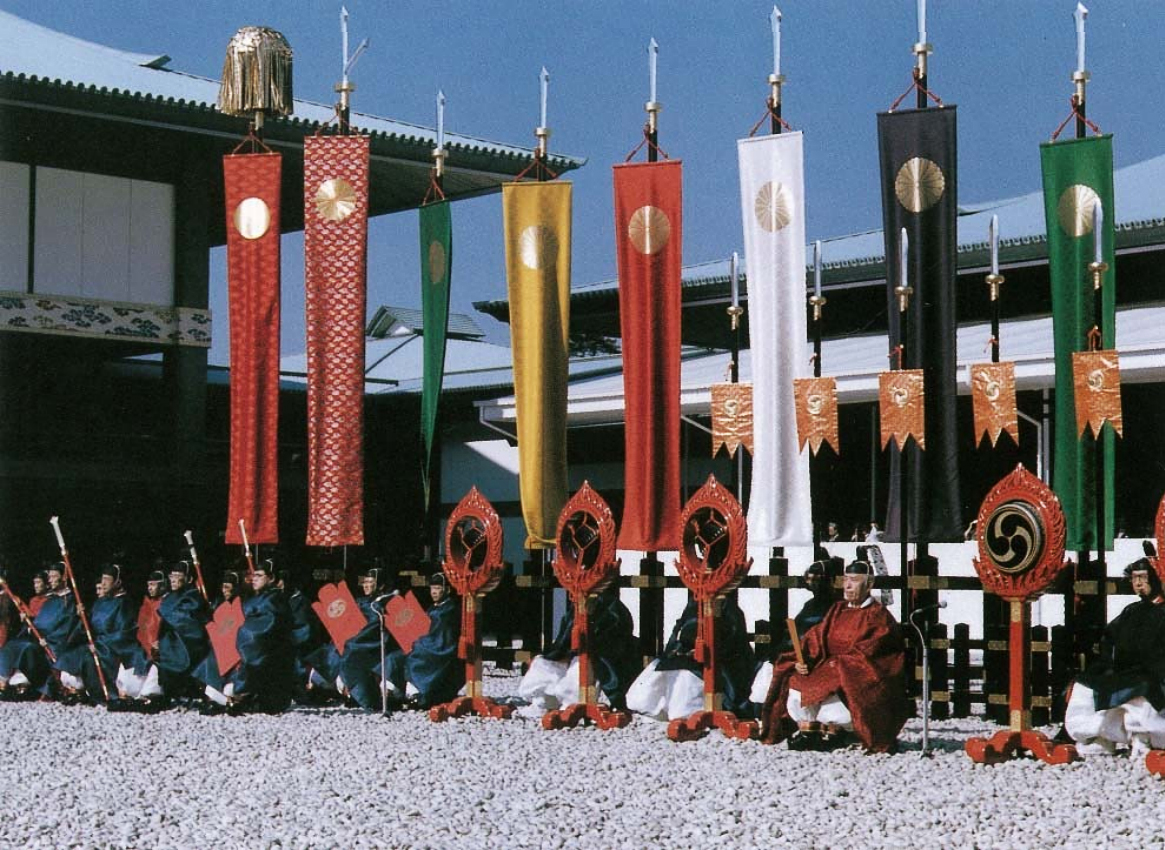

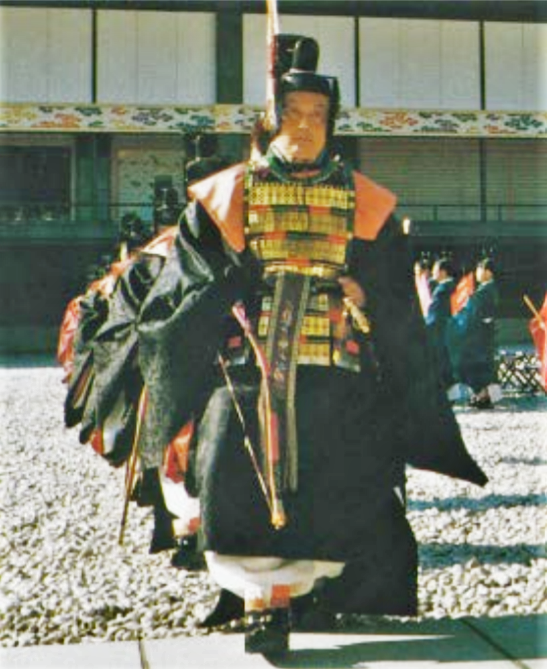

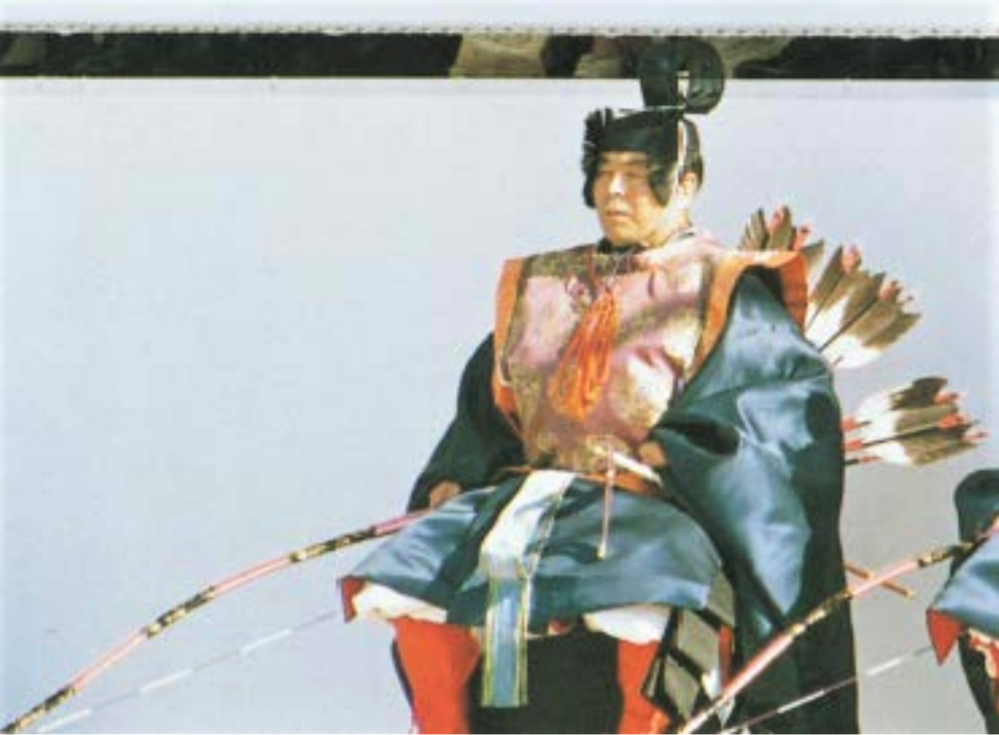

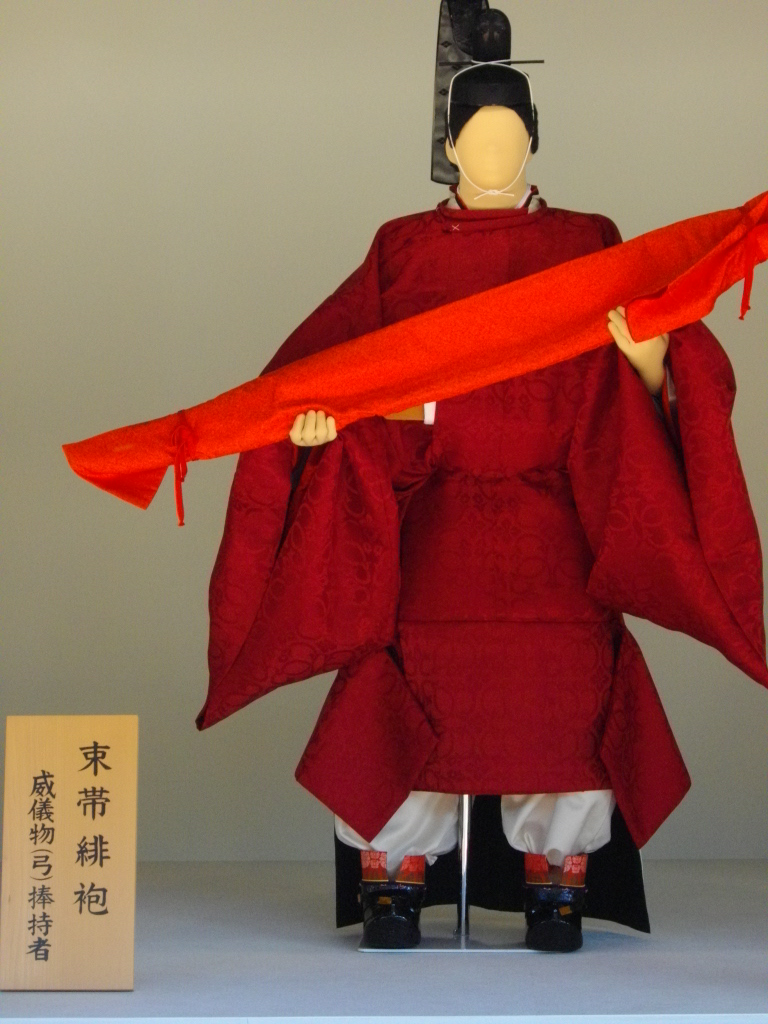

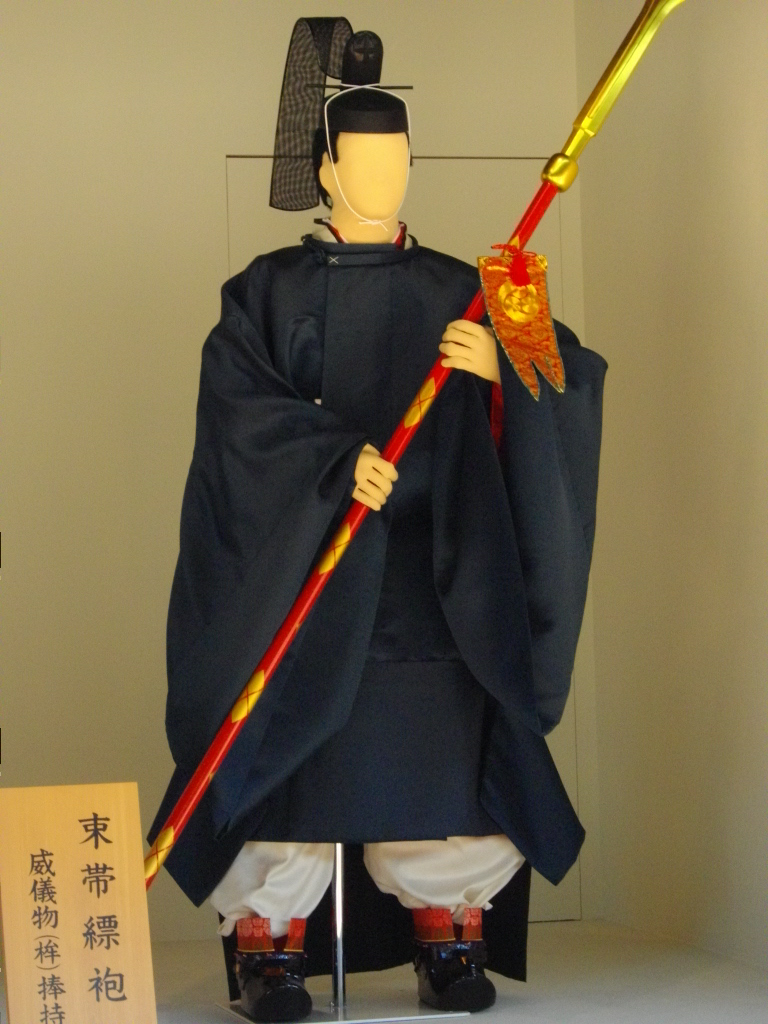

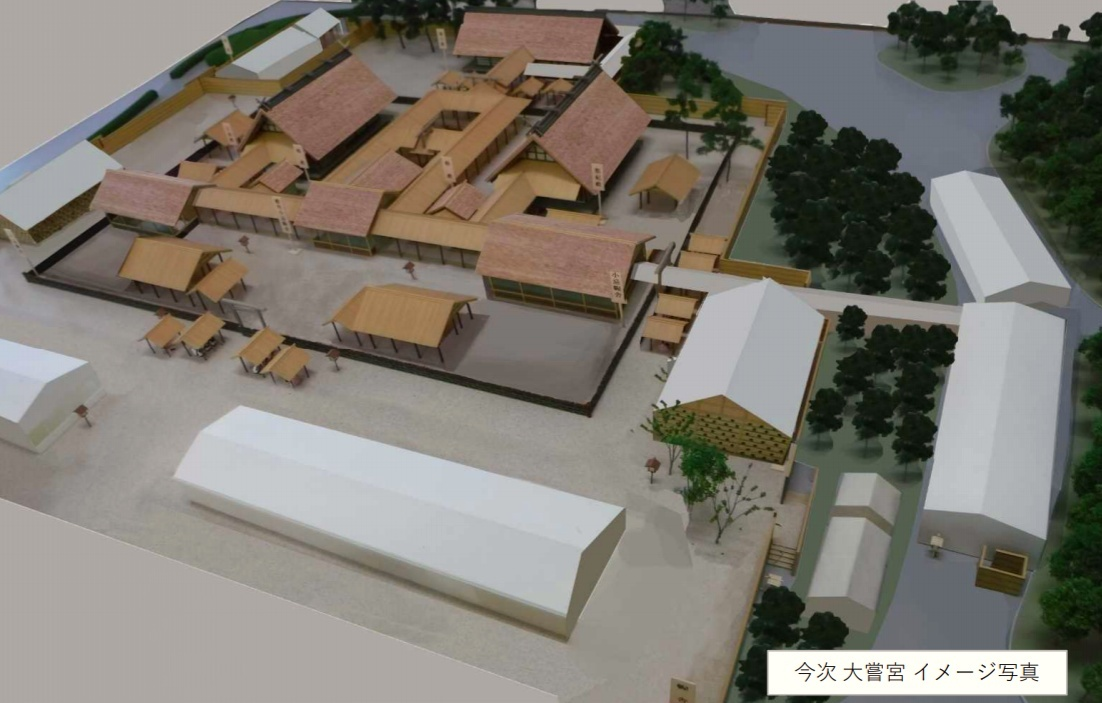
Mockup, layout plan for pavilions in the Daijōkyū for the Daijōsai ceremony in November 2019.

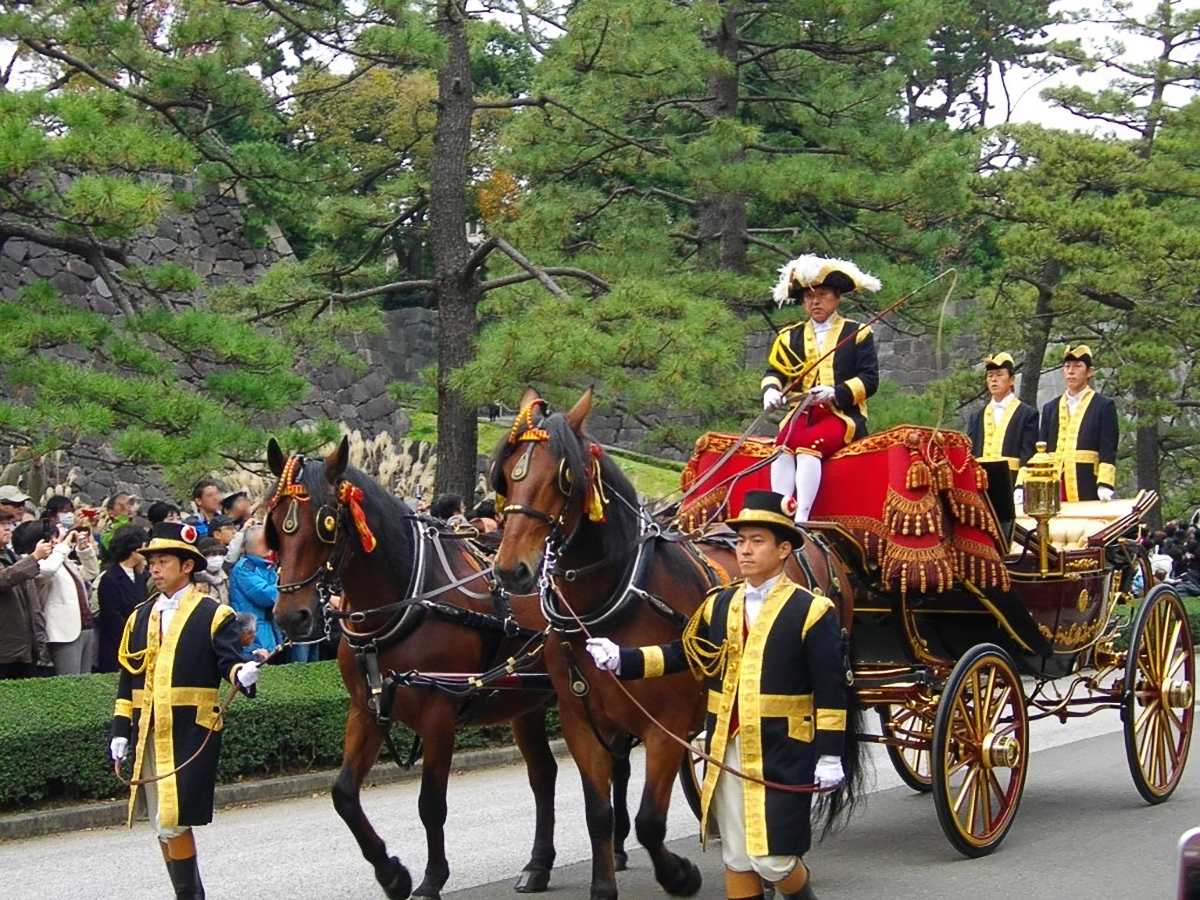
Kareta, Special Parade of the Ceremonial Horse-Drawn Carriages 2009

== See also ==
- Japanese Imperial Rituals
