= Mirrors in Shinto =

Sacred mirrors used in Shinto

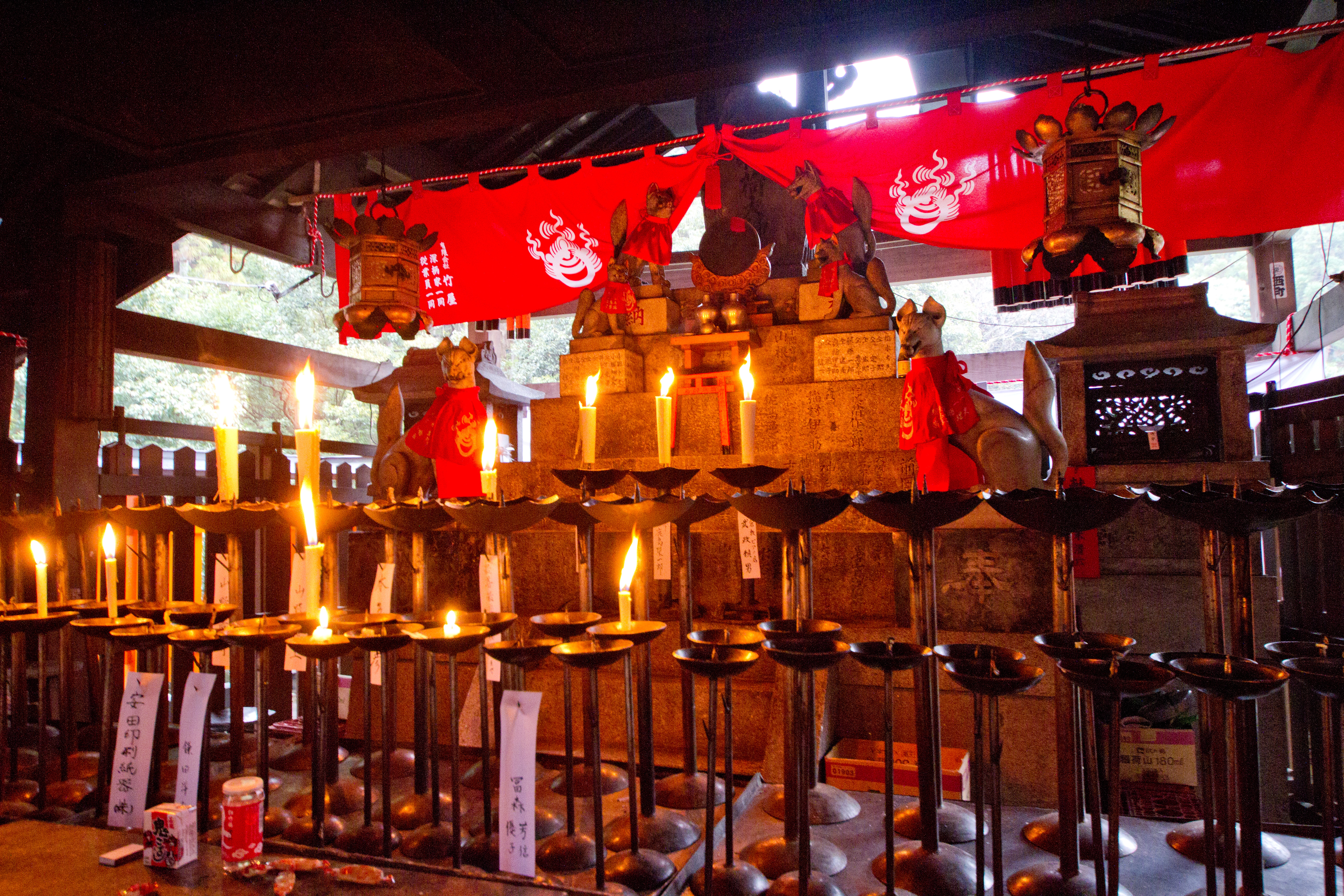
A mirror on an altar at Fushimi Inari-taisha.

A shinkyō (神鏡; "divine/sacred mirror") is a ritual mirror used in Shinto. Some mirrors are enshrined in the main hall of a shrine as a sacred object of the divine spirit, or are placed in front of the deity in a hall of worship. Mirrors in ancient Japan represented truth because they merely reflected what was shown, and thus were a source of much mystique and reverence. Japanese folklore is rich in stories of life before mirrors were commonplace.

The Yata no Kagami, one of the Three Sacred Treasures, is a particular sacred mirror.

== Significance ==
Spirits are enshrined in divine mirrors as shintai. Mirrors are believed to have been used to reflect sunlight during Sun-Worship, creating optical effects.

In the Nihon Shoki, Amaterasu tells her grandson, Ninigi-no-Mikoto, "Take this and revere it as if it were myself".

It is believed a mirror helps a believer see a true image of themselves and their devotion and worshipping the divine within themselves.

Ancient Chinese theologians believed the soul to be a circular disk, so the usage of a circular mirror was seen as reflecting this.

== History of divine mirrors ==
It is said that the origin of the divine mirror dates back to Ancient China. In China, much older divine mirrors have been unearthed than in Japan, and compared to the oldest mirror in Japan, the "Four divine mirrors with a rectangular shape inscribed in the third year of Seiryu," which is dated to 235 A.D., the oldest divine mirror in China is the "Leaf Vein Mirror (葉脈文鏡, Yōmyaku bun kagami)," which is an order of magnitude older than Japan, dating from 1600 to 770 B.C. In addition, according to the Wajinden, Himiko, queen of the Yamatai Kingdom, sent an envoy to Wei and received a hundred bronze mirrors from Wei, suggesting that Japan's divine mirror culture is an import from China.

The divine mirror at Iishi Shrine in Hyōgo Prefecture is said to have been introduced by a naturalized celestial spear from Silla. On the other hand, the former Ministry of the Imperial Household issued a notice to official national shrines founded after 1895 (28th year of Meiji) that their sacred objects should be divine mirrors.

== Types of divine mirrors ==
=== Goryo Shintai ===
In Shinto shrines and the imperial court, mirrors are often used as Shintai. The regulations state, "The diameter of the mirror shall be 1 shaku for the heavenly deities and emperors, and 7 shaku for the nobles. The name of the deity shall be engraved on the reverse side, a red cord shall be attached to a knob, and it shall be placed in a brocade pouch. The mirror may be wrapped in silk and placed in the hidai, then in the funadai, and then covered with the bedding.

== See also ==
- Bronze mirror
- Suda Hachiman Shrine Mirror
- Yata no Kagami

== Bibliography ==
- "Usa Hachiman and the Mysteries of Ancient divine mirrors" (Author: Enzumi Tamura, Haruhiko Kimura, Yutaka Momosaka Edition: Ebisu Kosho Shuppan)
