= Yata no Kagami =

Sacred mirror that is part of the Imperial Regalia of Japan

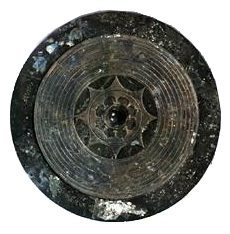
Artist's impression of Yata no Kagami

Yata no Kagami (八咫鏡) is a sacred bronze mirror that is part of the Imperial Regalia of Japan.

== Name and significance ==
The Yata no Kagami represents "wisdom" or "honesty," depending on the source. Its name literally means "The Eight Ata Mirror," a reference to its size. Mirrors in ancient Japan represented truth because they merely reflected what was shown, and were objects of mystique and reverence (being uncommon items).

According to Shinsuke Takenaka at the Institute of Moralogy, Yata no Kagami is considered the most precious of the three sacred treasures.

== History ==
In the year 1040 (Chōkyū 1, 9th month), the compartment which contained the Sacred Mirror was burned in a fire. The mirror was not damaged and managed to survive the incident. It is considered to be housed today in Ise Grand Shrine, in Mie Prefecture, Japan, although a lack of public access makes this difficult to verify. Concurrently, a replica is enshrined in Three Palace Sanctuaries of the Imperial Palace in Tokyo.

== Mythology ==
In Shinto, the mirror was forged by the deity Ishikoridome; both it and the Yasakani no magatama were hung from a tree to lure out Amaterasu from a cave. They were given to Amaterasu's grandson, Ninigi-no-Mikoto, when he went to pacify Japan along with the sword Kusanagi. From there, the treasures passed into the hands of the Imperial House of Japan.

The researcher Shinsuke Takenaka said according to the legends, Amaterasu told Ninigi: "Serve this mirror as my soul, just as you would serve me, with clean mind and body."

== Replicas in contemporary ritual ==
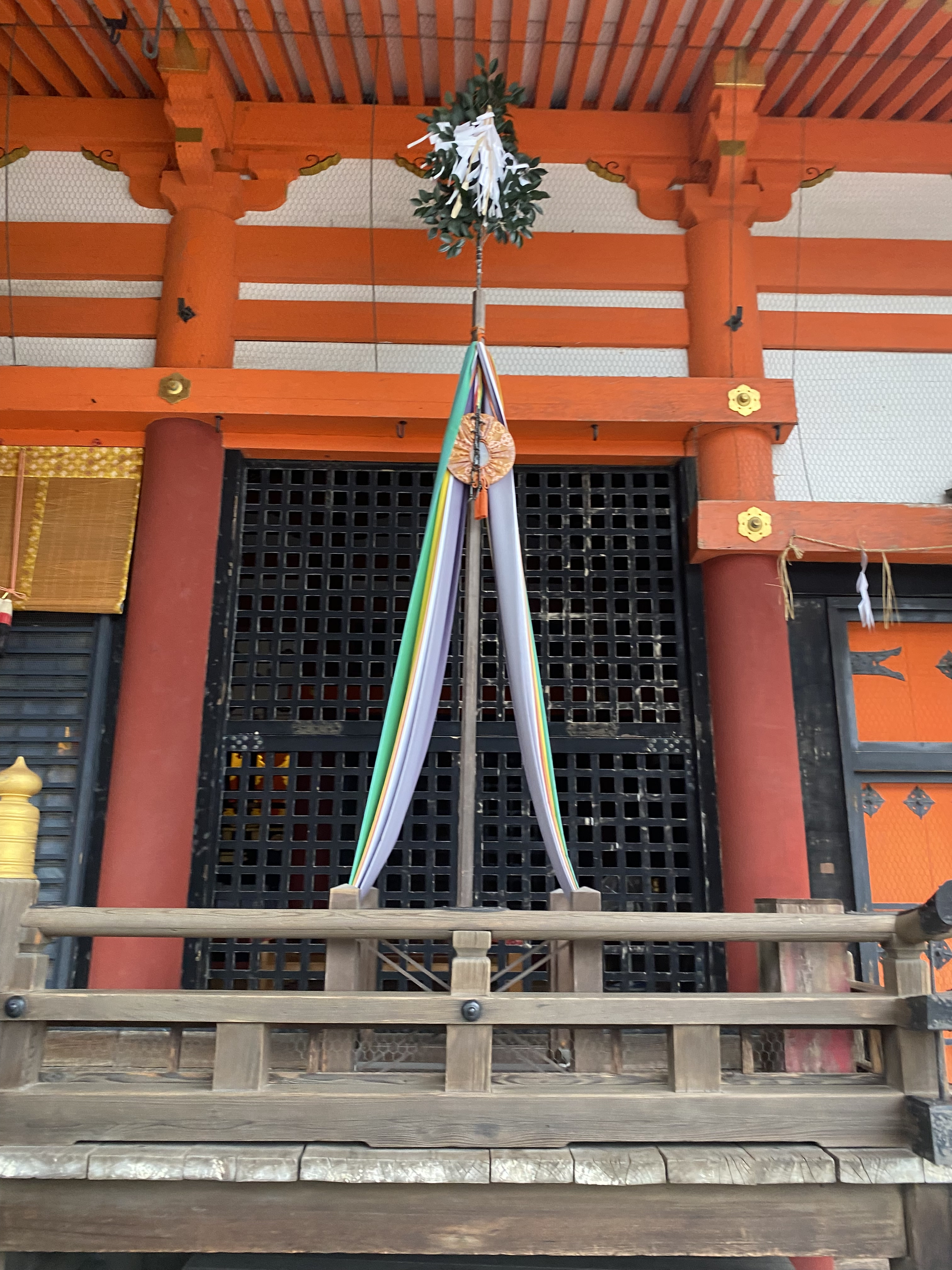
Right Masakaki at Yasaka Shrine featuring a Mirror and Magatama

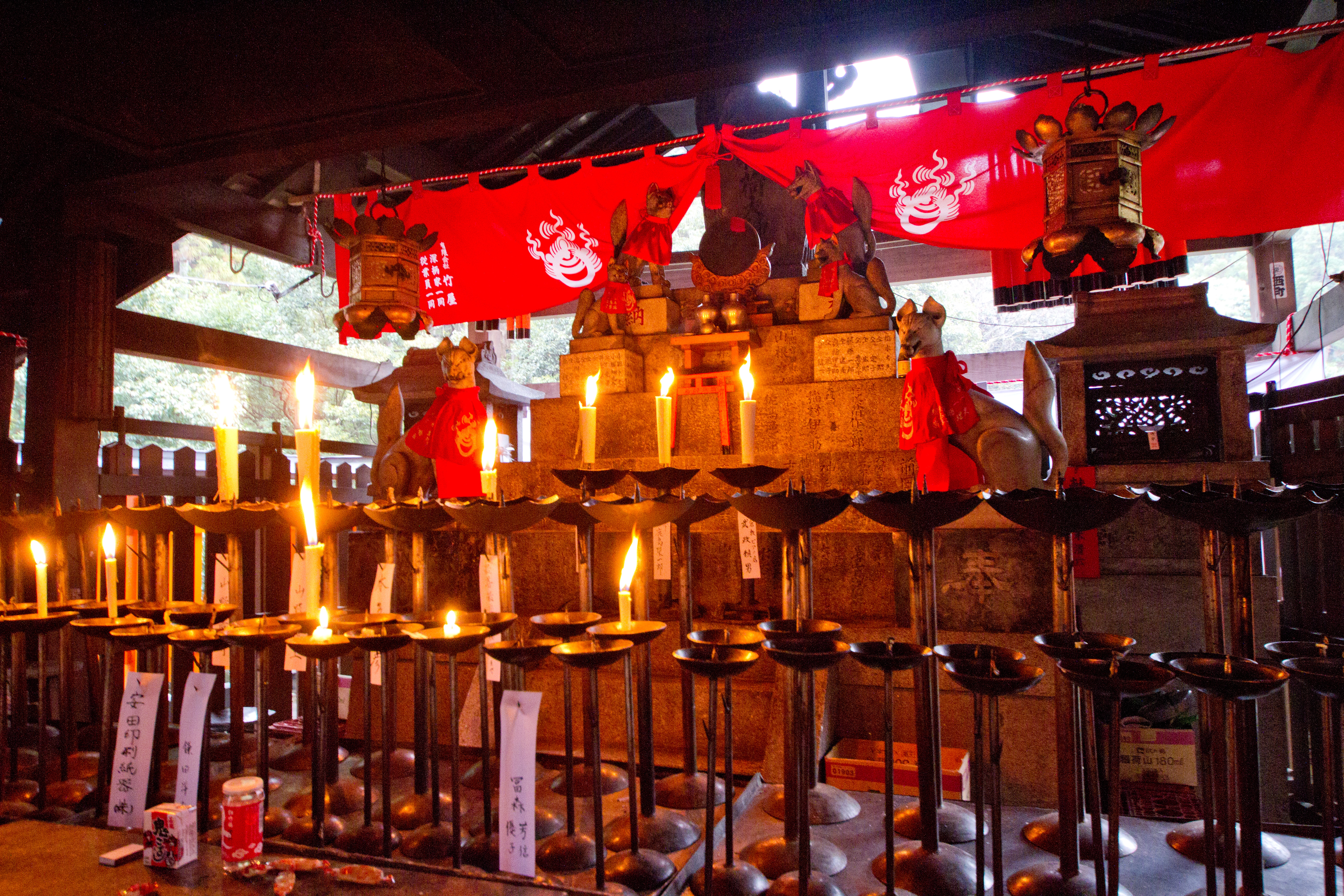
A mirror on an altar at Fushimi Inari-taisha, Yata-no-Kagami is seen as prototypical for the use of mirrors when worshipping other deities.

Replicas of the Imperial regalia of Japan including Yata no Kagami are included in Masakaki at Shinto shrines. Masakaki come in sets of two, with the left one containing a replica of Kusanagi no Tsurugi and the right one containing a replica of Yata no Kagami and Yasakani-no-Magatama. Mirrors in Shinto are highly significant with Yata no Kagami being seen as prototypical to them.

== In popular culture ==
A Yu-Gi-Oh! Trading Card Game card, Mitsurugi Mirror, was inspired by Yata no Kagami.

== See also ==
- Kashikodokoro Riding Car
- Shinju-kyo
