= Kyoto Imperial Palace =

Former ruling palace of the Emperor of Japan

Coordinates: 35°01′31″N 135°45′44″E

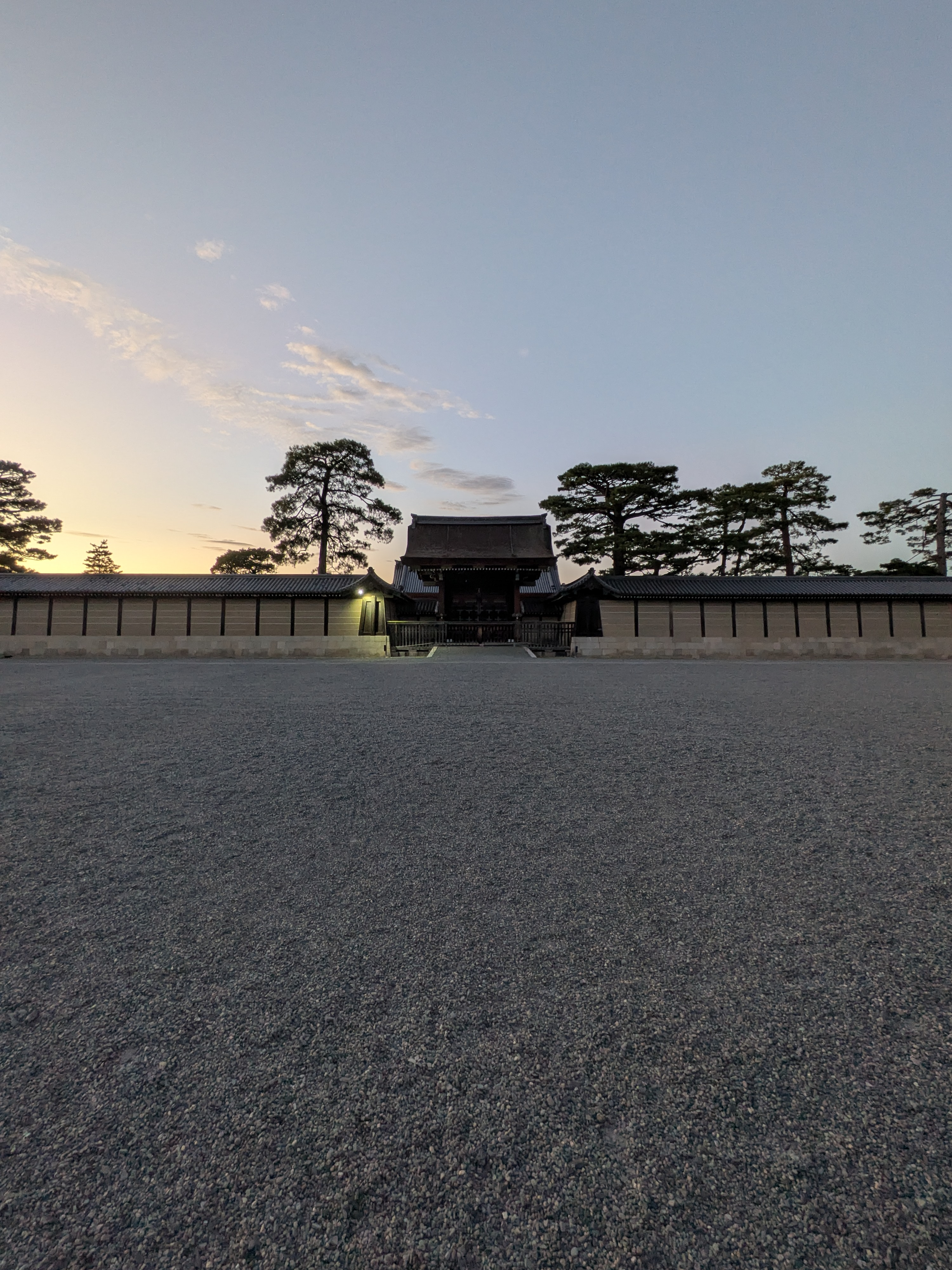
Kyoto Imperial Palace

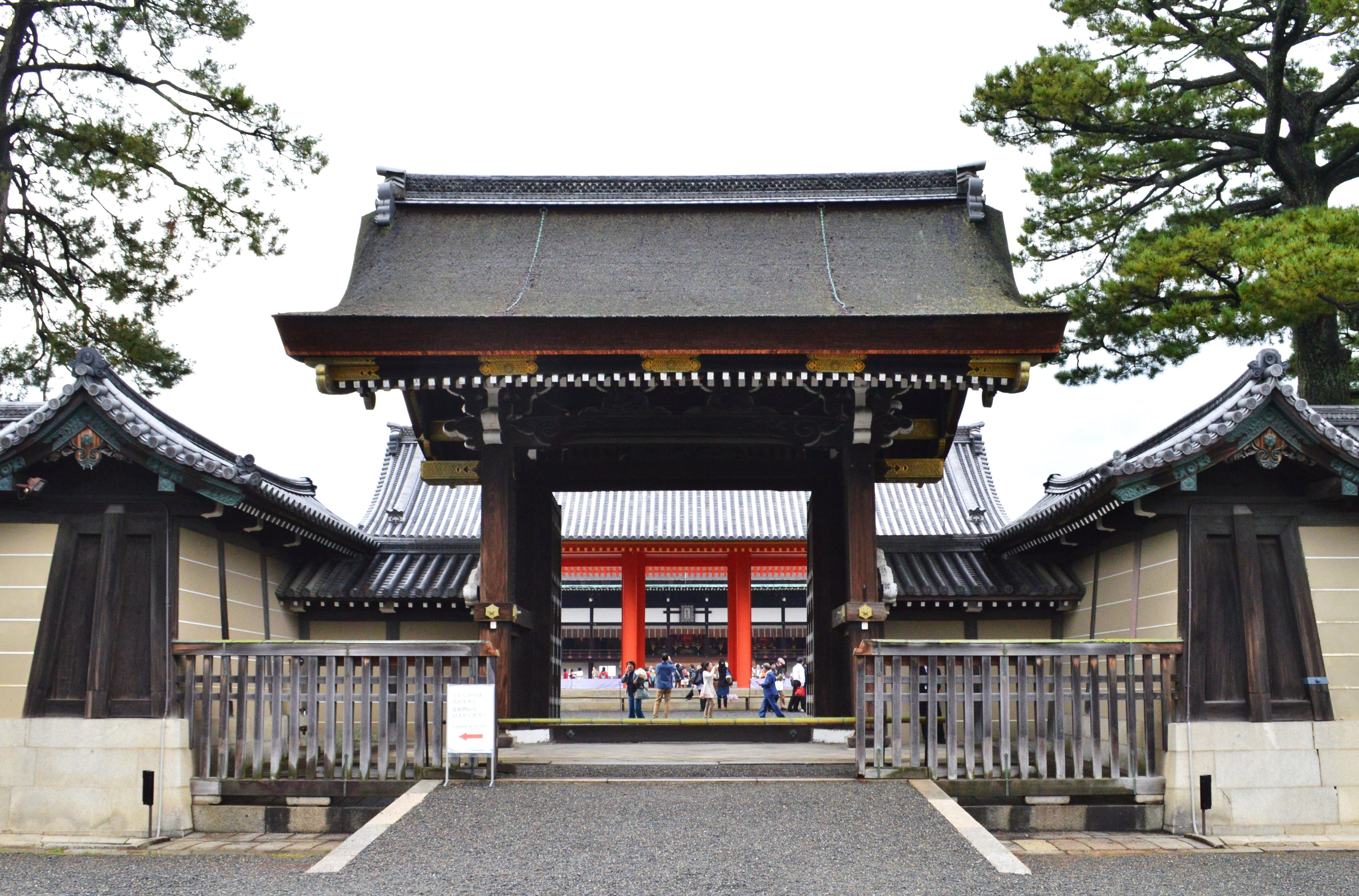
Kenrei-mon, the southern entrance used only by emperor to enter the palace

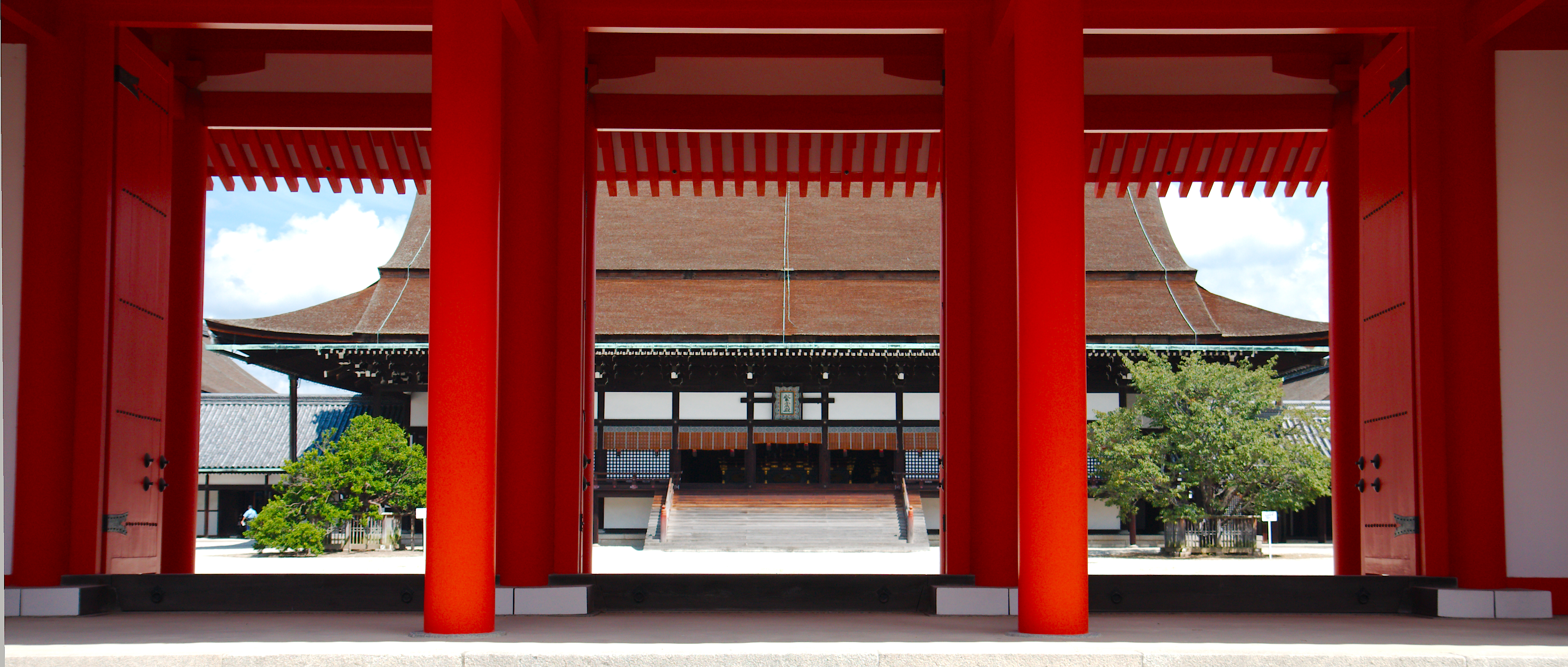
View through the Jomeimon gate on the Shishinden main hall

The Kyōto Imperial Palace (京都御所, Kyōto-gosho), also known as Dairi (内裏) or Kinri (禁裏), is the former palace of the Emperor of Japan from 1331 to 1869 located in Kamigyō-ku, Kyoto, Japan. Since the Meiji Restoration in 1869, the Emperors have resided at the Tokyo Imperial Palace, while the preservation of the Kyoto Imperial Palace was ordered in 1877. Today, the grounds are open to the public, and the Imperial Household Agency hosts public tours of the buildings several times a day.

The Kyoto Imperial Palace is the latest of the imperial palaces built in the northeastern part of the old capital of Heian-kyō (now known as Kyoto) after the abandonment of the Heian Palace that was located to the west of the current palace during the Heian period. The Palace lost much of its function at the time of the Meiji Restoration, when the capital functions were moved to Tokyo in 1869. However, Emperor Taishō and Shōwa still had their enthronement ceremonies at the palace.

== Layout ==
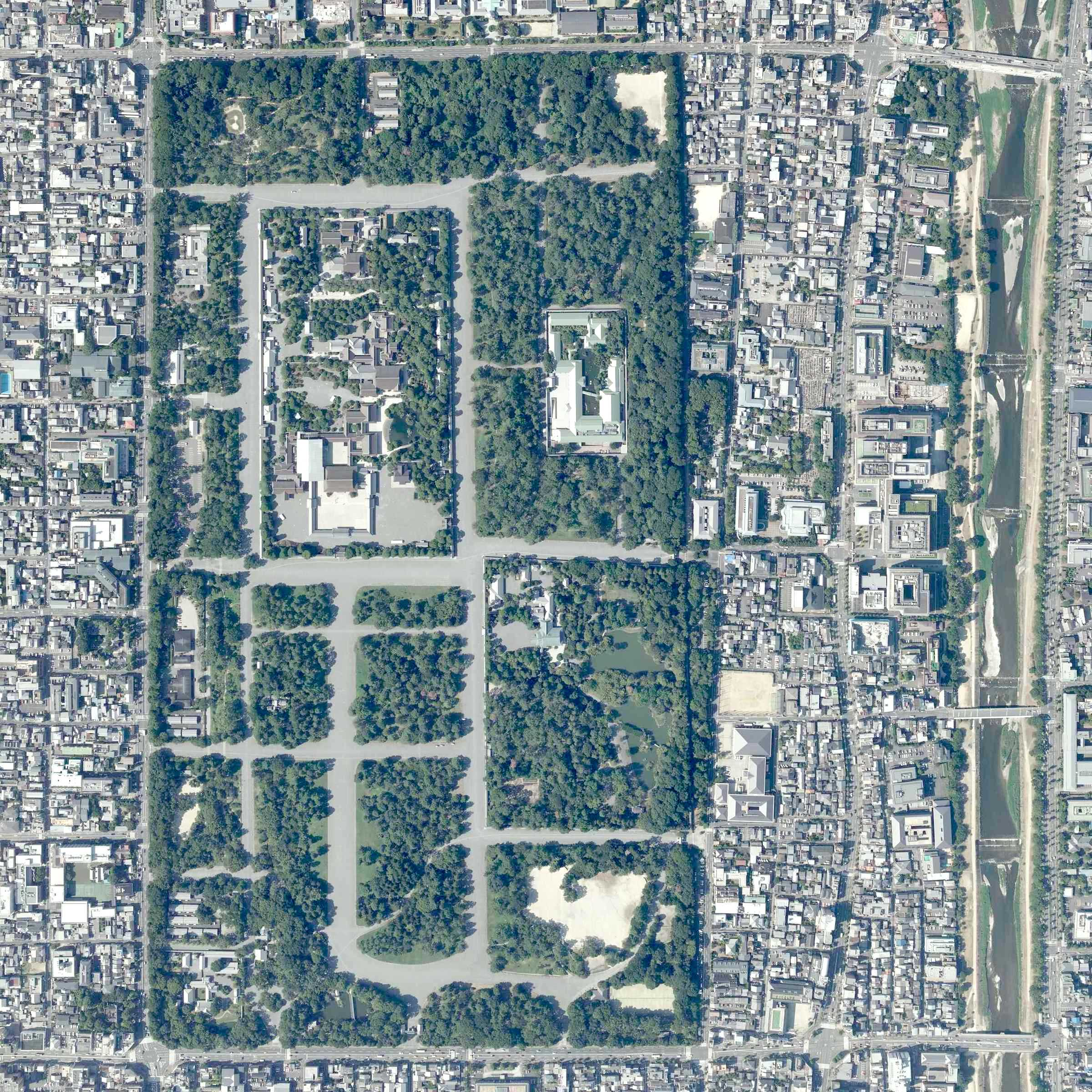
Aerial view of the Kyōto royal park in 2020 with the Imperial Palace in the northern part.

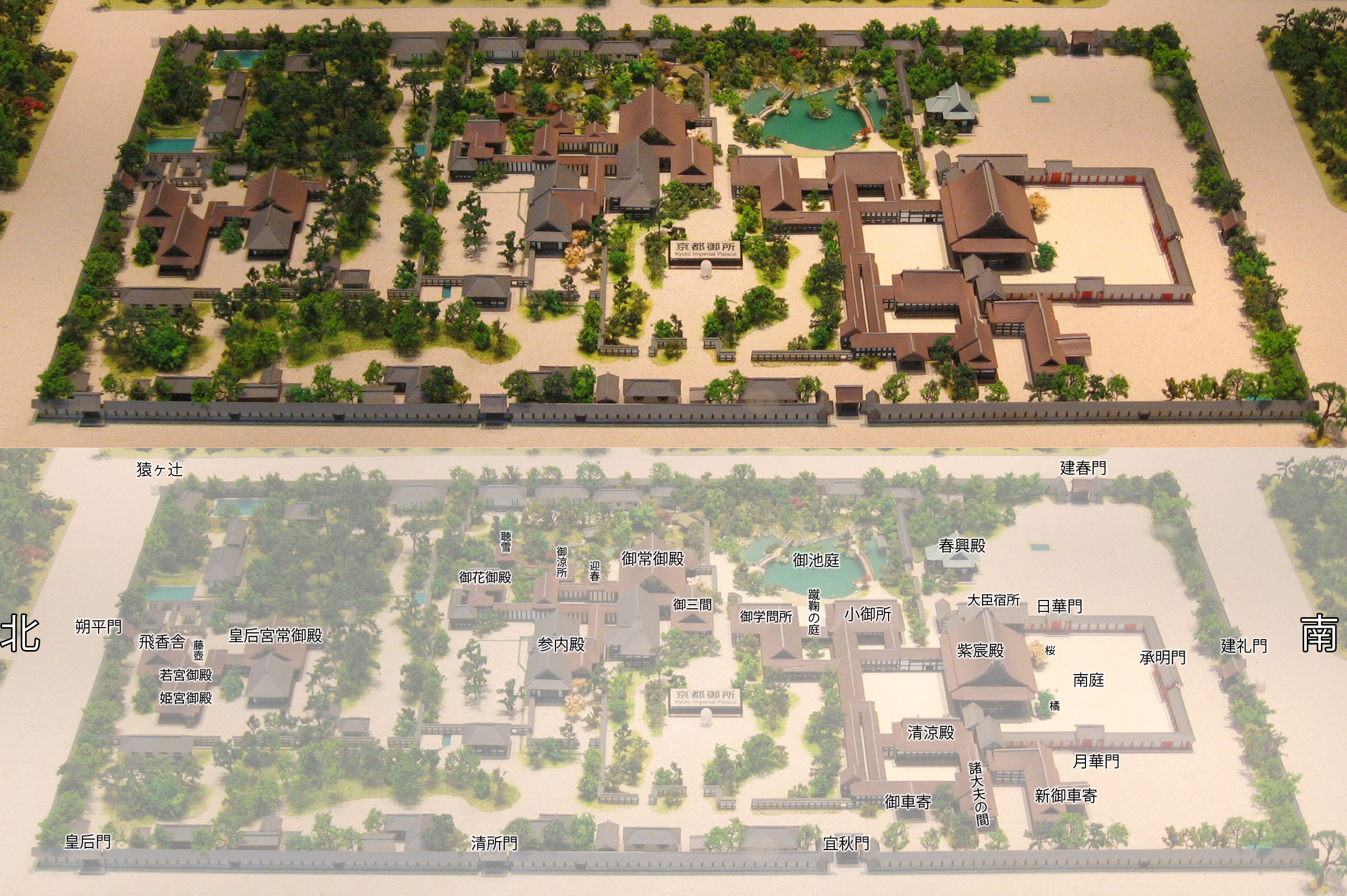
Scale model of Kyoto imperial palace.

The Palace is situated in the Kyōto-gyoen (京都御苑), a large rectangular enclosure 1,300 metres (4,300 ft) north to south and 700 metres (2,300 ft) east to west. It also contains the Sentō Imperial Palace gardens and the Kyoto State Guest House. The estate dates from the early Edo period when the residence of high court nobles were grouped close together with the palace and the area walled. When the capital was moved to Tokyo, the residences of the court nobles were demolished and most of Kyōto Gyoen is now a park open to the public.

== History ==
At the time of the Heian-kyo (13th year of the Enryaku era, 794), the Imperial Palace was located 1.7 kilometers west of the current Kyoto Imperial Palace along Senbon-dori Street. The current Kyoto Imperial Palace is located on the site of Tsuchimikado Higashinotoin Palace, one of the original temporary Imperial Palaces (temporary Imperial Palaces established in the event of fire). It served as the location of the Northern Court Imperial Palace from the mid-14th century, and continued to be used as main residence until Emperor Meiji's relocating to Tokyo in 1869. Since the Meiji era, it has also been called the Kyoto Imperial Palace.

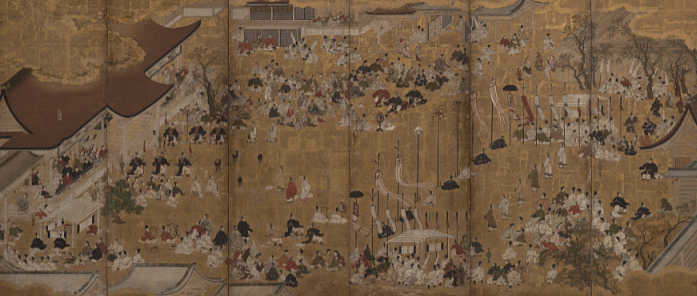
Painting of Empress Meishō's Enthronement ceremony Kyoto Imperial Palace.

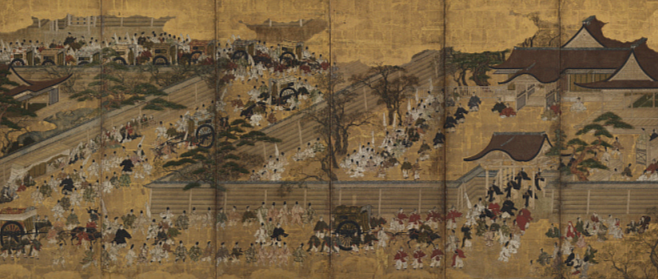
The enthronement of Empress Meishō at Kyoto Imperial Palace

The Imperial Palace has been officially located in this area since the final abandonment of the Heian Palace in late 12th century. However, it was already much earlier that the de facto residence of the Emperors was often not in the Inner Palace (内裏, dairi) of the original Heian period palace, but in one of the temporary residences (里内裏, sato-dairi) in this part of the city and often provided to the Emperor by powerful noble families. The present palace is a direct successor—after iterations of rebuilding—to one of these sato-dairi palaces, the Tsuchimikado Dono (土御門殿, Tsuchimikado-dono) of the Fujiwara clan. Tsuchimikado Higashinotoin mansion was occupied by Emperor Kōmyō, the second emperor of the Northern Court, on September 26, 1337 (September 2, 4th year of the Kenmu era) and continued to be used for approximately 530 years, until Emperor Meiji moved the capital to Tokyo. Originally, the site was one cho (approx. 1 cho) east to west and half a cho (approx. 1 cho) north to south, but the site was expanded by Ashikaga Yoshimitsu, and later renovated by Oda Nobunaga and Toyotomi Hideyoshi, resulting in the current appearance. The Imperial Palace was rebuilt eight times during the Edo period alone: in the Keicho era (1613), Kan'ei era (1642), Sho'o era (1655), Kanbun era (1662), Enpo era (1675), Hoei era (1709), Kansei era (1790), and Ansei era (1855). Of these, the Keicho and Kan'ei eras involved the demolition of the old palace. The version currently standing was completed in 1855, with an attempt at reproducing the Heian period architecture and style of the original dairi of the Heian Palace.

The 11th Shogun of Tokugawa Shogunate, Tokugawa Ienari ordered the to rebuild the palace based on the ancient book "Daidairi Kosho" by Uramatsu Kozen that had recorded the detail of old Dairi of Heian palace in 1790 (Kansei 2). Subsequently, on April 6 to 7, 1854 (Kaei 7), a fire broke out at the residence of Kojun-in (chief samurai) in the Shiba Palace of the Omiya Imperial Palace, located southeast of the Imperial Palace and the Imperial Palace was destroyed.

The current construction was carried out by the 13th Tokugawa Shogun, Iesada who ordered the reconstruction of the palace to be carried out by councilor Abe Masahiro at the request of Emperor Komei. Reconstruction began on November 23, 1855 (Ansei 2). It took on its current form between 1865 and February 1866. It is approximately eight times the size of Tsuchimikado Higashinotoin (13,000m2), the former site of the Kyoto Imperial Palace.

Emperor Meiji later visited the Imperial Palace at the same time as the capital was transferred to Tokyo in 1869 (Meiji 2). In 1877 (Meiji 10), Emperor Meiji lamented the state of the Kyoto Imperial Palace where the facilities and surrounding area had deteriorated in less than ten years since his return to Kyoto, then he ordered the Imperial Household Ministry to preserve the Kyoto Imperial Palace and maintain its original appearance. In 1883 (Meiji 16), he issued an imperial decree designating Kyoto as the location for the enthronement ceremony and Daijosai ceremony.

Currently, the Kyoto Imperial Palace, Kyoto Omiya Imperial Palace, and Kyoto Sento Imperial Palace are national properties and are classified as "Imperial Property" under the jurisdiction of the Imperial Household Agency, while the surrounding Kyoto Gyoen National Park is managed by the Ministry of the Environment.

The grounds include a number of buildings, along with the imperial residence. The neighboring building to the north is the sentō (仙洞), or residence of the retired Emperor, and beyond that, across Imadegawa Street, sits Doshisha University. The Imperial Household Agency maintains the building and the grounds and also runs public tours.

=== History of Tsuchimikado Higashinotoin mansion ===
Tsuchimikado-higashinotoin-dono" mansion (土御門東洞院殿) was built and owned by the Fujiwara clan in 9th century and it was used occasionally as the Sato-Dairi (Temporary palace) of emperor when his palace was under repaired. It is known that Emperor Horikawa used this mansion as his residence before his accession to the throne. In 1133, it was renovated to serve as the residence for Fujiwara no Tadazane's daughter, Yasushi, before being the nyogo (concubine) of retired emperor Toba. Yasushi was subsequently investitured as retired emperor Toba's Empress and in 1140, it was officially designated as her palace, known as "Tsuchimikado Palace" or "Ogimachi Palace." After her death, the palace became the residence of Fujiwara no Kunitsuna, but was briefly used as a temporary palace by Emperor Rokujo in 1167 and Emperor Takakura in 1177.

After 1191, Tsuchimikado Higashinotoin Palace became the property of Emperor Go-Shirakawa's daughter, Senyomon'in (Imperial Princess Kishi). However, because she favored Rokujo Palace, which was associated with her father. The Konoe family only occasionally rented it as a venue for ceremonies. However, this situation began to change dramatically when Rokujo Palace was burned down in 1208. Senyomon'in moved her imperial residence to Tsuchimikado Palace and also relocated the Chokodo Hall (長講堂), Goshirakawa's personal Buddhist hall, which had been located within Rokujo Palace. Later, the Chokodo Hall was rebuilt on the Rokujo Palace site, but the facilities within Tsuchimikado Palace remained under Chokodo's ownership and some Buddhist ceremonies were held there. For this reason, it was also called the "New Chokodo Hall" to distinguish it from the original Chokodo Hall. After Senyomon'in's death, it became the property of Emperor Go-Fukakusa and was given to his daughter, Yotokumon'in (Imperial Princess Koshi) as a temporary share, which it became the property of the Jimyoin line of imperial court later . The accessions of Emperor Hanazono and Emperor Kogon were also held at the Tsuchimikado Higashinotoin Palace in 1308 and 1332 respectively.

From the end of the Kamakura period through the Kenmu Restoration (reigns of Hanazono, Go-Daigo, Kogon, and Go-Daigo), the Imperial Palace was located at the Reizei Tomikoji Palace (泉富小路殿), which had the structure of a full-fledged Imperial Palace. However, it was destroyed by fire in 1336 (Kenmu 3). The newly established Northern Court, a branch of the Jimyoin lineage, temporarily established the Tsuchimikado Higashinotoin Palace, which had been ancestrally owned by the Jimyoin lineage, as its official imperial palace on (September 26, 1337). The Northern Court initially planned to fully rebuild the Heian Palace several times, but no progress was made. Eventually, Emperor Go-Kogon, the regent, came to the decision to continue using the Tsuchimikado Higashinotoin Palace. From then on, the Tsuchimikado Higashinotoin Palace became the permanent imperial palace until Meiji restoration. However, Emperor Go-Kogon still did not give up on the idea of building a fully-fledged Imperial Palace, as he initiated discussions about rebuilding the Kan'in Dairi (閑院内裏), a fully-fledged imperial palace from the early Kamakura period.

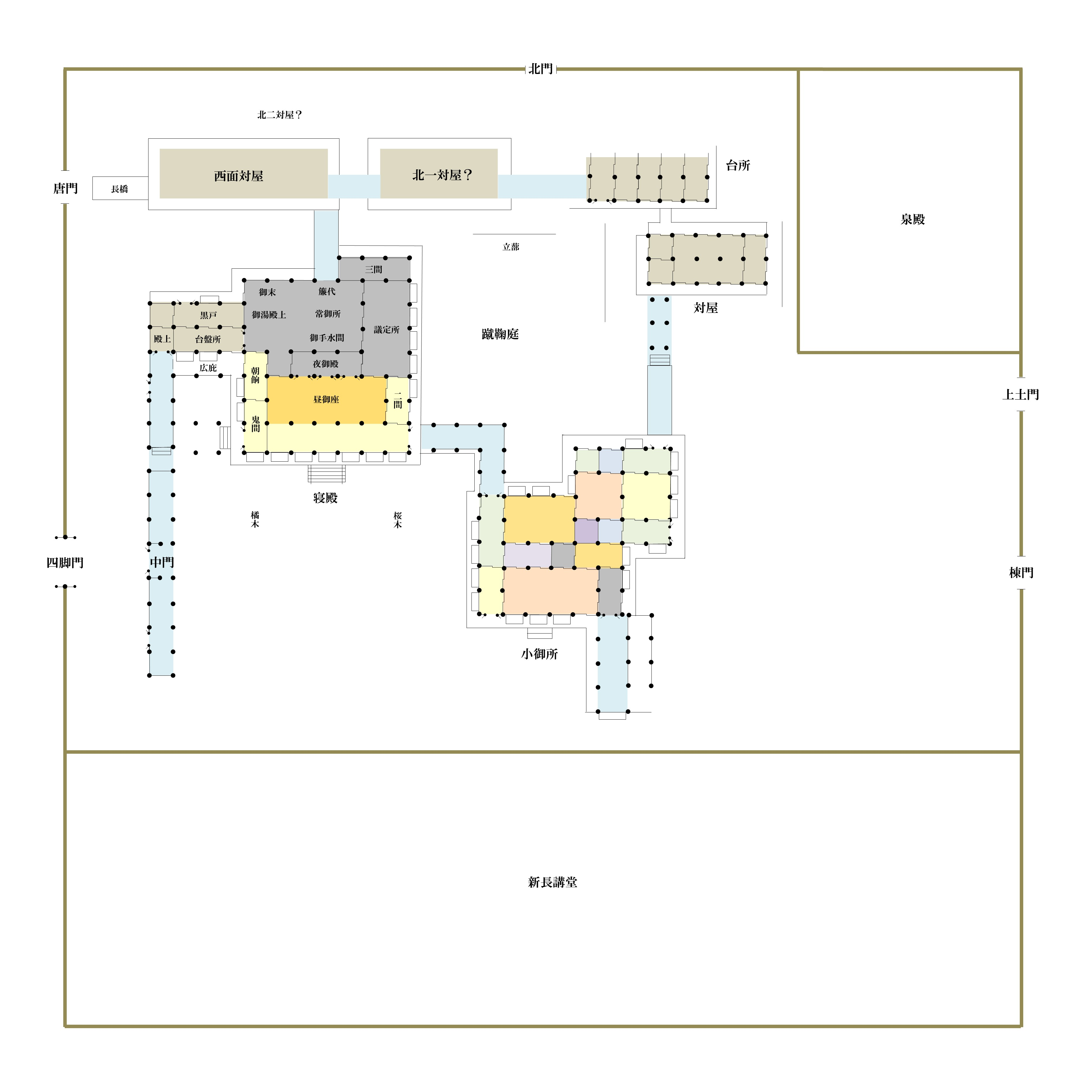
Outline of "Tsuchimikado-higashinotowin-dono" mansion (土御門東洞院殿) in early 14th century, used as official residence of emperor in Emperor Kōgon's reign.

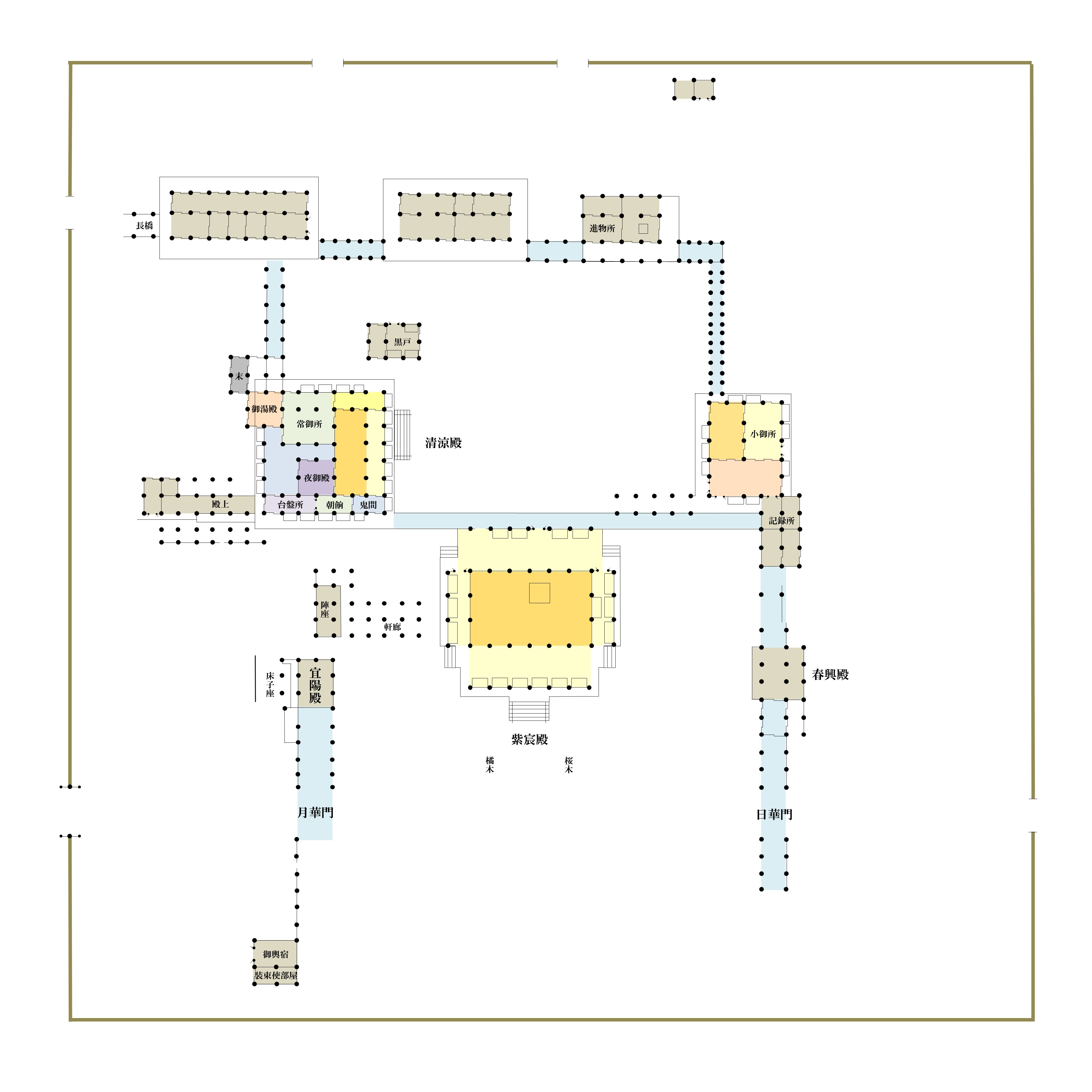
Outline of full-fledged palace rebuilt by donation of Shogun Ashikaga Yoshimitsu after 1401 fire.

However, plans of full-scale reconstruction of the imperial palace were once again scrapped and Tsuchimikado Higashinotoin Palace ended up serving as the Imperial Palace for five emperors of the Northern Court: Emperor Kōmyō, Emperor Sukō, Emperor Go-Kōgon, Emperor Go-En'yū, and Emperor Go-Komatsu. However, in 1401 during the reign of Emperor Go-Komatsu, Tsuchimikado Higashinotoin Palace was destroyed by fire. Ashikaga Yoshimitsu, the most powerful man at the time, was concerned that Tsuchimikado Higashinotoin Palace was small and insignificantly similar to a "subordinate residence" and decided to rebuild it as a full-scale Imperial Palace modeled after the Heian Palace. Yoshimitsu granted the land in Tsuchimikado Abura-no-Koji, removed the "Shincho-Kodo" and rebuilt Tsuchimikado Higashinotoin Palace, which covered the entire area of one town, with the functions of a full-scale Imperial Palace. Tsuchimikado Higashinotoin Palace continued to serve as the Imperial Palace thereafter. The Imperial Palace continued to expand and came to be known as the Kyoto Imperial Palace today.

== Structures ==
The main buildings are, among other halls, the Shishinden (紫宸殿; Hall for State Ceremonies), Seiryōden (清涼殿; Emperor's Habitual Residence), Kogosho (小御所; Court Room), Ogakumonjo (御学問所; Imperial Study or Library), and a number of residences for the Empress, high-ranking aristocrats and government officials. The layout of Kyoto's imperial palace was modeled after old residence of emperor in Heian Palace

=== Gates ===
For state ceremonies, the dignitaries would enter through the Kenreimon (建礼門), which has a cypress-wood roof, and is supported by four unpainted wooden pillars. This gate would have been used on the rare occasions of the Emperor welcoming a foreign diplomat or dignitary, as well as for many other important state ceremonies. Passing through the Kenreimon, the inner gate Jomeimon would appear, which is painted in vermilion and roofed in tile. This leads to the Shishin-den, which is the Hall for State Ceremonies. The Gekkamon is a smaller gate on the west side of the main courtyard.

The annual Aoi Matsuri in May is the procession of the Saiō-Dai, historically a priestess of the imperial house, to the Shimogamo Shrine and Kamigamo Shrine. The procession departs in front of the Kenreimon.

Another gate in the outer courtyard is the Kenshunmon, which has a similar architectural style to the Kenreimon. Located next to the Kenshunmon is a square where the traditional ball game Kemari is played.

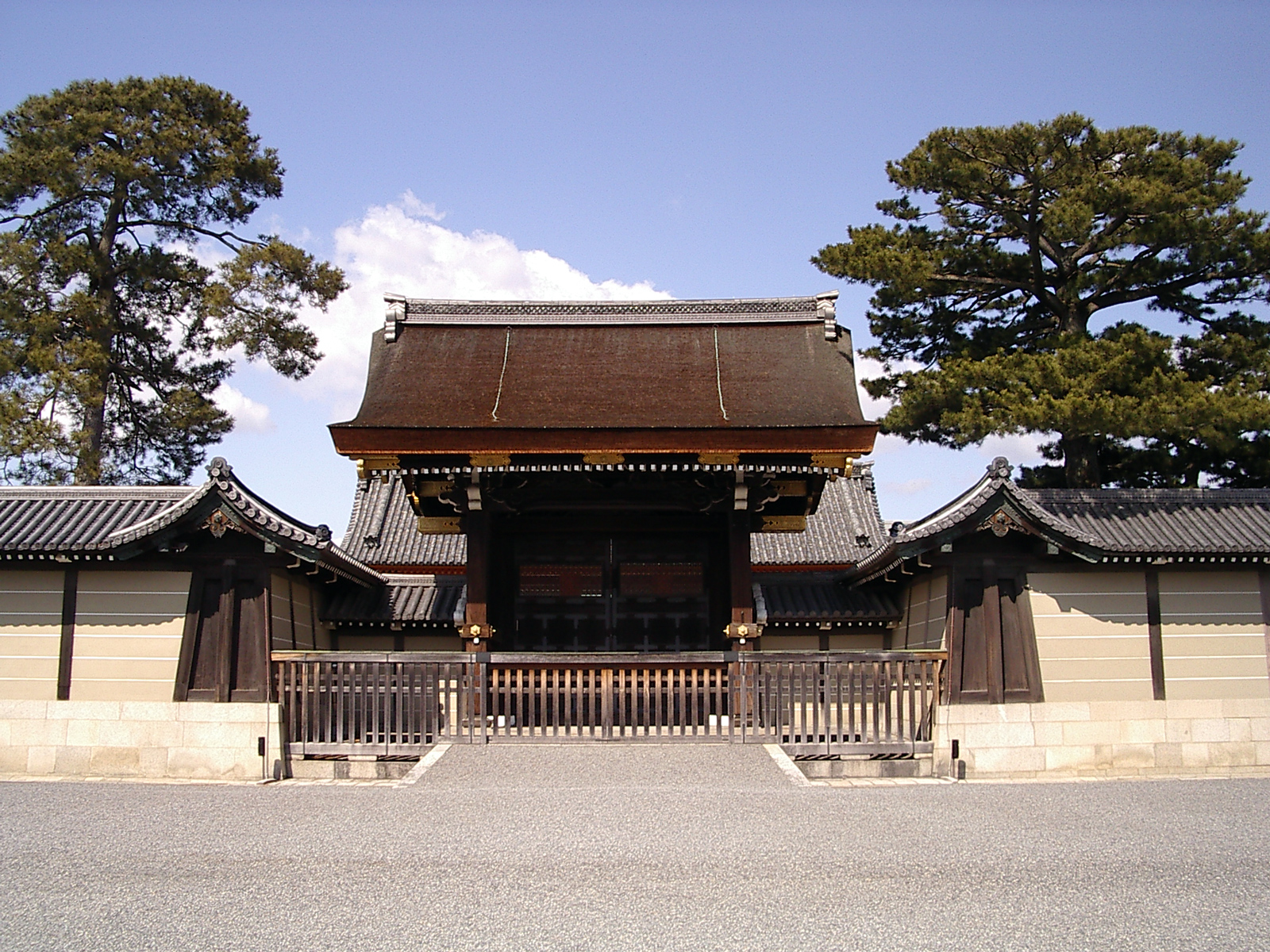
Kenreimon (建礼門), the main entrance gates used by emperor only.

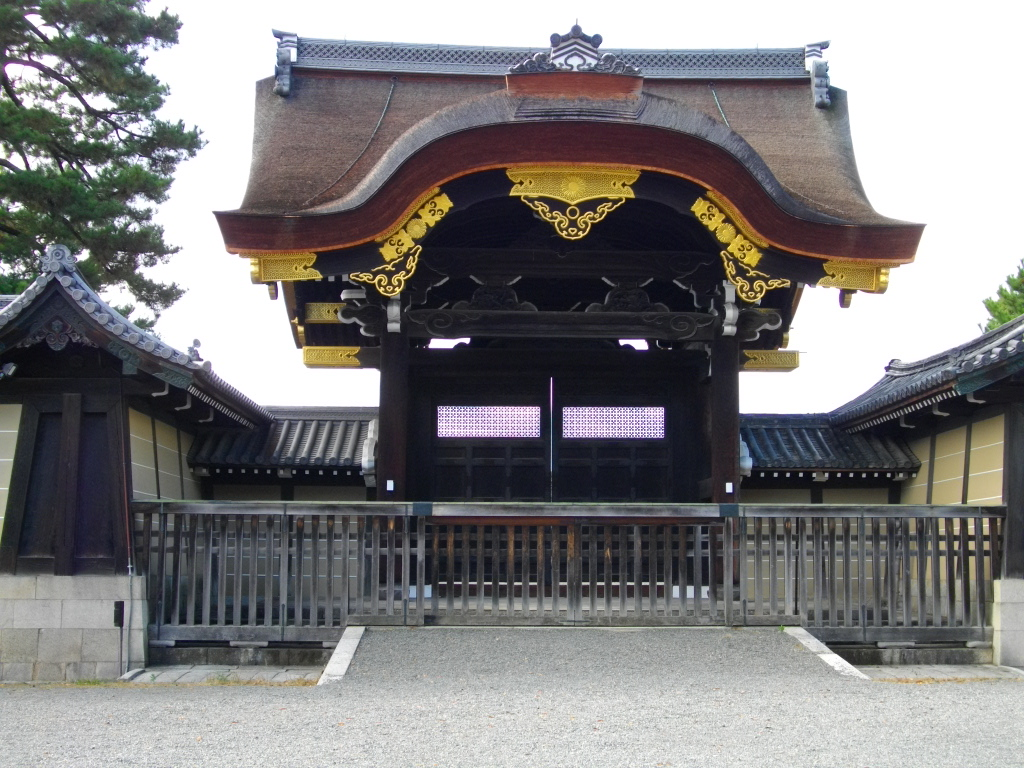
Kenshunmon (建春門) Eastern gate.

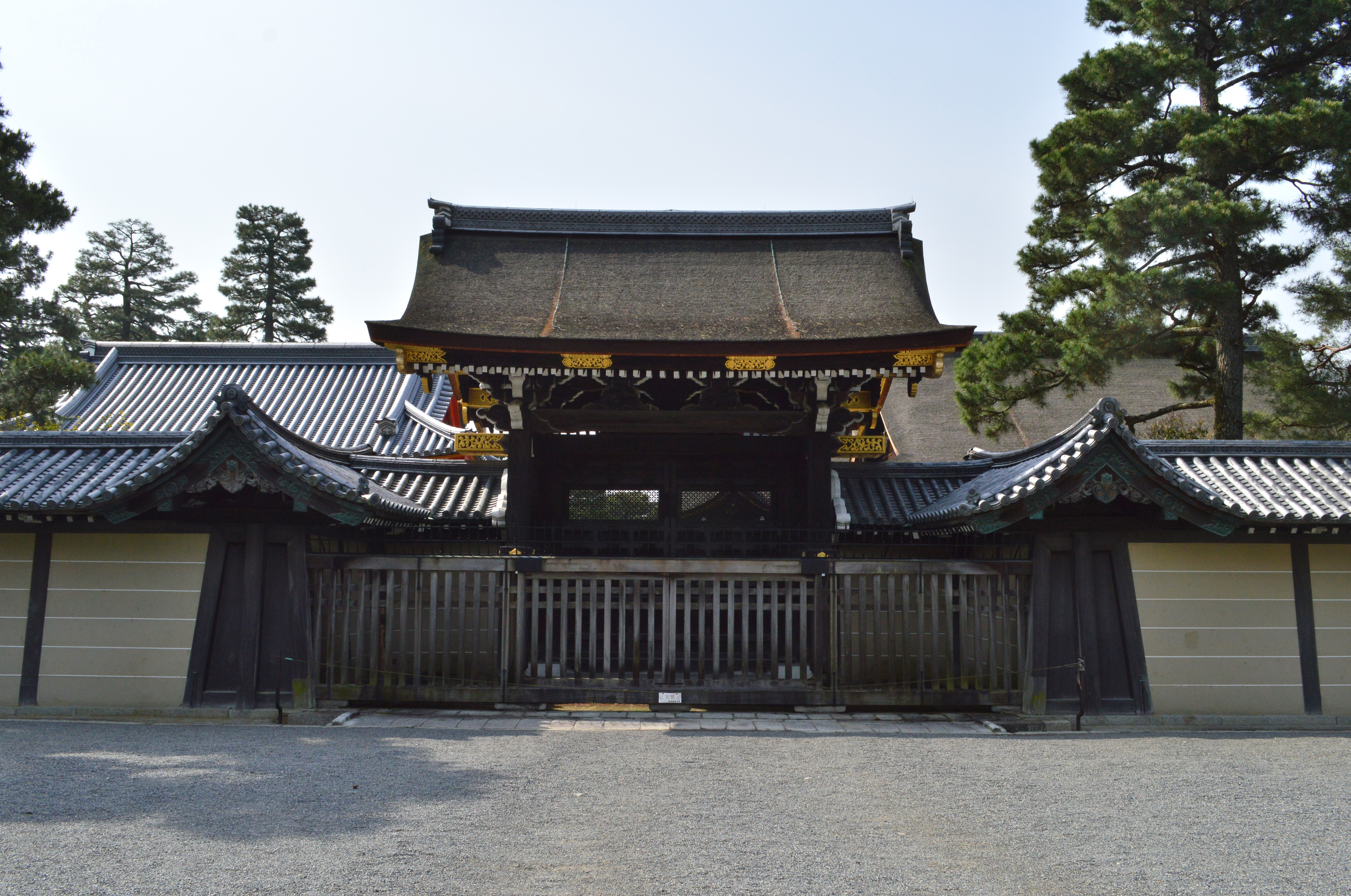
Sakuheimon (朔平門), Northern gate.

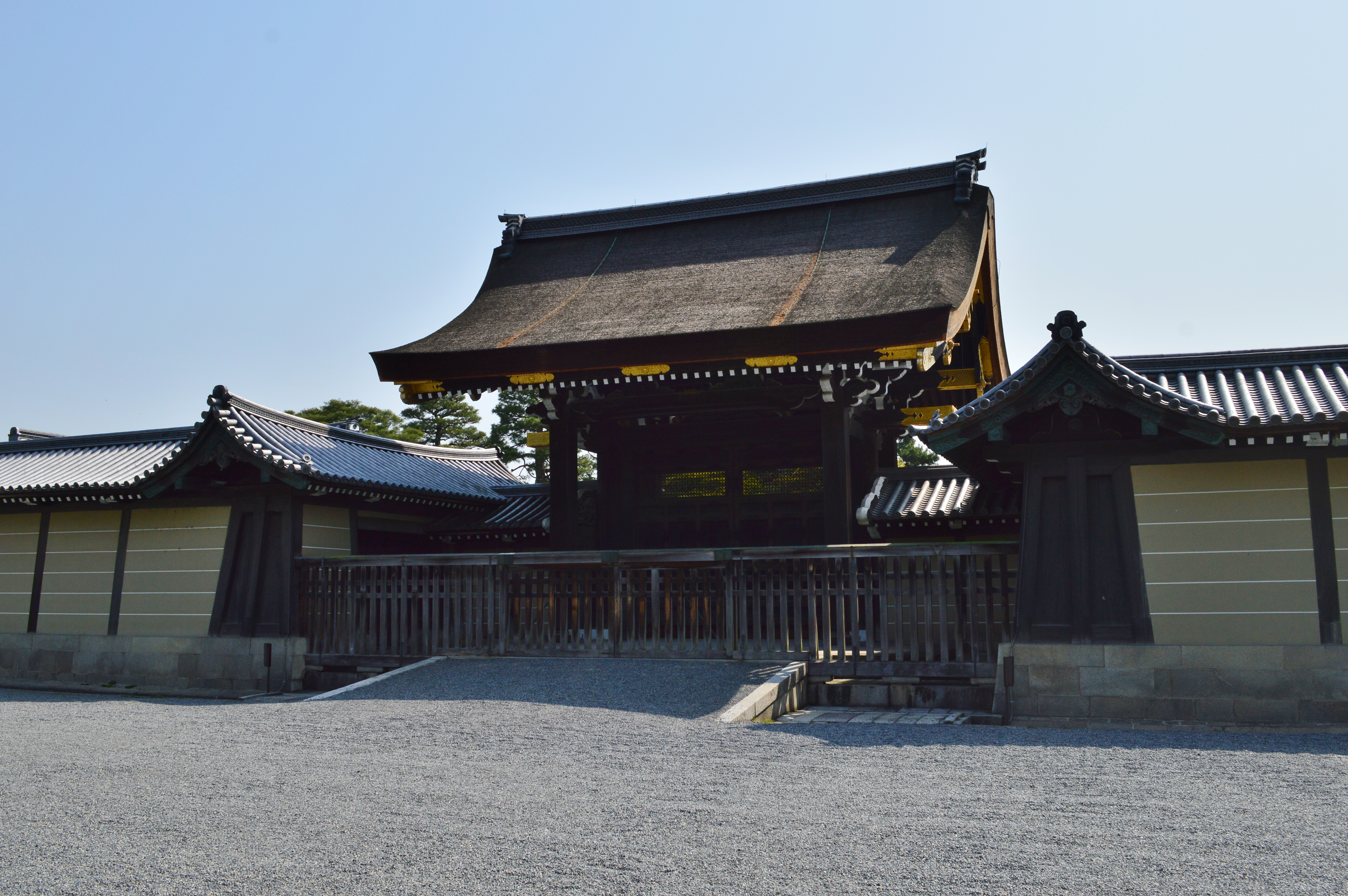
Gishumon (宜秋門), Lower Western gate used by the Emperor Emeritus, Imperial family members, and highest-ranking court nobles, who officially visited to the palace.

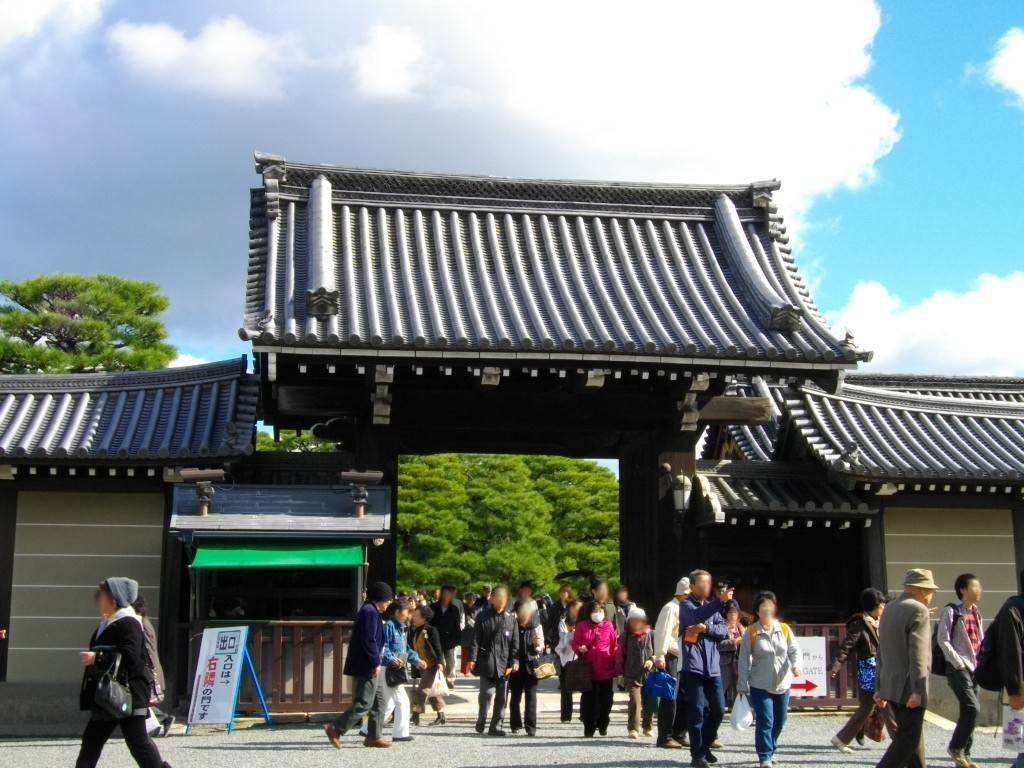
Seishomon (清所門), Middle Western gate.

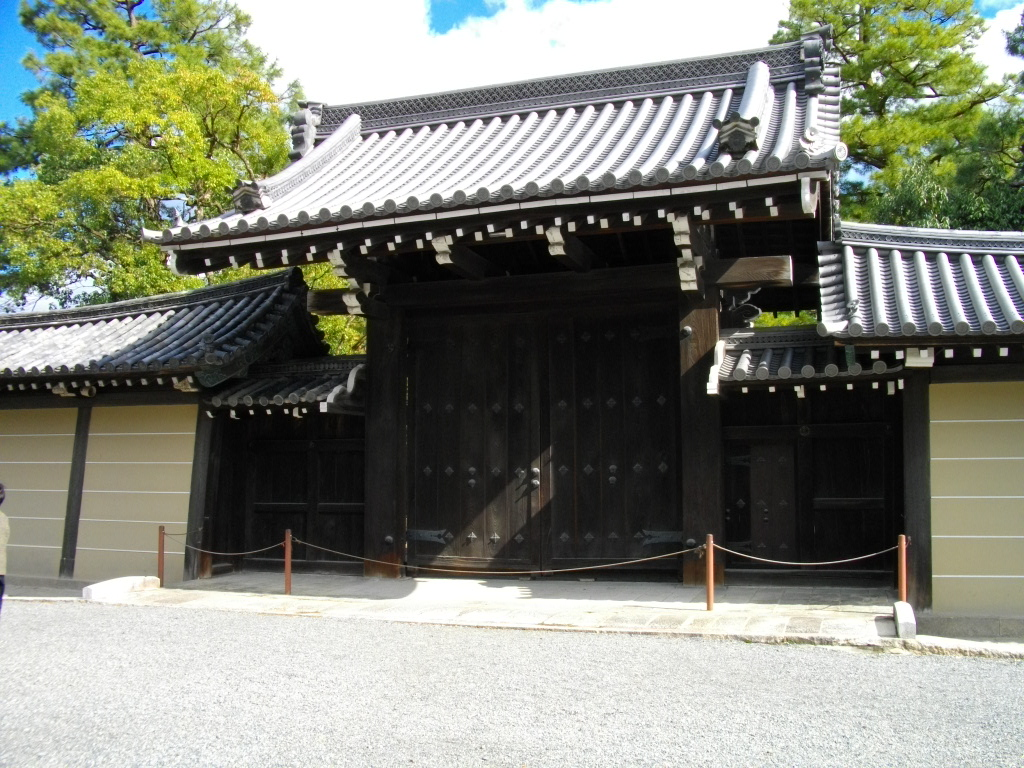
Kogo-Mon (皇后門), Upper Western gate, used by Empress.

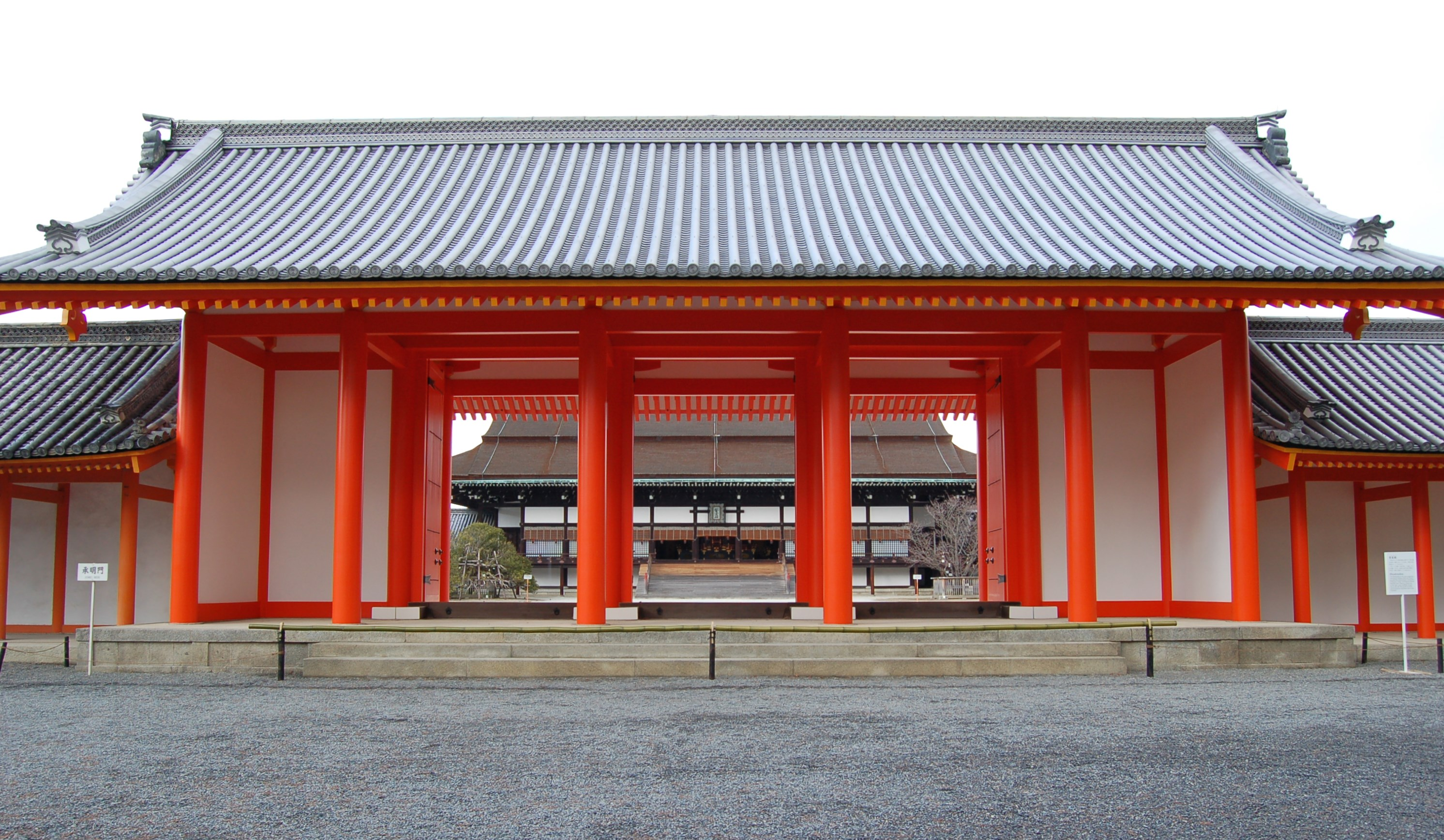
Jomeimon (承明門), Main entrance to Shishiden throne hall

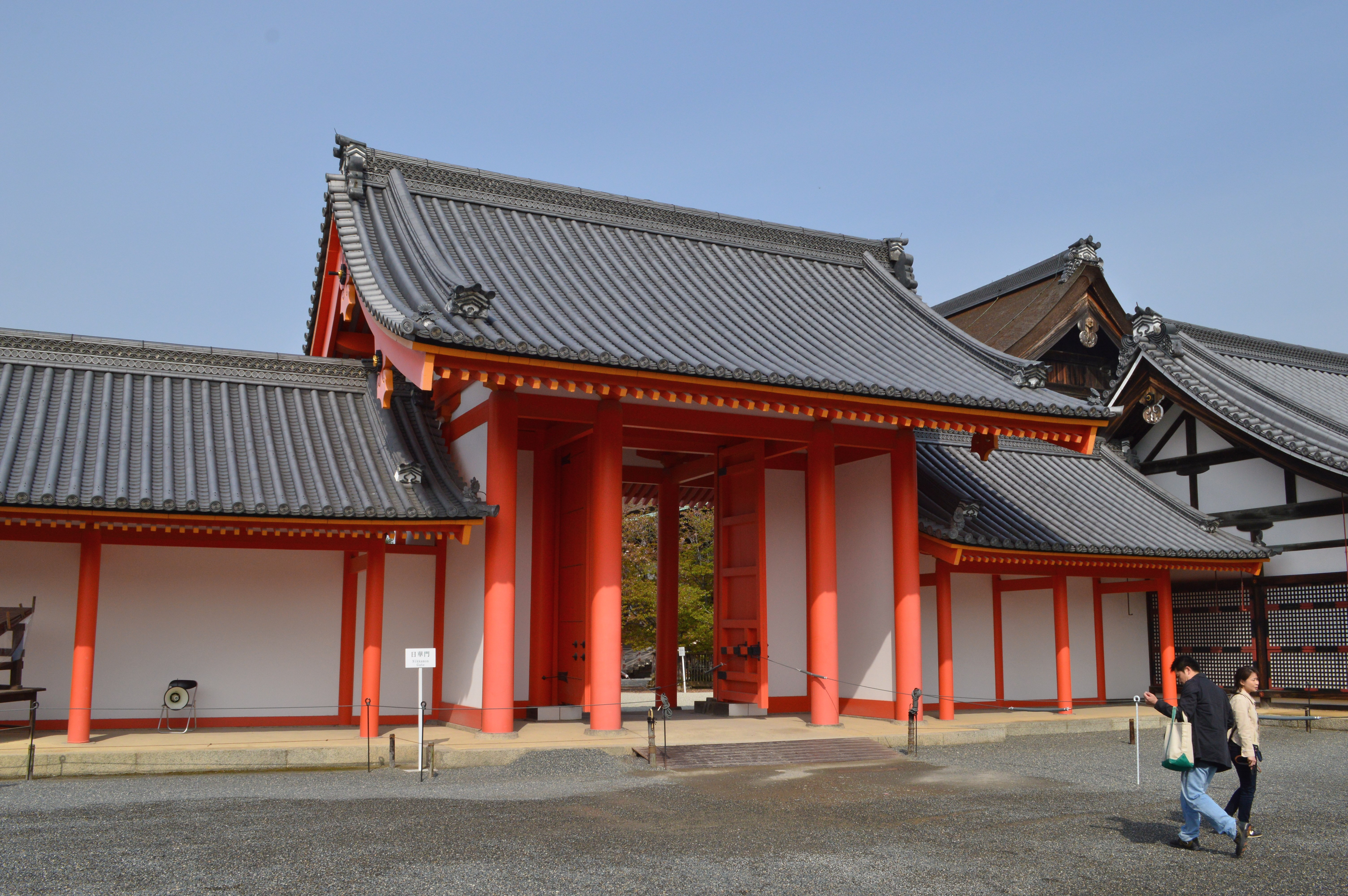
Nikkamon (日華門), Eastern gate to Shishiden throne hall

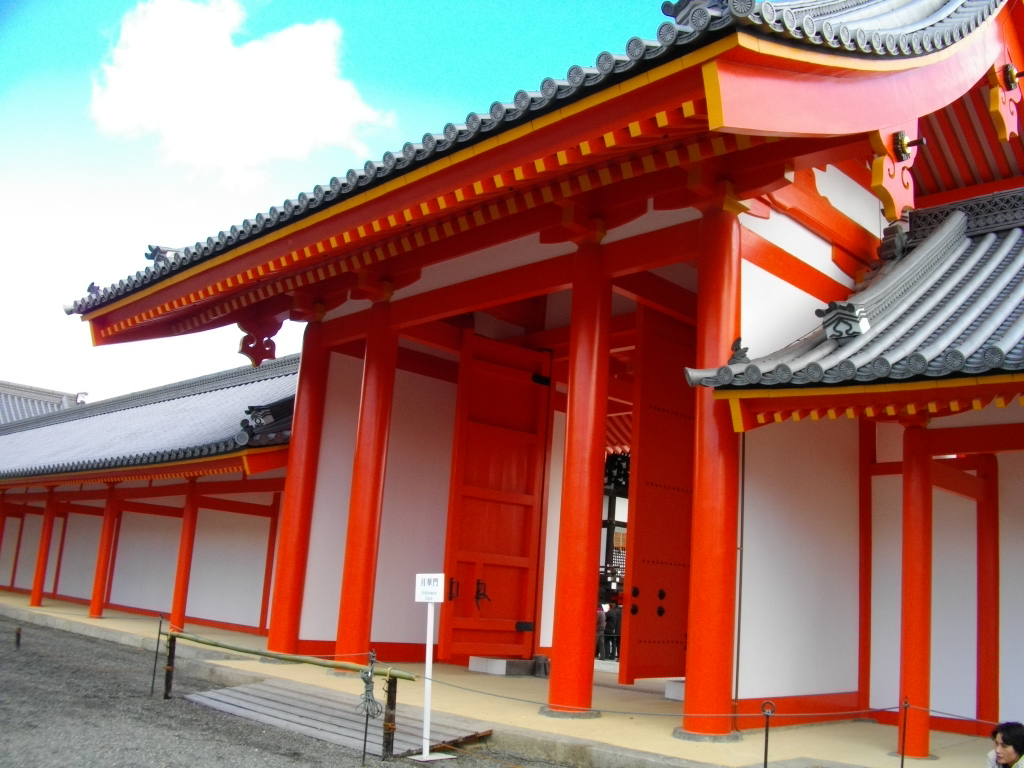
Gekka-Mon (月華門), Western gate to Shishiden throne hall

=== Okurumayose ===
Okurumayose (御車寄) was also called as Kugemon (公家門), which refers to "the gate for highest-ranking court nobles". It was designed with Karahafu style (curved gable) roof. The Okurumayose served as the official entrance for high-ranking court nobles, which is derived from the entrance created in the middle of the corridor in aristocratic residences during the Heian period. The Okurumayose is created in the middle of a long north-south corridor. Heading north leads to the office of retainers and the other buildings located further north of the Kogosho, while heading south leads to the rooms of the Shodaibu-no-ma and the Seiryoden.

The use of the Okurumayose was exclusively reserved for the highest-ranking court nobles. Furthermore, among them, only a select few were permitted to bring their vehicles directly to this entrance. Others had to enter the palace building from the Shodaibu-no-ma, located south of the Okurumayose. When entering the Okurumayose with a palanquin or other vehicle, it was customary to get into a palanquin from the front and get out from the rear.

In the late Edo period, the shogun's visit to Kyoto occurred for the first time in about 230 years. In 1863 (Bunkyū 3), the Shogun Tokugawa Iemochi got out of his palanquin outside the Gishumon Gate and walked on foot to the Okurumayose to enter the palace. The following year, during his second visit, his treatment was improved, and he was permitted to ride his palanquin directly to the Okurumayose to enter the palace.

=== Shodaibunoma ===
The Shodaibunoma (諸大夫の間) building was used as a waiting room for dignitaries on their official visits to the palace. They were ushered into three different anterooms according to their ranks. There are 3 rooms in rank from the highest to lowest that are the Tora-no-ma (Tiger Room), Tsuru-no-ma (Crane Room), and Sakura-no-ma (Cherry Blossom Room). Each room was reserved for nobles of certain ranks: Kugyo (the highest-ranked court nobles), Denjo-bito (court nobles ranked below Kugyo, especially those permitted to ascend to the Emperor's living quarters), and Shodaibu (court nobles ranked below Denjo-bito, who were not permitted to ascend to the Emperor's living quarters). The name Shodaibu-no-ma originally referred only to the Sakura-no-ma (Cherry Blossom Room).

Except for the highest-ranked nobles who were permitted to enter from the Okuruma-yose or Carriage Porch, visitors were required to enter from the kutsunugi-ishi (a stone slab for removing shoes) on the west side of the Shodaibu-no-ma, and then to wait in the designated room corresponding to their rank. Since ancient times, there had been a strict distinction between the Kugyo & Denjobito and the Shodaibu. This distinction can be seen from the fact that the Tora-no-ma and Tsuru-no-ma have tatami mats decorated with finely patterned korai-beri (korai-style tatami hems), and the ranma (transom) between these two rooms. However, the Sakura-no-ma has tatami mats decorated with red silk border hems and no ranma transoms. The Sakura-no-ma is also the only room with a wall on the north side, which means that visitors from the Sakura-no-ma were not permitted to use the corridor leading to the main palace buildings.

The Shodaibu-no-ma was also used to receive visits from samurai lords. The Tora-no-ma was used as an antechamber for samurai lords of the Kugyo rank (called Gosanke and Gosankyo), and the Tsuru-no-ma for lower-ranked samurai (for ex., messengers of the shogun, Kyoto Shoshidai (Kyoto Governor appointed by the shogunate), where guests could prepare for audiences with the Emperor in the Kogosho. It also served as meeting place for court nobles and samurai during the upheaval at the end of the Edo period.

The Shodaibu-no-ma was also used as a venue for annual ceremonies. When the Chugen Festival, which occurred at the same time as the Urabon-e (Bon Festival) on July 14 and 15, lanterns presented by the Empress, ladies-in-waiting, and court nobles, were displayed in the rooms and corridors. These lanterns were elaborately decorated with dolls and artificial flowers, and were lit at night for the Emperor to view, while the general public was also permitted to view them during the day.

Shodaibunoma

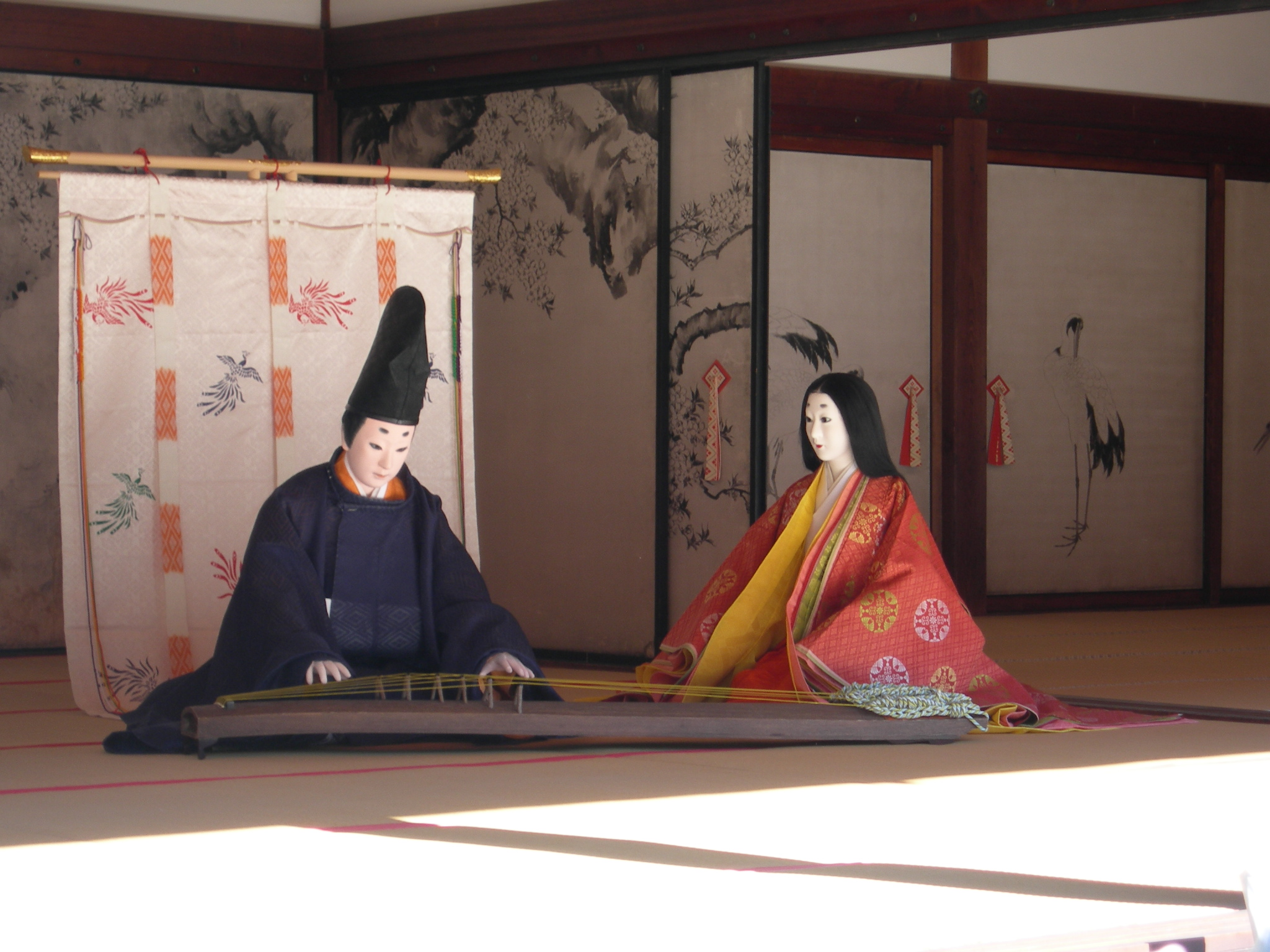
Dolls displayed in Cherry Blossom room.

=== Shinmikurumayose ===
The Shinmikurumayose (新御車寄) (New Carriage Porch) was built for the Enthronement Ceremony of Emperor Taisho in 1915 to welcome the carriage procession carrying the Emperor. The name is the collective name used to refer to the entire structure, including the interior. Initially on the north side there used to be a corridor leading to the Otsunegoten, but this was demolished during the World War II, and today it is a stand-alone building.

In ancient times, on the occasion of a visit by the Emperor, it was the tradition that the Emperor would get in the Imperial palanquin in the Shishinden building. And the Imperial Palanguin would enter and exit through the Kenreimon Gate on the south side of the palace grounds. Following the tradition, the Shin-mikurumayose was also built facing south.

The Shin-mikurumayose was built to the west of the Shishinden as an entrance porch for Imperial visits in the modern era. This is because the Jomeimon Gate, located between the Shishinden and the Kenreimon Gate, was designed to fit the width of the Imperial palanquin, making it impossible for the newly introduced horse-drawn carriages to pass through.

The Okurumayose (conventional porch for the highest-ranking court nobles) was designed for either their vehicles or for them to enter on foot from the front. Therefore, the Okurumayose is characterized by walls on both sides. In contrast, the new Shin-mikurumayose allows vehicles to enter from the west side. This design enables carriages to align their side doors with the front of the building for boarding, alighting, and passing through towards the east. To ensure the passing route of the carriage, there are no walls on either side. While both the conventional Okurumayose and the new Shin-mikurumayose share the same karahafu (curved gable) roof style, there are, as mentioned above, structural differences based on their usage.

The interior of the Shin-mikurumayose consists of a hallway at the entrance and four rooms of varying sizes, with frosted glass and Western-style lighting, and carpeted floors to accommodate people with shoes entering the palace, making it compatible with modern living styles. It was used as a reception room for foreign envoyes at the Enthronement Ceremonies of Emperor Taisho and Emperor Showa, and today it is still used as a venue for Their Majesties the Emperor and Empress to hold tea parties when in Kyoto.

=== Shunkōden ===
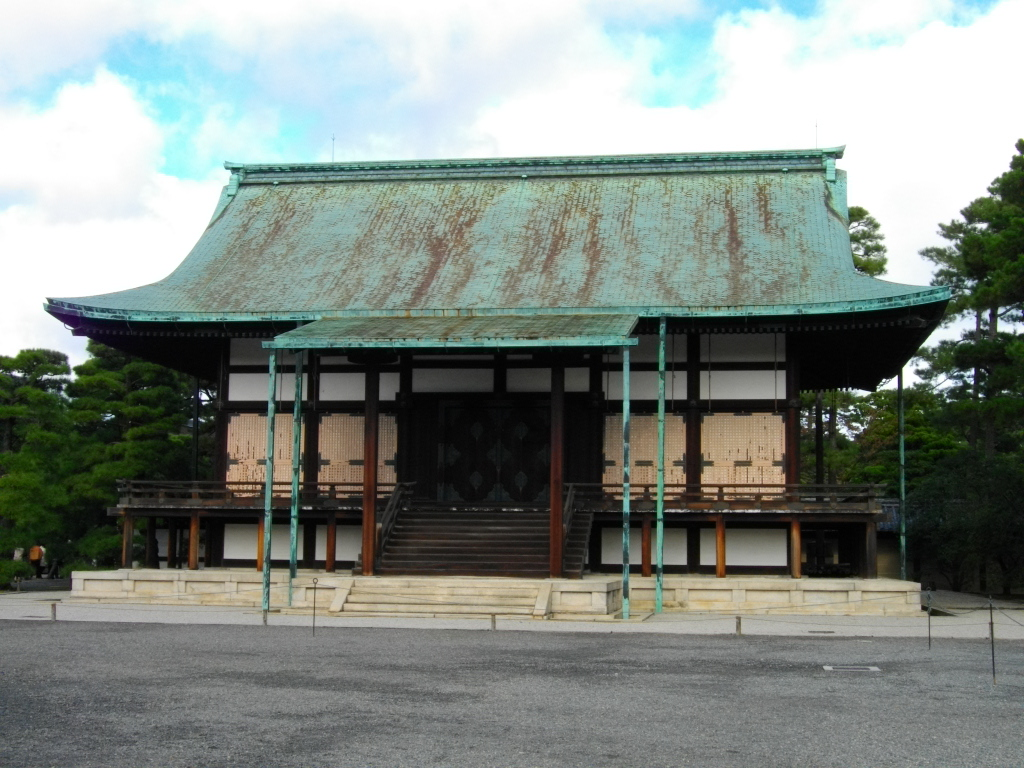
Shunkōden

The Shunkōden (春興殿) was constructed in 1915 for the Enthronement Ceremony of Emperor Taisho to house the Divine Mirror, one of the Three Imperial Regalia. The mirror had been brought from the Kashikodokoro Sanctuary at the Imperial Palace in Tokyo. Imperial succession ceremonies, such as the Kashikodokoro-oomae-no-gi, the ceremony to announce the accession to the throne to the Imperial ancestors, were held here. The roof is modern, being made out of copper and not wooden shingles.

=== Shishinden ===
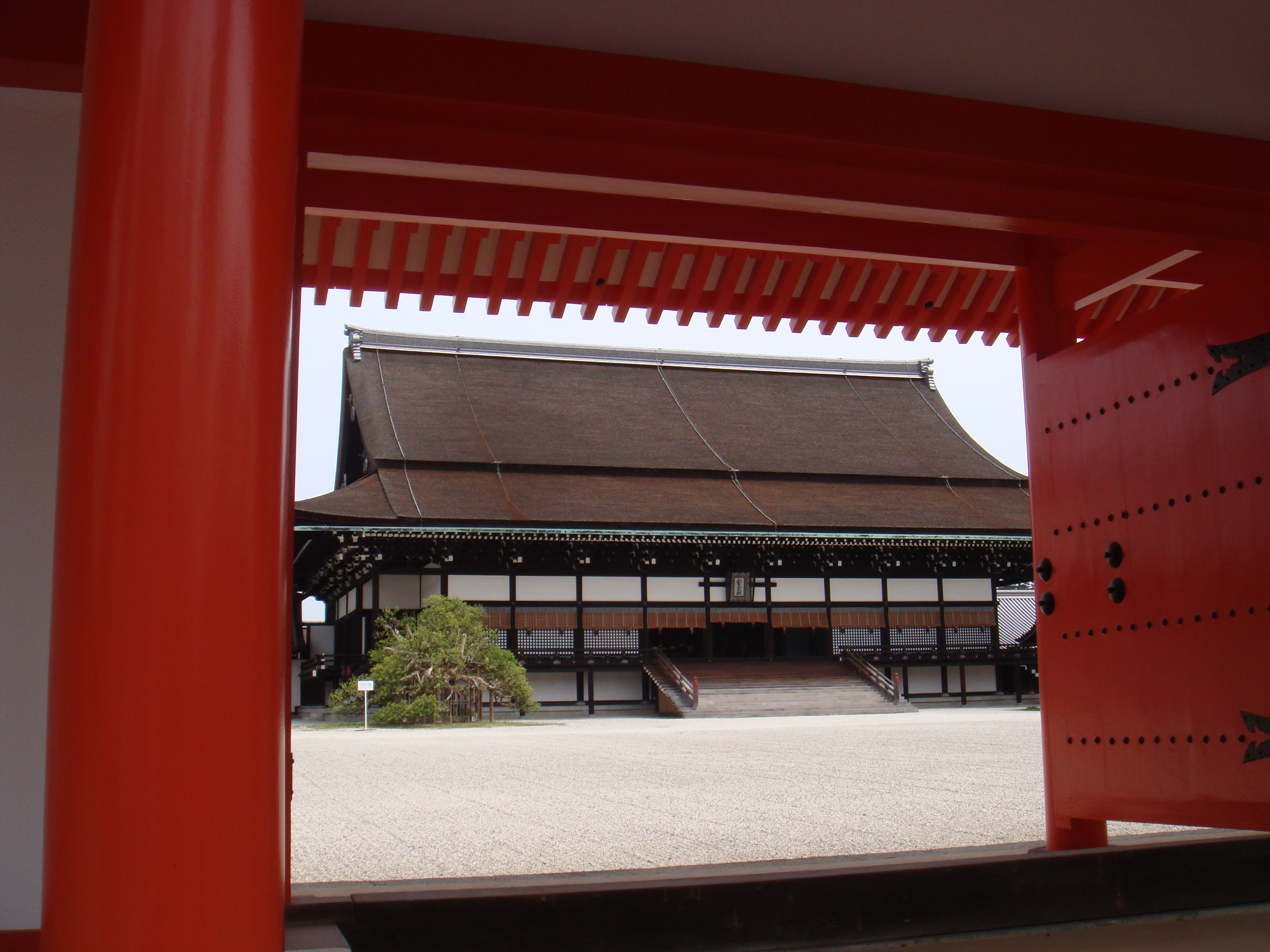
View through the Jomeimon on Shishinden main hall

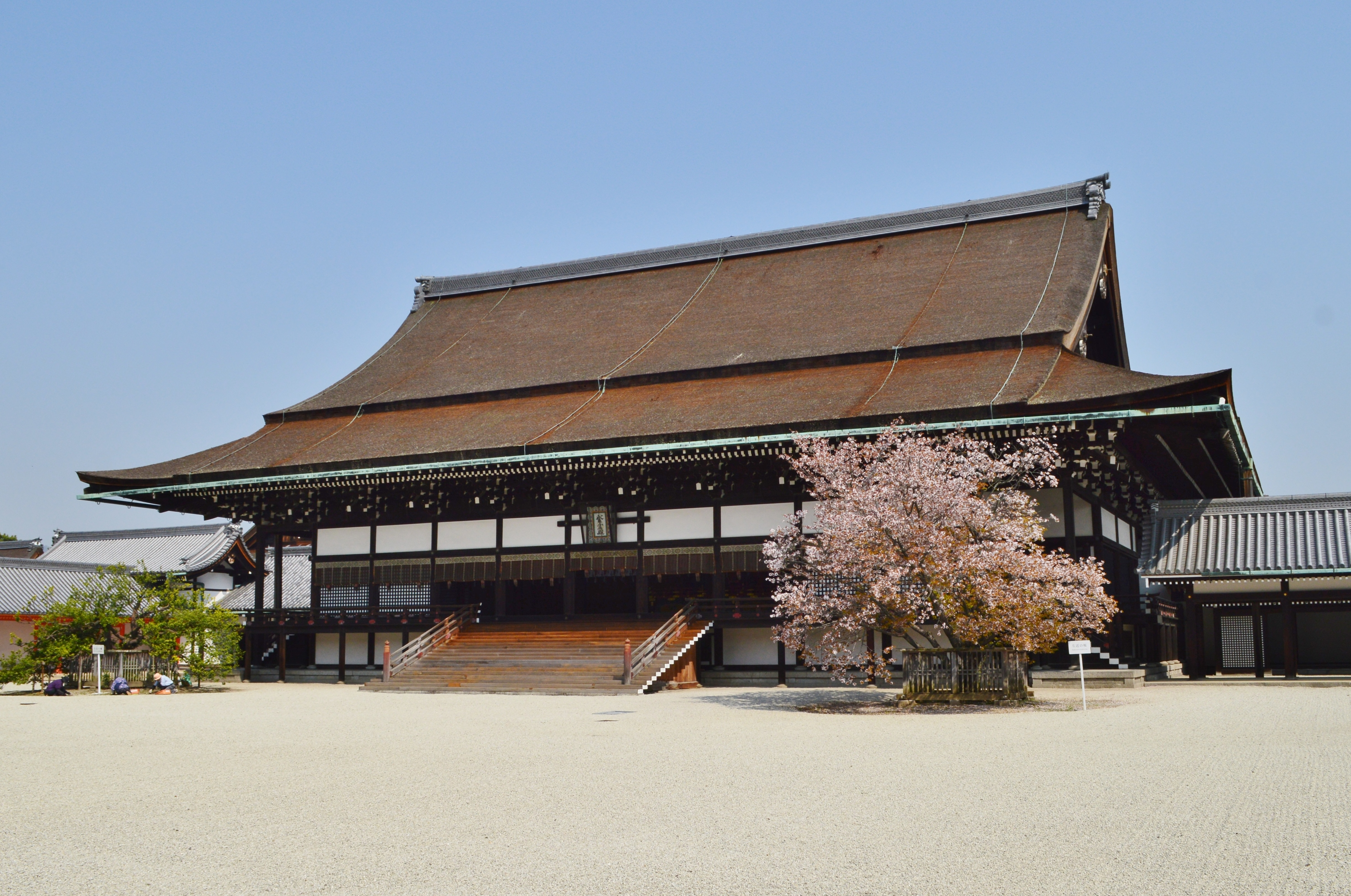
Shishinden throne hall.

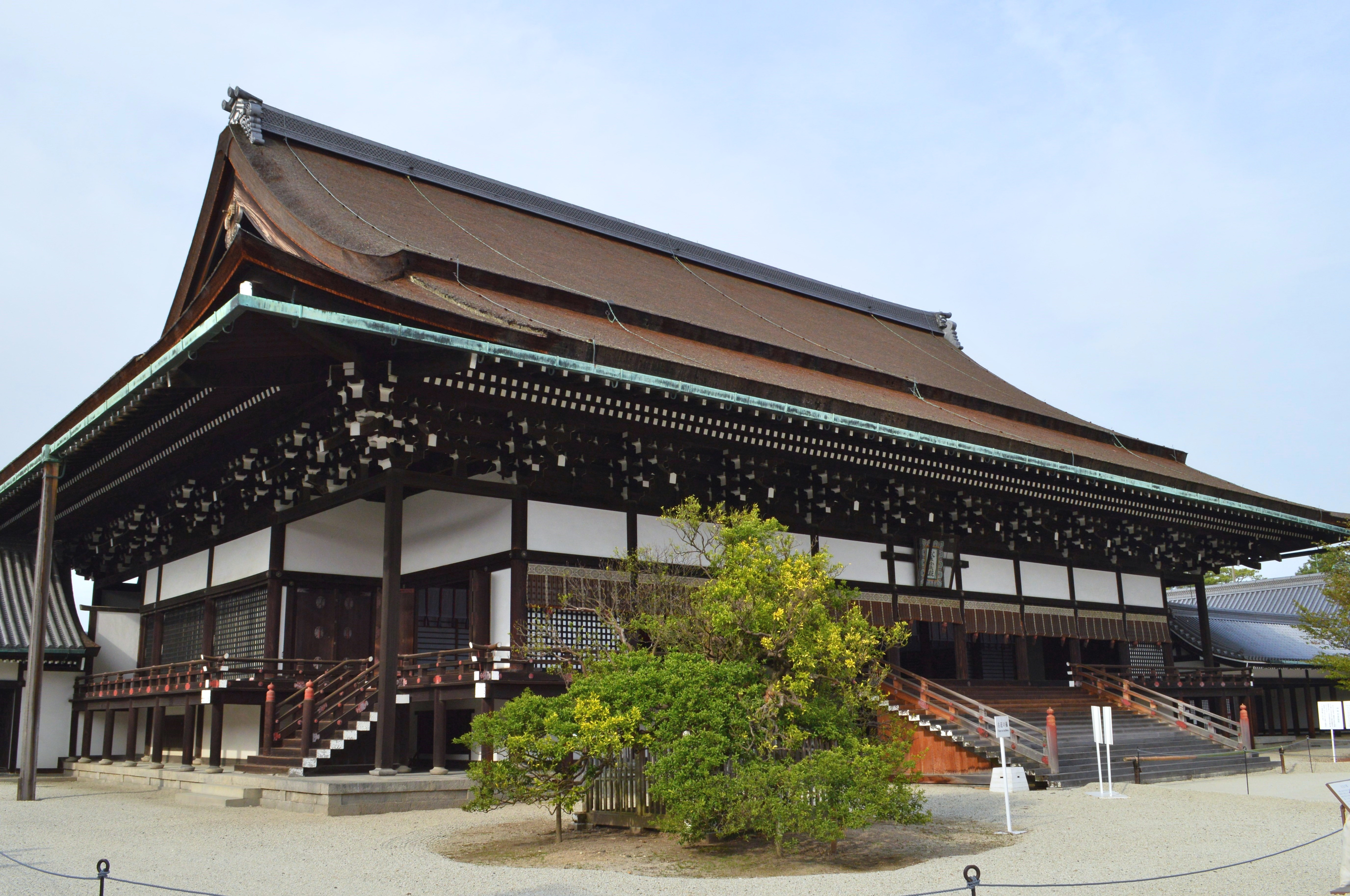
Shishinden throne hall.

The Shishinden (紫宸殿) is the most important ceremonial building within the palace grounds. The enthronement ceremonies of Emperors Meiji through Showa took place here. The hall is 33 by 23 metres (108 by 75 ft) in size, and features a traditional architectural style, with a gabled and hipped roof called Shinden-zukuri. On either side of its main stairway were planted trees which would become very famous and sacred, a cherry (sakura) on the eastern, left side, and a tachibana orange tree on the right to the west. The garden of white gravel played an important role in the ceremony. The Shishinden is the main hall with a distinguished history dating back to the Heian period, where important court ceremonies were held. It was built facing south in the southern area of the grounds and was also known as Nantei (南庭). The building, with its cypress bark roof and natural, unpainted wood construction, features Shitomido outer doors and Karado doors on the exterior. The central area, called Moya (母屋), measures 9 ken (approximately 16.4 meters) in width and 3 ken (approximately 5.5 meters) in length, and is surrounded by Hisashi on all four sides. The interior showcases Keshoyaneura (refined rafters and beams) and Nugui-itajiki (refined polished wood flooring). All these features highlight the architectural styles of the Heian period.

Currently, the Shishinden houses the Takamikura (Imperial Throne) and the Michodai(August Seat of the Empress), which are used exclusively for the Enthronement Ceremony. Originally, the Michodai referred to an Emperor's throne within a rectangular canopy, like the one currently in the Seiryoden. The combination of the Emperor's throne in the canopy and the Kensho shoji (賢聖障子) panels located behind it characterized the Shishinden as a highly dignified and traditional building. During reconstruction in Kansei 2(1790), the architectural space of the Shishinden was restored according to the ancient Heian period traditions (Shinden-zukuri) to ensure that traditional ceremonies could be accommodated as originally intended. The restoration was based on the floor plan research by the scholar Uramatsu Kozen (as documented in "Daidaizu-koshō") and other documents related the Heian period Imperial Palace. While maintaining the Heian period style, modern techniques from the Edo period were used in some areas, such as the roof truss structure.

In the Shishinden, important ceremonies such as the Enthronement Ceremony, the Coming of Age Day, the Rikkou and the Rittaisi (Ceremonies for announcing that an Empress or new Crown Prince has been crowned and enthroned) and seasonal ceremonies were held. Not only the main hall but also the south garden in front of it, the surrounding corridors, and various gates were used as part of the ceremonial venue. In the South Garden, the Daijosai (Rite of Offering of New Rice after the Enthronement Ceremony) was also conducted. Originally, the Enthronement Ceremony was held in the Daigokuden of the Chodoin in the Heian palace, and the Daijosai in the south courtyard. In later periods, the Shishinden and the South Garden served as substitutes in place of the Chodoin. The corridors and gates built after the Kansei era reconstruction based on the style of the Chodoin.

The Shishinden, which preserves the tradition from the Heian period, became the stage for the dawn of a new era with the Meiji Restoration. It was the site for the proclamation of the Charter Oath (Five-Article Oath) in 1868 and served as a venue for Imperial audiences with foreign envoys. Subsequently, it was used for the Enthronement Ceremonies of Emperor Taishō and Emperor Shōwa, symbolizing the enduring court culture of Japan.

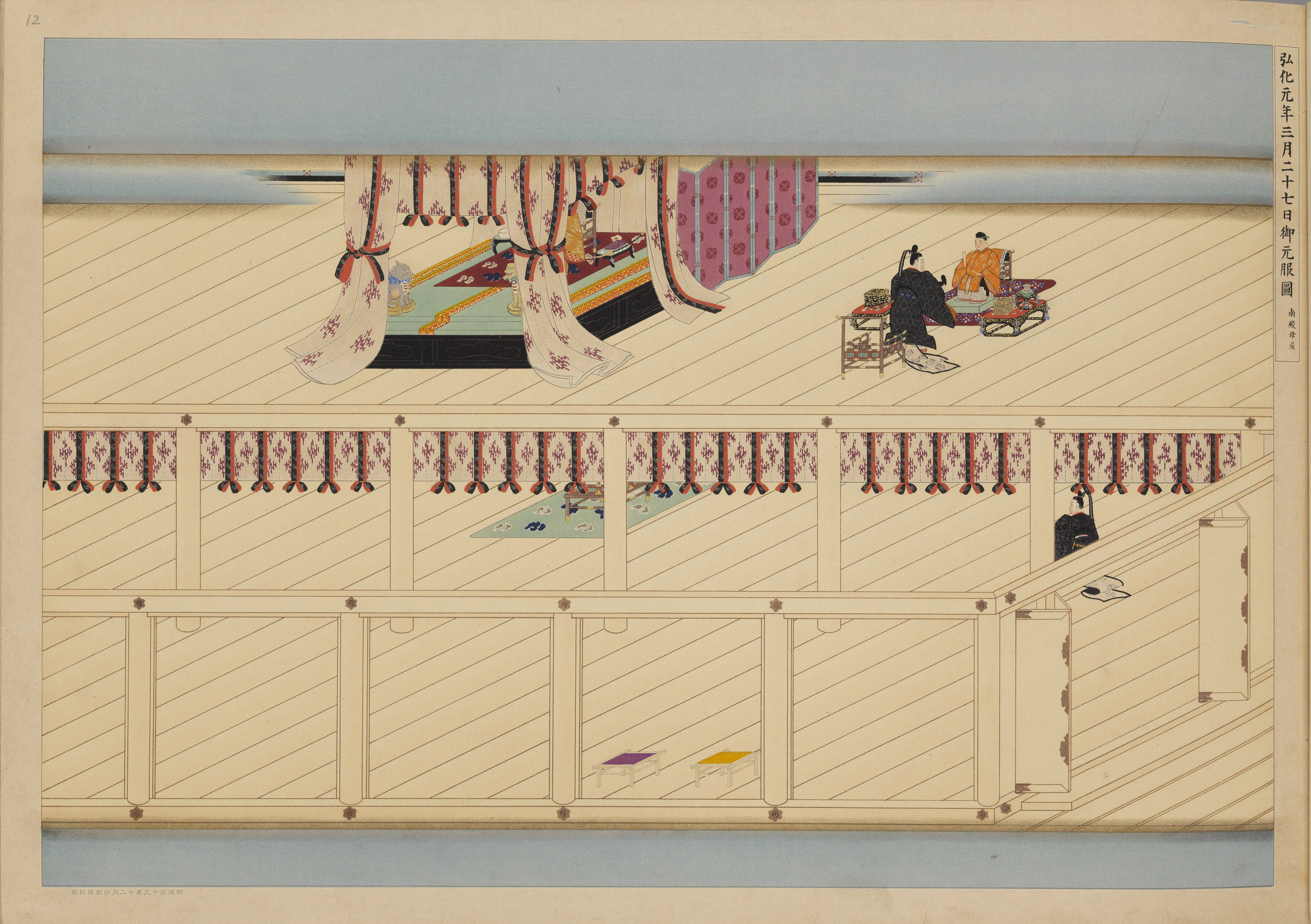
Genpuku (元服) ceremony of crown prince Osahito (right) at the Shishinden, Emperor Ninkō on throne (left) in 1st year of Kōka (1845).

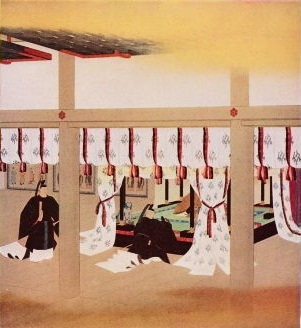
Genpuku (元服) ceremony of emperor Meiji in 8 February 1868.

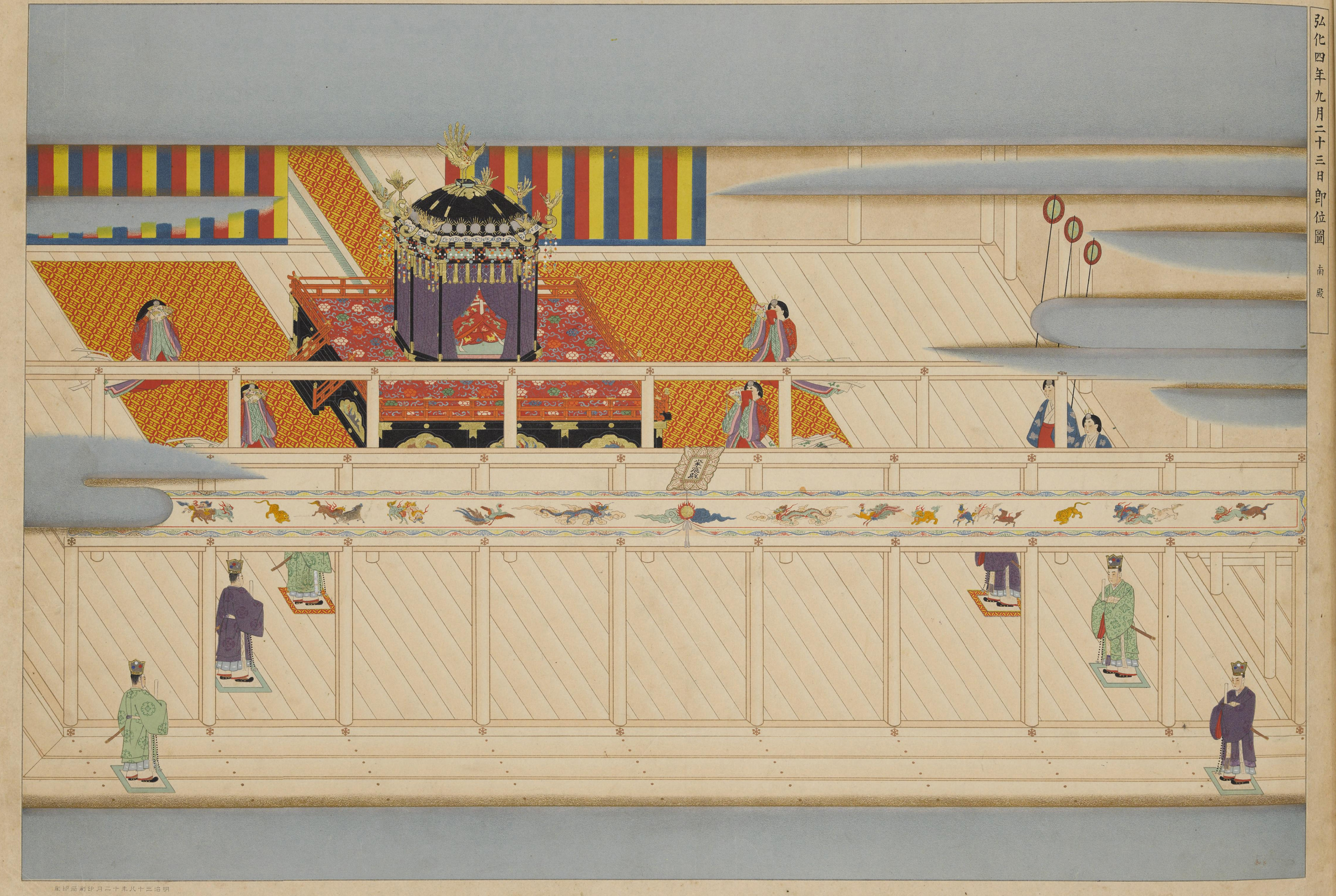
Enthronement ceremony of Emperor Kōmei at Shishinden.

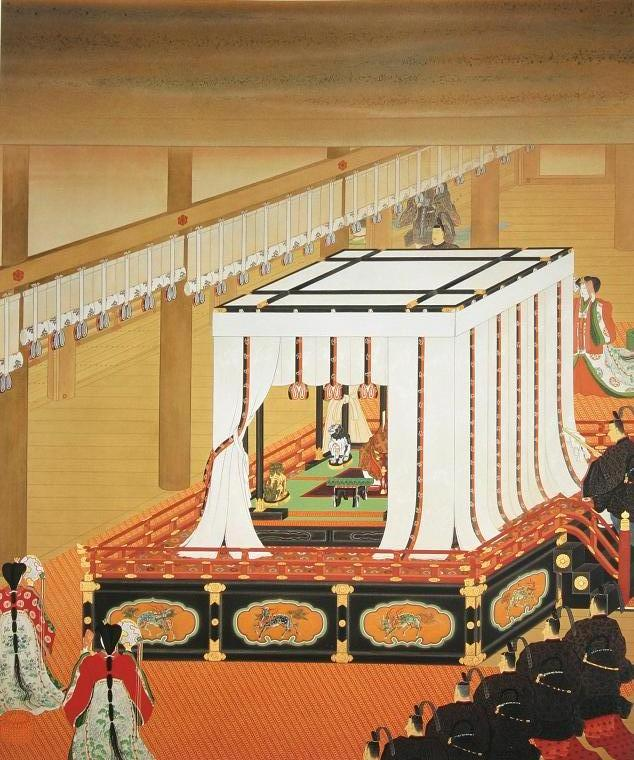
Enthronement ceremony of Emperor Meiji.

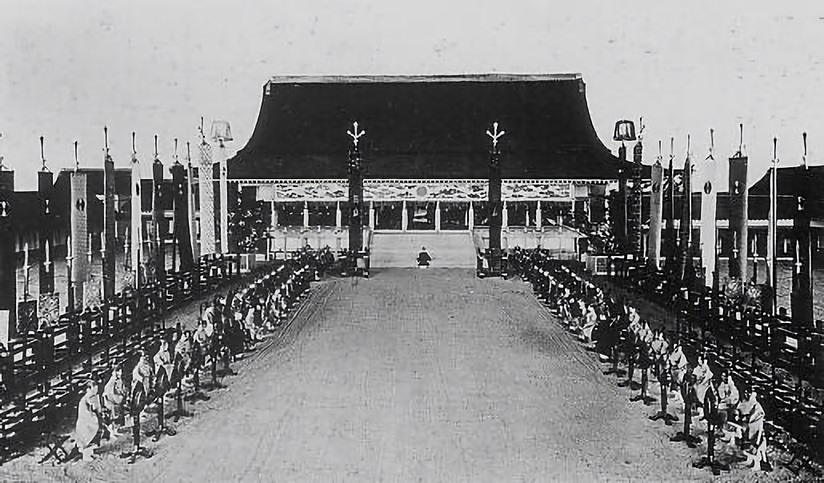
Enthronement of Emperor Taishō in 1915.

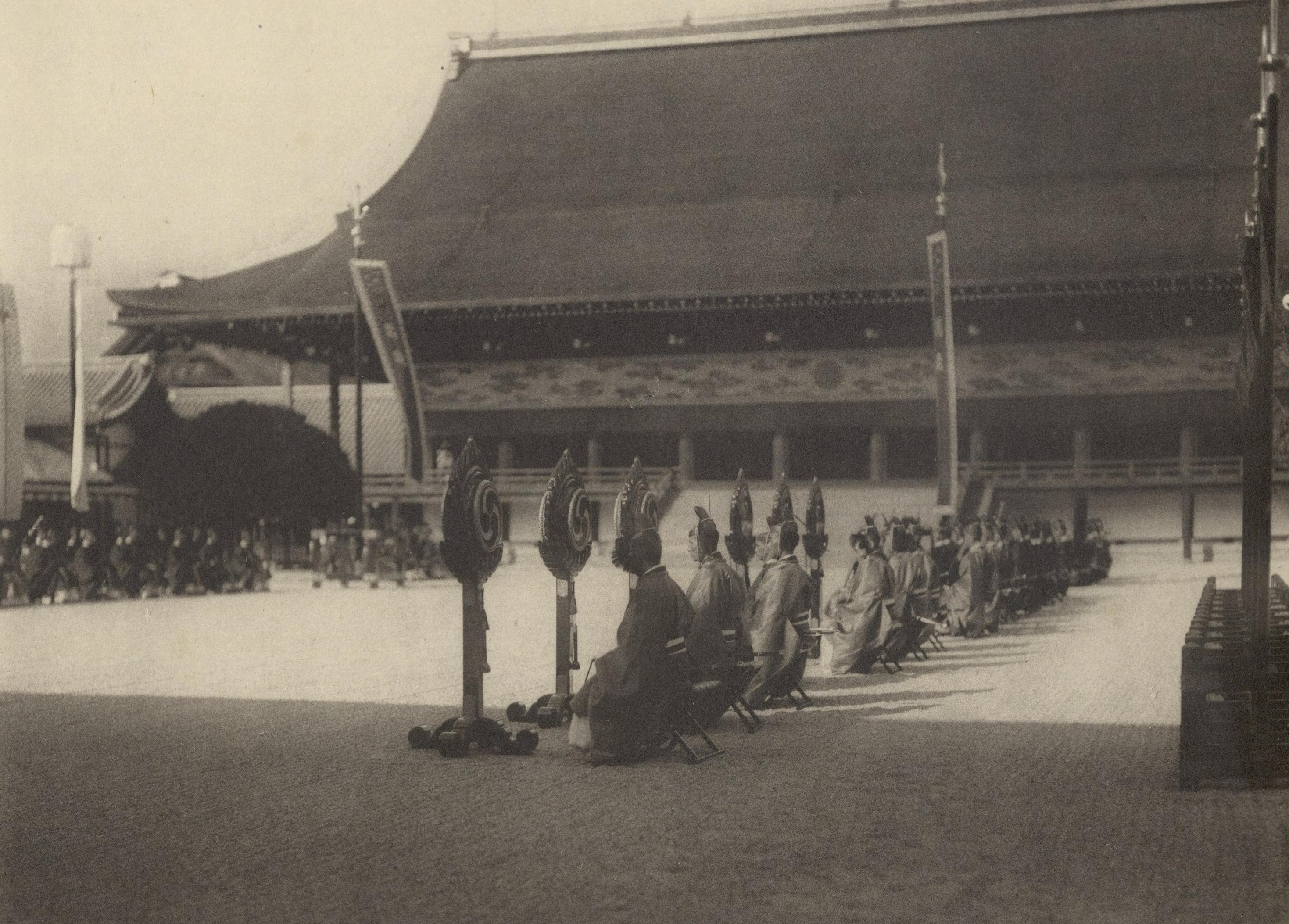
Ceremony of the Enthronement of Emperor Shōwa in Shishinden Hall.

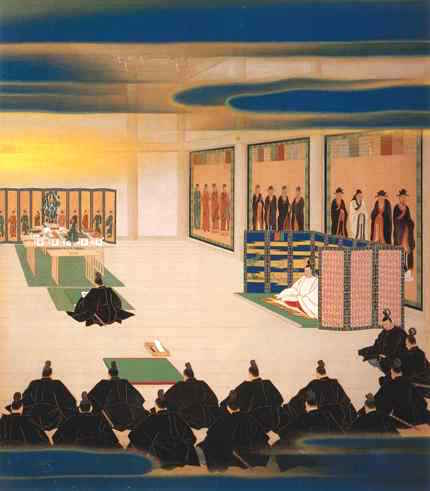
Proclamation of the Imperial Charter Oath

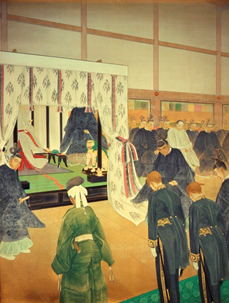
Emperor Meiji received Dirk de Graeff van Polsbroek Dutch foreign ministers.

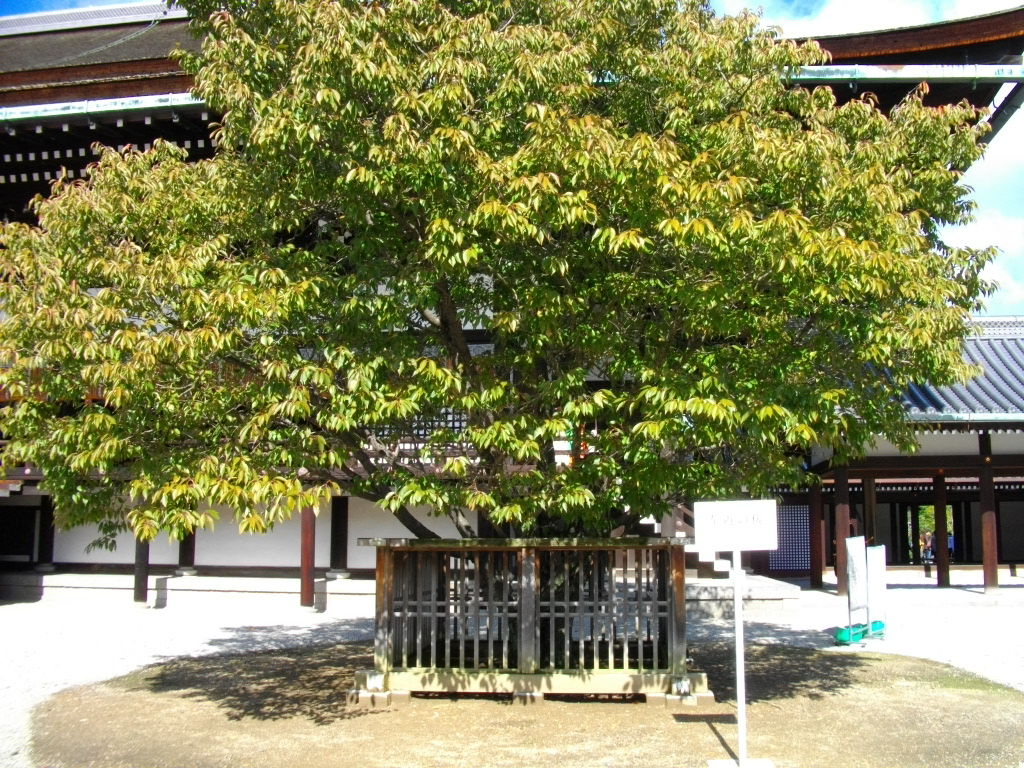
Sakon no Sakura, Cherry blossom tree on the right side.

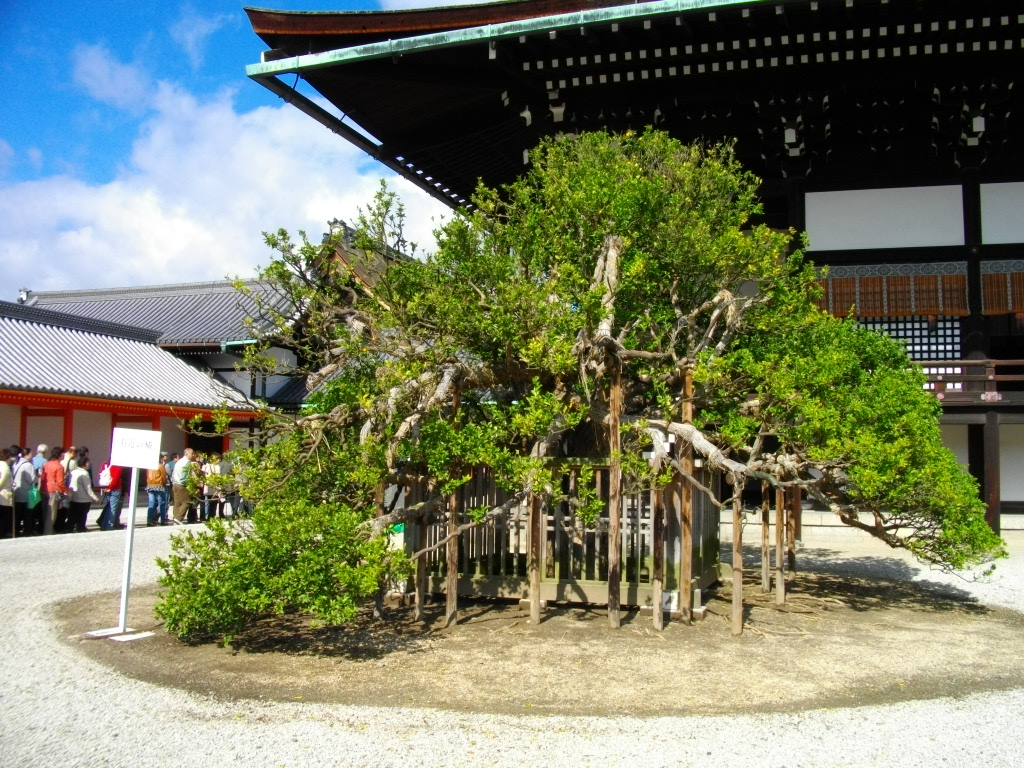
Ukon no Tachibana, Mandarin orange tree on the left side .

==== Takamikura ====
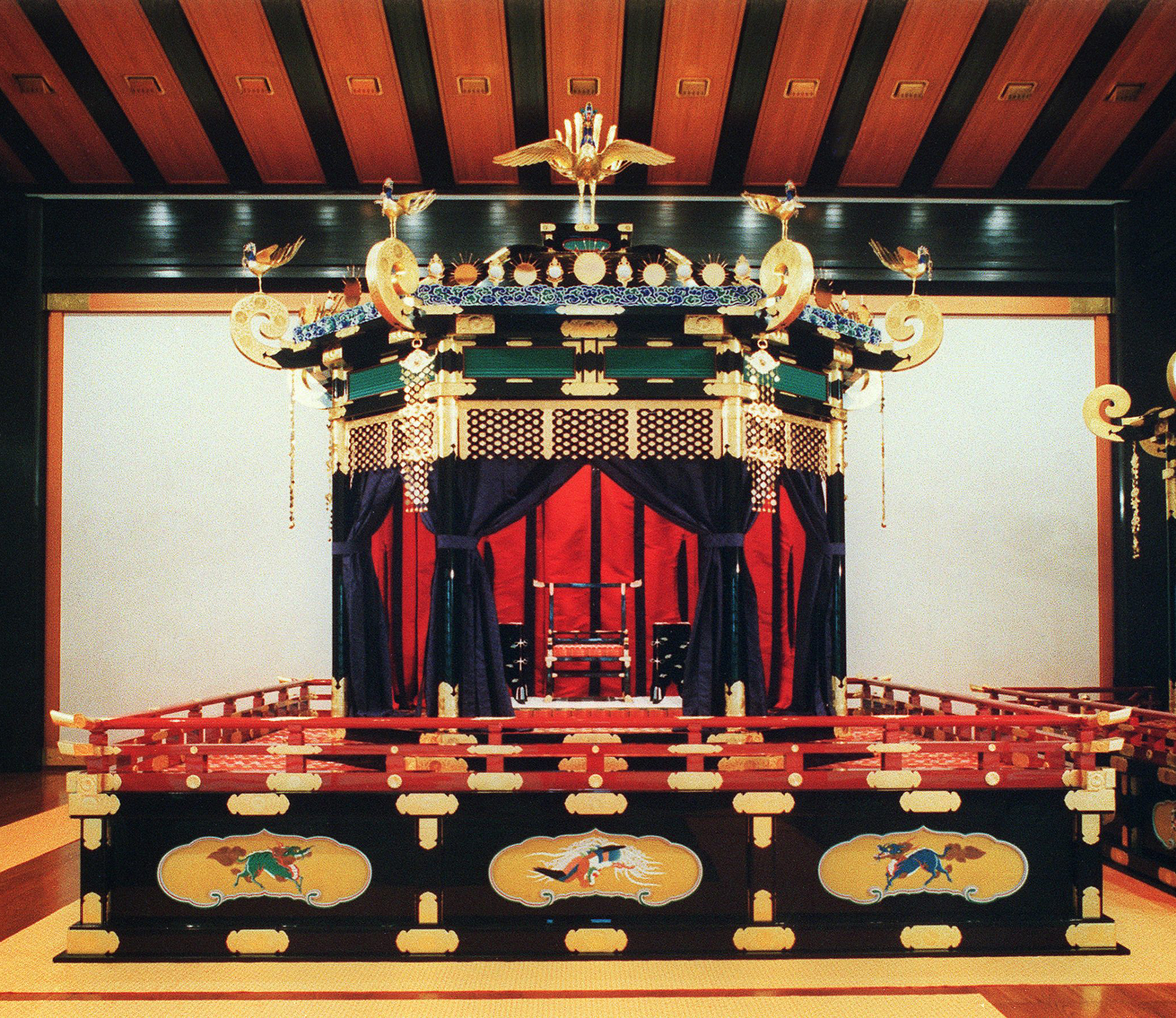
Takamikura throne used in enthronement ceremonies.

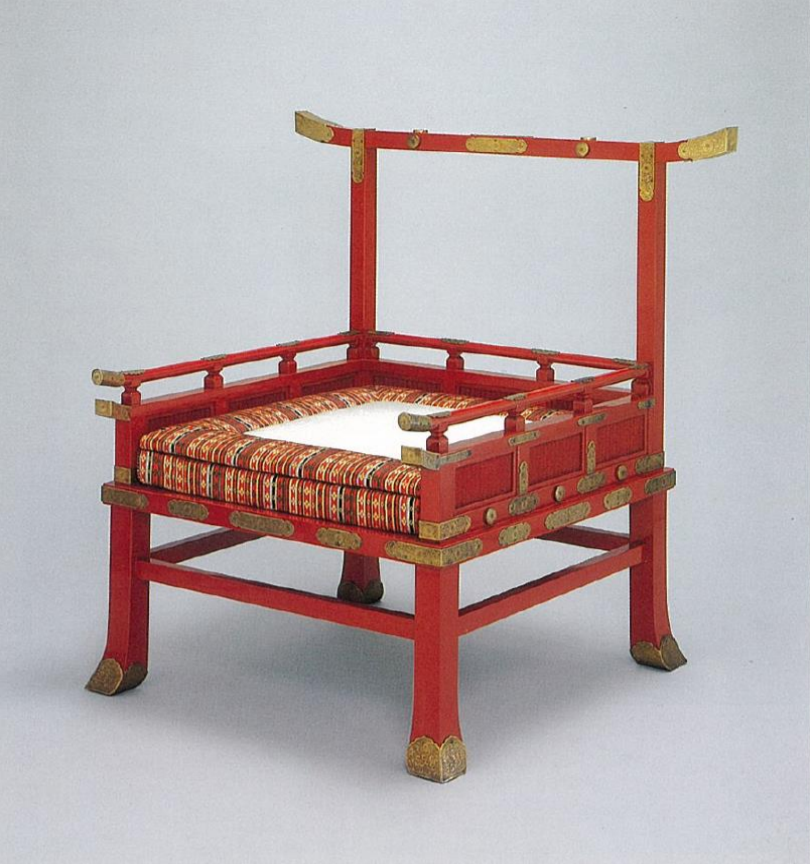
Replica of seat of emperor (御倚子) inside Takamikura throne.

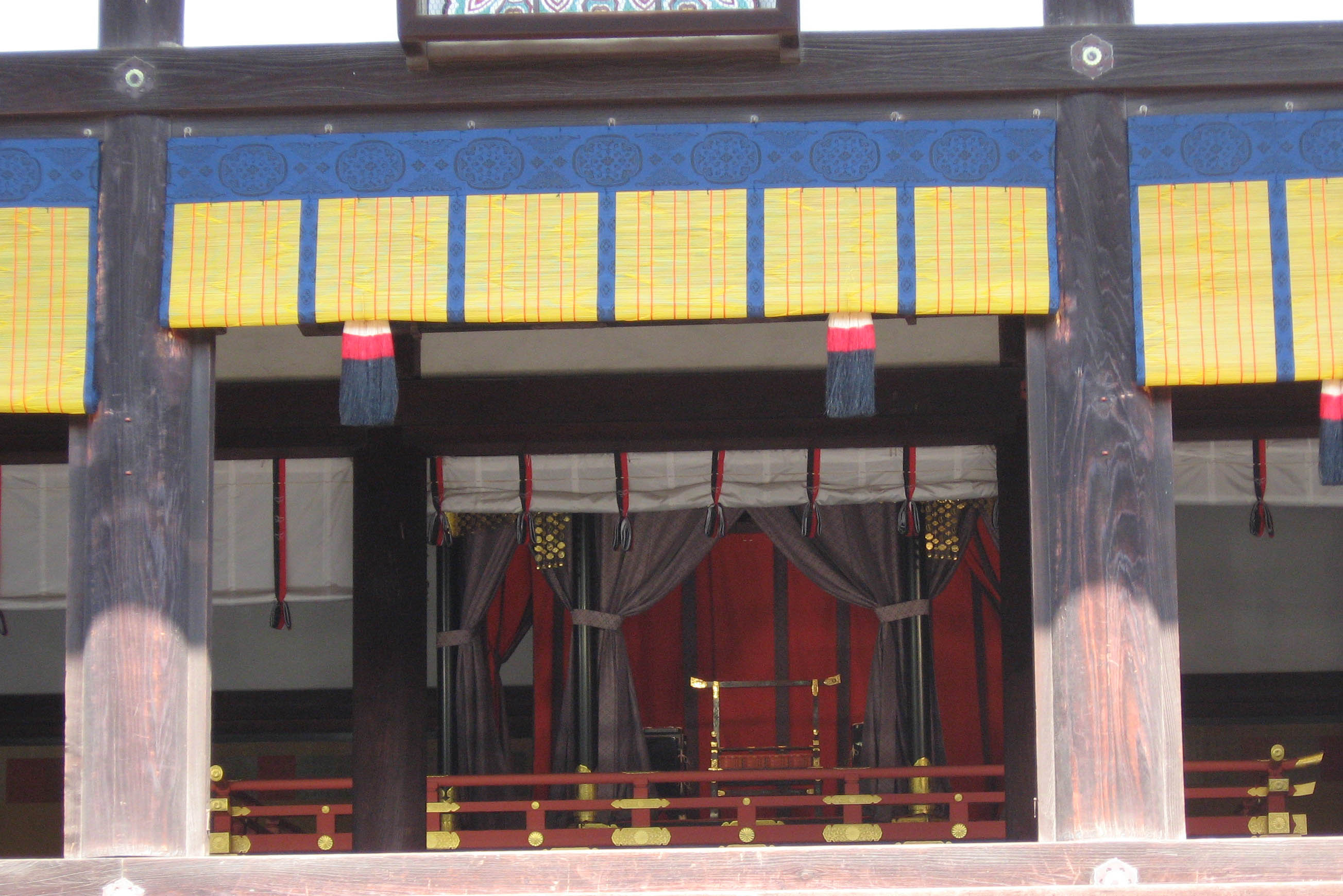
A glimpse of the Imperial throne in the main hall

The Takamikura (高御座) is the Imperial throne. It has been used on the occasion of the enthronement ceremonies commencing in 707 in the reign of Empress Genmei. The present throne was modeled on the original design, constructed in 1913, two years before the enthronement of Emperor Taishō. The actual throne is a chair in black lacquer, placed under an octagonal canopy resting on a three-tiered dais painted with black lacquer with balustrades of vermilion. On both sides of the throne are two little tables, where two of the three Imperial regalia (the sword and the jewel), and the privy seal and state seal would be placed. On top of the canopy is a statue of a large phoenix called hō-ō. Surrounding the canopy are eight small phoenixes, jewels and mirrors. Hanging from the canopy are metal ornaments and curtains.

The sliding door that hid the Emperor from view is called kenjō no shōji (賢聖障子), and has an image of 32 celestial saints (Ancient Chinese scholars) painted upon it, which became one of the primary models for all of Heian period painting.

==== Michodai ====
The Michodai (御帳台) is the August Seat of the Empress. The current throne was constructed in 1913. Its colour and shape are the same as the Takamikura, but is slightly smaller and more simple in comparison. The canopy is decorated with a statue of the mythical bird ranchō.

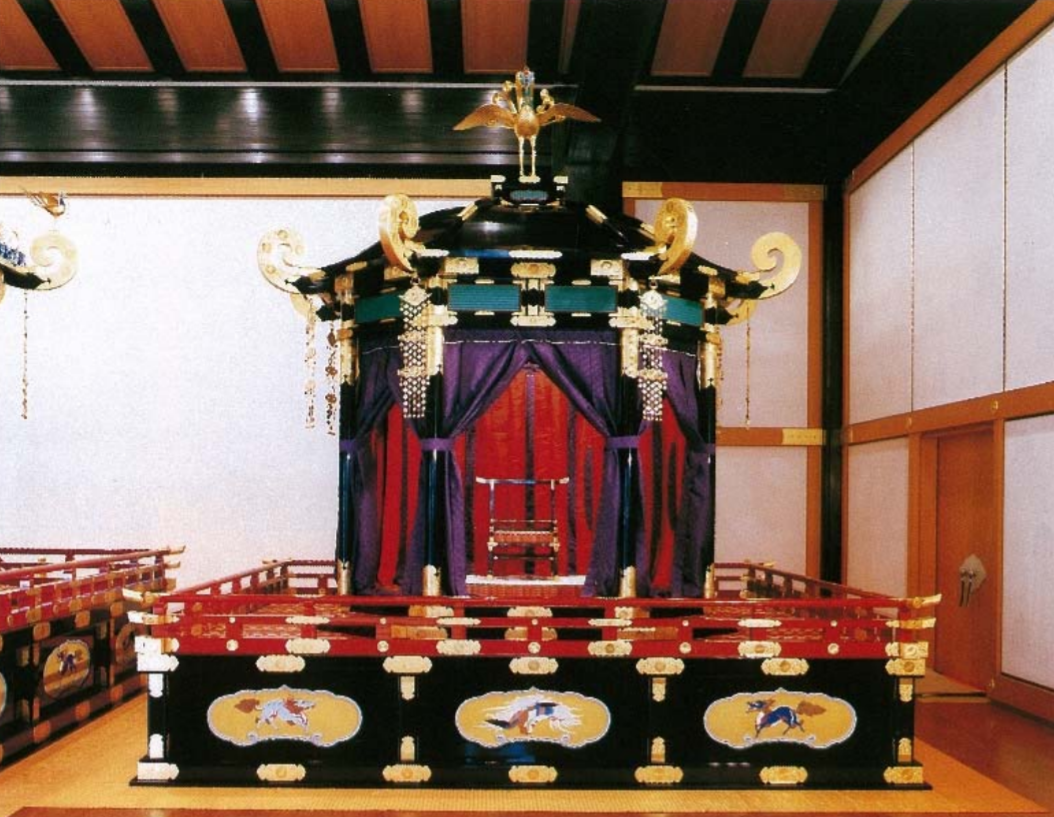
August seat of Empress.

The Imperial throne is always placed in the center of the main hall, the michodai to the right of it. Both thrones are kept away from public view through screens called misu.

=== Seiryōden ===
The Seiryōden (清涼殿) is located to the west of the Shishin-den and facing east which was originated from the Heian Palace, then became established as the Emperor's daily residence from the late 9th century. The original structure was built as the Emperor's residence at the end of the 8th century and was used until the 11th century. Along with the Shishinden (throne hall), it has been the stage for important traditional court ceremonies. Following the construction of the Otsunegoten building by Toyotomi Hideyoshi's donation in 1590 as a new residence for the Emperor, Seiryōden was used exclusively for ceremonies. The Seiryō-den was rebuilt in this location in 1790 CE, on a smaller scale than the original building but preserving the original structure.

The architectural space of the Seiryōden has undergone changes due to shifts in lifestyle and function. However, during the Kansei era (1855) reconstruction, it was restored based on the ancient Heian period style (Shinden-zukuri), along with the Shishinden and other buildings. The current Seiryōden, with its furnishings and decorations made to match the architectural style of the building, offers valuable insights into the traditions and culture of the Emperor's residence and the lifestyle of that era.

The central rectangular area is called Moya (母屋), measuring 9 ken (20 meters) in width and 2 ken (6 meters) in length. Surrounding it on all sides is a corridor-like wooden-floored space called Hisashi. Additionally on the outside of the Shitomido (outer doors), there is a veranda-like wooden-floored space called Hiro-bisashi (or Mago-bisashi). Unlike the Shishinden, which was a building dedicated to residence of emperor, later only ceremonies in 1590, the interior of the Seiryōden has many partitions and is divided into rooms according to their use, reflecting the characteristics of residential spaces in the late Heian period.

In the Edo period, traditional ceremonies were held in this building: the Kenji-togyo (Transfer of the Sacred Sword and Jade), the Judai (the entry of a highest-ranking court noble's daughter into the Imperial court to become the Imperial Consort), the Boukan-jimoku (Appointment of Court Officials), the Kochobai (Imperial Audience), the Daishoji-gozen (Imperial Ceremonial Meal), Shinto and Buddhist rituals, and the Shihohai (literally "Prayer to the Four Quarters", referring to the Emperor's New Year Prayer held at the East Garden in front of the Seiryōden). In this way, the entire building of the Seiryōden was an extremely important ceremonial space where the Emperor would appear and ceremonies were conducted. Considering the importance of such a building, although the size has been reduced from the original Seiryōden, its restoration has been achieved.

The Koromogae (changing of attire and furnishings) was held in the fourth and tenth months of the lunar calendar, which was an annual observance in the court. On the first day of the fourth and tenth months of the lunar calendar, attires and interior furnishings were changed to match the season. This observance was a seasonal custom to herald the arrival of a new season. Even today, the draperies of the Mihchōdai (Imperial Canopy) and the Kabeshiro (Wall Hangings) are changed to match the season to welcome visitors with seasonal decorations.

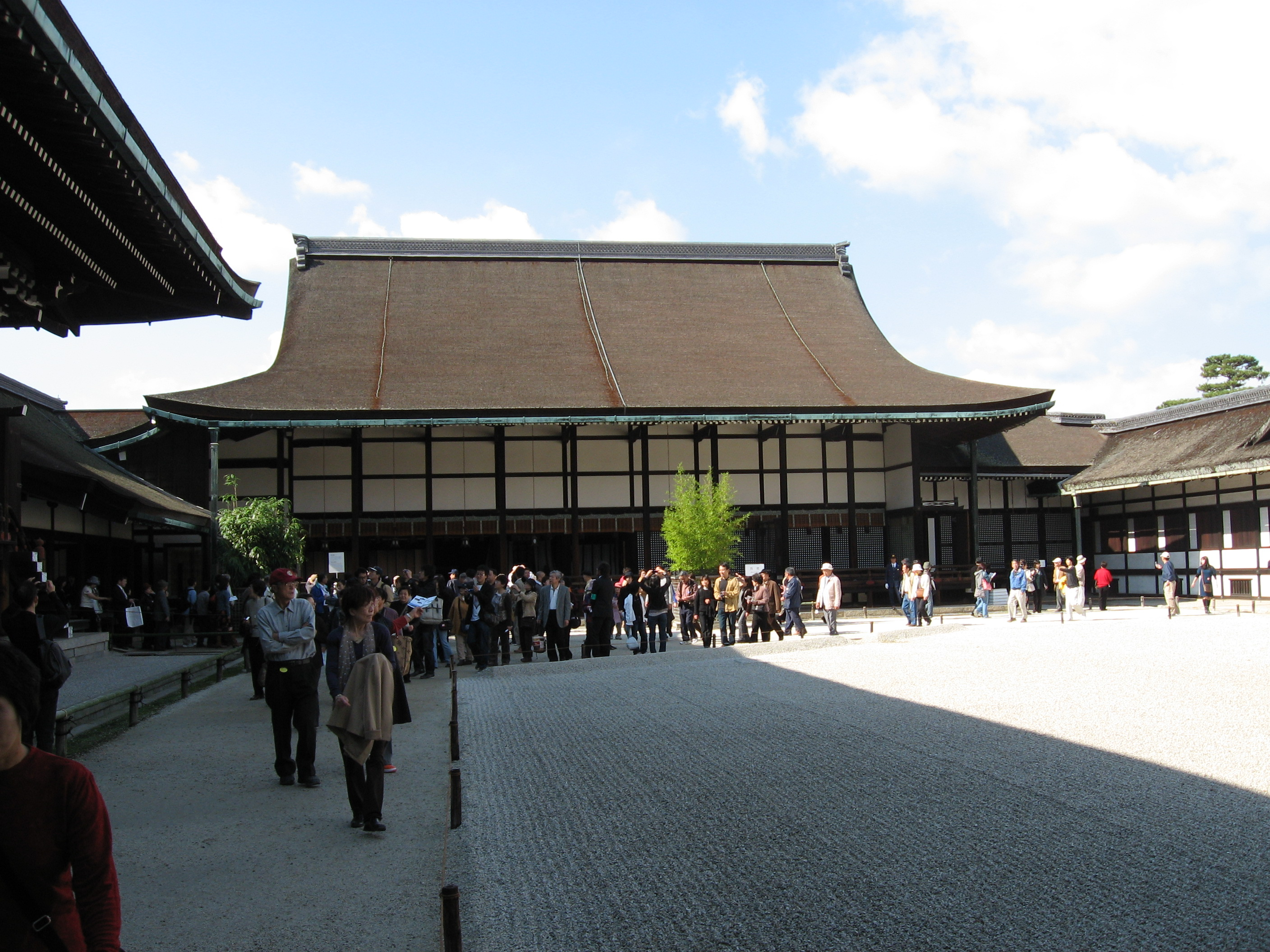
Seiryōden

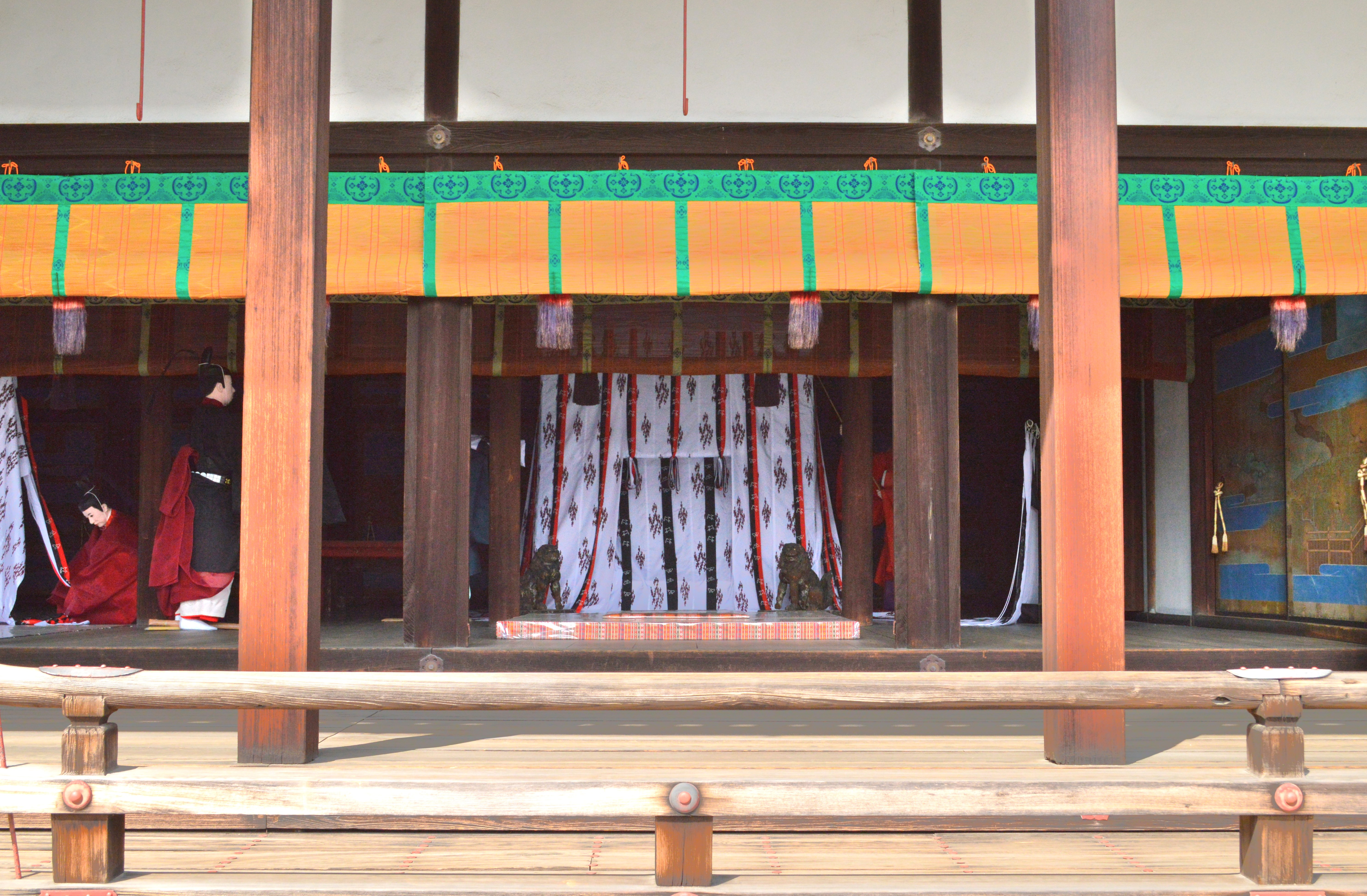
Michōdai (御帳台) baldachin installed as the throne of the emperor

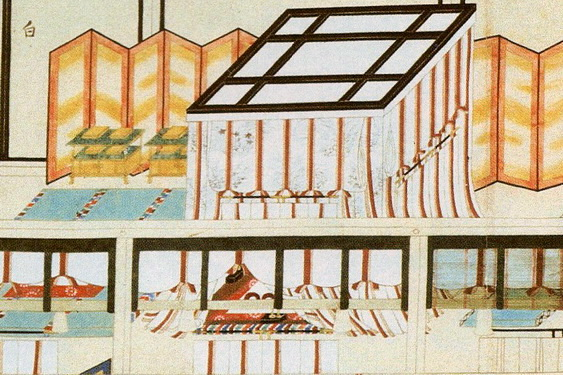
Michōdai (御帳台) baldachin installed as the throne of the emperor.

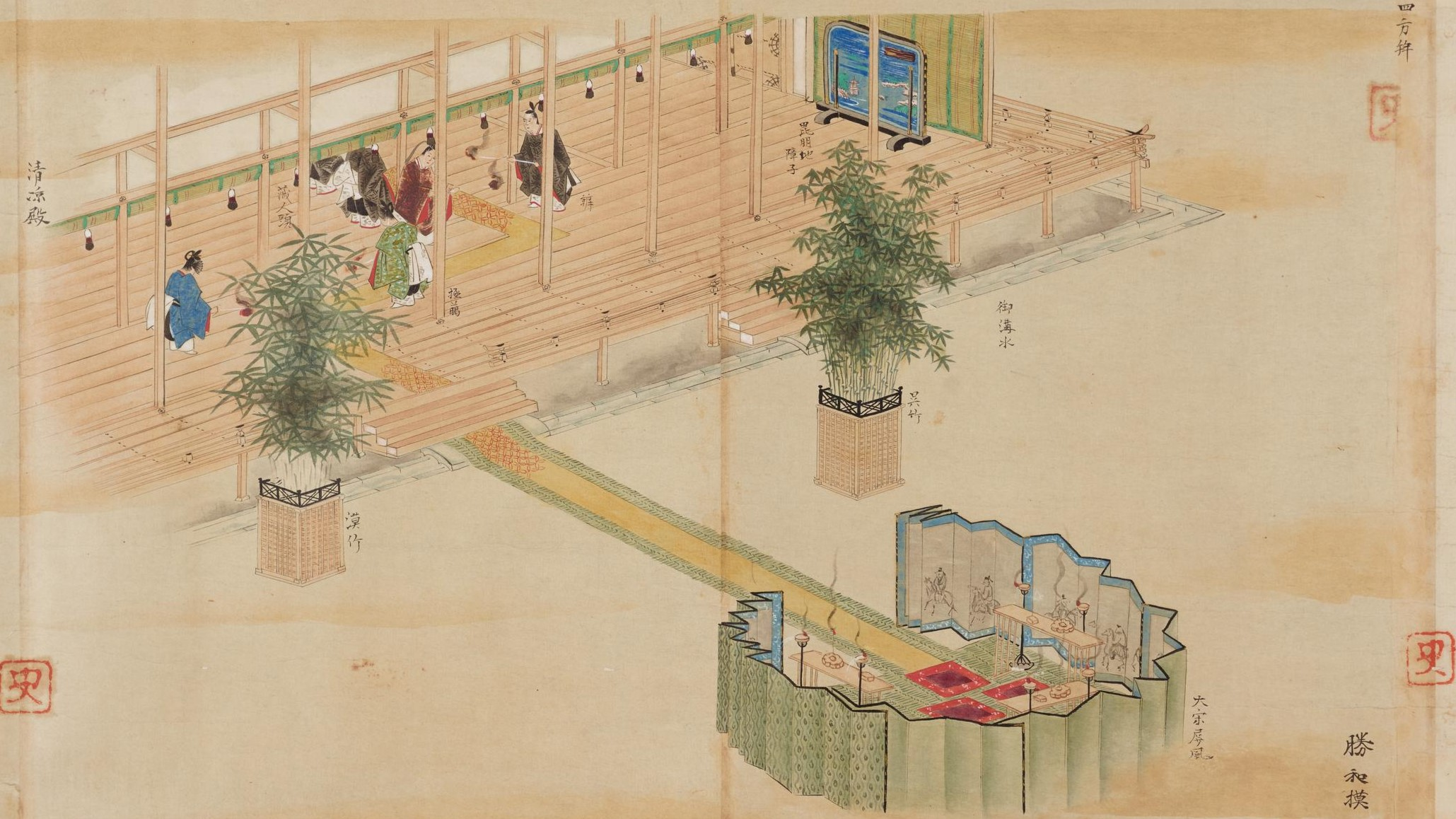
Shihouhai (四方拝) ceremony at Seiryōden.

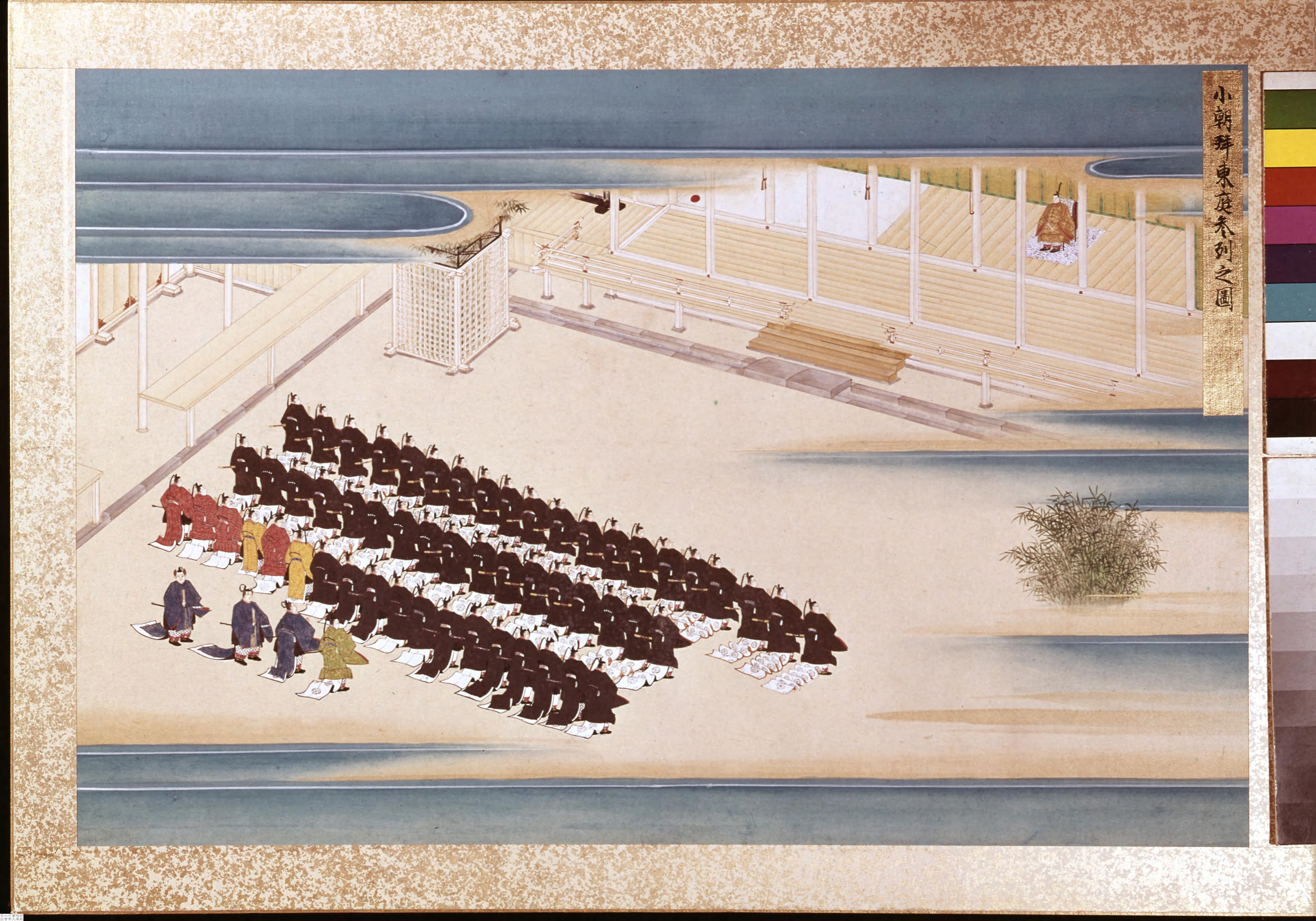
Emperor Komei conducted Kochohai ceremony (小朝拝) at Seiryoden.

=== Kogosho ===
The Kogosho (小御所) is a place where the Emperor received bannermen under the direct control of the Tokugawa shogun (buke). It was also used for some rituals. the building was built in the Imperial palace from the medieval period. The layout of the Kogosho, featuring upper, middle, and lower floor-level rooms, was designed to accommodate Imperial audiences with samurai and envoys from the shogunate. It is best known for the "Kogosho Conference," held during the Meiji Restoration to discuss the treatment of Tokugawa Yoshinobu following the Taisei Hōkan (the formal return of political authority to the Emperor). The Kogosho has occasionally served as a substitute for Heian-period palace buildings with historical significance, particularly during important imperial ceremonies. Alongside the Shishinden and Seiryōden, it has been the site of key rituals related to imperial succession.

Reflecting its ceremonial role, the Kogosho features architectural elements similar to those of the Seiryōden, including fusuma shōji (sliding doors decorated with Konjobiki multicolored designs), nuno shōji (fabric-covered sliding doors with ink paintings), and shitomi-do (latticed shutters). When the tatami mats and partitions are removed and traditional furnishings are arranged, the space can be transformed to resemble a Heian-period palace interior. Due to its high practicality, the Kogosho was also used for various purposes, such as waka poetry gatherings and musical performances. This distinctive building shows a blend of architectural elements of Shinden-zukuri and Shoin-zukuri styles.

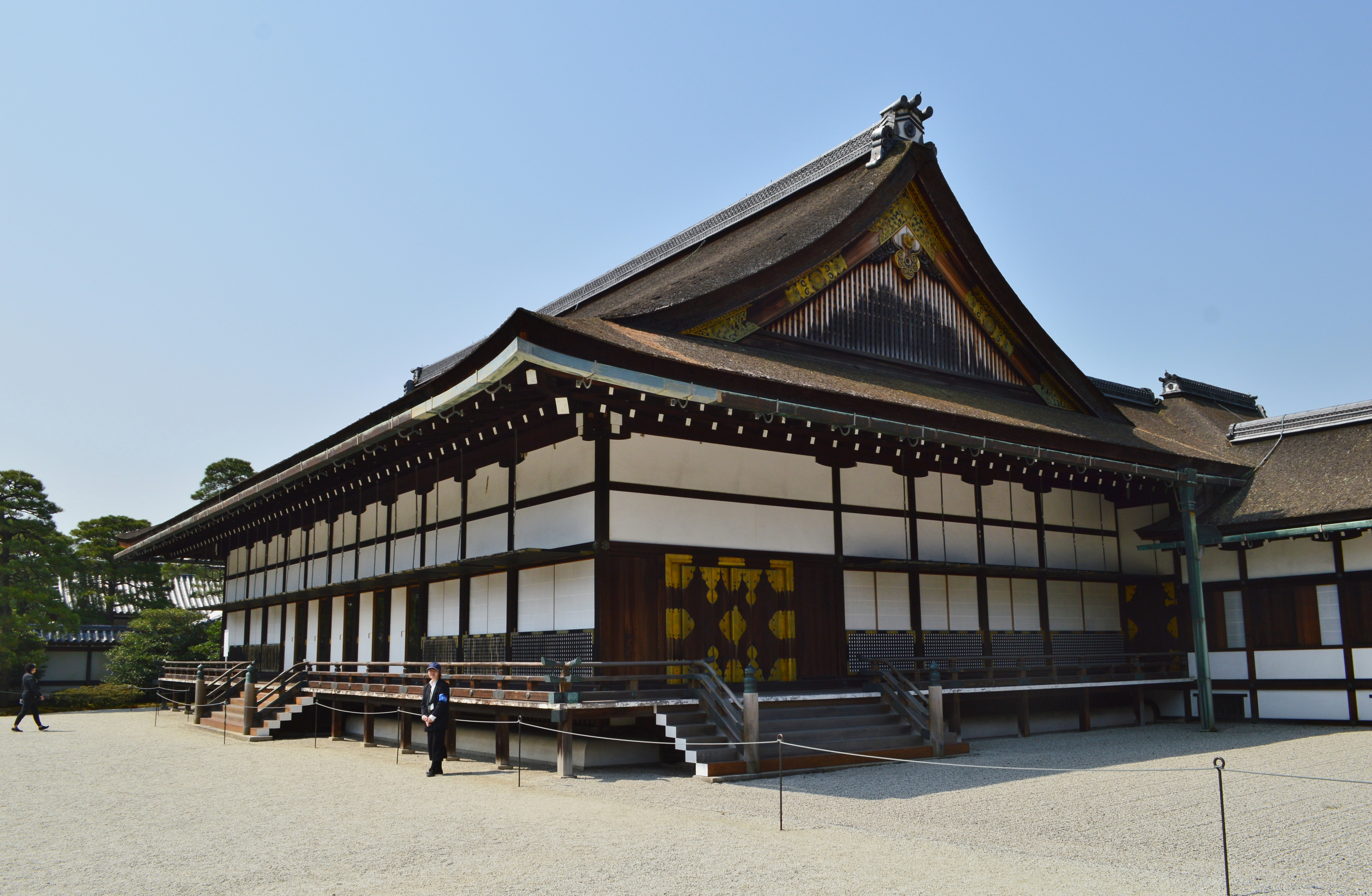
Kogosho hall.

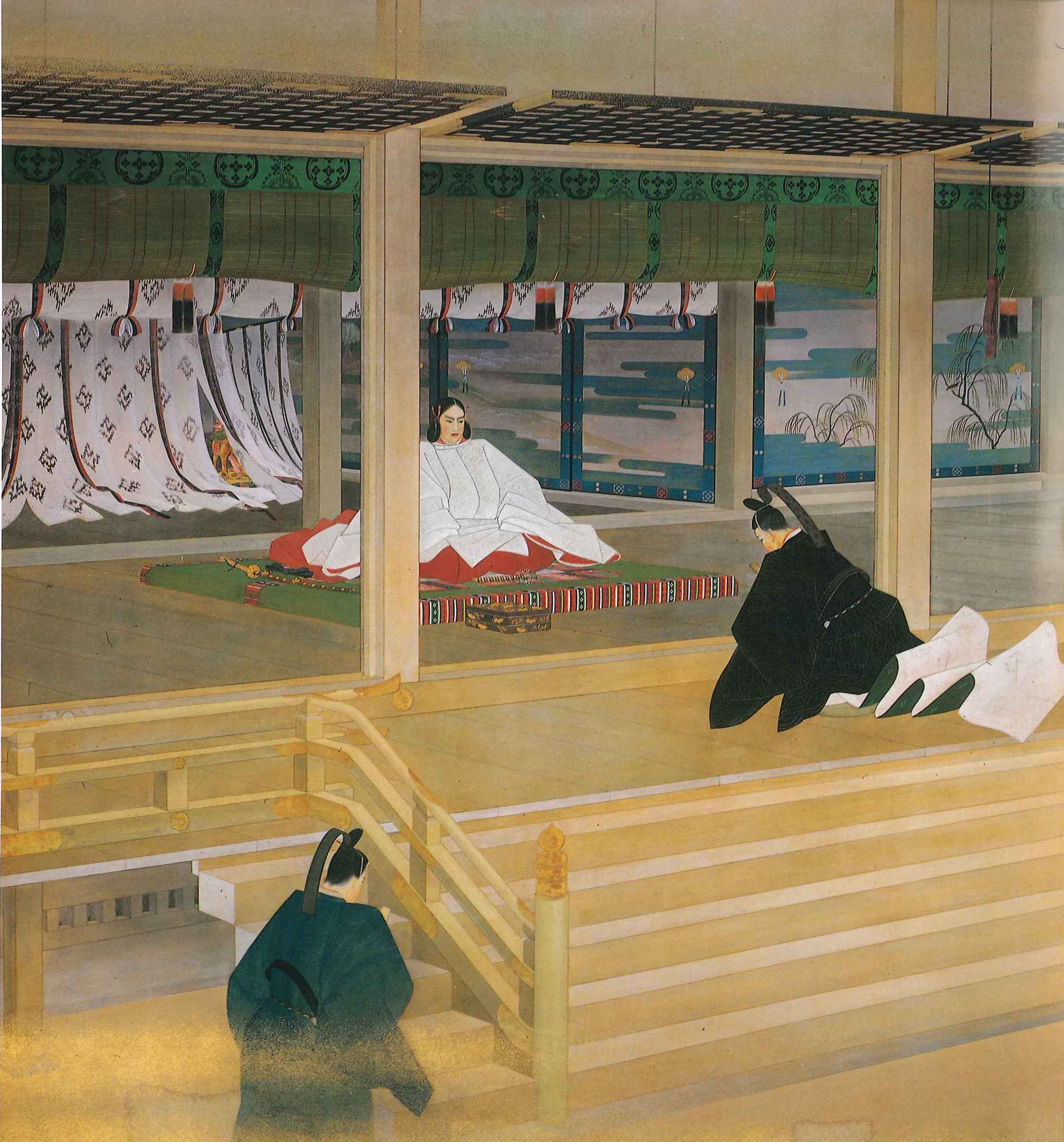
The picture depicts prince Mutsuhito ascending to the throne and appointing Nijō Nariyuki (kowtowing) as regent. The ceremony should be conducted at Seiryoden but the body of Emperor Kōmei was enshrined in the Seiryōden at the time, the succession ceremony was held in the Kogosho instead, which served as a temporary Seiryōden.

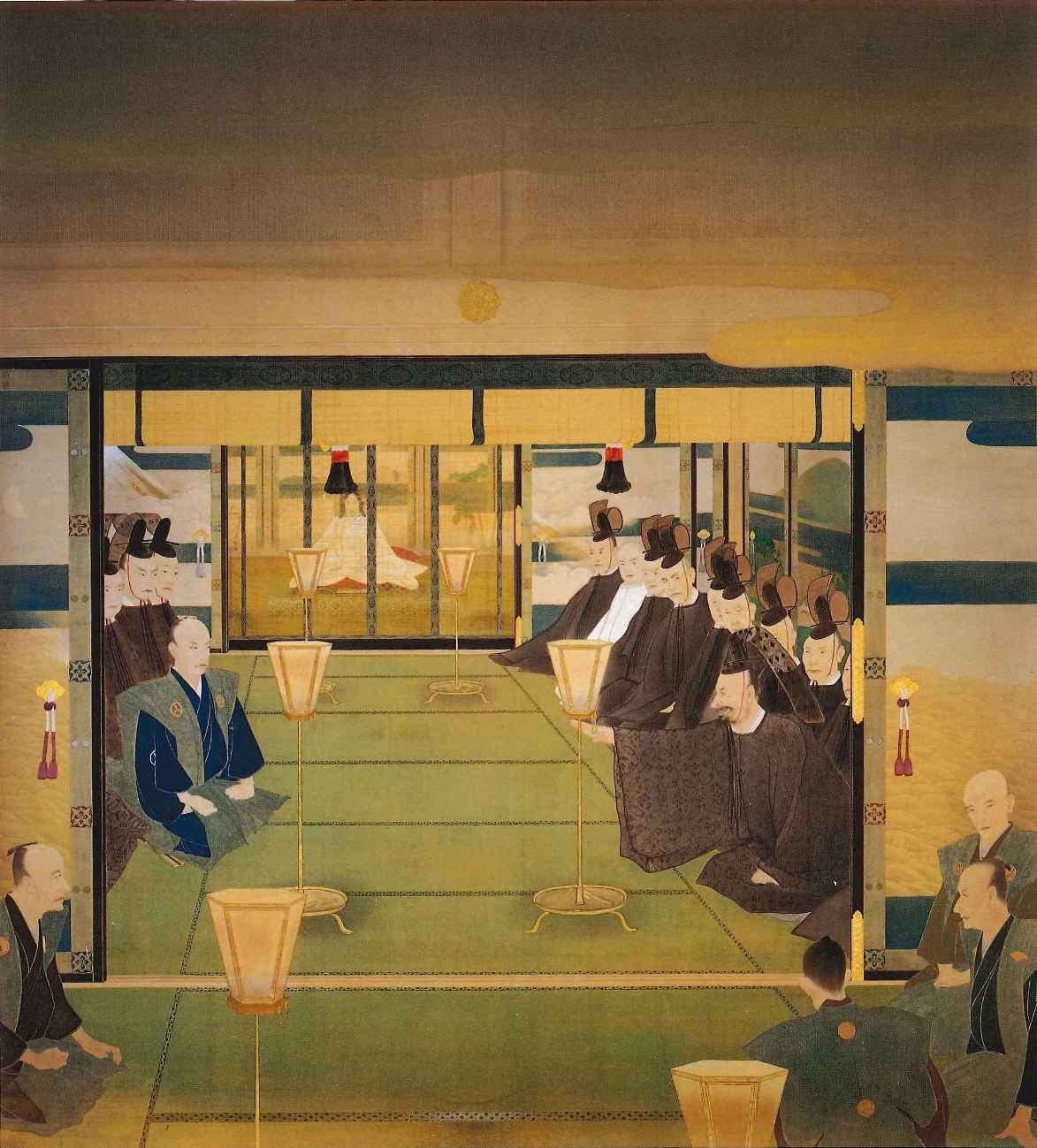
The conference of Meiji restoration (王政復古) at Kogosho. Young emperor Meiji sat in the far north behind the Sudare.

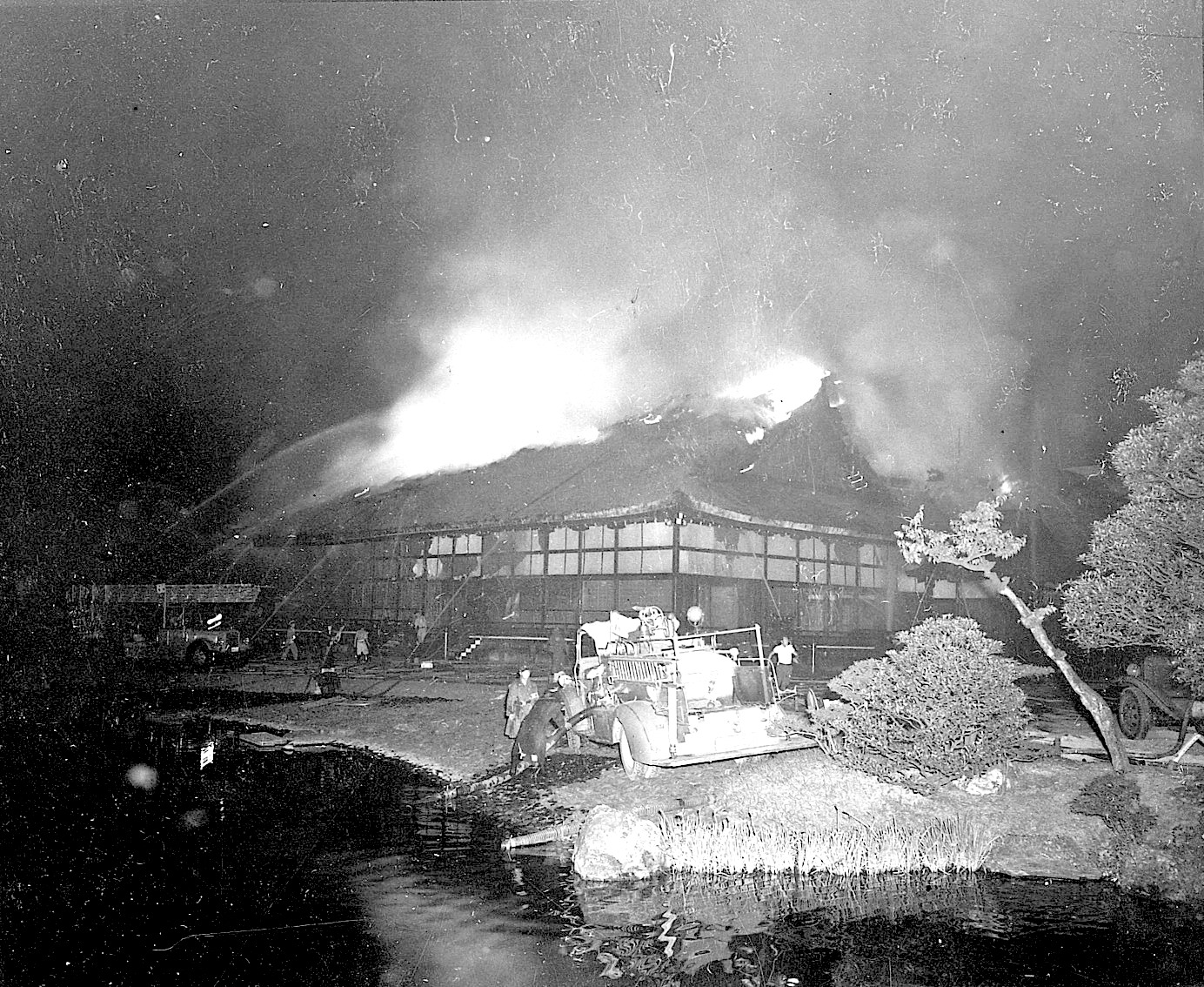
The building was destroyed by fire in 16 August 1954, and rebuilt later.

The Kogosho Conference was held here on the night of December 9, 1867, the declaration of the restoration of imperial rule (osei fukko). The structure burnt down in 1954 and was reconstructed in 1958.

=== Ogakumonjo ===
The study hall Ogakumonjo (御学問所) was used for events such as the New Year's Lectures, as well as for academic study, entertainment, reading rites, a monthly poetry recital and as a venue for the emperor to meet with court nobles. It was built in Shoin-zukuri style building with an irimoya hiwadabuki roof.

The Ogakumonjo was first seen in the Imperial palace during the Nanboku-cho period (1336-1392). It became an independent building during the Edo period and built in Keicho-era (1613) by donation of by Tokugawa Ieyasu. In the Keicho-era, activities and ceremonies such as calligraphy practice, waka poetry gatherings, and reading sessions were regularly held here. Initially, these activities were to enhance the education of Emperor Gomizuno-o himself and court nobles in close attendance. To the north, there was a large library and easily accessible by a corridor from the Ogakumonjo and the Otsunegoten located to the west.

Afterwards, it was rebuilt seven times due to fires, and its scale and form changed differently in each era. The current building was constructed during Ansei 2 (1855), was used for academic and artistic ceremonies such as Otokusho-hajime (First Reading Ceremony) and waka poetry gatherings. It also served as an audience chamber and a temporary residence during the restoration of the Otsunegoten. Emperor Kōmei met the Shoguns Tokugawa Iemochi and Tokugawa Yoshinobu here. Years later, the "Edict of the Restoration of the Imperial Rule" was issued here on December 9, Keio 3 (1867) in the presence of Emperor Meiji.

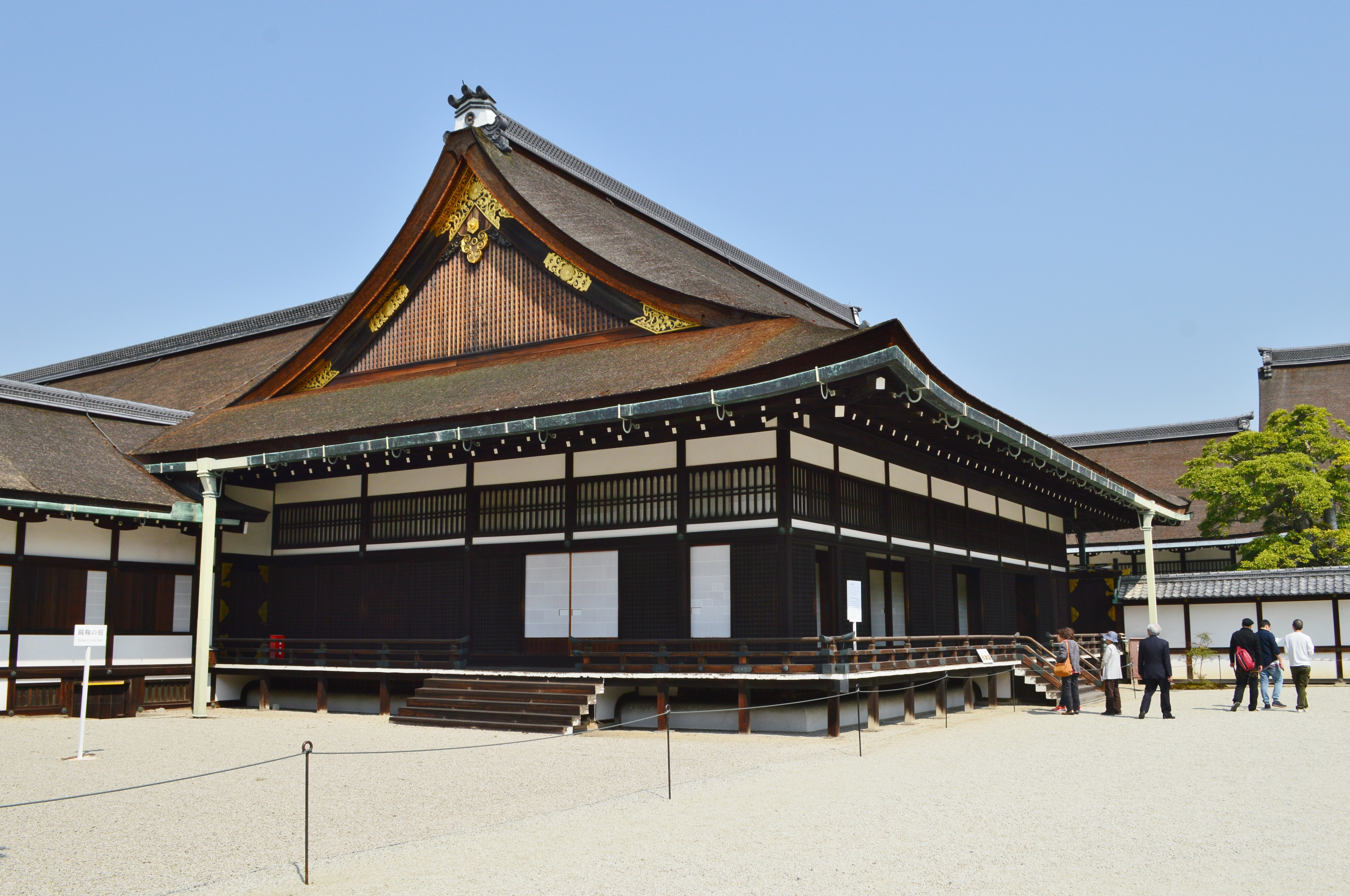
Study hall.

=== Otsunegoten ===
The Otsunegoten (御常御殿) was first built in 1590 when samurai ruler Toyotomi Hideyoshi donated money to renovate the palace. The purpose of building this palace was to shift the function as the Emperor's living quarters from the Seiryoden into an independent palace. Since then, the Otsunegoten had served as the Emperor's living quarters for centuries. After 1869, when Emperor Meiji moved to Tokyo, the Otsunegoten had been used as the Emperor's accommodations during their visits to Kyoto until the end of World War II. The three rooms facing south are Jodan-no-ma (上段の間), Chudan-no-ma (中段の間) and Gedan-no-ma (下段の間), which were used for ceremonies and gatherings such as the New Year Greeting Ceremony and Seasonal Banquets. Jodan-no-ma is the highest-ranked rooms; it has a raised floor where the Emperor was seated, on which the Emperor's seat was placed, and is furnished with the Chodai-gamae (ornamental doorway giving access to the Kenji-no-ma room where the Imperial Regalia were placed) behind the Emperor's seat. In addition to the difference in floor level, each room has its own respective ceiling decorated in a different style. These differences, which show the status of the people who sat in the room, are characteristics of the Shoin-zukuri architectural style.

The east side of the building was a space for Emperor's daily life. Sliding doors were furnished instead of the old style Shitomi latticed shutters found in the south side of the building because functionality was prioritized in the east side. Otsunegoten preserves and conveys the tradition of the Emperor's living quarters and the evolution of Japanese architectural styles to the present day.

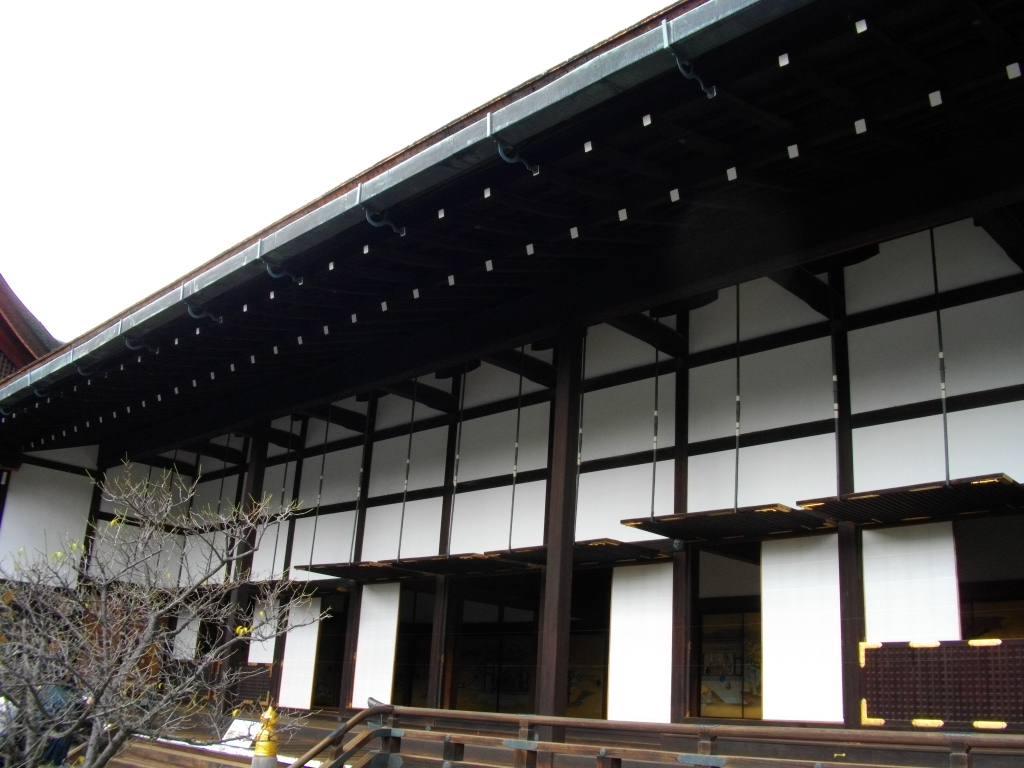
Southern facade

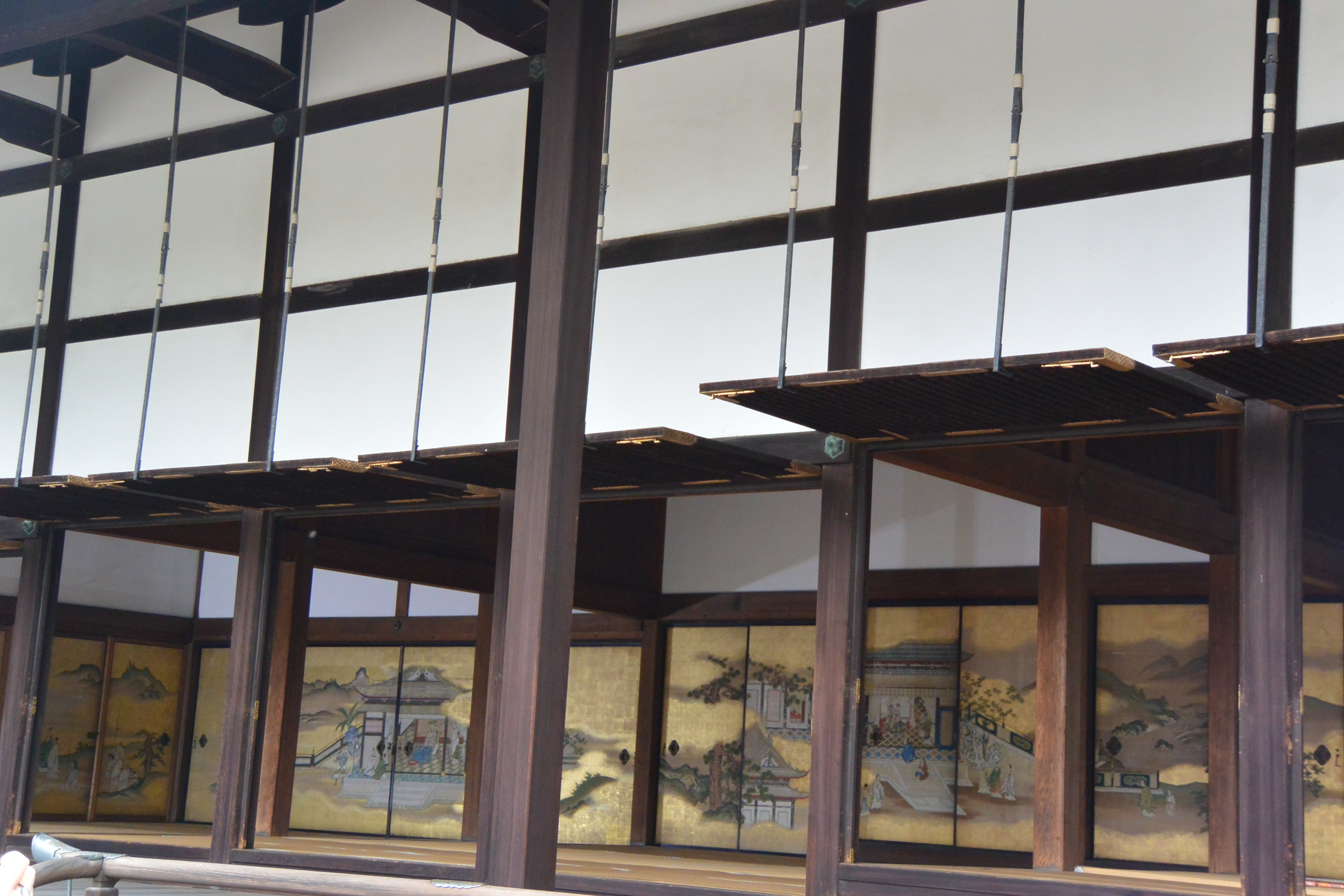
Southern facade

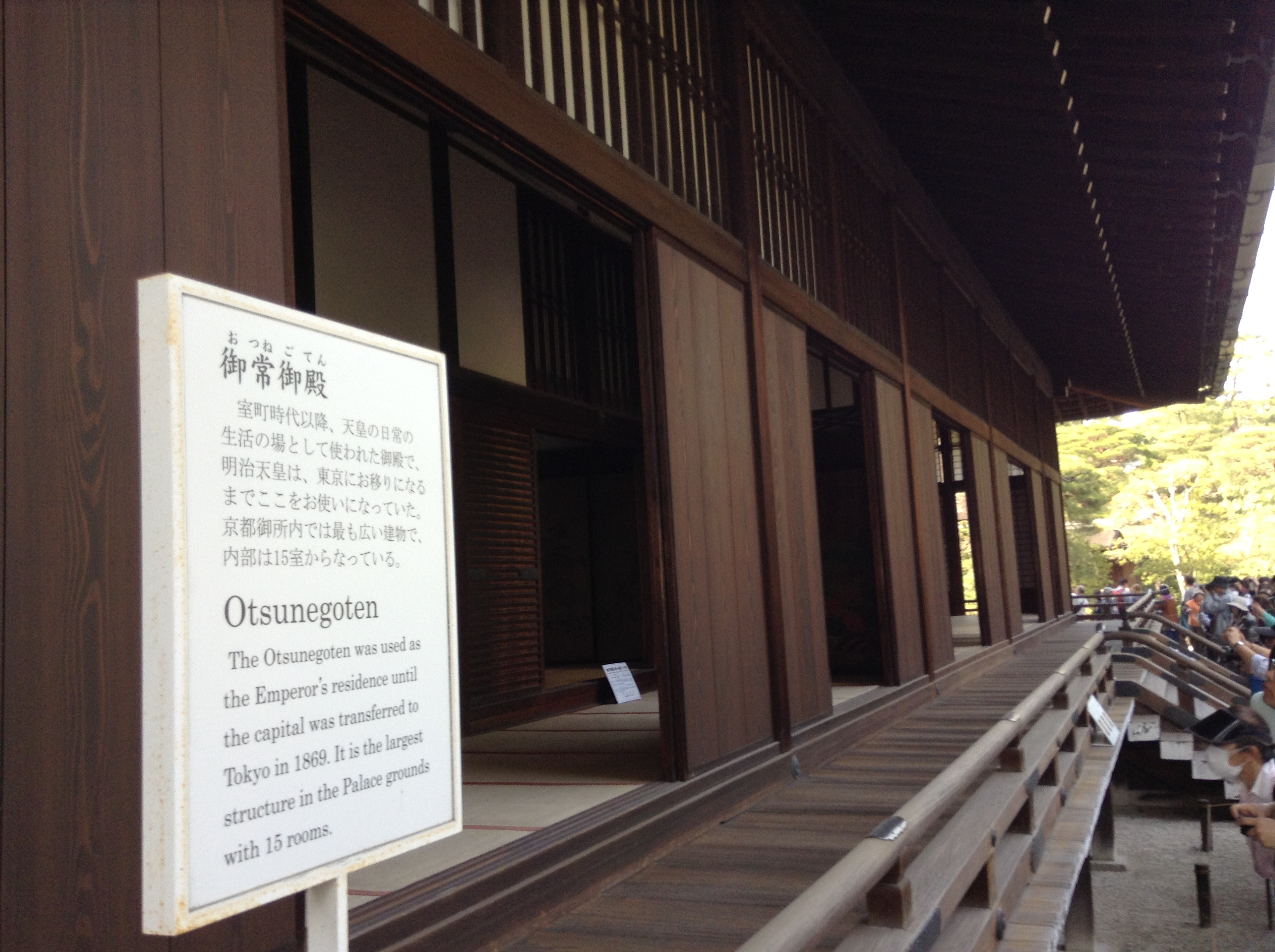
Eastern facade

=== Osuzumisho ===
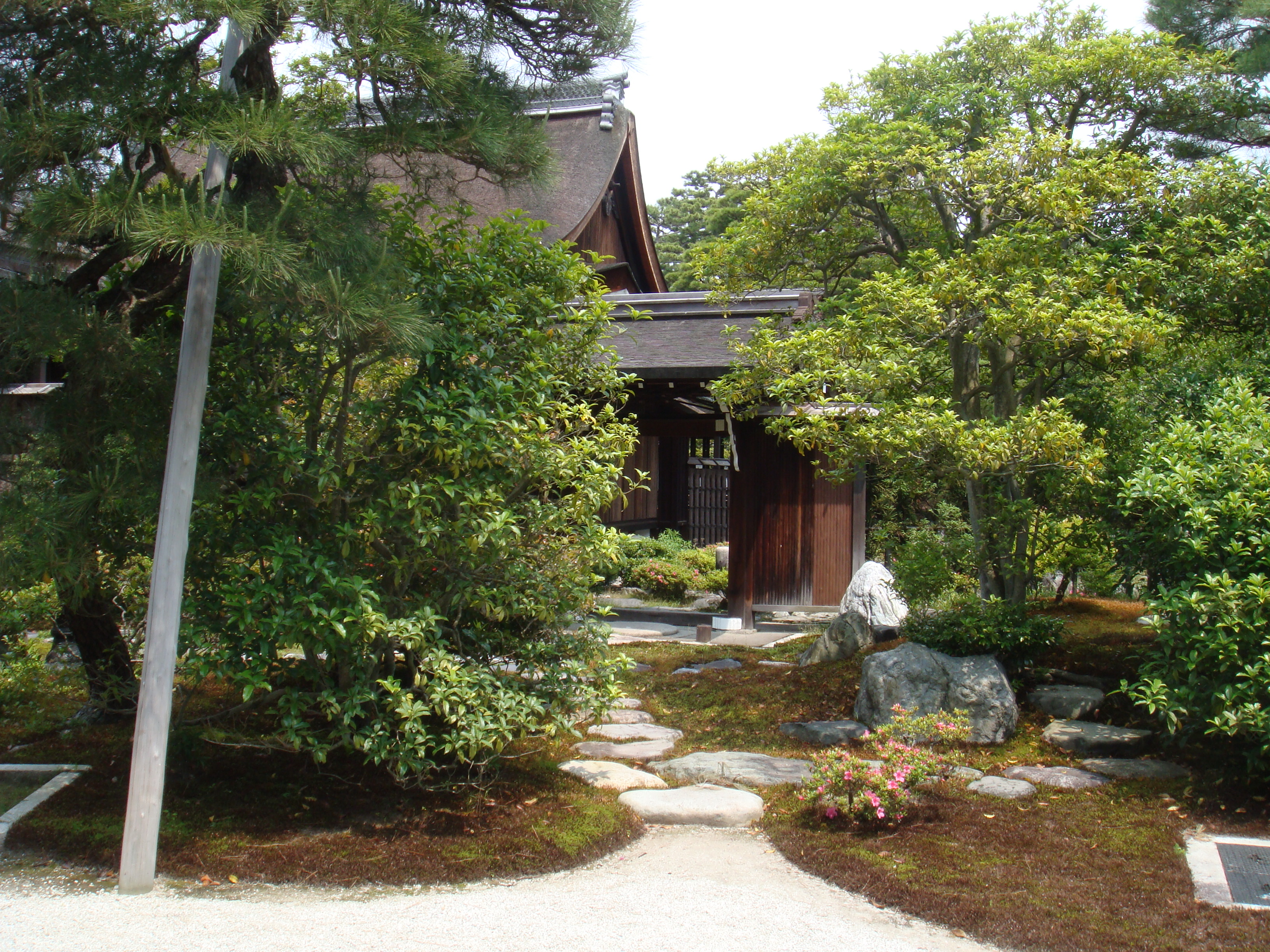
Osuzumisho

The Osuzumisho (御涼所) is the summer residence for the Emperor. The Osuzumisho is a gabled, cypress-barked, east-west wing building that connects from the inner garden through the Ryusenmon Gate to the north of the Kyoto Imperial Palace's New Year gate, and was designed primarily to provide a comfortable stay during Kyoto's hot summers, with many windows.

=== Koshun ===
The Koshun (迎春) is a study hall that was used by Emperor Komei, who reigned from 1846 to 1866.

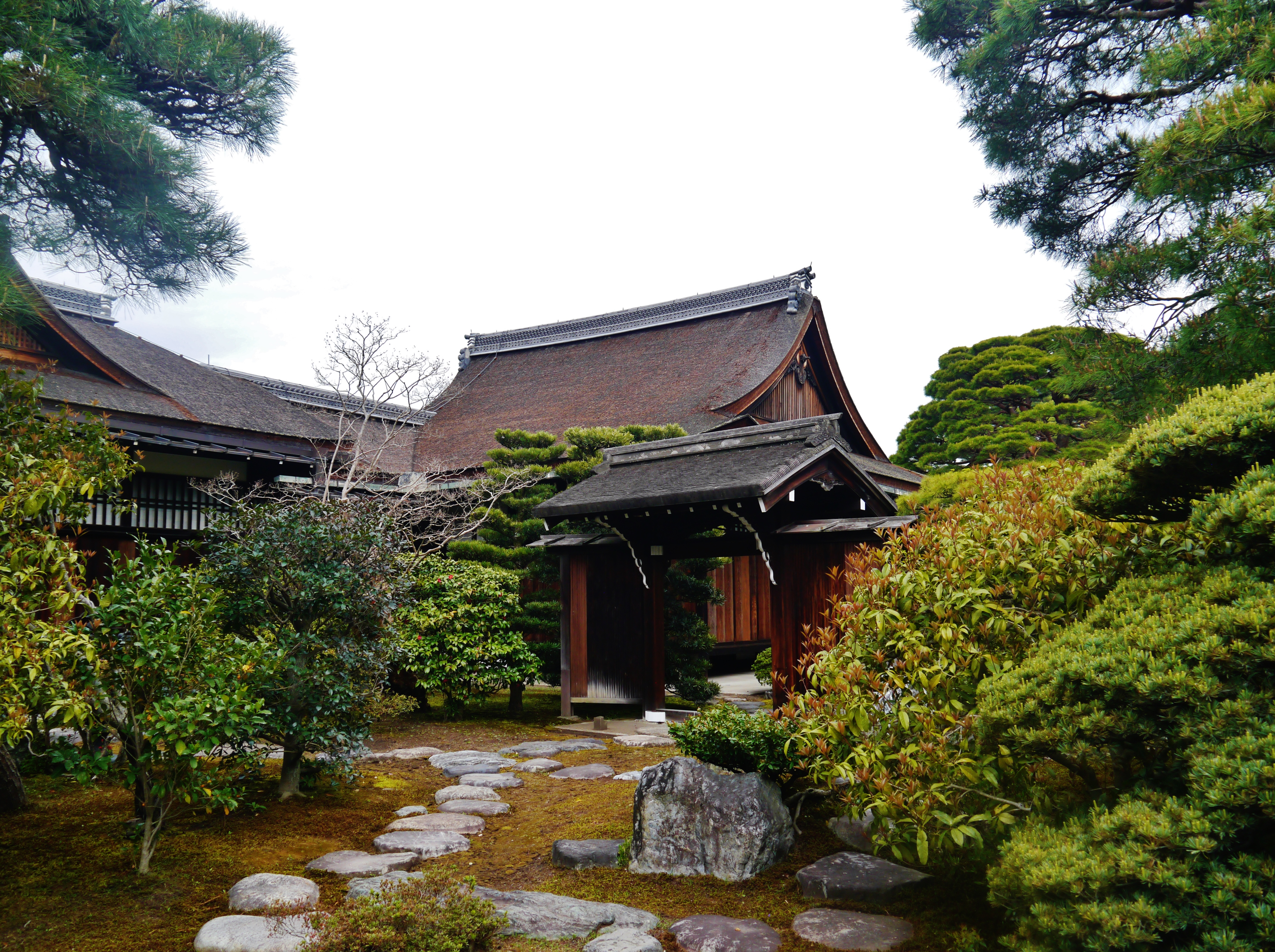
Koshun

=== Omima ===
The Omima (御三間) which literally means "three rooms", is a palace with three rooms. The Omima rooms were originally part of the Otsunegoten and later became a separate building, which is connected to the Otsunegoten via a corridor on the north side. The Mairado (wooden sliding door) on the south side of the western Goenzashiki was a doorway to the corridor (that has been removed) connecting to the Ogakumonjo building. The Omima served as a passageway for the Emperor. In other words, it was a relay point for going from the inner quarters to the outer quarters in the Imperial Palace. It also served as a secondary palace to the Otsunegoten. For example, after the death of the Emperor, the articles of the Imperial Regalia were transferred from the Otsunegoten to the Jodan-no-ma Upper Room of the Omima, and it functioned as a temporary residence for the new Emperor. Some small-scale ceremonies, such as the Fukasogi ceremony, which celebrated the healthy growth of the princes and princesses, Noh performance viewing in March, the Chinowa-kuguri purification ceremony in June, and the Tanabata waka poem creating ceremony in July were held here.It was also used for some unofficial ceremonies such as the Star Festival and the Bon festival.

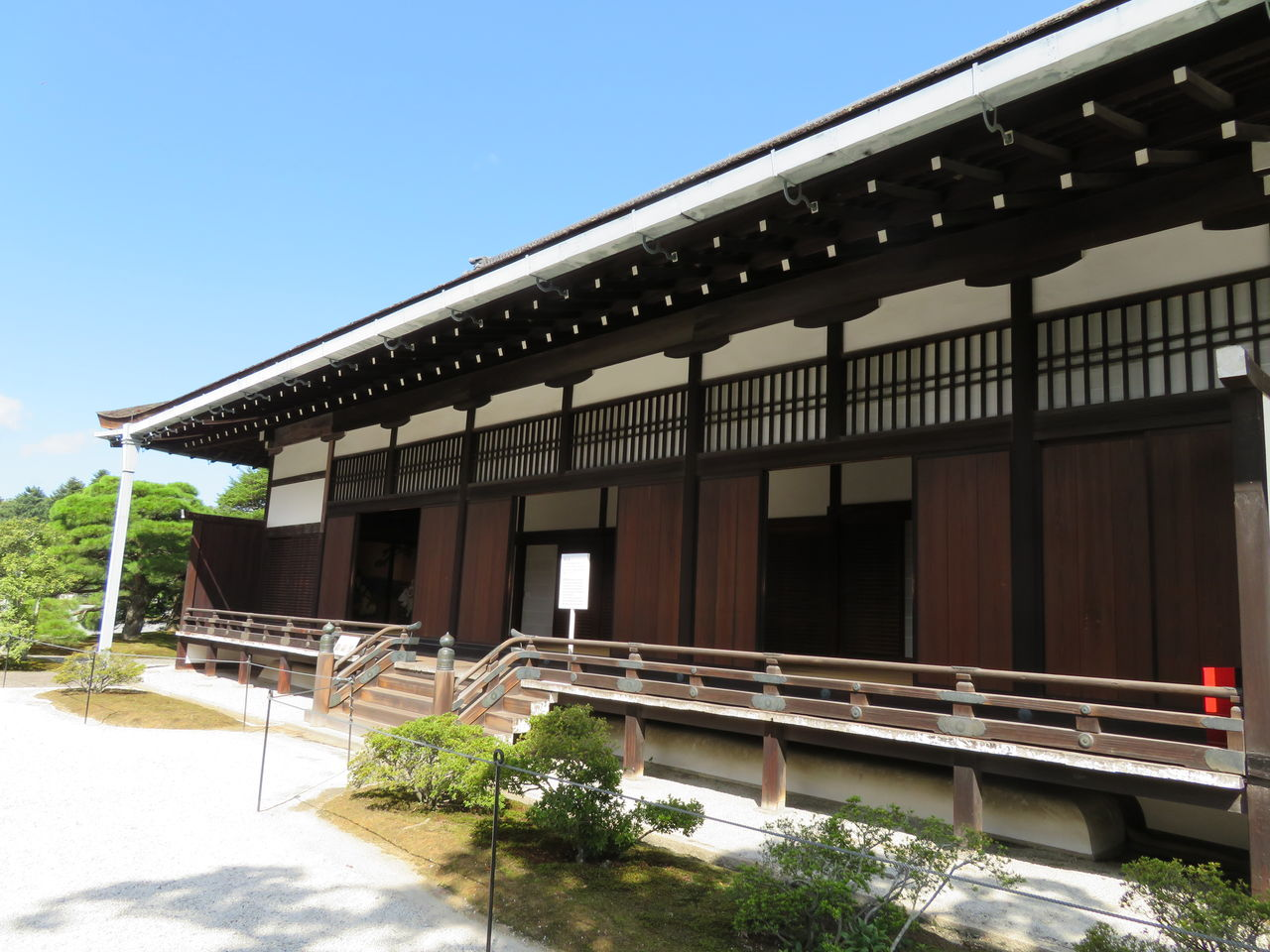
Omima hall

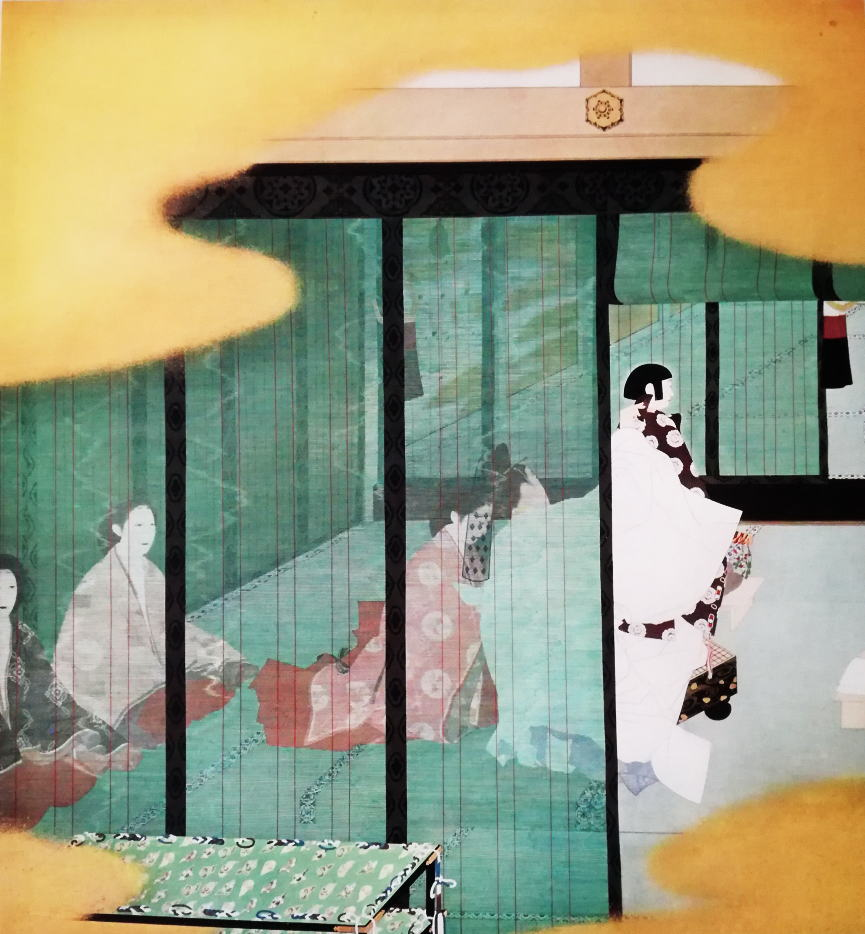
Rites of growth conducted for crown prince Mutsuhito (standing on go board) at "Chudan-no-ma" room (中段の間), Omima.

=== Kogo Gotsunegoten ===
The Empress's Gotsunegoten (also known as the Nyogogoten and Jungogoten) served as the residence of the Empress and consorts. It is a gabled building with a cypress bark roof and an east-west wing. Proceeding north along the corridor from the Empress's Otsune Goten, one comes upon the "Okuroto" (Buddhist altar room) on the right. Beyond that, across the Fujitsubo (small courtyard garden), are the Wakamiya-Himemiya Goten to the west and the Hikasha (a ceremonial hall) to the north.

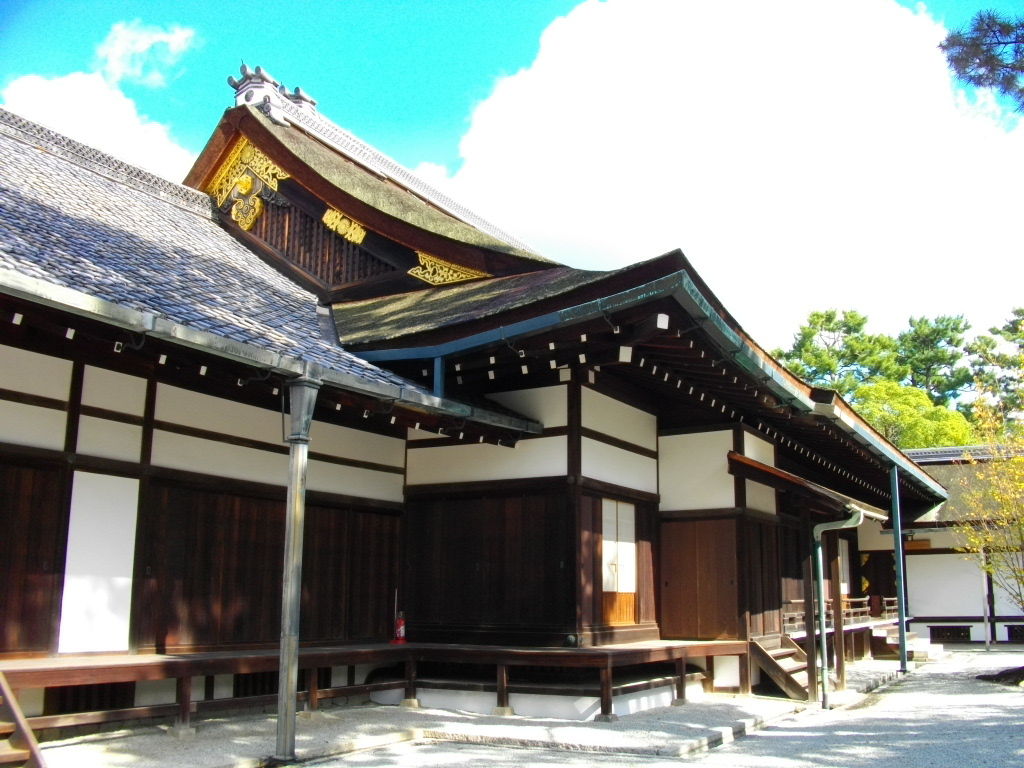
Kogogu Tsune-goten (皇后御常御殿), Residence of Empress and emperor's consorts

=== The Wakamiya Goten and the Himemiya Goten ===
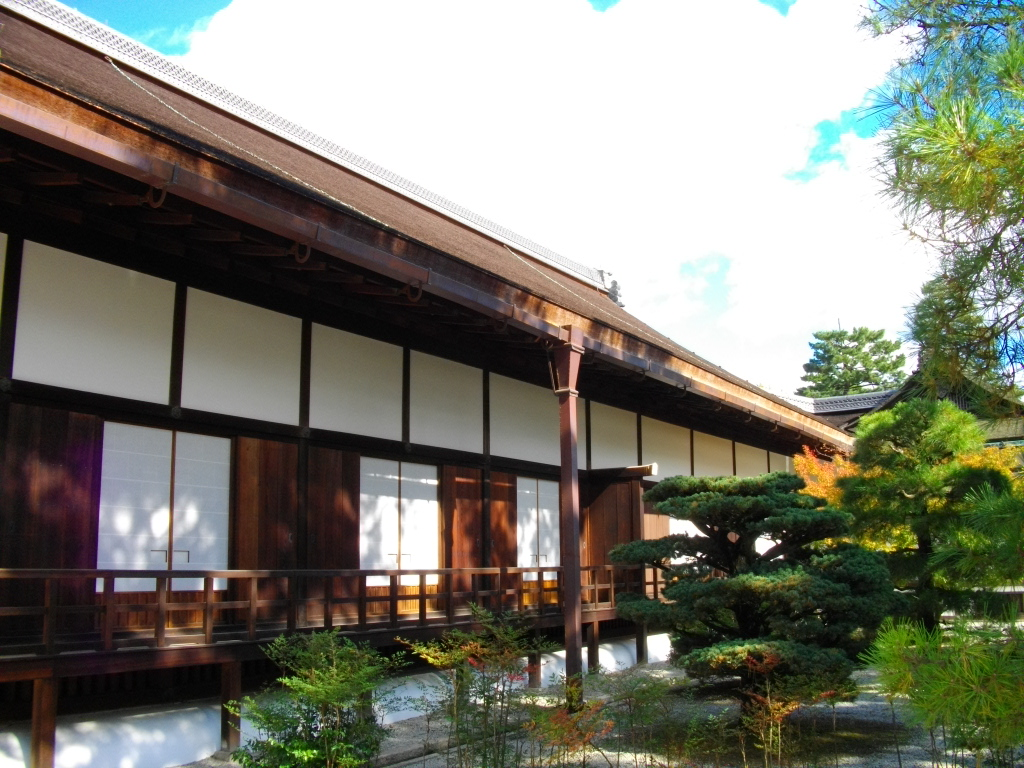
Wakamiya Goten & Himemiya Goten (若宮御殿, 姫宮御殿), Residence of princes and princesses.

The Wakamiya hall and the Himemiya hall are a single building, with the Wakamiya Palace on the east side and the Himemiya Palace on the west side. Both palaces have a "Gojodan" (upper level) on the east side and a "next room" on the west side, and in front of these is a continuous "Goen-zashiki" (story hall) that runs through the Wakamiya Palace and the Himemiya Palace. Wakamiya palace was the residence of prince while Himeyama was served as residence for princesses.

== Historical existing parts of Imperial palace ==
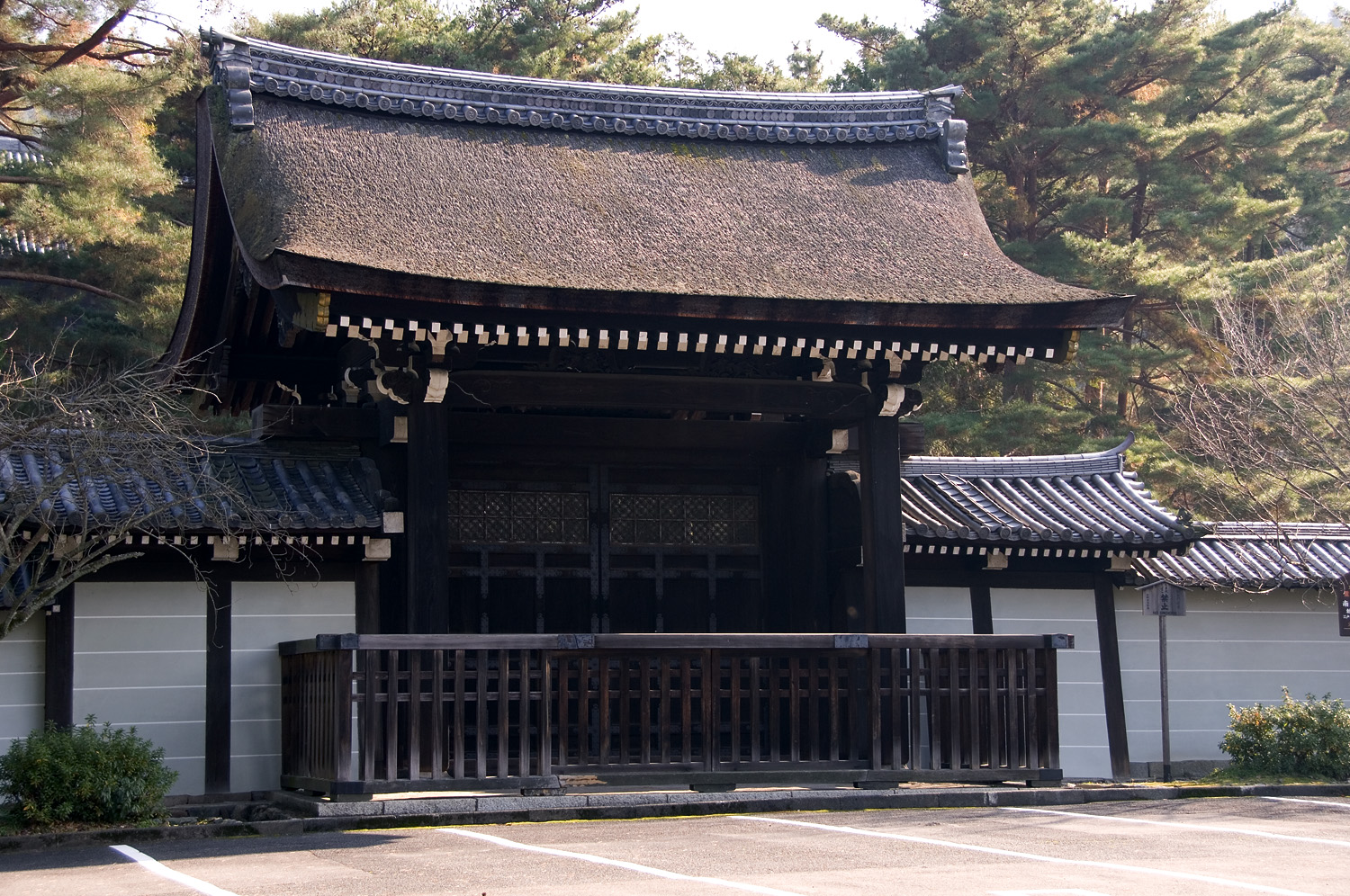
Chokushimon Gate (勅使門) of Nanzen-ji, originally the Hino-mikomon Gate (日ノ御門) of former palace.

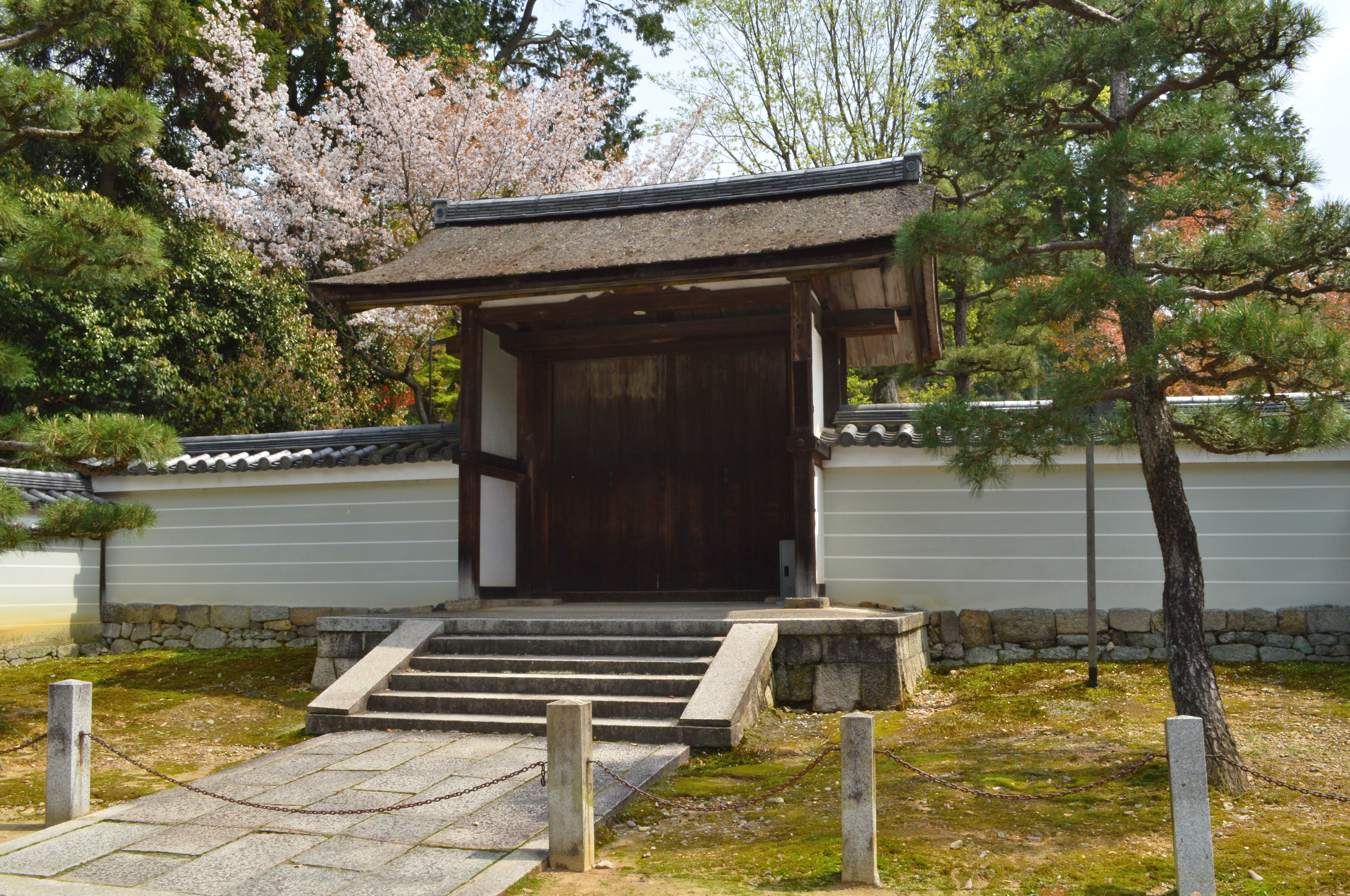
Gekkamon gate (月下門) of Tōfuku-ji, originally Gekkamon gate (月華門) of Imperial Palace built in 1246 as the main gate of Fumon-in temple, moved to current location in 1268.

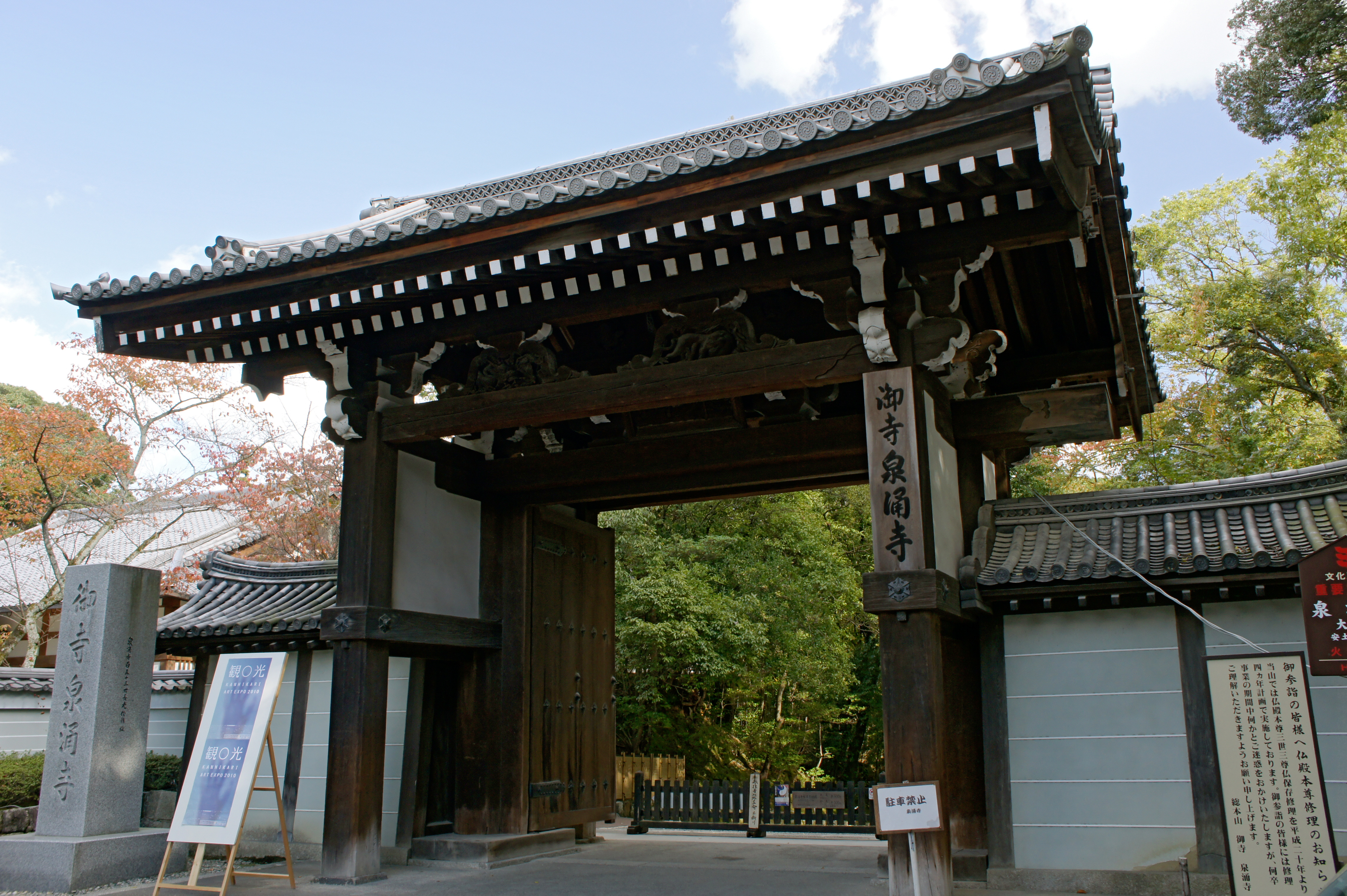
Sennyū-ji Daimon gate,formerly the gate of imperial palace.

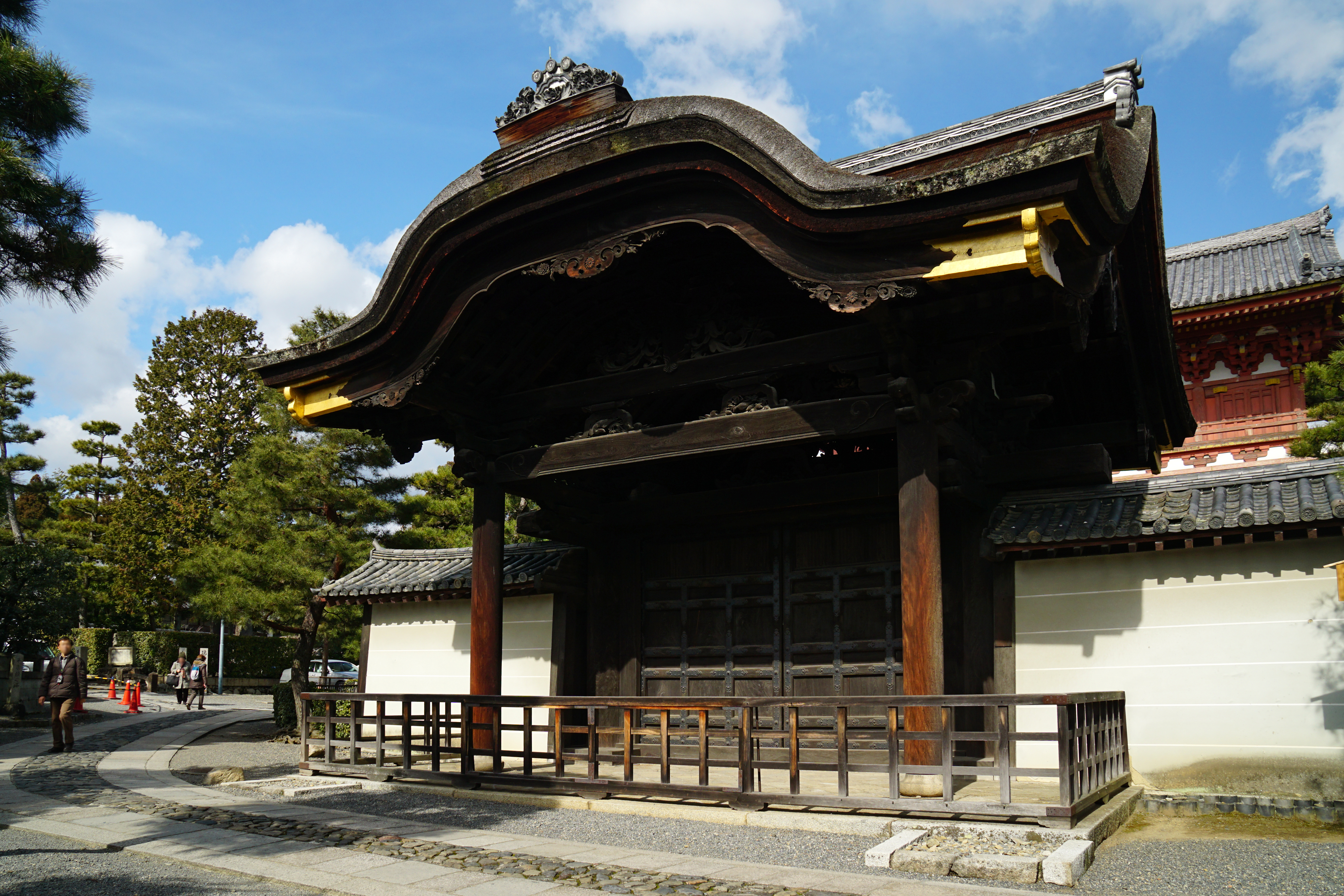
Chokushimon Gate (勅使門) of Daitoku-ji temple, formerly the south gate of the Imperial Palace.

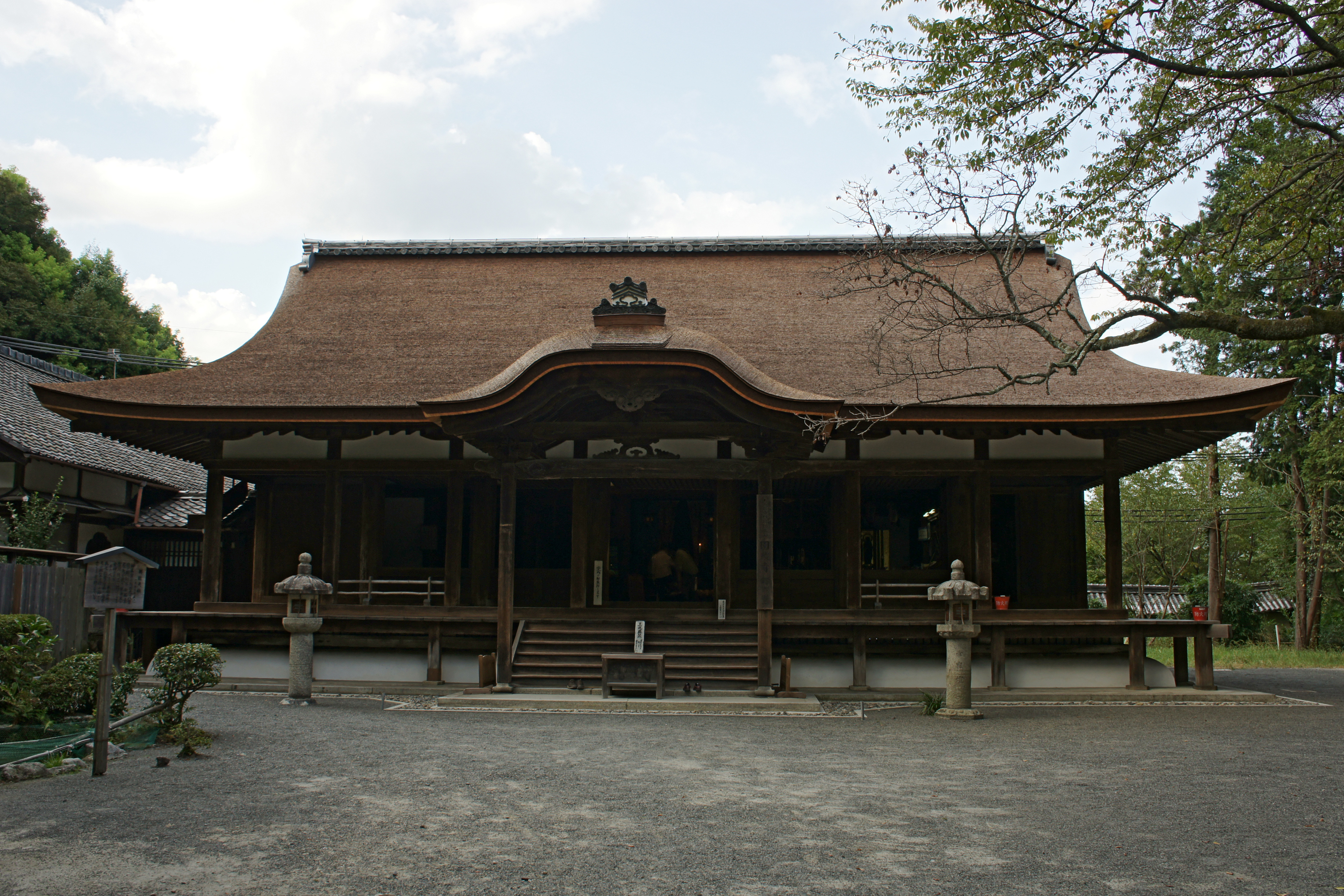
Shakado hall (釈迦堂) of Mii-dera temple was originally Seiryoden (清涼殿) hall built in the mid-Muromachi period, it was relocated after Toyotomi Hideyoshi destroyed the Mii-dera.

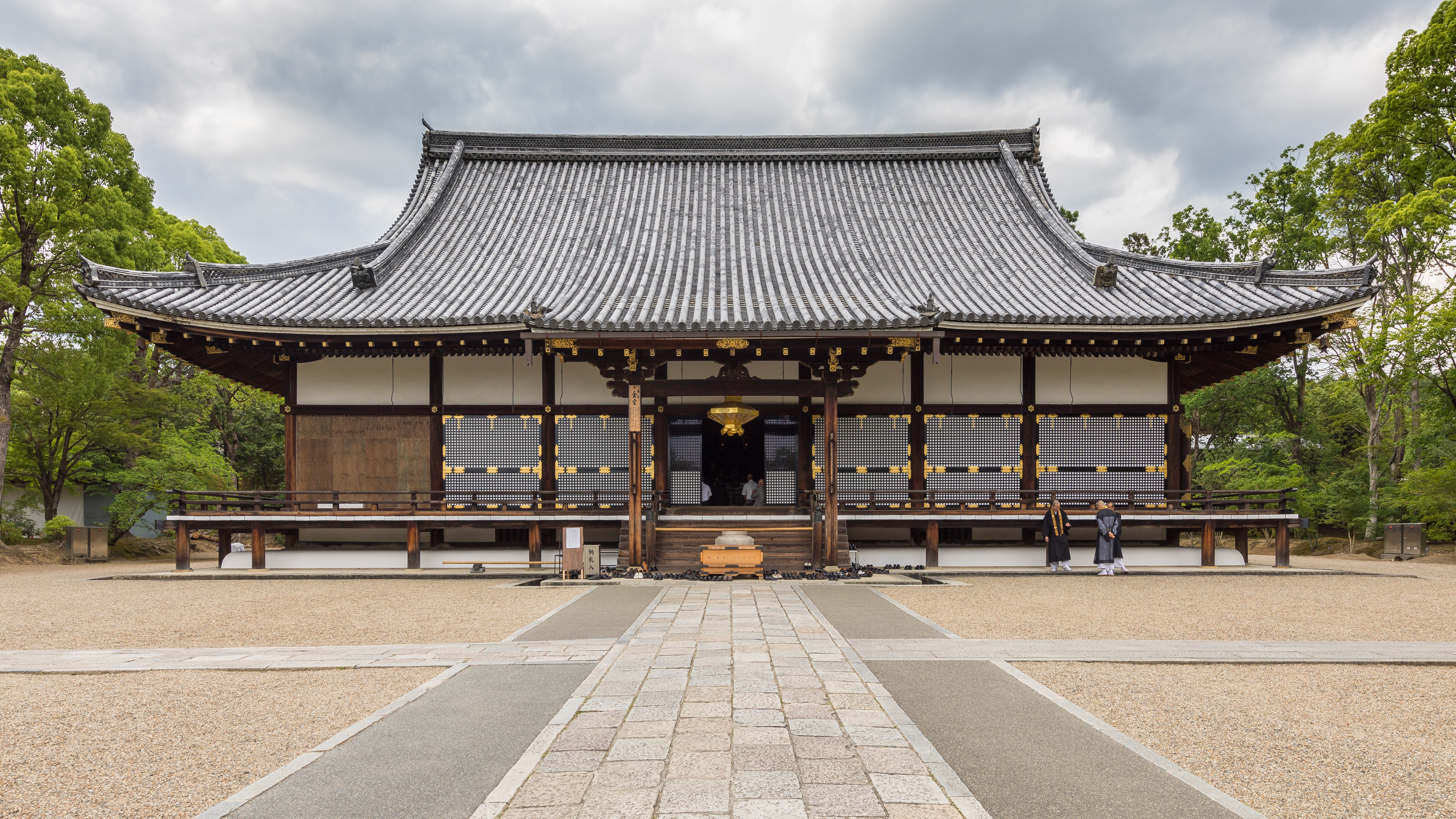
Main Hall of Ninna-ji temple is The oldest surviving Shishinden throne hall, relocated to current position during the Kan'ei period by donation of Emperor Go-Mizunoo.

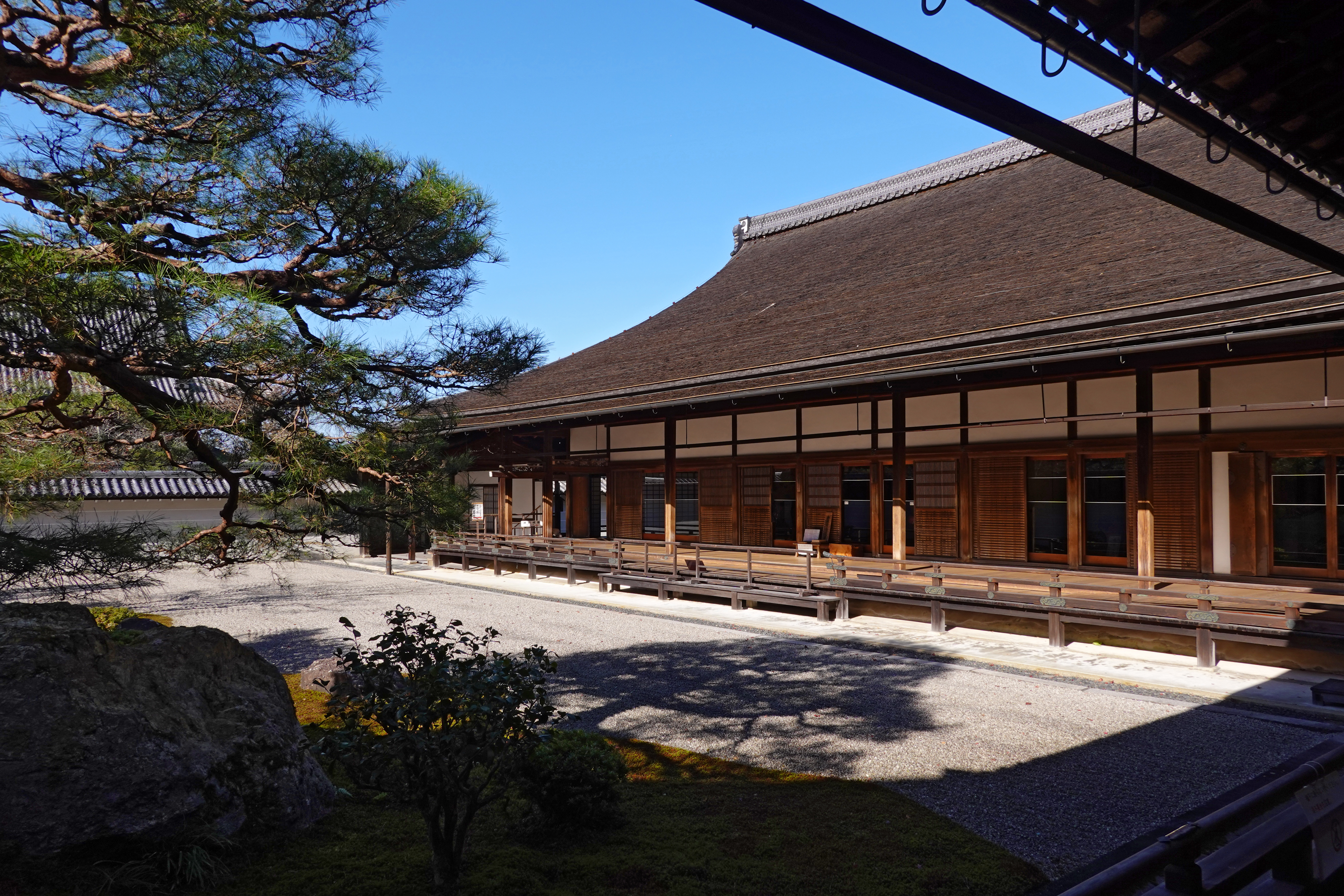
The hōjō (abbot's quarters) of Nanzen-ji. While many sources claim that the Seiryoden (清涼殿) hall from the Imperial Palace was relocated, it was actually the opposite palace from the Empress's Palace, built in Tensho era (1573-1591) and moved to current location in 1611 by donation of Emperor Go-Yōzei.

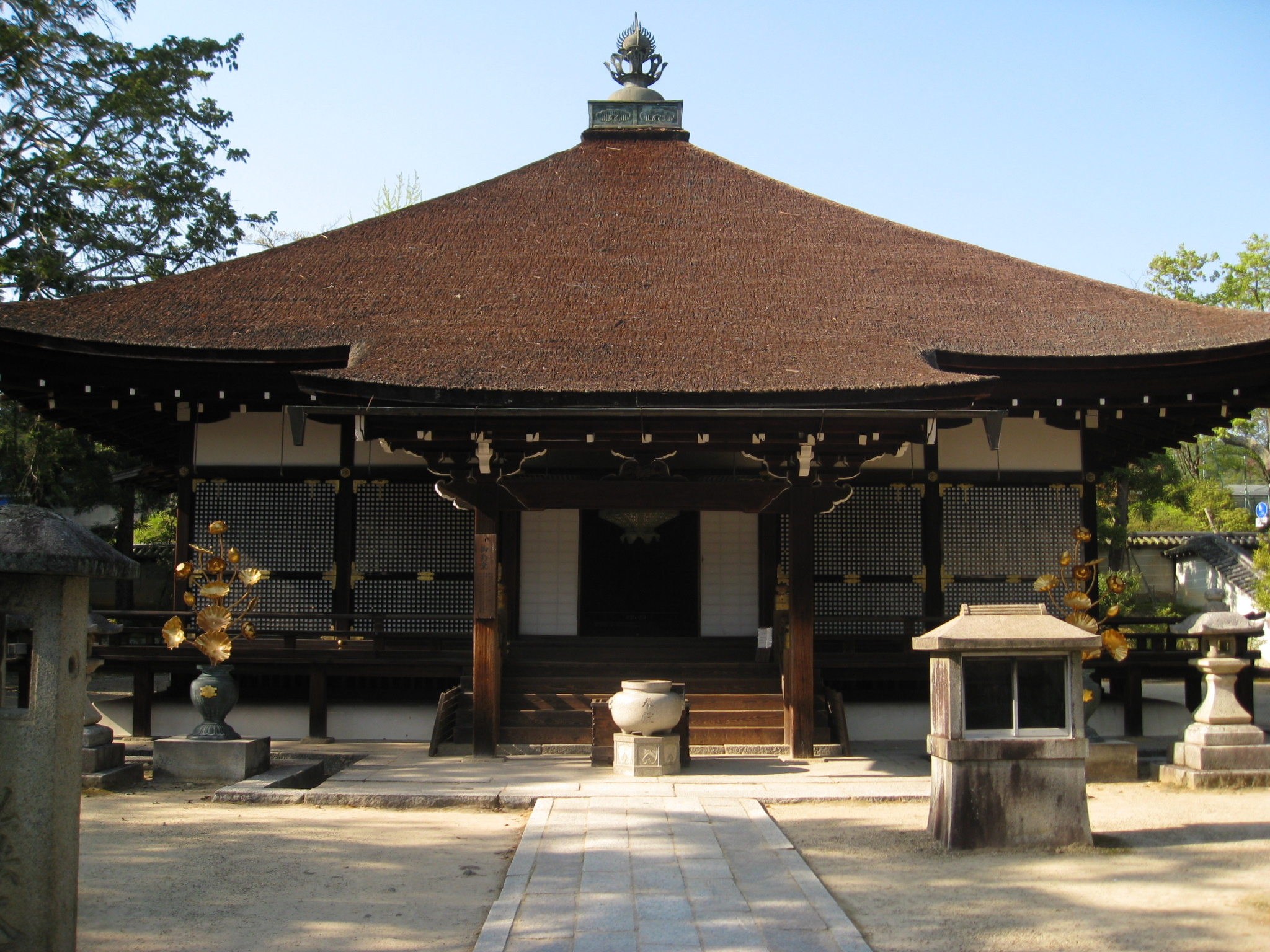
Goei-do Hall of Ninna-ji, used as part of Seiryoden (清涼殿), relocated to current position during the Kan'ei period by donation of Emperor Go-Mizunoo.

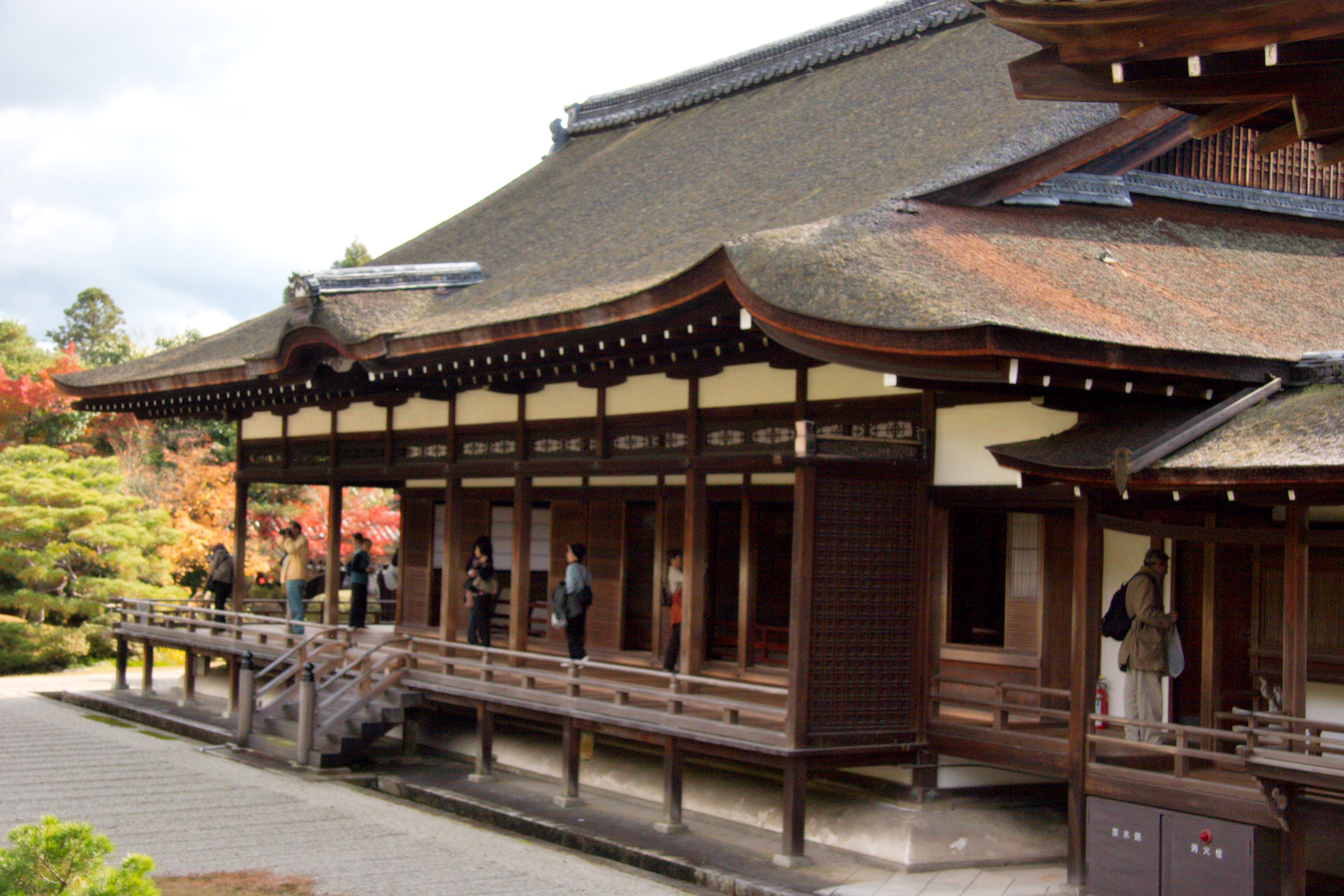
Shinden (宸殿) of Ninna-ji was the Otsunegoten (Emperor's residence), relocated during the Kan'ei period but the original building was destroyed by fire during the Meiji period.

== Gallery ==
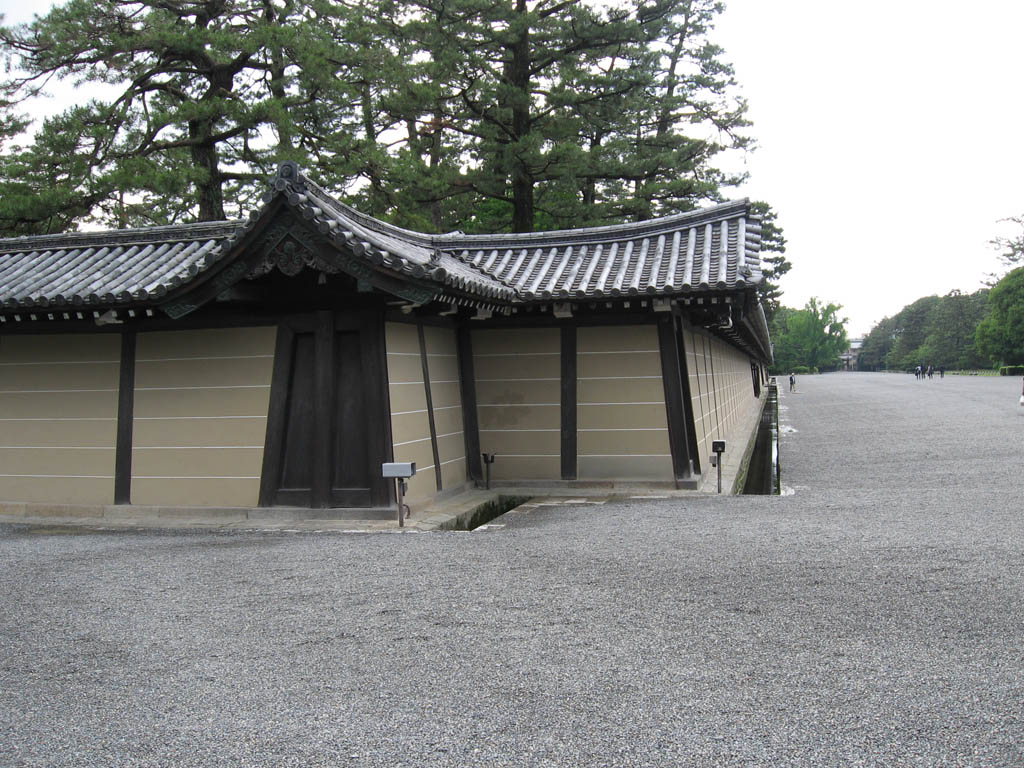
The Sarugatsuji

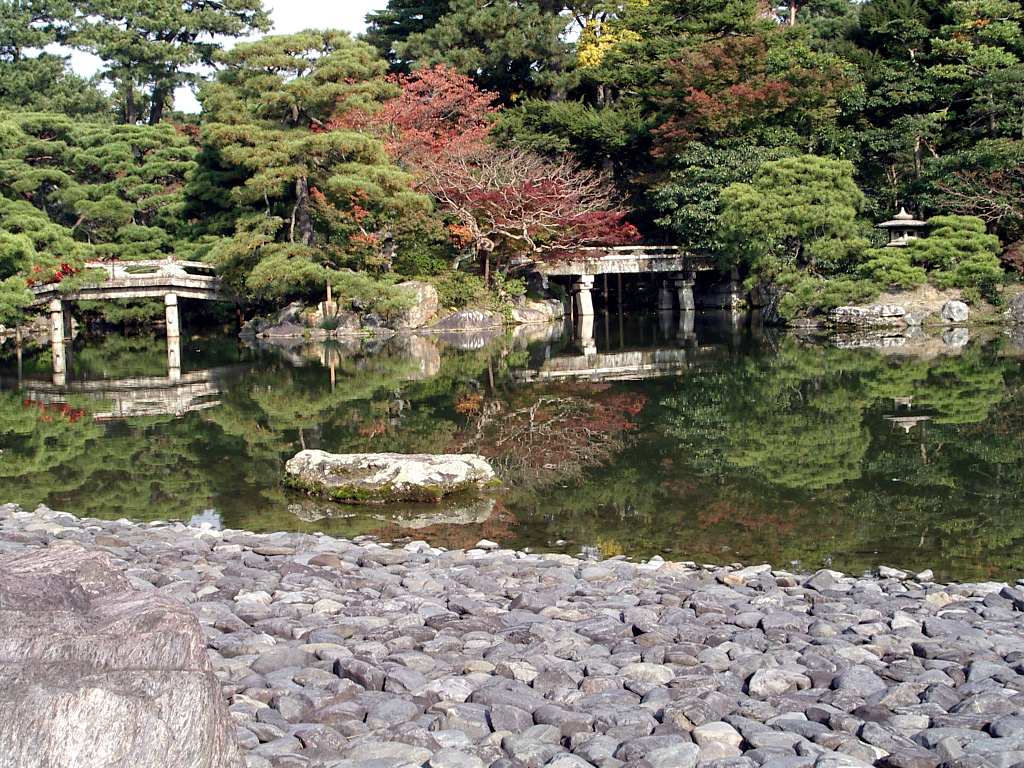
Oike-niwa (御池庭) garden and pond

== See also ==
- Kyoto Gyoen National Garden
