= Daidairi =

Daidairi (大内裏, also pronounced taidairi) refers to the greater palace or outer palace precincts of a Japanese palace. In particular, it usually refers to these regions of:

- Heijō Palace in present-day Nara
- Heian Palace in present-day Kyoto
