= Tōin Kinkata =

Tōin Kinkata (洞院公賢) (1291 – 1360) was a member of the Court during the late Kamakura period and early Nanboku-chō period in Japanese history. As a writer, Kinkata was the author of the diary Entairyaku (園太暦), where he reviewed the events of the imperial court in 1311 and between 1344 and 1360.

Kintaka was also the author of the Gyorogushō (魚魯愚鈔), a courtly technical document and co-authored the chronicle Kōdaireki (皇代暦), which summarizes in five volumes the imperial events from mythological times to contemporary times and posthumously extended to the reign of Emperor Go-Tsuchimikado by Kanroji Chikanaga.

== Life ==
Kinkata was from Ramo Tōin of the Fujiwara clan. He was Sadaijin Tōin Saneyasu's son.

Kinkata served the following emperors: Fushimi (1294-1298); Go-Fushimi (1298-1301); Go-Nijo (1301-1308); Hanazono (1308-1318); Go-Daigo (1318-1339).

Kinkata entered the court in 1294 under Emperor Fushimi. In 1298, he was transferred to Emperor Go-Fushimi's Kurōdodokoro. Under Emperor Go-Nijo, he was appointed Sachūben (intermediate controller of Sadaijin's cabinet) between 1306 and 1308; later, under Emperor Hanazono, he was appointed Sadaiben (administrator of leftist ministries) and, in 1309, promoted to Sangi.

In 1310 he was named Chūnagon, and in 1314 he was promoted to Gondainagon (substitute Dainagon) in 1318. Between 1318 and 1326 during Emperor Go-Daigo's rule, he was named Tōgūbō (春宮 坊, tutor to the Crown Prince). That same year, he became the adopted father of Ano Yasuko, a consort of Go-Daigo. In 1325, he became effective as Dainagon.

Kinkata was named Naidaijin in 1330, but with the overthrow of Go-Daigo in 1331, he decided to resign. Only after the fall of the Kamakura Shogunate and the beginning of the Kenmu Restoration in 1333, in which Kinkata returns to assume administrative positions, occupying his former Naidaijin position. In 1335, he was promoted to Udaijin and collaborated with imperial prince Noriyoshi (future emperor Go-Murakami), but after his defeat at the hands of Ashikaga Takauji and the fall of the Kenmu Restoration, Kinkata swore allegiance to Hokuchō (northern court) and Emperor Kogon. As a result, he maintained his position as Udaijin until 1337. He was promoted to Sadaijin in 1343 (until 1346) and then to Daijō Daijin from 1348 to 1350. Kinkata became very skilled in the affairs of the Imperial Court and was a consultant to other nobles ( kuge) and even consultant to the emperor.

In 1351, he was appointed negotiator for the unification of the courts during the Kanno incident and achieved, though for a short time, the unification of Shohei, where Emperor Suko was deposed as a condition for unification. In 1353, just after the end of the reunification, Emperor Go-Kōgon (Emperor Suko's brother) ascends the throne and Kinkata fearing reprisals, flees to the province of Mino, from where he later joined (Nanchō) (Southern Court) in the next year. He abandoned his life at court and became a Buddhist monk (bhikkhu) in 1359, changing his name to Nakazono and died the following year.

He left two children, Toin Sanenatsu and Toin Saneyo, the last of whom became his heir.

== Sources ==
- Mori, Shigeaki. Kokushi Daijiten - Tōin Kinkata. Yoshikawa Kobunkan.
- Nihonshi Daijiten 5 - Tōin Kinkata. (Heibonsha, 1994, ISBN 4-582-13105-0)
- Kugyo Jinmei Daijiten (野島寿三郎編、Nichigai Associates, 1994, ISBN 4-8169-1244-4) pág. 509 "Tōin Kinkata".
- Dai Nihon Shiryō 第六編之二十三 延文五年四月六日条（卒伝）
- 『内乱のなかの貴族 南北朝と「園太暦」の世界』 (Tatsusaburo Hayashiya, 1991 Kadokawa Shoten, ISBN 4-04-703220-4)
- 『宮廷公家系図集覧』(近藤敏喬編、東京堂出版、1994)

| Preceded by Tōin Saneyasu | -- 4º Lord of Tōin Fujiwara | Succeeded by Tōin Sanenatsu |
| Preceded by Koga Nagamichi | Daijō Daijin (Nanchō) | Succeeded by Saionji Kinshige |
| Preceded by Koga Nagamichi | Daijō Daijin (Hokuchō) | Succeeded by Koga Michimasa |
| Preceded by Kujō Michinori | Sadaijin (Hokuchō) | Succeeded by Nijō Yoshimoto |
| Preceded by Takatsukasa Fuyunori | Udaijin; Hokuchō (1336) | Succeeded by Kujō Michinori (Hokuchō); Nijō Moromoto (Nanchō) |
| Preceded by Nakanoin Michiaki (Hokuchō) | Naidaijin | Succeeded by Yoshida Sadafusa |
| Preceded by Koga Nagamichi | Naidaijin | Succeeded by Ōmiya Suehira (Hokuchō) |
