= Heian Palace =

Original imperial palace of Heian-kyō, the capital of Japan

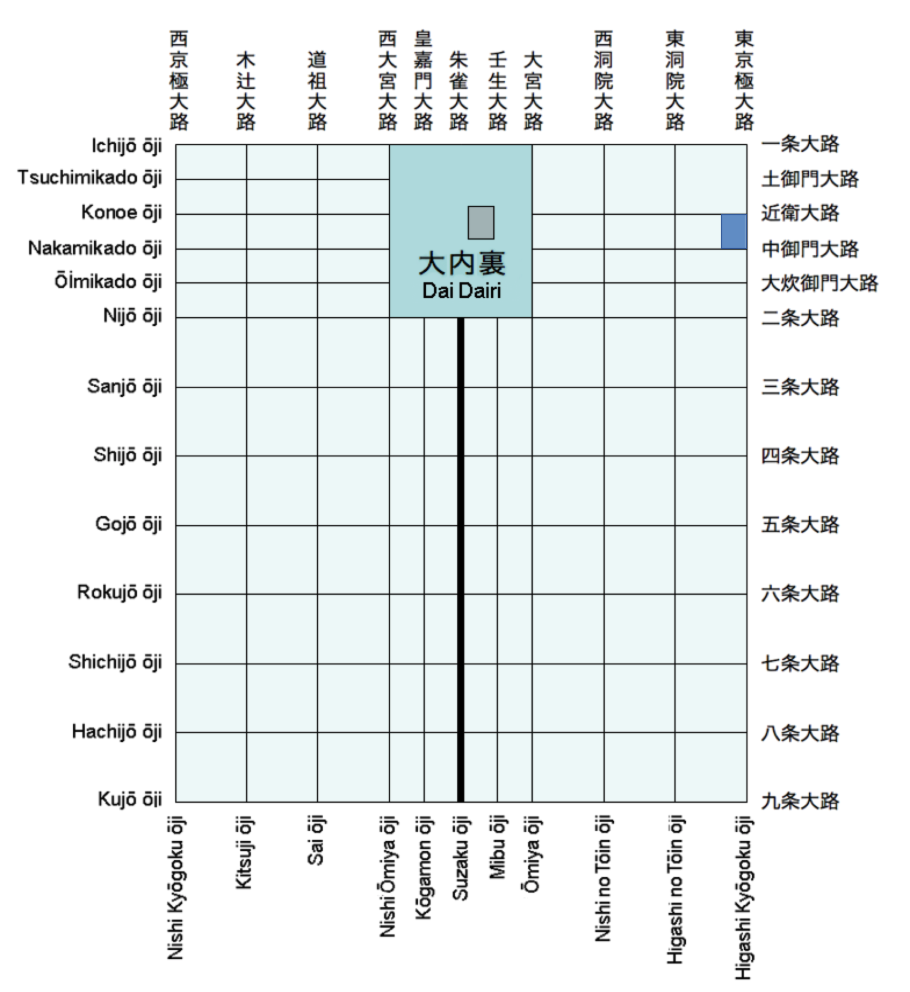
Schematic map of Heian-kyō showing the location of the palace as well as the Tsuchimikado temporary palace that developed into the current Kyoto Imperial Palace (blue in upper right-hand corner)

The Heian Palace (平安宮, Heian-kyū) was the original imperial palace of Heian-kyō (present-day Kyoto), then the capital of Japan. Both the palace and the city were constructed in the late 700s and were patterned on Chinese models and designs. The palace served as the imperial residence and the administrative centre for most of the Heian period (794–1185).

Located in the north-central section of the city, the palace consisted of a large, walled, rectangular Greater Palace (the Daidairi), which contained several ceremonial and administrative buildings including the government ministries. Inside this enclosure was the separately walled residential compound of the emperor, or the Inner Palace (Dairi). In addition to the emperor's living quarters, the Inner Palace contained the residences of the imperial consorts and buildings more closely linked to the person of the emperor.

The original role of the palace was to manifest the centralised government model adopted by Japan from China in the 7th century – known as the ritsuryō system, where the bureaucracy under the emperor was headed by the great council of state (Daijō-kan) and its subsidiary Eight Ministries. The palace was designed to provide an appropriate setting for the emperor's residence, the conduct of great affairs of state, and the accompanying ceremonies. While the residential function of the palace continued until the 12th century, the facilities built for grand state ceremonies began to fall into disuse by the 9th century. This was due to both the abandonment of several statutory ceremonies and procedures and the transfer of several remaining ceremonies into the smaller-scale setting of the Inner Palace.

From the mid-Heian period, the palace suffered several fires and other disasters. During reconstructions, emperors and some of the office functions resided outside the palace. This, along with the general loss of political power of the court, acted to further diminish the importance of the palace as the administrative centre. In 1227 the palace burned down and was never rebuilt. The site was built over so that almost no trace of it remains. Knowledge of the palace is thus based on contemporary literary sources, surviving diagrams and paintings, and limited excavations.

== Location ==
The palace was located at the northern centre of the rectangular city Heian-kyō, following the Chinese model of the Tang dynasty capital of Chang'an. The model had been adopted already for the Heijō Palace in the earlier capital Heijō-kyō (in present-day Nara) and the short-lived interim capital of Nagaoka-kyō.

The main entrance to the palace was the gate Suzakumon (35°0′49″N 135°44′32″E), which formed the northern terminus of the great Suzaku Avenue, which ran through the centre of the city from the gate Rashōmon. The palace thus faced south and presided over the symmetrical urban plan of Heian-kyō. In addition to the Suzakumon, the palace had 13 other gates located symmetrically along the side walls. A major avenue led to each of the gates, except for the three along the northern side of the palace, which was coterminous with the northern boundary of the city.

The south-eastern corner of the Greater Palace was located in the middle of the present-day Nijō Castle.

== History ==
=== Early history ===
Less than ten years after a presumably politically motivated move of the capital from Heijō-kyō (平城京) (on the site of present-day Nara) to Nagaoka-kyō (長岡京) (approx. 10 kilometers to the south-west of Kyoto), Emperor Kanmu decided to move the capital again, likely due to frequent flooding of the Nagaoka-kyō site. In 794 the court moved into this new capital of Heian-kyō, where it was to stay for more than 1000 years. The palace was the first and most important structure to be erected at the new capital, but it was not completely ready by the time of the move; the Great Audience Hall (大極殿, Daigokuden) was completed in 795, and the government office in charge of its construction was disbanded in 805, though work on the place was still incomplete. Construction of the palace and imperial family residences was a major expenditure for Kanmu's administration, accounting for the majority of revenues gathered during his reign, according to a 10th-century source. The powerful immigrant Hata family may have influenced and financially supported the decision to move the capital to Heian-kyō, closer to its power base. Later sources claim that the new imperial residence occupied the site of a former Hata leader's residence.

Two of the most important official sections of the palace complex, the grand Chinese-style Official Compound (朝堂院, Chōdō-in) and Reception Compound (豊楽院, Buraku-in), started to fall into disuse quite early on. This paralleled the decline of the elaborate Chinese-inspired ritsuryō government processes and bureaucracy, many of which were gradually either abandoned or reduced to empty forms while de facto decision making moved into the hands of most powerful families (in particular the Fujiwara) and new extralegal offices (such as Chamberlain's Office (蔵人所, Kurōdodokoro), see below). Partly as the consequence of these developments the real administrative centre of the complex moved gradually to the emperors residential Inner Palace, or Dairi.

As activity was concentrated in the Dairi, other sections of the Greater Palace began to be regarded as increasingly unsafe, especially by night. One reason may be the prevalent superstition of the period: uninhabited buildings were avoided for fear of spirits and ghosts, and even the great Buraku-in compound was thought to be haunted. In addition, the level of security maintained at the palace went into decline, and by the early 11th century only one palace gate, the Yōmeimon in the east, appears to have been guarded. Hence burglary and even violent crime became a problem within the palace by the first half of 11th century.

=== Decreasing use ===
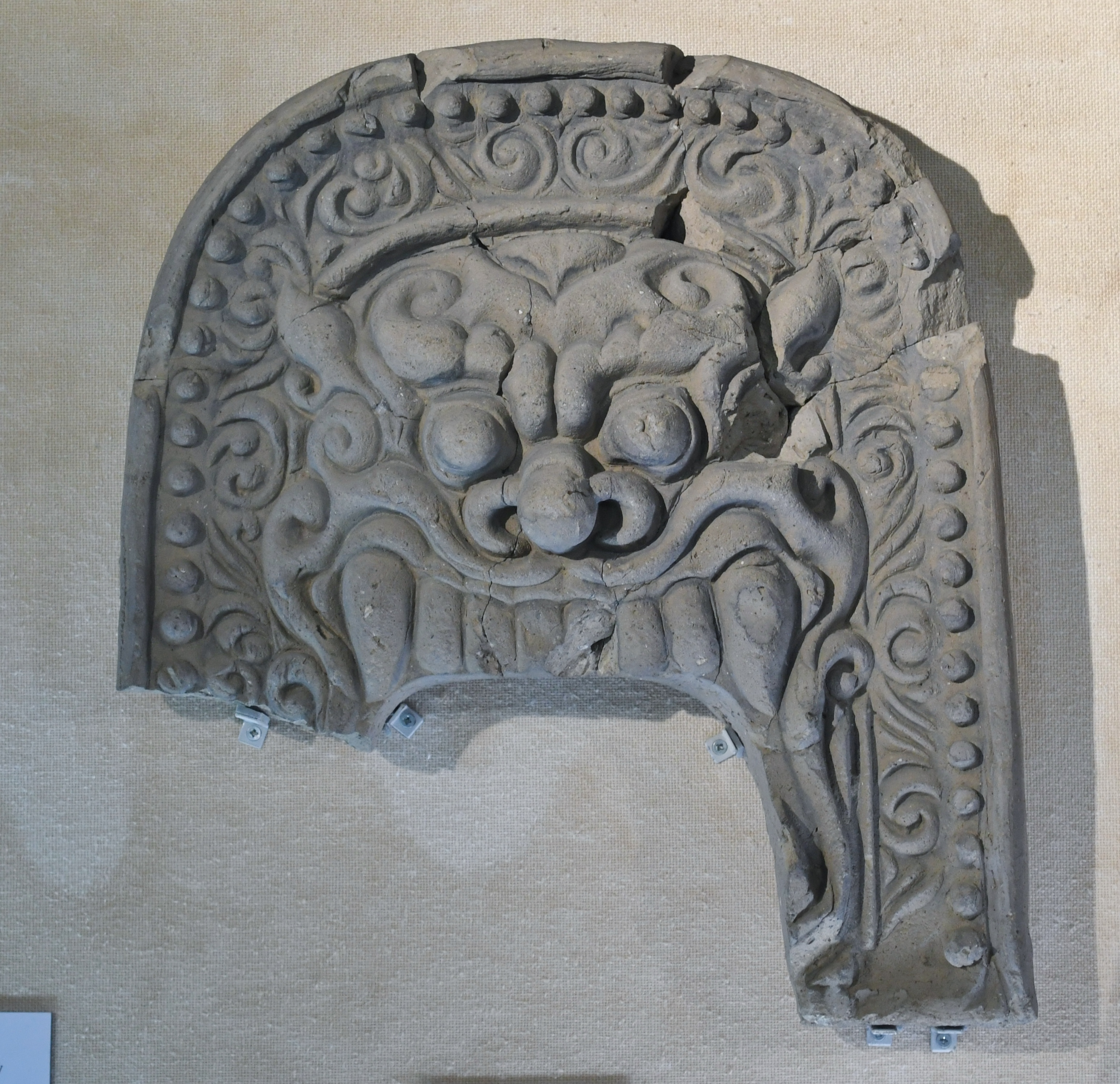
Onigawara roof tile from the ruins of Buraku-in

Fires were a constant problem as the palace compound was constructed almost entirely of wood. The Buraku-in was destroyed by a fire in 1063 and was never rebuilt. The Daigokuden was reconstructed after fires in 876, 1068 and in 1156 despite its limited use. After the major fire of 1177 destroyed much of the Greater Palace, the Daigokuden was never rebuilt.

Starting in 960, the Dairi was also repeatedly destroyed by fires, but it was always rebuilt, and it continued to be used as the official imperial residence until the late 12th century. According to historian William H. McCullough, the Dairi fires were frequent enough that arson is "generally assumed". During the periods of rebuilding, the emperors frequently had to stay at their secondary palaces (里内裏, sato-dairi) within the city. Often these secondary palaces were provided by the powerful Fujiwara family, which especially in the latter part of the Heian period exercised de facto control of politics by providing consorts to successive emperors. Thus the residences of the emperors' maternal grandparents started to usurp the residential role of the palace even before the end of the Heian period. The institution of rule by retired emperors, or the insei system (cloistered rule (院政)), from 1086 further added to the declining importance of the palace, as retired emperors exercised power from their own residential palaces inside and outside the city.

=== Late history ===
In the aftermath of the 1156 Hōgen rebellion, Emperor Go-Shirakawa ordered the rebuilding of portions of the palace as part of an effort to reclaim more power to the emperor and restart some ceremonial practices. Go-Shirakawa soon abdicated in favor of his son, Emperor Nijo, and both were attacked and held captive in the palace during the Heiji rebellion. They escaped a few weeks later, and forces loyal to them retook the palace and ended the rebellion.

After a fire in 1177, the original palace complex was abandoned and emperors resided in smaller palaces (the former sato-dairi) within the city and villas outside it. In 1227 a fire destroyed what remained of the Dairi, and the old Greater Palace went into essentially complete disuse. In 1334 Emperor Go-Daigo issued an edict to rebuild the Greater Palace, but no resources were available to support this and the project was not completed.

Though the Heian palace fell into total disuse, Heian-kyō remained the capital until 1868, with the name Kyoto (meaning capital city) applied to it starting in the eleventh century. The present Kyoto Imperial Palace is located immediately to the west of the site of the Tsuchimikado Mansion (土御門殿, Tsuchimikadodono), the Fujiwara residence in the north-eastern corner of the city that increasingly functioned as a temporary imperial residence and eventually developed into a new permanent palace. The ruined site of Jingi-kan (the government department responsible for worship of the native kami) is the longest-surviving known part of the Heian palace and apparently remained in some use until 1585.

== Primary sources ==
While the palace itself has been completely destroyed, a significant amount of information regarding it has been obtained from contemporary and almost contemporary sources. The Heian Palace figures as a setting in many Heian period literary texts, both fiction and non-fiction. These provide important information on the palace itself, court ceremonies and functions held there and everyday routines of the courtiers living or working there. Notable examples include the Tale of Genji by Murasaki Shikibu, the so-called Pillow Book by Sei Shōnagon and the chronicles Eiga Monogatari and Ōkagami. In addition, paintings in certain emakimono picture scrolls depict (sometimes fictional) scenes that took place at the palace and similar aristocratic dwellings; the Genji Monogatari Emaki, dating from about 1130, is perhaps the best-known example. There are also partially damaged maps of the palace from the 10th and 12th centuries showing the layout and function of the buildings within the Dairi. Modern archaeological study of the palace site has been hampered by the development of urban Kyoto over the palace ground ruins, but a few parts have been excavated, including the Burakuden.

== Greater Palace (Daidairi) ==
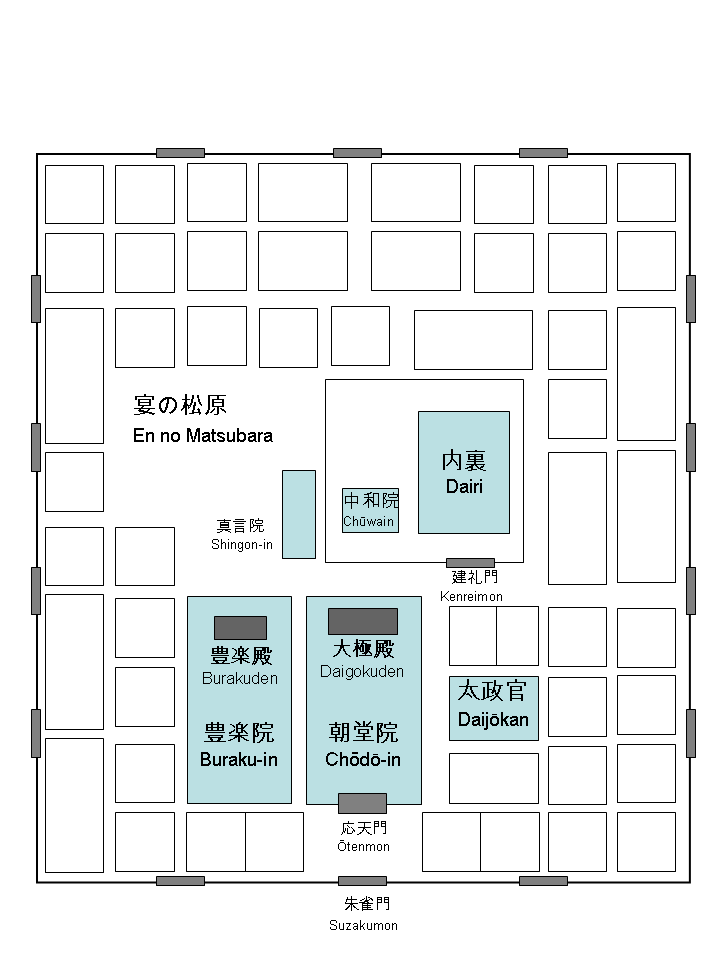
Schematic plan of the Greater Palace

The Daidairi (大内裏) was a walled rectangular area extending approximately 1.4 kilometres (0.87 mi) from north to south between the first and second major east–west avenues Ichijō ōji (一条大路) and Nijō ōji (二条大路) and 1.2 kilometres (0.75 mi) from west to east between the Nishi Ōmiya ōji (西大宮大路) and Ōmiya ōji (大宮大路) north-south avenues. The three main structures within the Greater Palace were the Official Compound (朝堂院, Chōdō-in), the Reception Compound (豊楽院, Buraku-in) and the Inner Palace (内裏, Dairi).

=== Chōdō-in ===
The Chōdō-in (朝堂院) was a rectangular walled enclosure situated directly to the north of the Suzakumon gate in the centre of the southern wall of the Greater Palace. It was based on Chinese models and followed Chinese architectural styles. Archaeological evidence from earlier capital palaces shows a generally stable design from the 7th century onwards. It was also called the Court of the Eight Ministries (八省院, Hasshō-in) as the corresponding compounds of the earlier Naniwa-kyō and Nagaoka-kyō palaces, which had eight halls in the central courtyard; however, as the Heian Palace compound had 12 halls, the traditional name was somewhat misleading, and the more accurate Court of the Twelve Halls (十二堂院, Jūnidō-in) was also used.

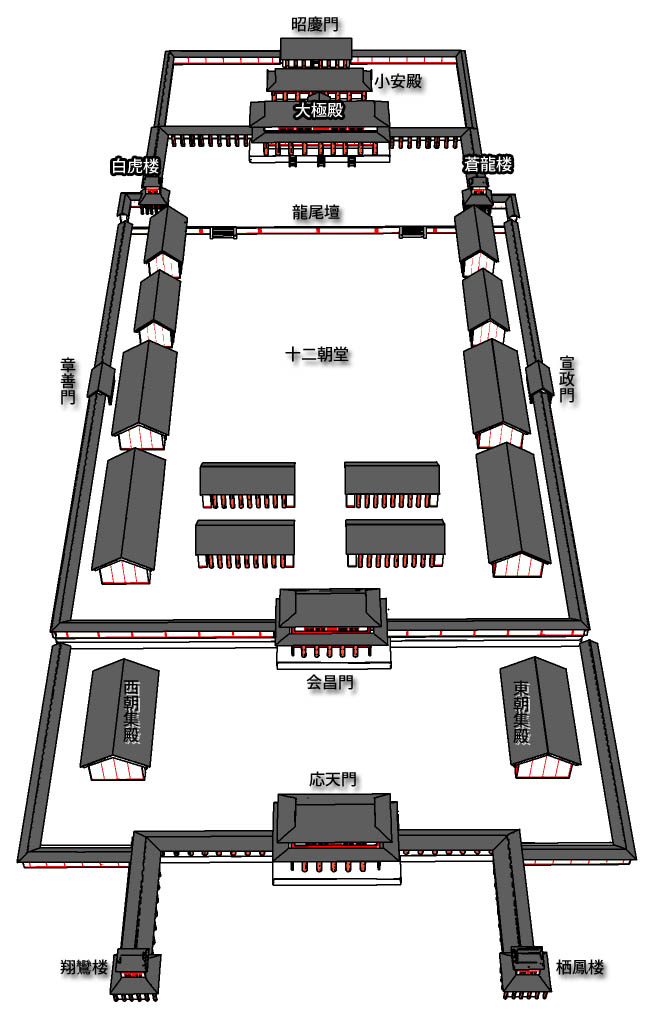
Plan of Chodo-in.

Originally the Chōdō-in was intended as the setting where the emperor was to preside over regular early morning deliberations on major state affairs by the bureaucracy, receive monthly reports from officials, hold New Year congratulations and receive foreign ambassadors. However, the practice of the morning deliberations ceased by 810 as did the monthly reports. Foreign ambassadors were no longer received for most of the Heian period, and the New Year celebrations were abbreviated and moved into the Dairi by the end of the 10th century, leaving the Accession Audiences (where the accession of a new emperor was proclaimed to the wider officialdom) and certain Buddhist ceremonials as the only ones held in the Chōdō-in.

==== Daigokuden ====
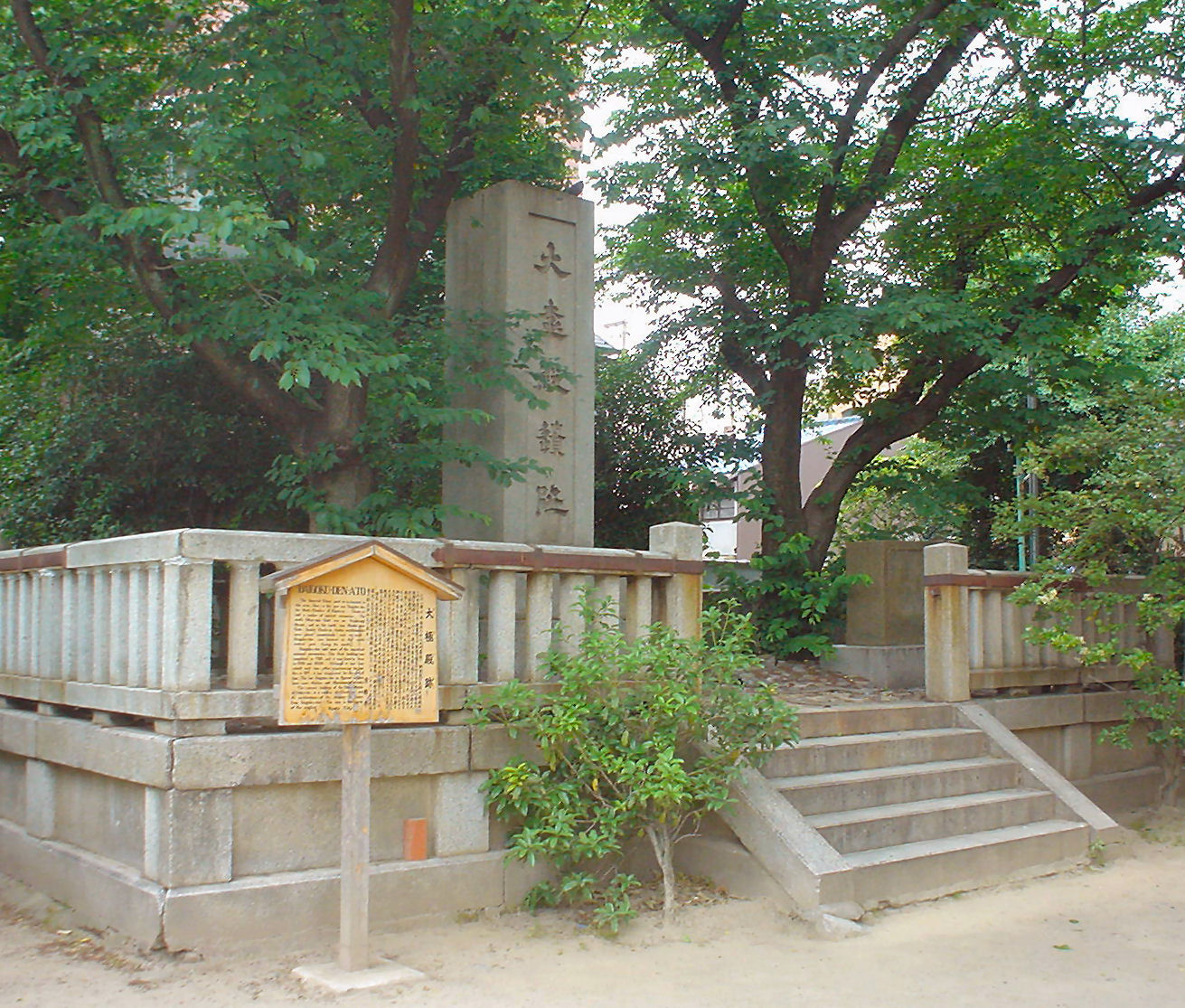
Memorial stone at the site of the Daigokuden hall of the palace

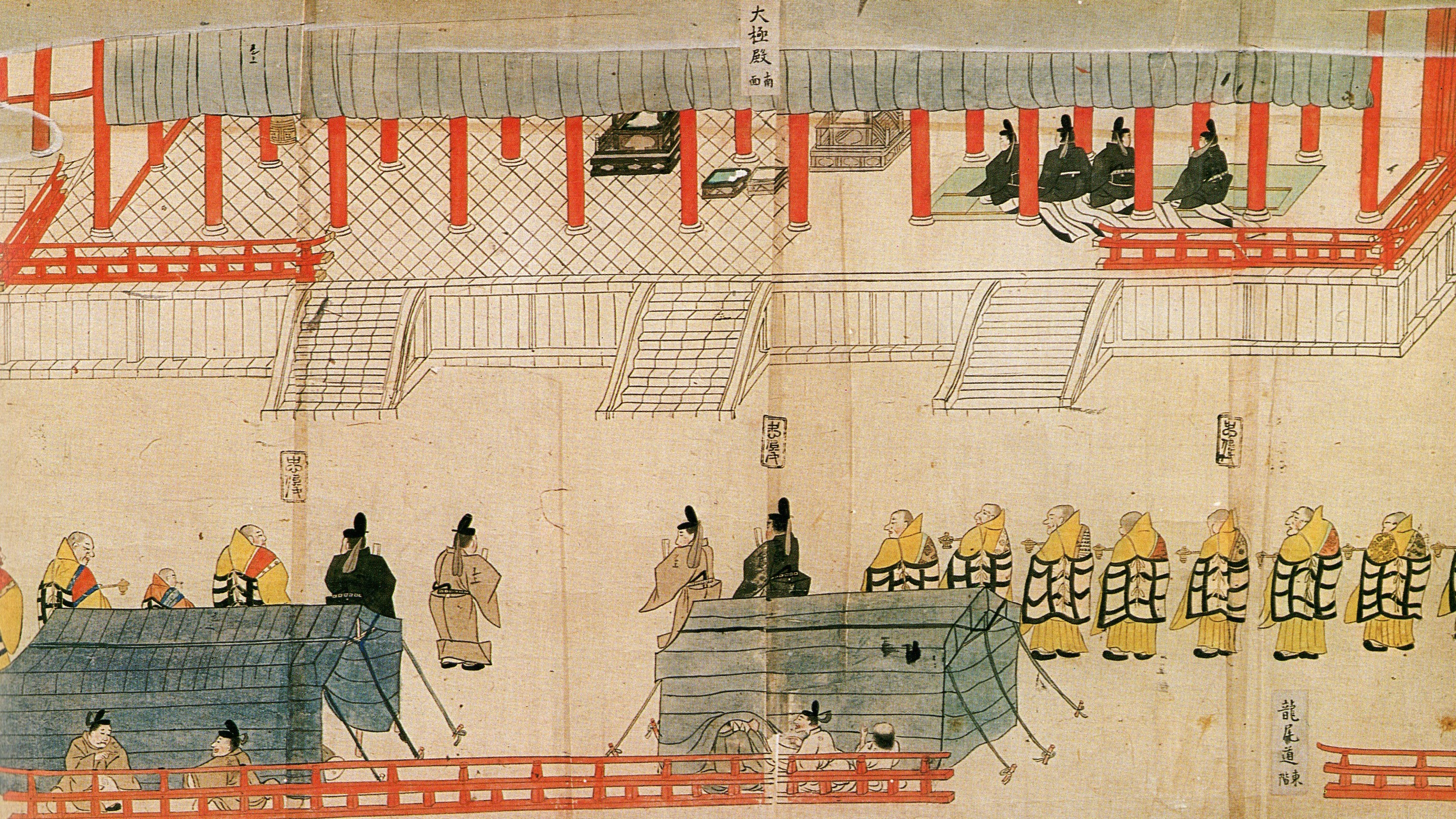
Painting of Buddhist New Year's event (御斎会) held at Daigokuden in late Heian period.

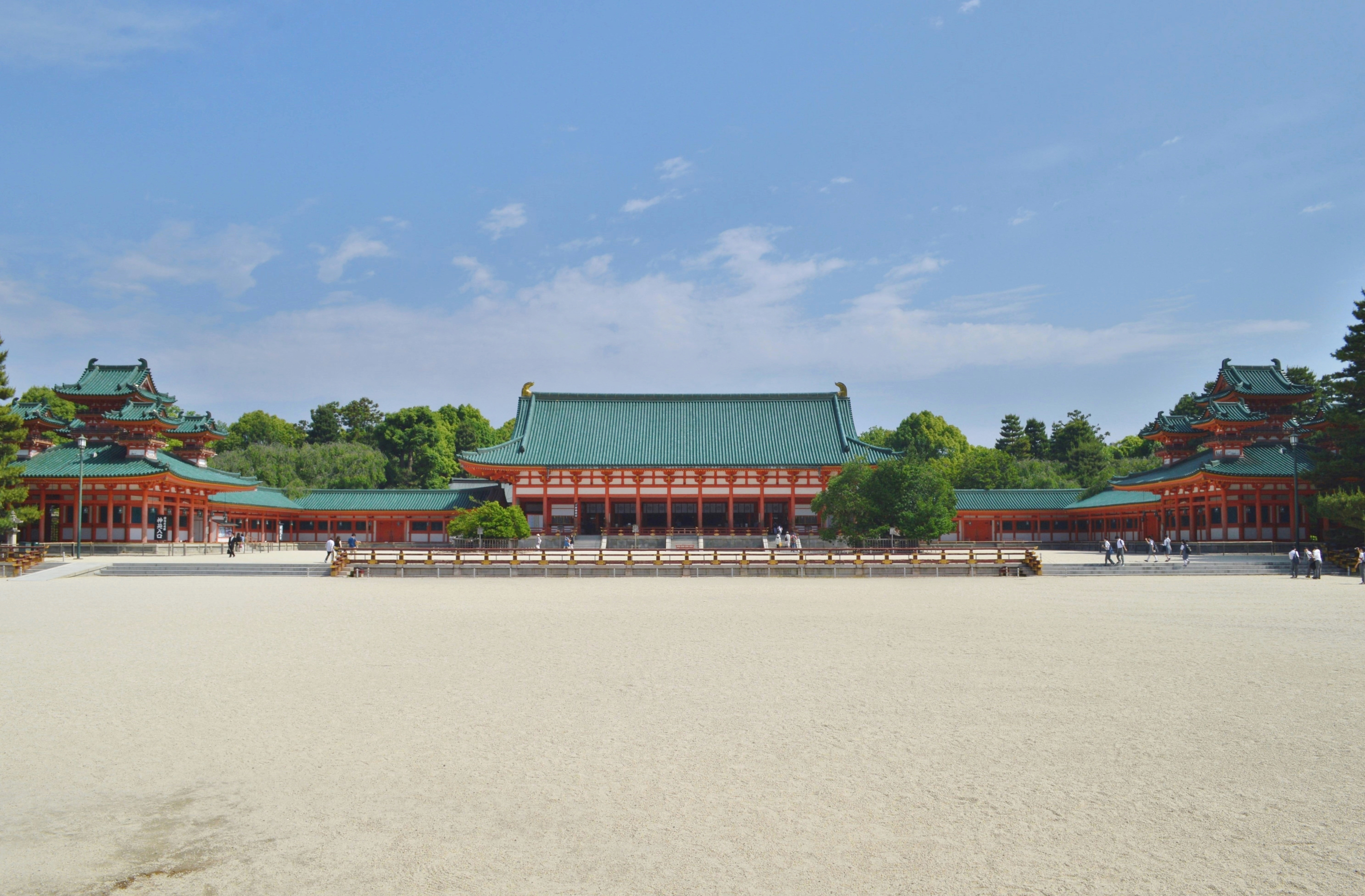
Daigokuden was rebuilt as main hall of Heian Shrine.

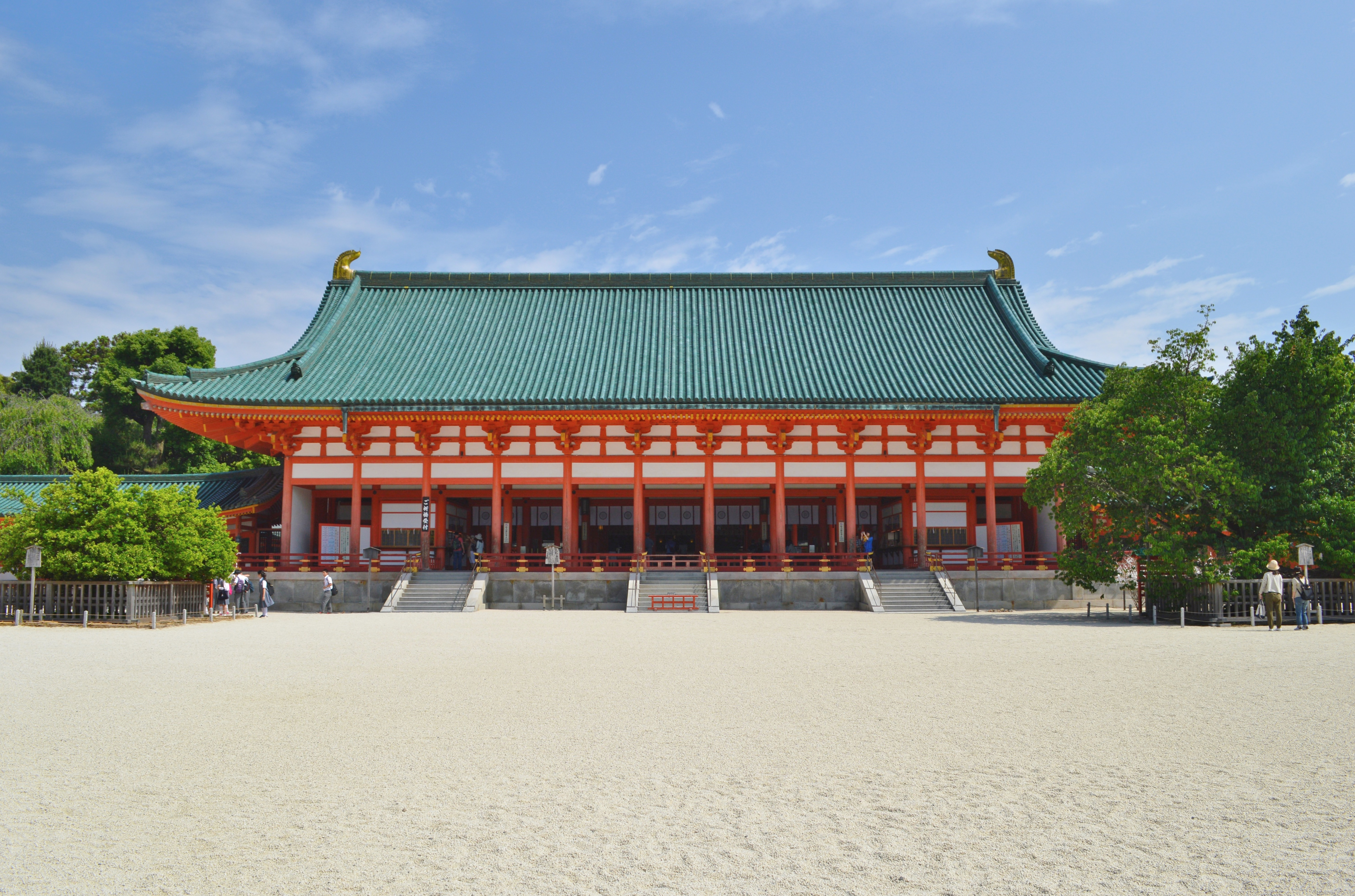
Daigokuden at Heian Shrine

The main building within the Chōdō-in was the Great Audience Hall (大極殿, Daigokuden), which faced south from the northern end of the compound. This was a large (approximately 52 m (170 ft) east to west and 20 m (65 ft) north to south) Chinese-style building with white walls, vermilion pillars and green tiled roofs, intended for most important state ceremonies and functions. The smaller southern section of the Chōdō-in consisted of waiting rooms for senior officials, while the largest middle section of the compound was occupied by a courtyard surrounded symmetrically by the Twelve Halls, where the bureaucracy assembled for court ceremonies and was seated according to strict order of precedence. The Heian Jingū shrine in Kyoto includes an apparently faithful reconstruction of the Daigokuden in somewhat reduced scale.

=== Buraku-in ===
The Buraku-in (豊楽院) was another large rectangular Chinese-style compound, situated to the west of the Chōdō-in. It was built for official celebrations and banquets and used also for other types of entertainment such as archery contests. Like the Chōdō-in, the Buraku-in had a hall at the central northern end of the enclosure overseeing the court. This hall, the Burakuden (豊楽殿, Hall of Abundant Pleasures), was used by the emperor and courtiers presiding over activities in the Buraku-in. The Buraku-in also fell gradually into disuse as many functions were moved to the Dairi. It was destroyed in at 1063 and not rebuilt. Unlike most of the palace, the Buraku-in site was subjected to some archaeological excavations in the twentieth century.

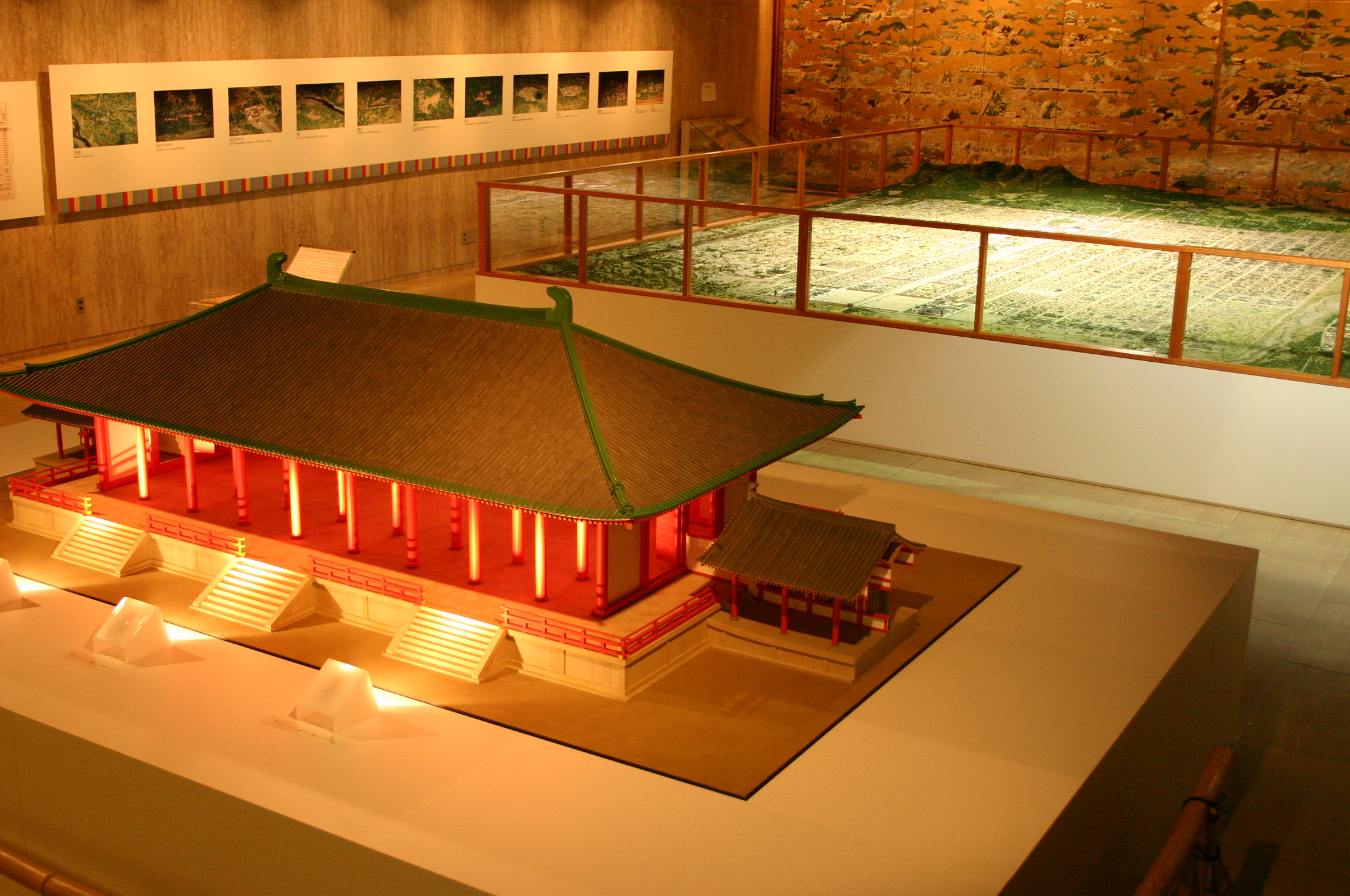
Burakuden (豊楽殿), the main building of Buraku-in in ratio (1:20).

=== Other Greater Palace buildings ===
Apart from the Inner Palace, the remaining area of the Greater Palace was occupied by ministries, lesser offices, workshops, storage buildings and the large open space of the Banqueting Pine Grove (宴の松原, En no Matsubara) to the west of the Dairi. The buildings of the Council of State (太政官, Daijōkan) were situated in a walled enclosure immediately to the east of the Chōdō-in, laid out in the typical symmetrical plan of buildings opening to a courtyard in the south. The Shingon-in (真言院, Shingon Chapel) was built right next to the Inner Palace and used for ceremonies held on the emperor's behalf. Apart from Tō-ji and Sai-ji, it was for long the only Buddhist establishment permitted within the capital. Permission to build it inside the palace, granted in 834, shows the influence of the Shingon sect during the early Heian Period.

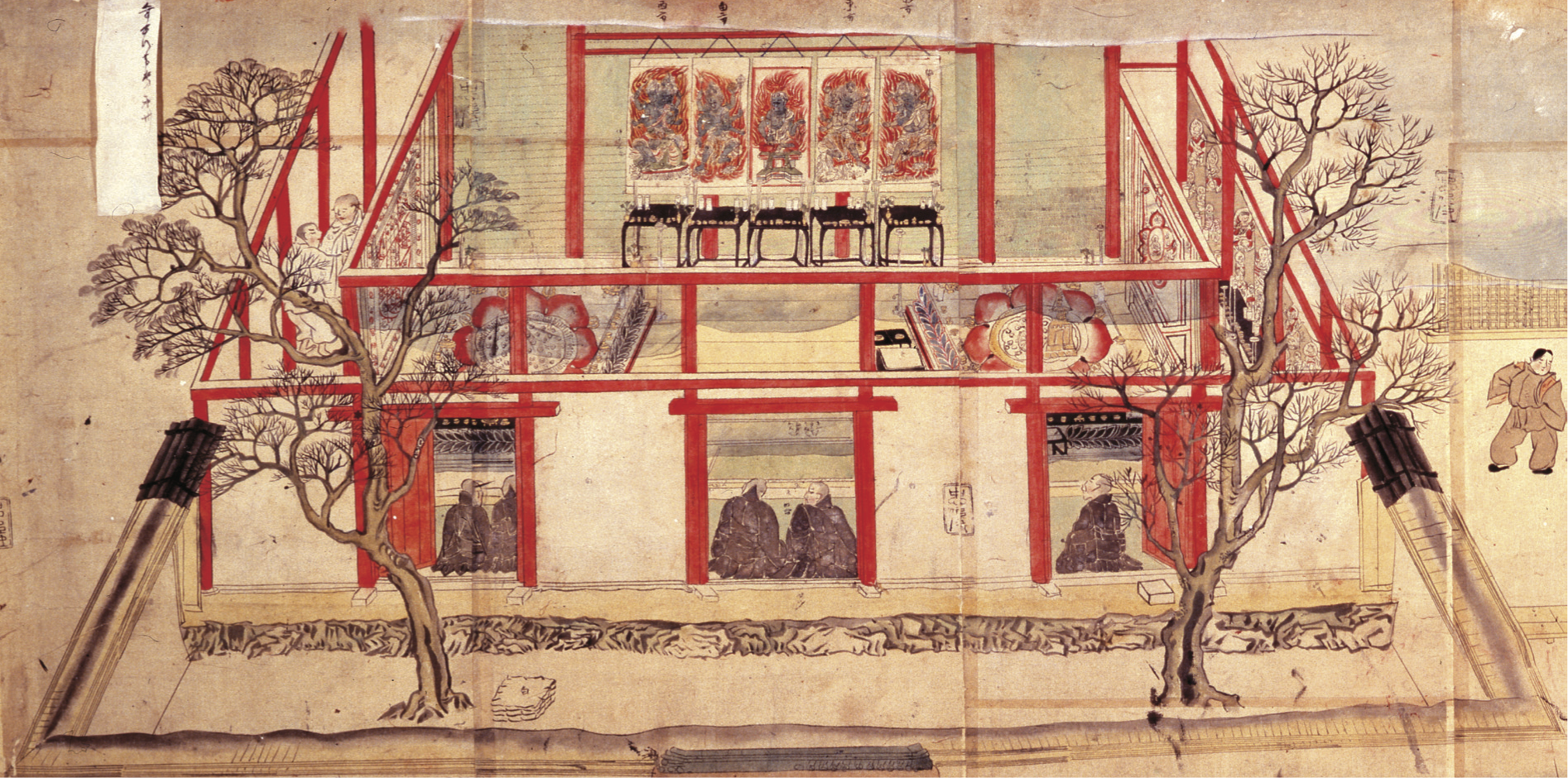
Painting of the Shingon-in (1636, copy of a c. 1160 work)

== Inner Palace (Dairi) ==
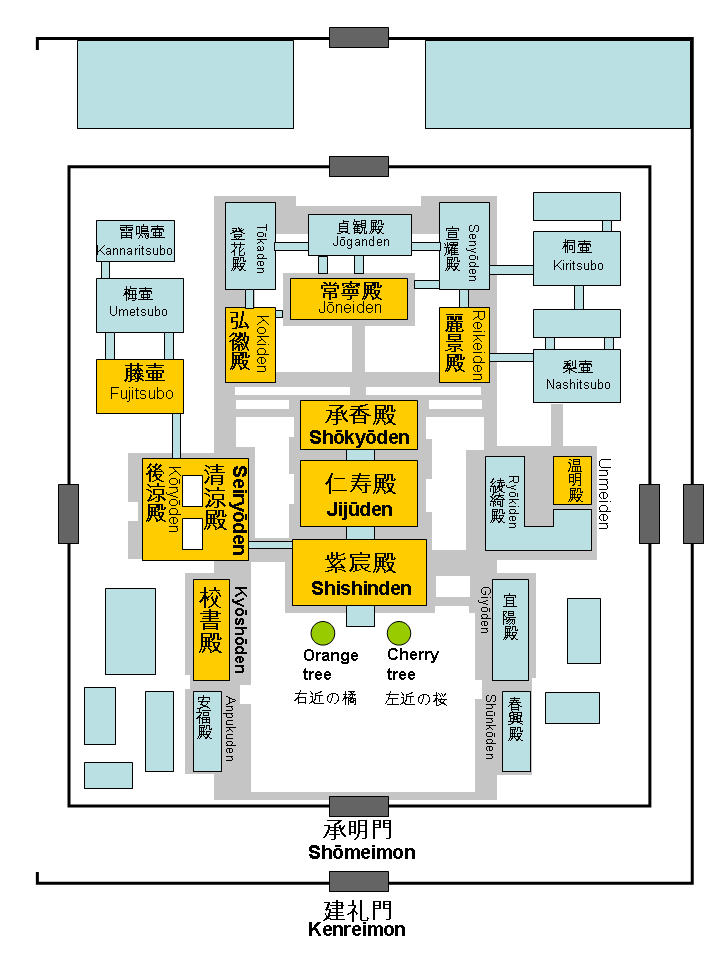
Schematic plan of the Inner Palace

The Dairi or Inner Palace (内裏), was located to the north-east of the Chōdō-in somewhat to the east of the central north-south axis of the Greater Palace. Its central feature was the Throne Hall. The Dairi encompassed the emperor's living quarters and the pavilions of the imperial consorts and ladies-in-waiting (collectively, the Kōkyū). It was enclosed within two sets of walls. In addition to the Dairi itself, the outer walls enclosed some household offices, storage areas, and the Chūwain (中和院)—a walled area of Shinto buildings associated with the emperor's religious functions, situated to the west of the Dairi itself, at the geographic centre of the Greater Palace. The formal entrance to the larger enclosure was the gate Kenreimon (建礼門), located directly south of the Dairi.

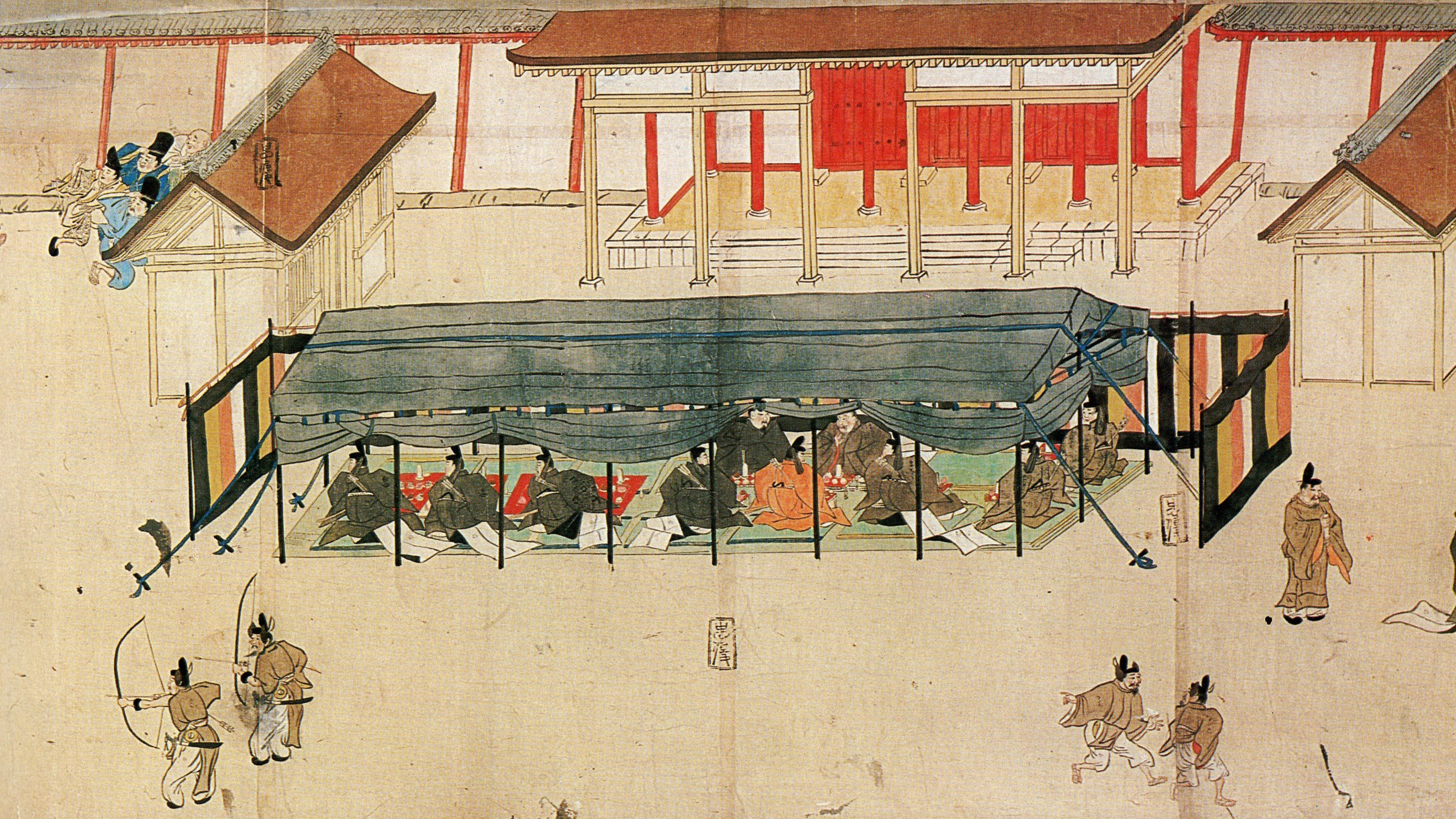
Archery competition (射遺) in front of Kenreimon (建礼門) gate in late Heian period.

The Dairi proper, the residential compound of the emperor, was enclosed within another set of walls to the east of the Chūwain. It measured approximately 215 m (710 ft) north to south and 170 m (560 ft) east to west. The main gate was the Shōmeimon gate (承明門) at the centre of the southern wall of the Dairi enclosure, immediately to the north of the Kenreimon gate. In contrast to the solemn, official, Chinese-style architecture of the Chōdō-in and the Buraku-in, the Dairi was built in a more intimate Japanese architectural style—though still on a grand scale. The Inner Palace represented a variant of the shinden-style architecture used in the aristocratic villas and houses of the period. The buildings, with unpainted surfaces and gabled and shingled cypress bark roofs, were raised on elevated wooden platforms and connected to each other with covered and uncovered slightly elevated passages. Between the buildings and passages were gravel yards and small gardens.

=== Shishinden ===
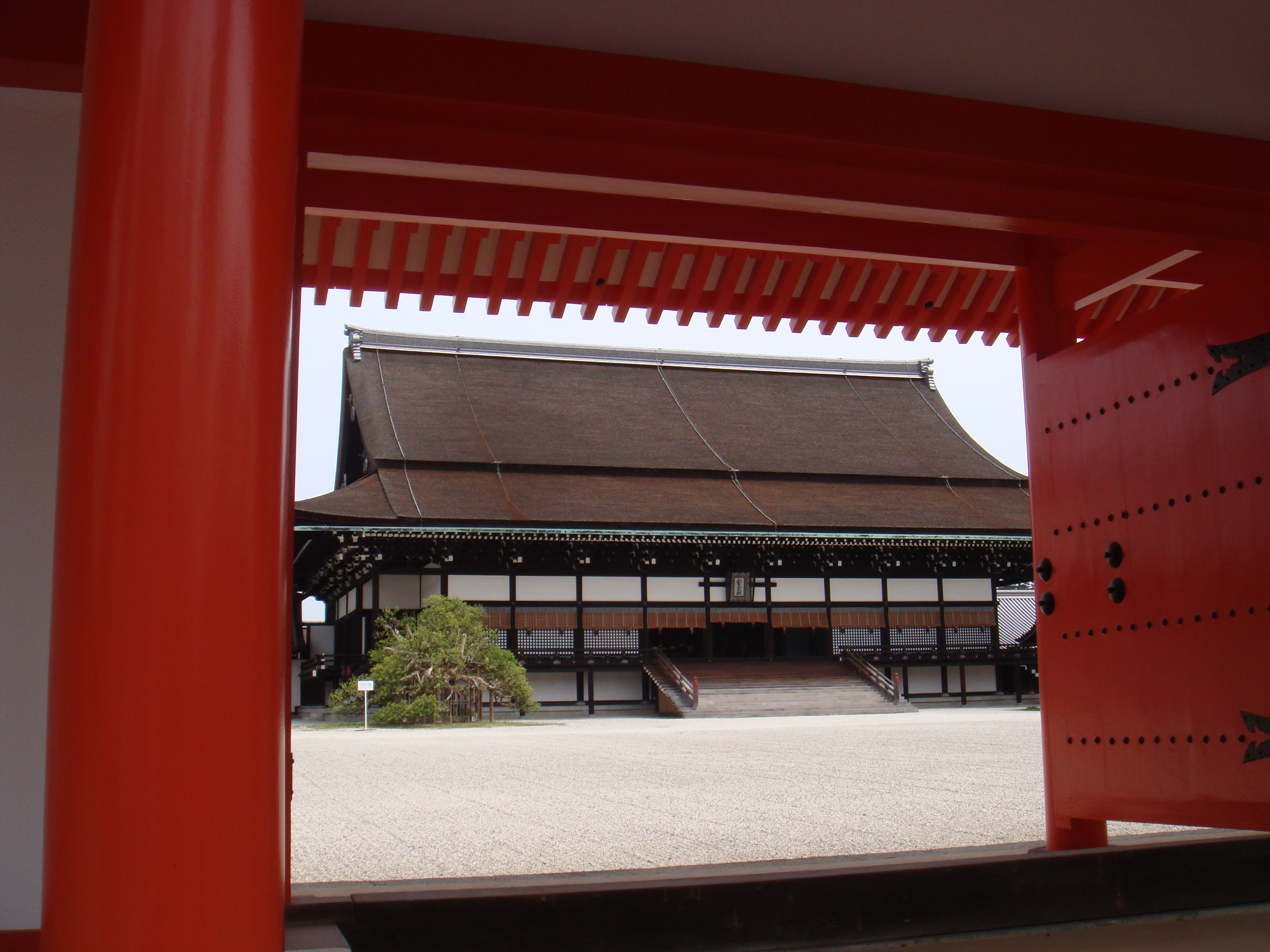
The Shishinden of the present-day Kyoto Imperial Palace, built according to Heian period models

The largest building of the Dairi was the Throne Hall (紫宸殿, Shishinden), a building reserved for official functions. It was a rectangular hall measuring approximately 30 m (98 ft) east to west and 25 m (82 ft) north to south. Along with its accompanying rectangular courtyard, the Shishinden was situated along the median north-south axis of the Dairi, facing the Shōmeimon gate. A tachibana orange tree and a cherry tree stood symmetrically on both sides of the front staircase of the building. The courtyard was flanked on both sides by smaller halls connected to the Shishinden, creating the same configuration of buildings (influenced by Chinese examples) that was found in the aristocratic shinden-style villas of the period.

The Shishinden was used for official functions and ceremonies that were not held at the Daigokuden of the Chōdō-in complex. It took over much of the intended use of the larger and more formal building from an early date, as the daily business of government ceased to be conducted in the presence of the emperor in the Daigokuden already at the beginning of the ninth century. Connected to this diminishing reliance on the official government procedures described in the ritsuryō code was the establishment of a personal secretariat to the emperor, the Chamberlain's Office (蔵人所, Kurōdodokoro). This office, which increasingly took over the role of coordinating the work of government organs, was set up in the Kyōshōden (校書殿), the hall to the south-west of the Shishinden.

=== Residences ===
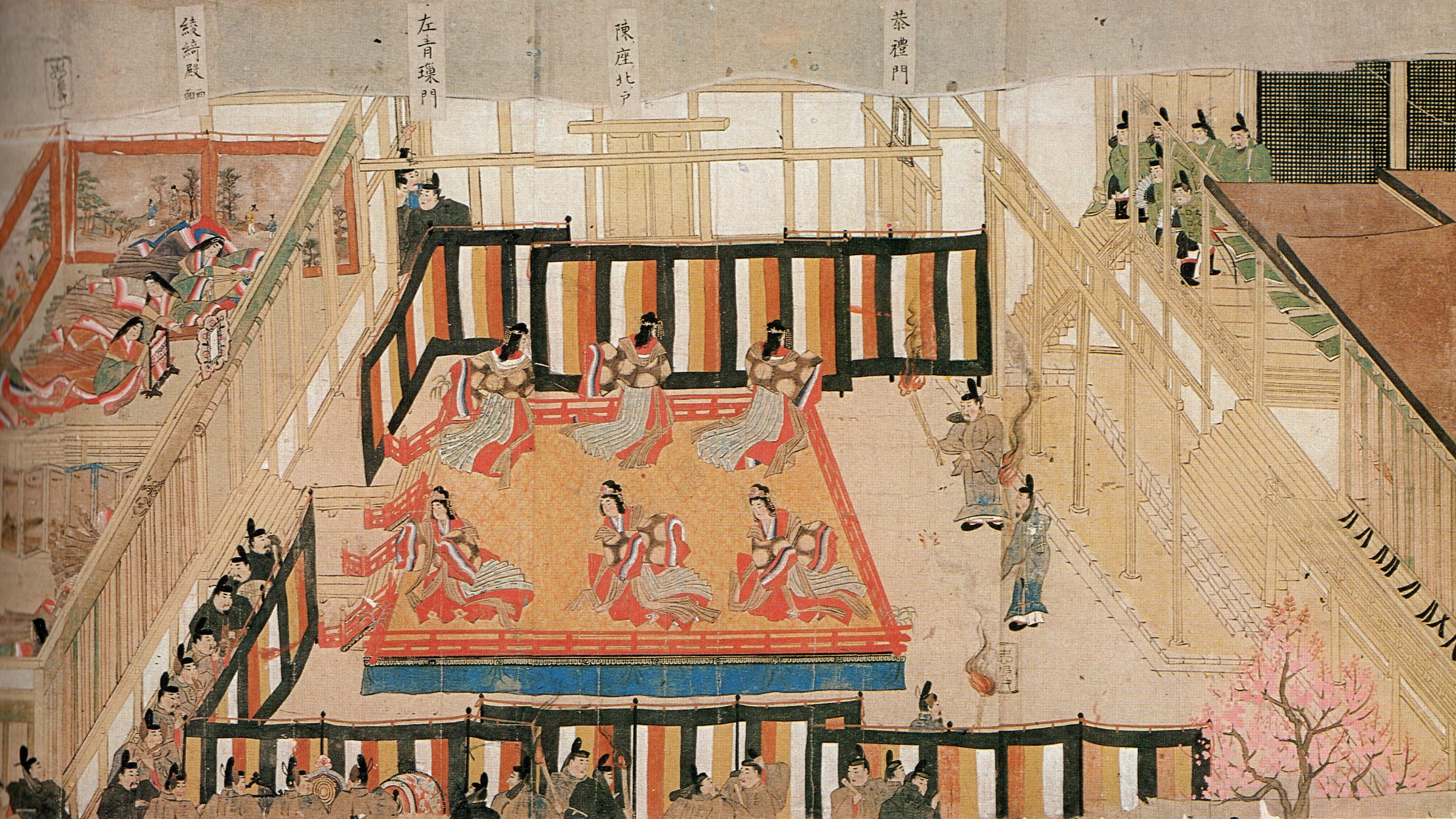
Naien (内宴), imperial banqueting at Jijūden (仁寿殿) in Late Heian period. Jijūden was located on the right side and ryokiden (綾綺殿) on left side.

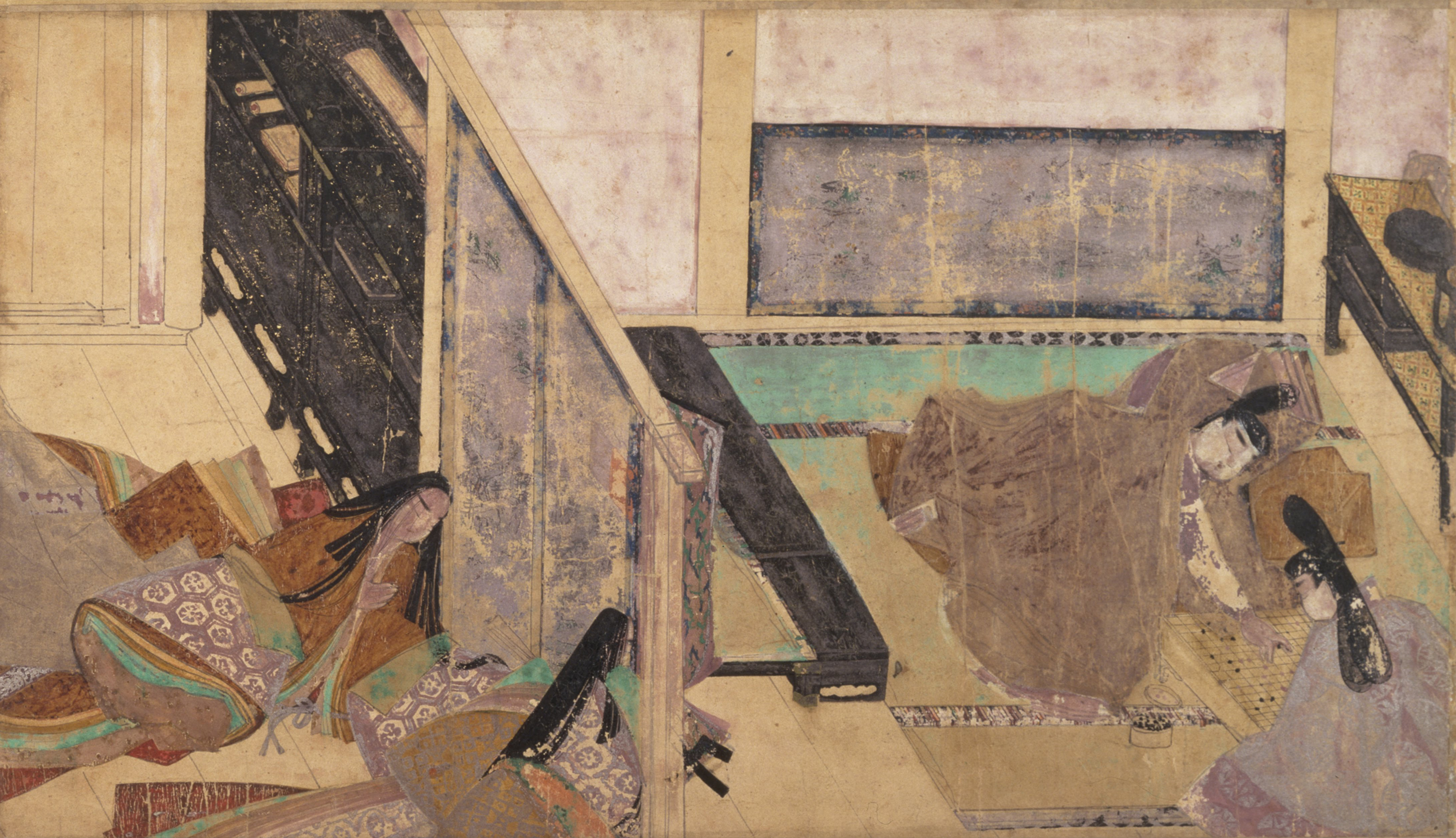
A 12th-century illustrated handroll (part of the Genji Monogatari Emaki) depicting a scene from The Tale of Genji set in the Seiryōden

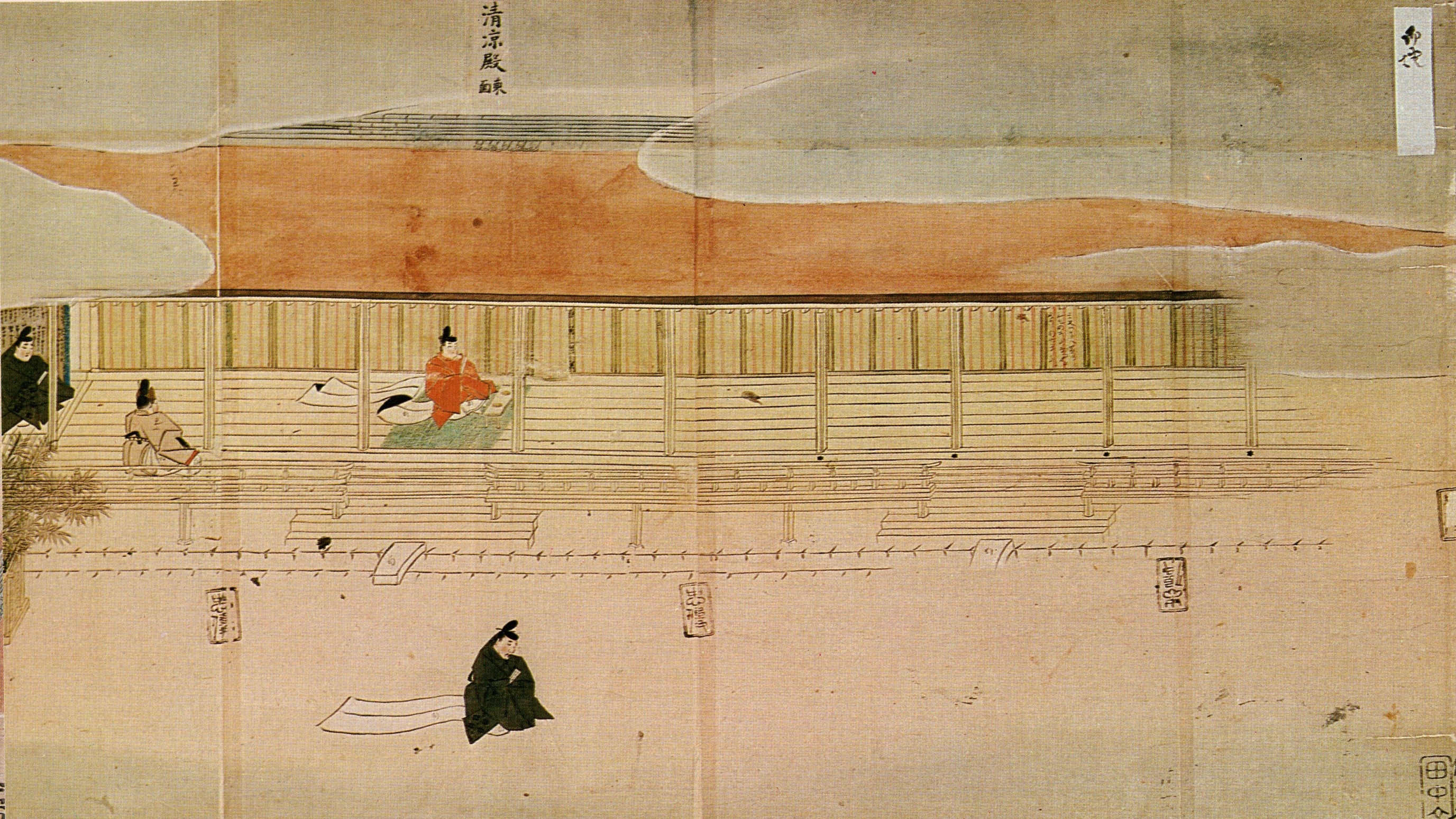
Seiryōden (清涼殿) in late Heian period

To the north of the Shishinden stood the Jijūden (仁寿殿), a similarly constructed hall of somewhat smaller size that was originally intended to function as the emperor's living quarters. Beginning in the ninth century, the emperors often chose to reside in other buildings of the Dairi. A third smaller hall, the Shōkyōden (承香殿) was located next to the north along the main axis of the Dairi. It faced a garden in the north and was used for flower-viewing and other banquets before becoming residential space for imperial consorts in the 10th century. It also housed the editorial team of the first imperial waka poetry collection Kokinshū.

After the Dairi was rebuilt following a fire in 960, the regular residence of the emperors moved to the smaller Seiryōden (清涼殿), an east-facing building located immediately to the north-west from Shishinden. Gradually the Seiryōden began to be used increasingly for meetings as well, with emperors spending much of their time in this part of the palace. The busiest part of the building was the Courtiers' Hall (殿上間, Tenjōnoma), where high-ranking nobles came to meet in the presence of the emperor. There were ryoukiden (綾綺殿) pavilion housing the emperor's bathing quarters and dressing chamber.

=== Other Inner Palace buildings ===
The empress and other official and unofficial imperial consorts were also housed in the Dairi, occupying buildings in the northern part of the enclosure. The most prestigious buildings, housing the empress and the official consorts, were the ones that had appropriate locations for such use according to the Chinese design principles – the Kokiden (弘徽殿), the Reikeiden (麗景殿) and the Jōneiden (常寧殿) – as well as the ones closest to the imperial residence in the Seiryōden (the Kōryōden (後涼殿) and the Fujitsubo (藤壷)). Lesser consorts and ladies-in-waiting as well as occasionally some of the crown prince's consorts occupied other buildings of the Dairi further away from the emperor's quarters, i.e., towards north-east. A famous fictional depiction of the spatial status hierarchy concerns the eponymous character's low-ranking mother in The Tale of Genji. However, such distinctions were apparently not always strict.

One of the Imperial Regalia of Japan, the emperor's replica of the sacred mirror, was housed in the Unmeiden hall (温明殿) of the Dairi. The present-day Kyoto Imperial Palace, located in what was the north-eastern corner of Heian-kyō, reproduces much of the Heian-period Dairi.

== See also ==
- Architecture of Japan
