= Kyūseki Teien =

Japanese garden in Nara, Nara Prefecture, Japan

Coordinates: 34.6837°N 135.8023°E

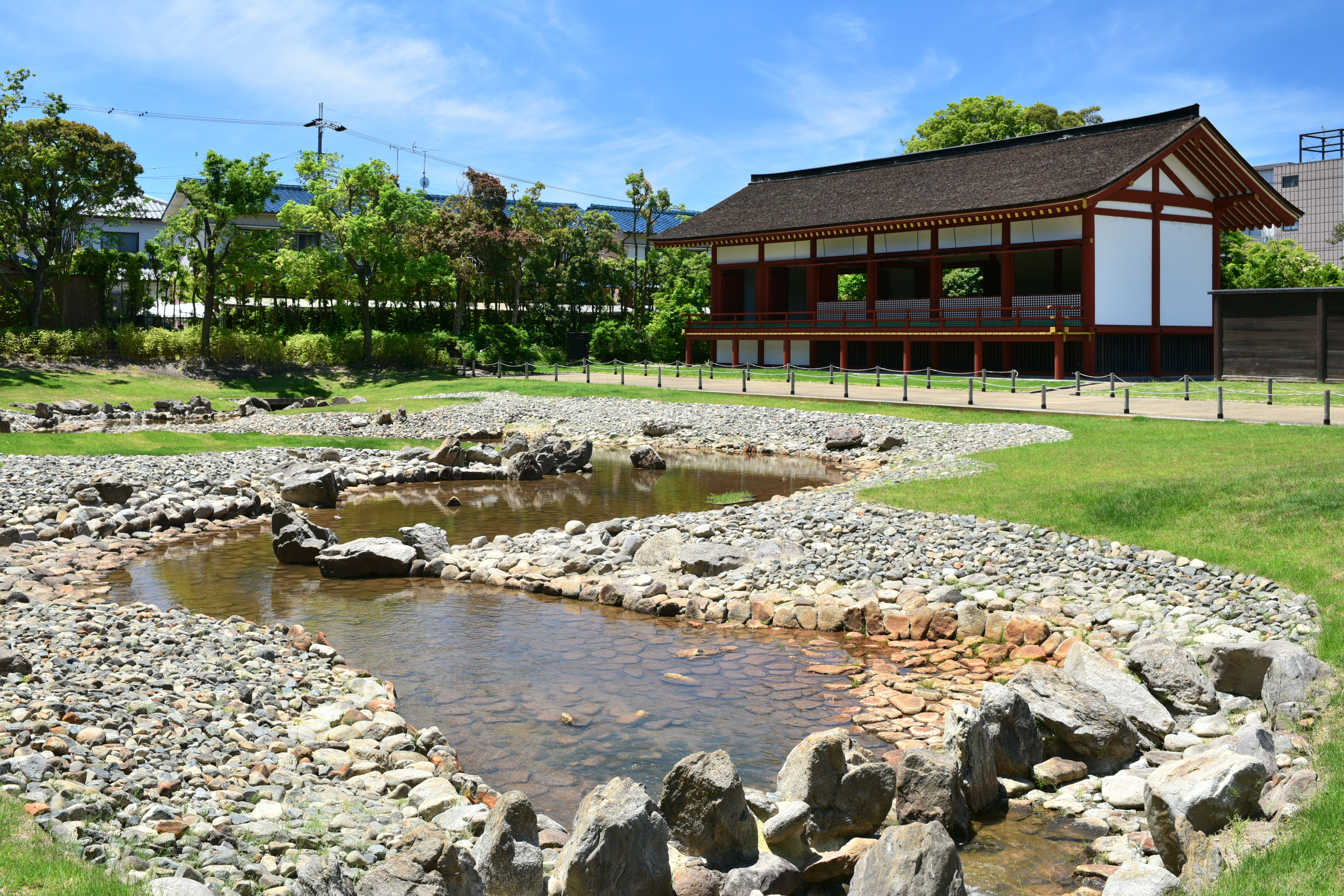
Overall view of the garden (2020)

The Kyūseki Teien, also known as the Heijō-kyō Sakyo Sanjo Nibo Palace Garden (平城京左京三条二坊宮跡庭園, Heijō-kyō Sakyo Sanjo Nibo Miya Atoteien) is a Japanese garden dating to the Nara period, located in Nara, Nara, western Japan.

The garden and pavilions date to the same period of the Heijō Palace. The remains were excavated in the 1970s and restored.
