= Kujō Tadaie =

Kujō Tadaie (九条 忠家; 1229–1275)

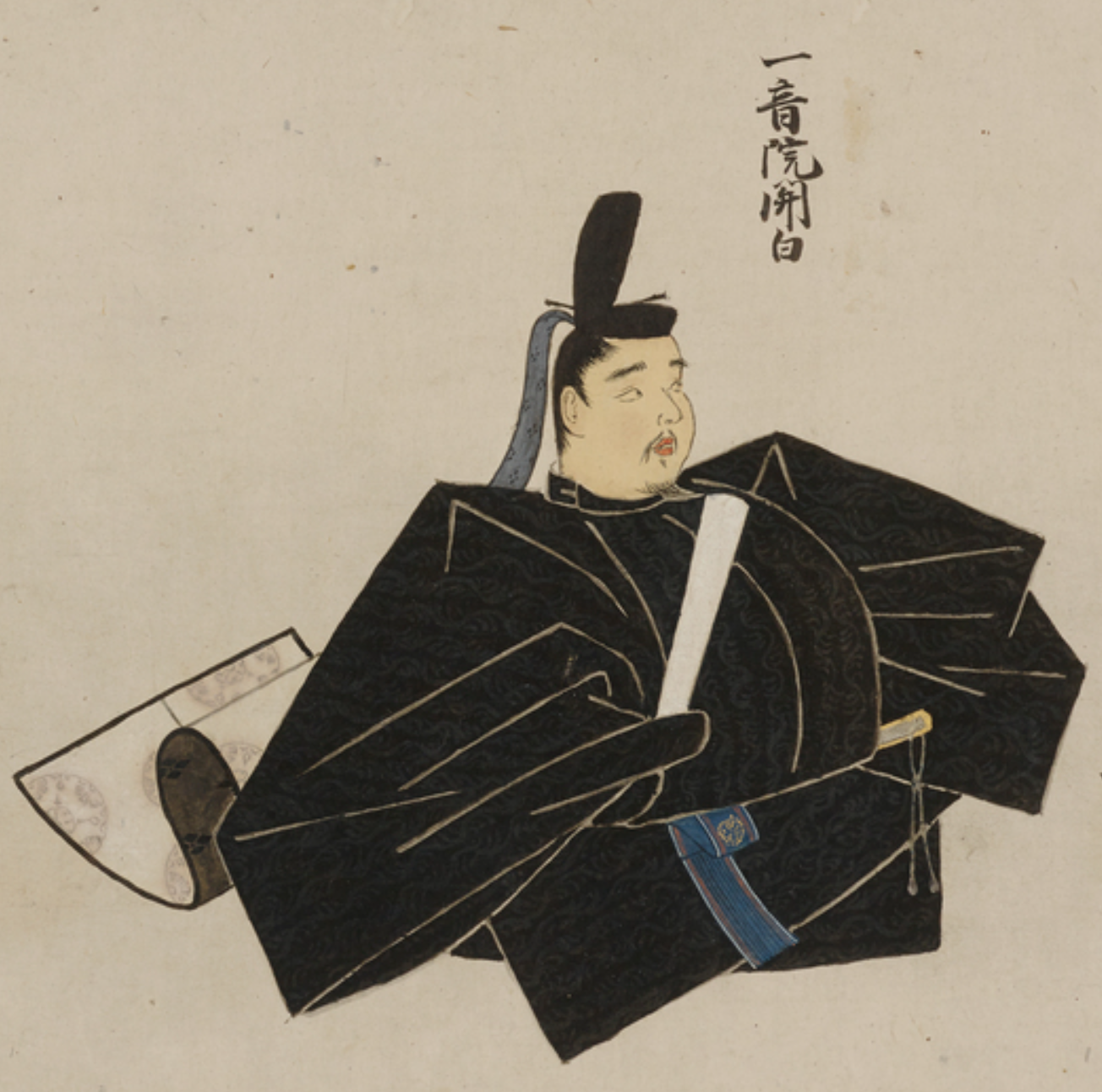

, son of regent Norizane, was a kugyō or Japanese court noble of the Kamakura period. He held regent positions kampaku from 1273 to 1274 and sessho in 1274. Tadanori and Kujō Tadatsugu (九条 忠嗣; 1253-?) were his sons born by a daughter of Sanjō Kinfusa.

== Family ==
- Father: Kujō Norizane
- Mother: Fujiwara Yuko
- Wife and Children:
  - Wife: Sanjō Kinfusa’s daughter
    - Kujō Tadatsugu (1253-?)
    - Kujō Tadanori
    - Shincho (1266 - 1322)
  - Unknown
    - Jicho
    - Jinkei
    - Seikei
    - Kakuei
    - ??? (隆信)
