= Kujō Moronori =

Japanese nobleman (1273–1320)

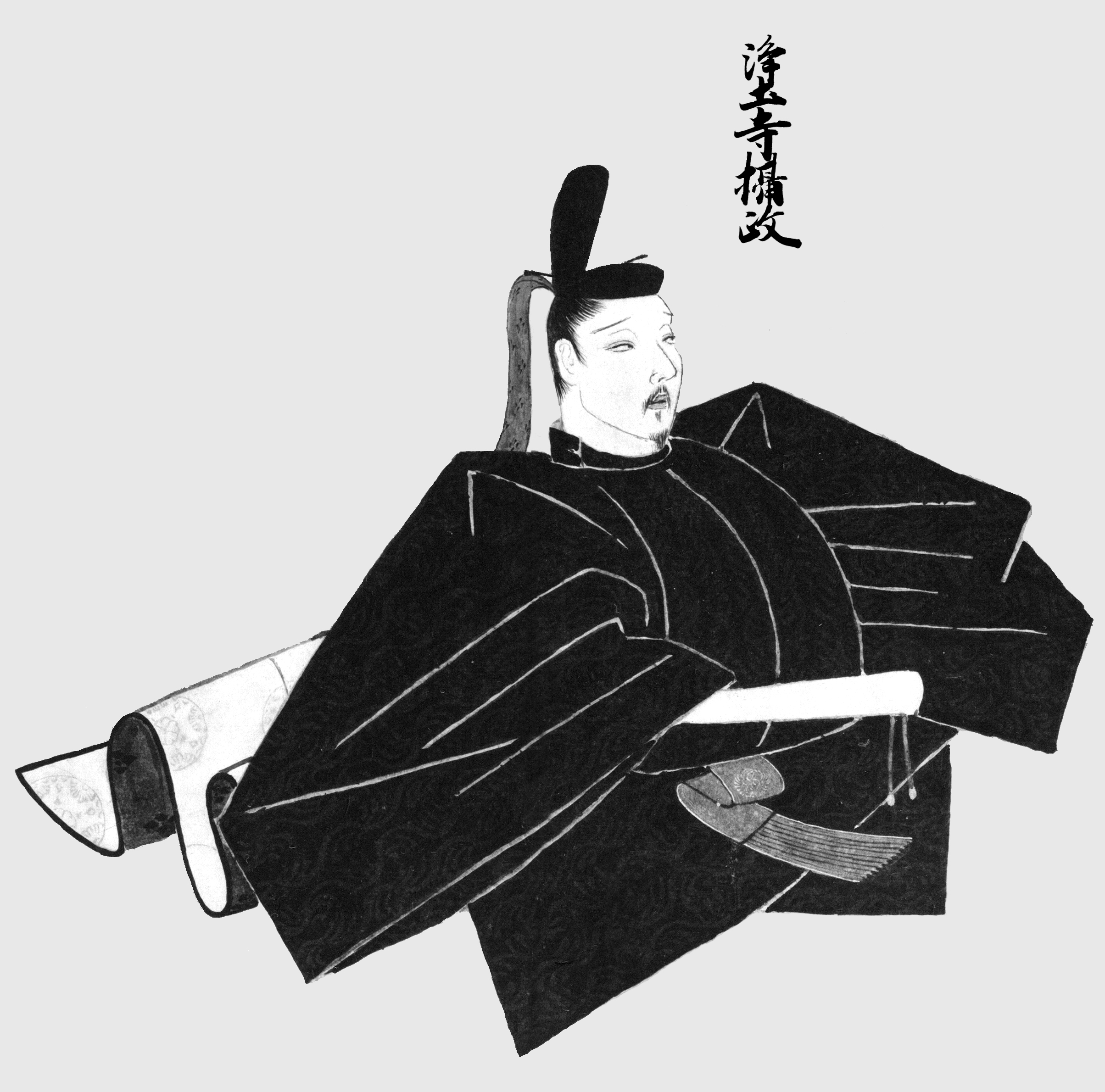
Kujō Moronori

Kujō Moronori (九条 師教; 1273–1320), son of regent Tadanori, was a kugyō or Japanese court noble of the Kamakura period (1185–1333). He held regent positions kampaku from 1305 to 1308 and sessho in 1308. A daughter of Emperor Kameyama was his consort; the couple adopted his brother Fusazane as their son. His other consort gave birth to Michinori who was in turn adopted by Fusazane.

== Family ==
- Father: Kujō Tadanori
- Mother: Saionji Kinsuke‘s daughter
- Wife and Children:
  - Wife: Emperor Kameyama‘s daughter
  - Wife: Imperial Prince Moriyoshi’s daughter
    - Kujō Michinori
  - unknown
    - ??? (覚尊)
    - Seiso (1319-1368)
