= Kujō Fusazane =

Japanese noble (1290–1327)

Kujō Fusazane (九条 房実; 1290–1327)

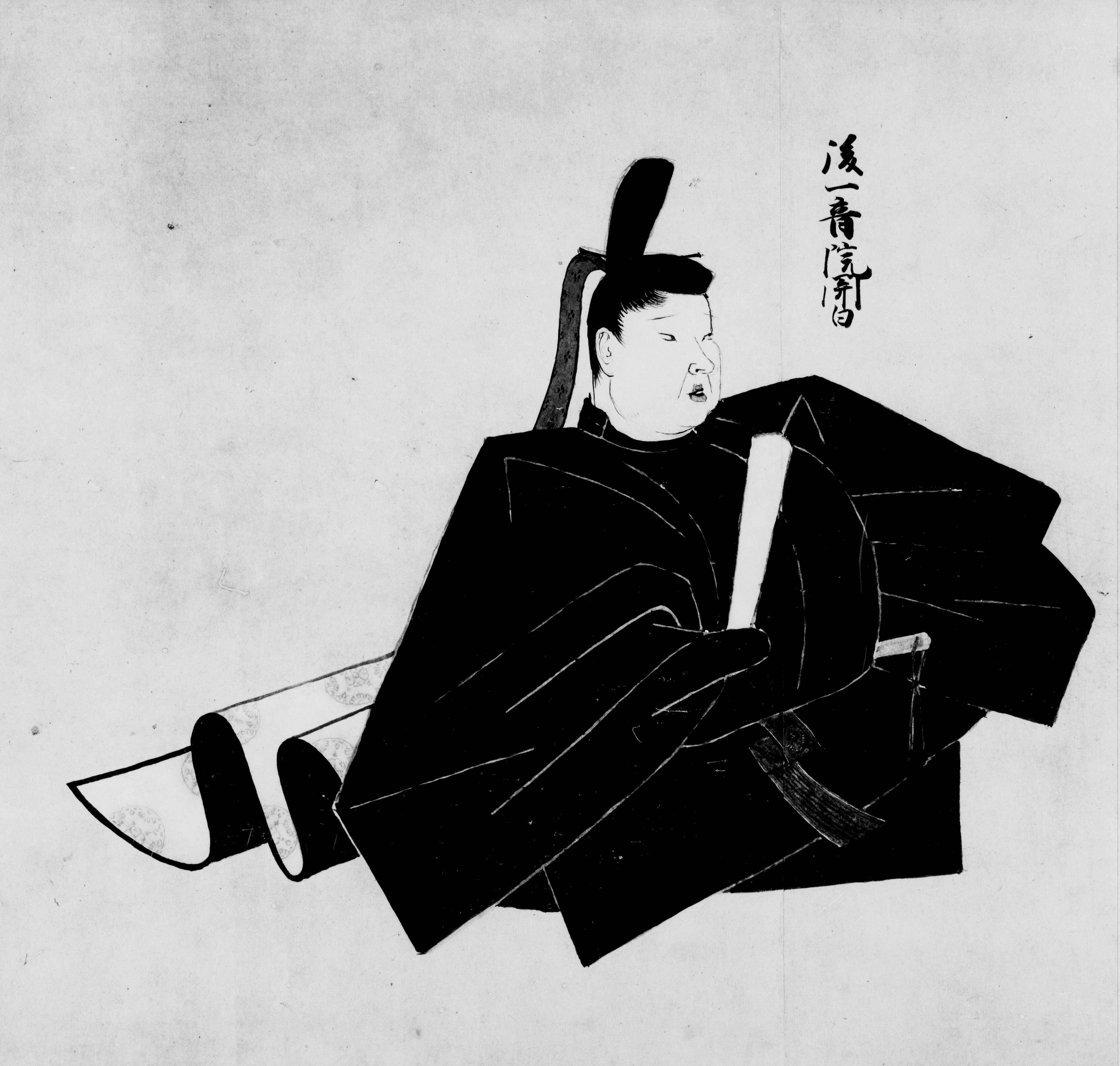
"Portrait of the Emperor and Regent" by Kujo Fusazane (Go-ichion-in Regent)

Son of regent Tadanori with Fujiwara Aritoki's daughter and adopted son of Moronori, was a kugyō or Japanese court noble of the Kamakura period (1185–1333). He held a regent position (kampaku) from 1323 to 1324. Nijo Haruko, a daughter of Nijō Kanemoto was his wife with whom he adopted Michinori, son of his adopted father Moronori.
