= Kujō Tadanori =

- Kampaku
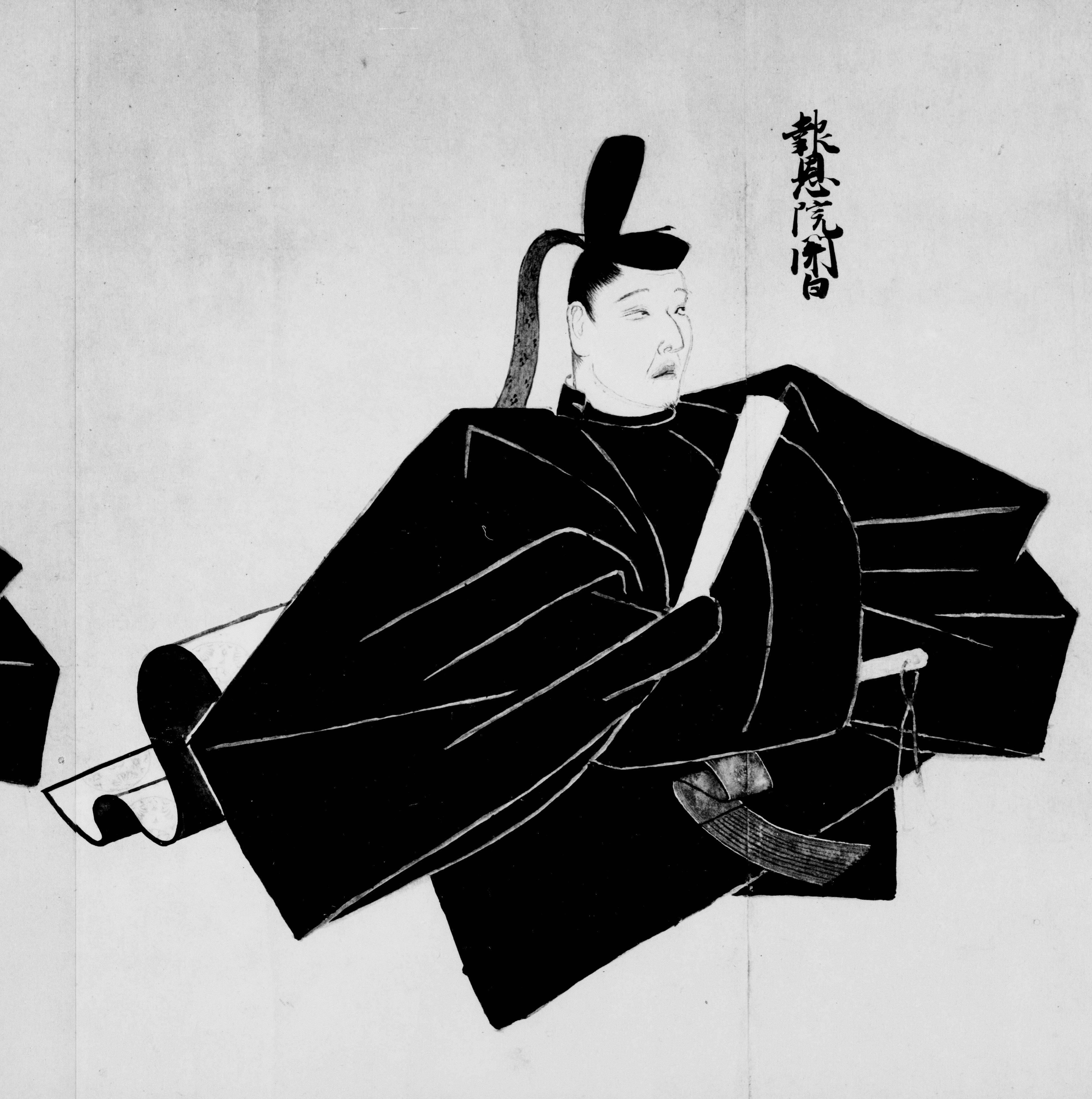
- Portrait of Kujō Tadanori

Regent of Japan
- Tenure: 1291–1293
- Born: 1248; Japan
- Died: 1332 (aged 83–84); Japan
- Family: Kujō family
- Wives: Daughter of Saionji Kinsuke; Daughter of Fujiwara Aritoki; Daughter of Nijō Michinaga
- Children: Kujō Moronori; Kujō Fusazane; Nijo Baishi (married Nijō Kanemoto); Kujō Motonari; Sokaku; Kyokan
- Father: Kujō Tadaie
- Mother: Daughter of Sanjō Kinfusa
- Occupation: Court noble (Kugyō)

Kujō Tadanori (九条 忠教; 1248 – 1332) , son of regent Tadaie, was a kugyō or Japanese court noble of the Kamakura period. He held a regent position kampaku from 1291 to 1293. Moronori and Fusazane were his sons.
