= Kujō Norizane =

Kujō Norizane (九条 教実; 21 January 1210 – 23 April 1235), son of regent Michiie, was a kugyō or Japanese court noble of the Kamakura period. He held regent positions kampaku from 1231 to 1232 and sessho from 1232 to 1235. Tadaie was his son.

== Family ==
- Father: Kujō Michiie
- Mother: Sainonji Rinshi (1192-1251)
- Wife and Children:
  - Wife: Fujiwara Yuko, Fujiwara Sadasue's daughter
    - Kujō Tadaie
  - Wife: Saionji Yoshiko
    - Kujō Genshi (1227-1262) married Emperor Shijō
  - unknown:
    - Soshin (1228-1283)
    - ??? (済助)
