= Heijō Palace =

Imperial residence in Nara, Japan

Coordinates: 34°41′28″N 135°47′44″E

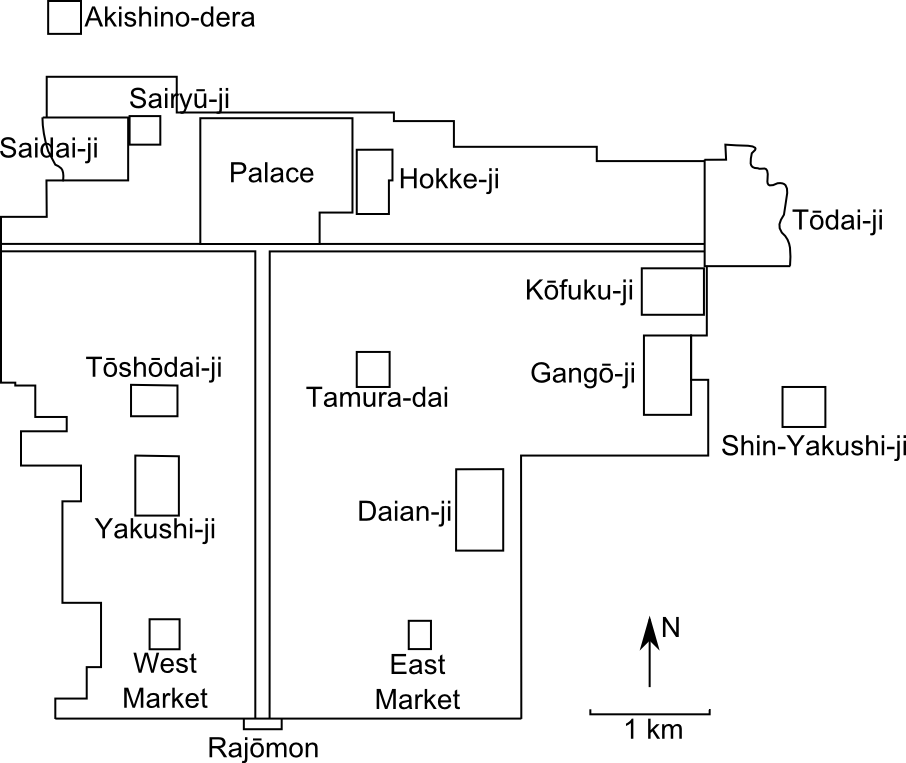
Map of the major sites of Heijō-kyō, with the palace to the north

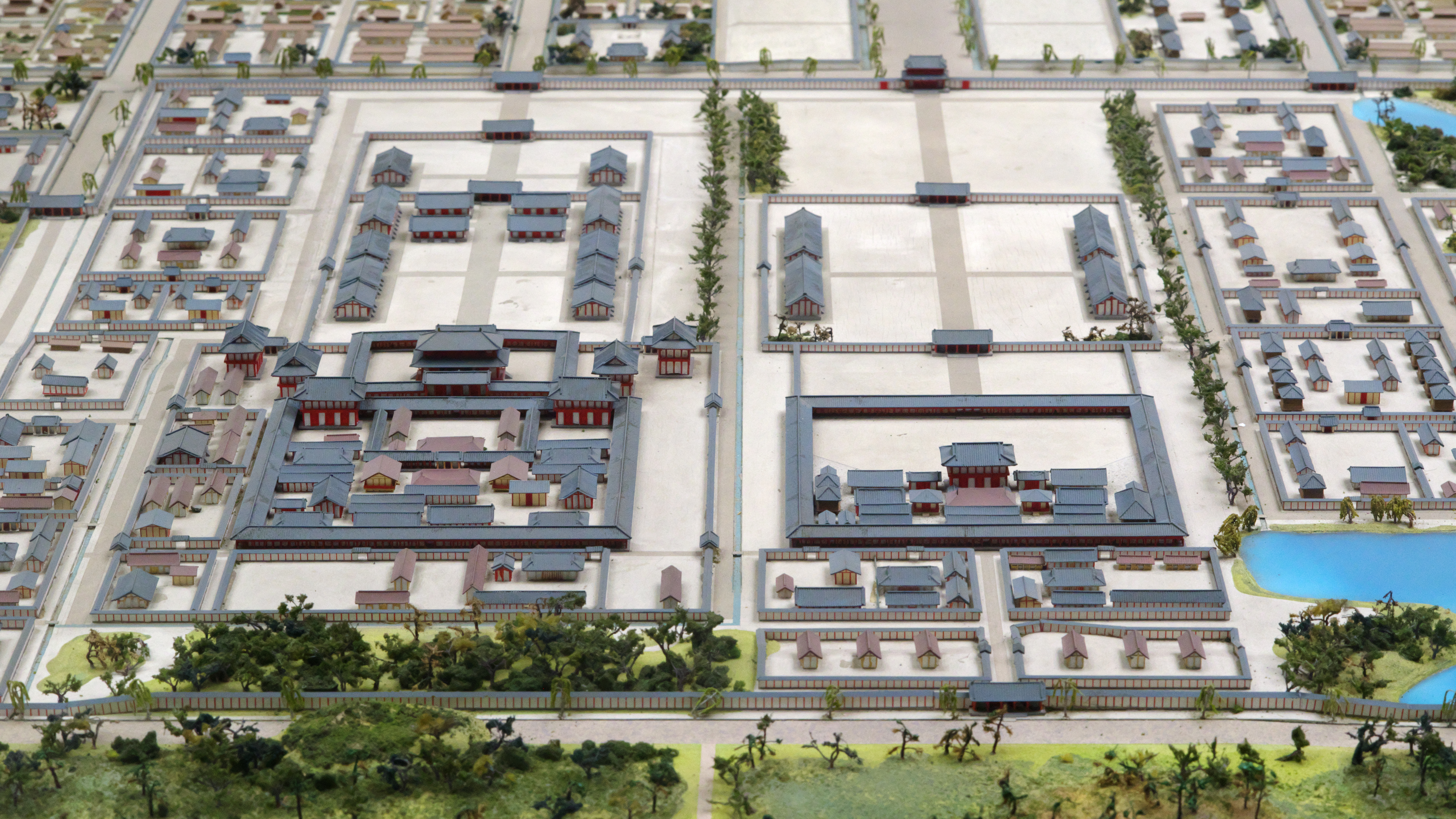
A model of the main part of Heijō Palace, a part of the Heijōkyō 1/1000 model held by Nara City Hall. View from the north.

Heijō Palace (平城宮, Heijō-kyū) was the imperial residence in the Japanese capital city Heijō-kyō (today's Nara), during most of the Nara period. The palace, which served as the imperial residence and the administrative centre for most of the Nara period from 710 to 794 AD, was located at the north-central location of the city in accordance with the Chinese models used for the design of the capital.

The palace consisted of a daidairi (大内裏; also pronounced taidairi), a large rectangular walled enclosure which contained several ceremonial and administrative buildings, including the government ministries. Inside this enclosure was the separately walled residential compound of the emperor or the Inner Palace. In addition to the emperor's living quarters, the Inner Palace contained the residences of the imperial consorts as well as certain official and ceremonial buildings more closely linked to the person of the emperor.

The original role of the palace was to manifest the centralised government model adopted by Japan from China in the 7th century—the Daijō-kan and its subsidiary Eight Ministries. The palace was designed to provide an appropriate setting for the emperor's residence, the conduct of state affairs, and associated ceremonial functions.

After the capital was moved to Heian, the palace structures were either moved there or suffered several fires and other disasters and disappeared. The site was converted to agricultural use, and almost no trace of it remained; the location was still known, however. Excavations started in the 1970s, and large-scale reconstruction based on contemporary literary sources and excavations started in the 2000s.

The excavated remains of the palace and the surrounding area were established as a UNESCO World Heritage Site in 1998 along with a number of other buildings in the area, identified collectively as the "Historic Monuments of Ancient Nara."

== History ==
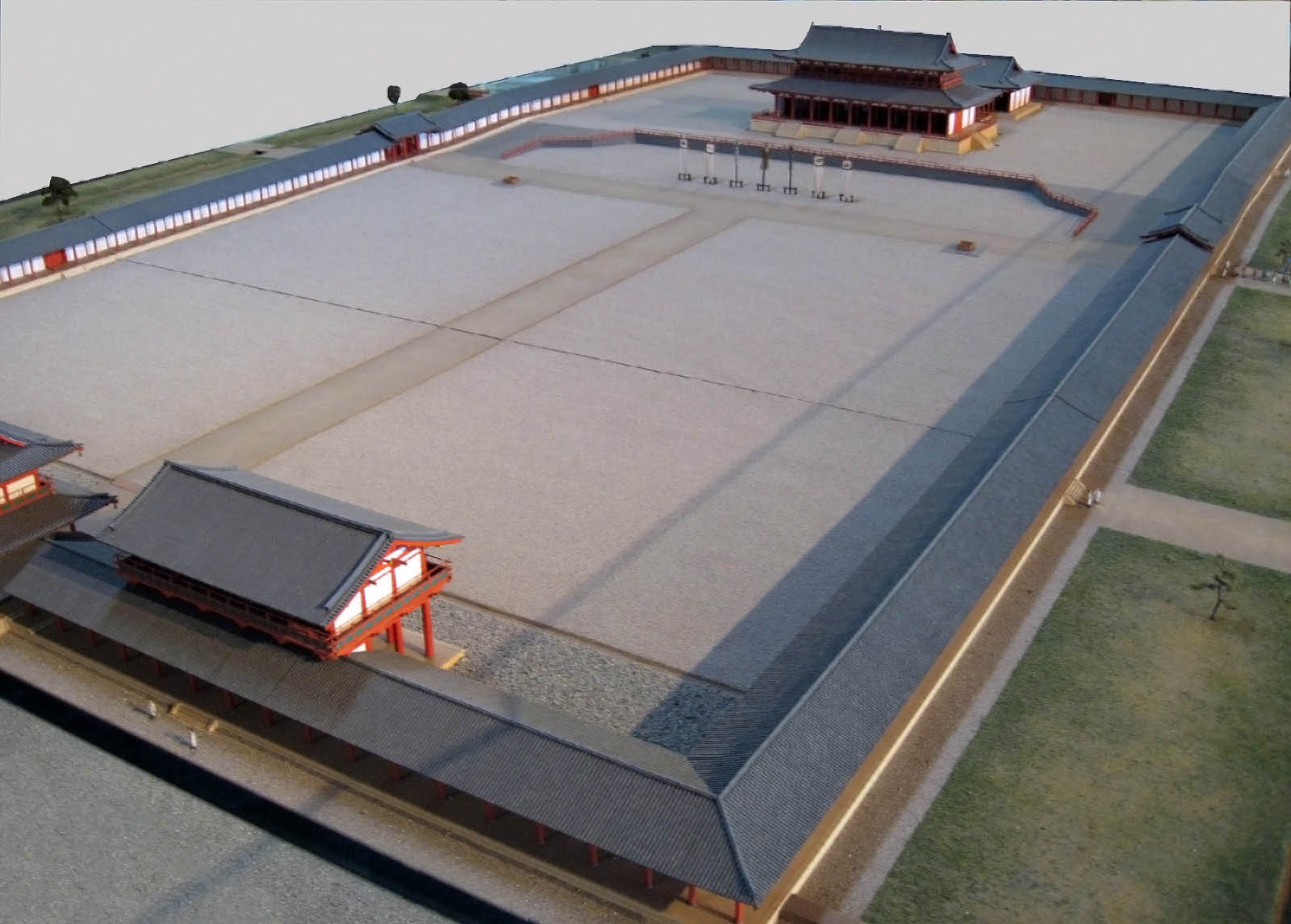
Miniature model of the former imperial audience hall compound

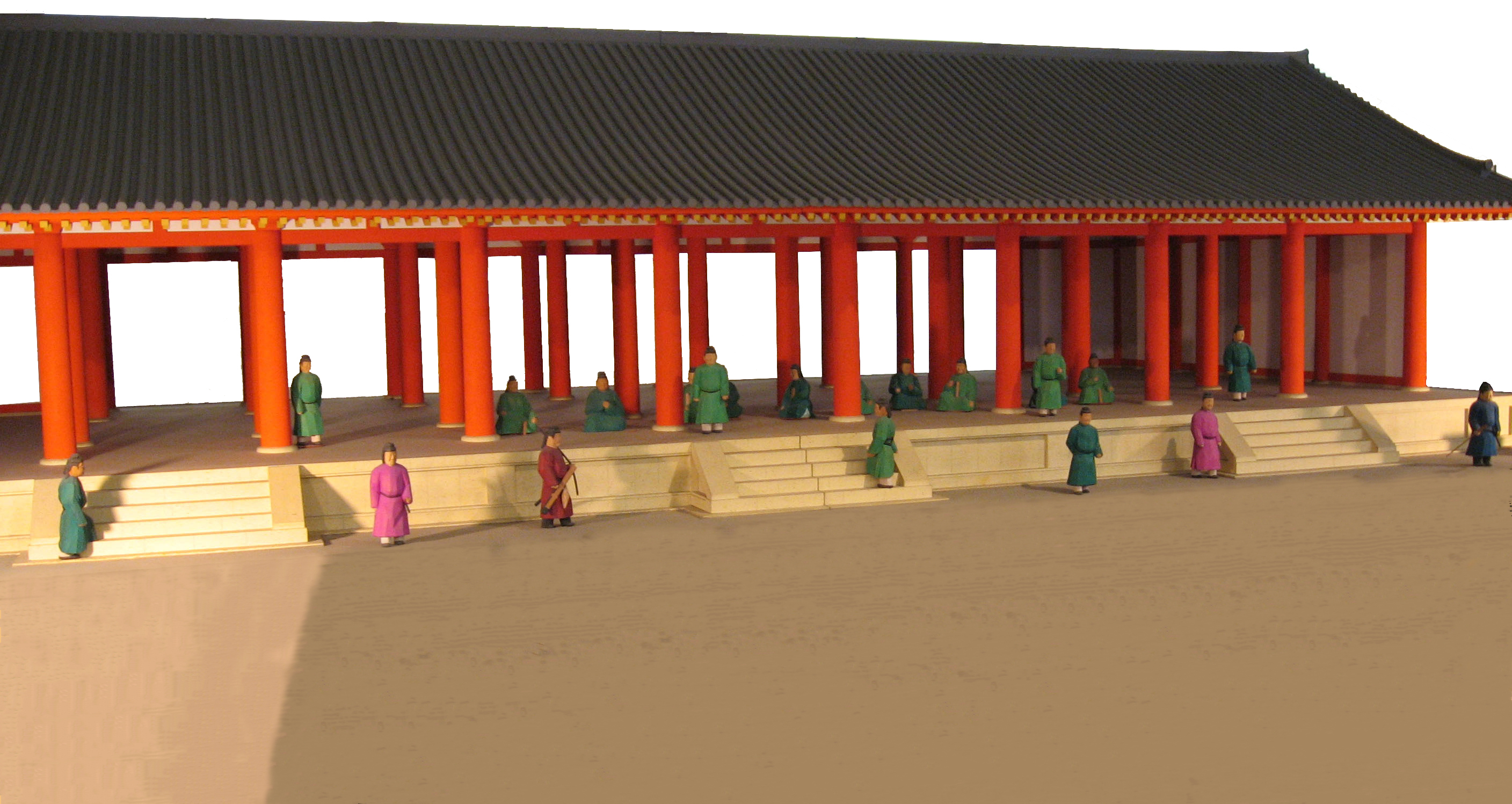
Miniature model of the east assembly hall (Choshu-den) of the latter imperial audience hall compound

One year after Empress Genmei's succession to the Chrysanthemum Throne in Keiun 4 (707 AD), a rescript was issued deciding on the move from Fujiwara-kyō near Asuka towards the northern edge of the Nara basin. In Wadō 3 (710 AD), the new capital was officially established, but the completion of the palace had to wait further. The new capital city's name was written Heijō (平城), but also pronounced Nara at the time.

The city, and the palace grounds, was based largely on Chang'an (present-day Xi'an), the capital of China during the Tang dynasty, which was contemporary to the time when Nara was capital. Chang'an was in turn, like many ancient east Asian cities, based on a complex system of beliefs & laws of geomancy. This dictated the grid system of streets, as well as the necessity for spiritually protective shrines or temples to be placed at particular cardinal directions around the city. The city area measured 6 kilometers (3.7 mi) from east to west and 5 kilometers (3.1 mi) from north to south.

In accordance with this system, the palace was placed at the northern end, on an extended line from Suzaku Street, the main thoroughfare running north–south straight through the center of the city. The street ended at the Suzaku Gate, and the rest of the palace buildings were then placed beyond to the north of this gate. The primary buildings of the palace compound were the Daigoku-den, where governmental affairs were conducted, the Chōdō-in where formal ceremonies were held, the Dairi, the emperor's residence, and offices for various administrative agencies.

The Nara period covers 75 years from 710 to 784 AD. Emperor Shōmu moved the capital to other places, such as Kuni-kyō and Shigaraki Palace, in the period between 740 and 745 AD. The imperial buildings and government offices were drastically transformed around this period. In the later Nara period, the audience hall was erected in the eastern part, at the south side of the imperial domicile. This is called the latter audience hall. A number of buildings in the imperial domicile and the government offices were replaced and renovated several times. This was probably not due to the repair of the old buildings but due to another reason.

When the capital was moved to Heian-kyō (now called Kyoto), Nara's Imperial Palace was simply abandoned. Over the ensuing centuries, the ravages of time and the elements slowly destroyed the buildings, until by the beginning of the Kamakura period in the late 12th century there was practically nothing left above ground. However, those sections that lay underground were preserved and later rediscovered by modern archaeologists.

While the site was designated a Special Historical Site by the Agency for Cultural Affairs in 1952, archaeological efforts headed by the National Research Institute for Cultural Properties, such as excavations, are continuing since 1959. The Suzaku Gate and East Palace Garden have been restored and opened to the public in 1998. The Takenaka Corporation was mainly responsible for the reconstruction.

Heijō Palace was the main event site of Heijo Relocation 1300 Year Festival (平城遷都1300年祭, Narasento 1300-nen-sai) in 2010, and the First Great Hall (第一次大極殿, First Daigokuden) was restored for the occasion. In commemorative events of the 1300th anniversary, a variety of seasonal events were held throughout Nara Prefecture.

== Structures ==
=== Suzaku Gate ===
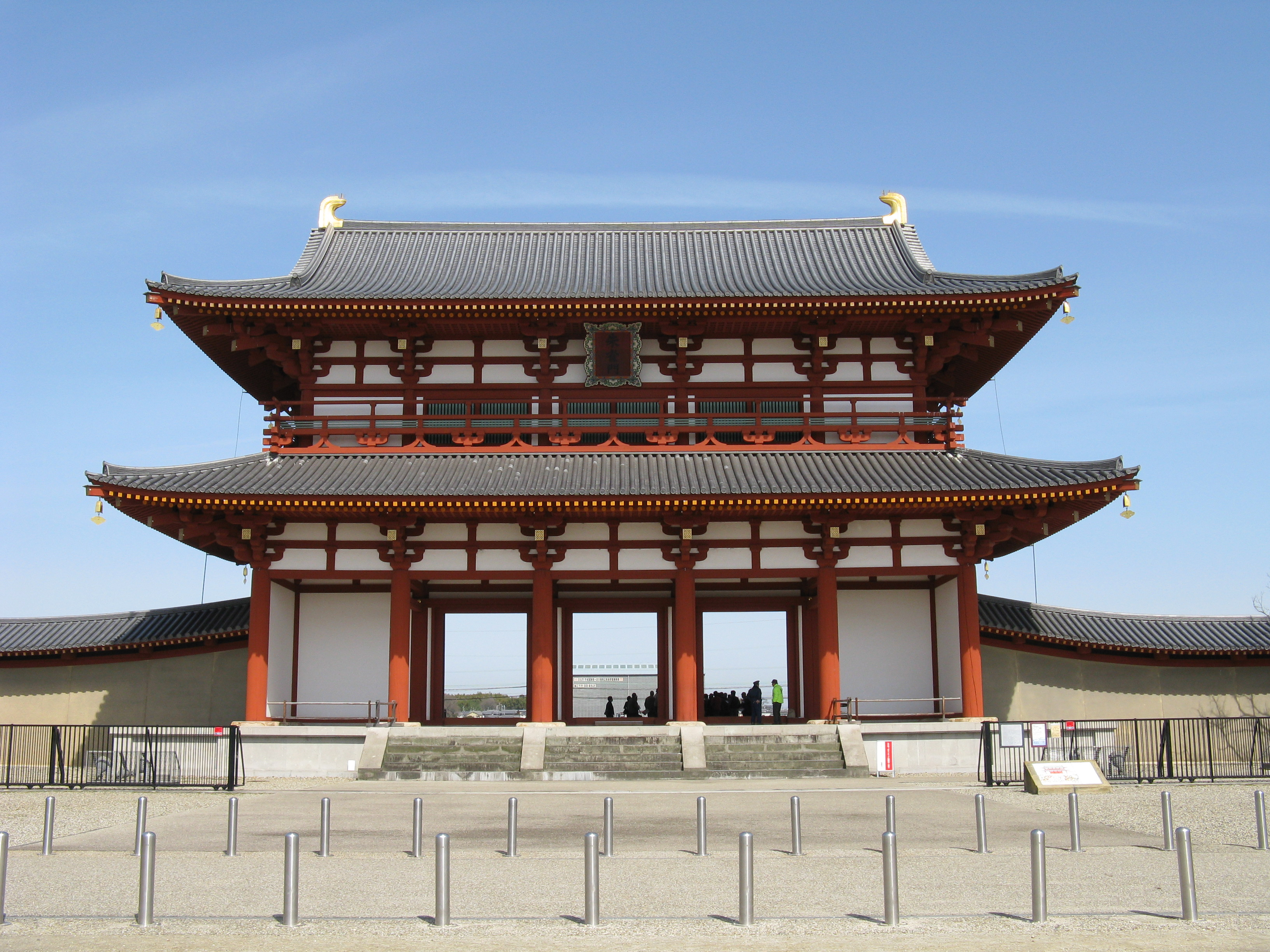
The Suzaku Gate is the main entrance to the palace

The main entrance to the capital through the Suzaku Avenue was the Rajō Gate (羅城門, Rajōmon). The main avenue was approximately 75 meters (246 ft) wide and extended north for 3.7 kilometers (2.3 mi) up to the Suzaku Gate (朱雀門, Suzakumon). The name "Suzaku" derives from the Chinese name for the legendary bird which acted as a southern guardian. The palace was surrounded by great earthen walls and had twelve gates, with the Suzaku Gate as the largest gate and the main entrance. The southern open space was part of the main avenue, and the Nijo Oji (二条大路, Nijō-Ōji), the second great street, approximately 37 metres (121 ft) wide extended in the east–west direction in front of the gate.

The gate measured 10 by 25 by 22 meters (33 ft × 82 ft × 72 ft). Built on a platform, the gate was probably a two-storied structure, conspicuously larger than the other gates of the palace. The open space to the front was used for ceremonies such as New Year celebrations. It was reconstructed in 1998.

=== Second Street and Mibu Gate ===
The Second Street was a major thoroughfare running east–west along the southern side of the palace precinct. Around 35 meters in width, it was second only to Suzaku Avenue in size. The Suzaku Gate, which was the main gate, together with the Mibu Gate to its east and the Wakainukai Gate to its west, all opened onto this avenue.

In the latter half of the Nara period, the Great Hall of State and the Halls of State compound that comprised the center of politics shifted to the eastern sector of the precinct. The Mibu Gate served in effect as the main gate to the palace.

The area immediately to the south of the Second street is known to have been used for state offices and detached residences located outside the palace grounds, and was thus a district rivaling the palace itself in importance.

=== Greater Palace ===
The daidairi was a walled rectangular area extending from north to south between the first and second major east–west avenues and from west to east between the north–south avenues.

The main structures within the Greater Palace were the Official Compound (朝堂院, Chōdō-in) and the Inner Palace (内裏, Dairi).

=== Chōdō-in ===
The Chōdō-in was a rectangular walled enclosure situated directly to the north of the Suzaku Gate in the center of the southern wall of the Greater Palace. It was based on Chinese models and followed Chinese architectural styles, and archaeological evidence from earlier capitals shows that this building complex was present in earlier palaces and had a remarkably stable design from the 7th century onwards.

=== Former audience hall ===
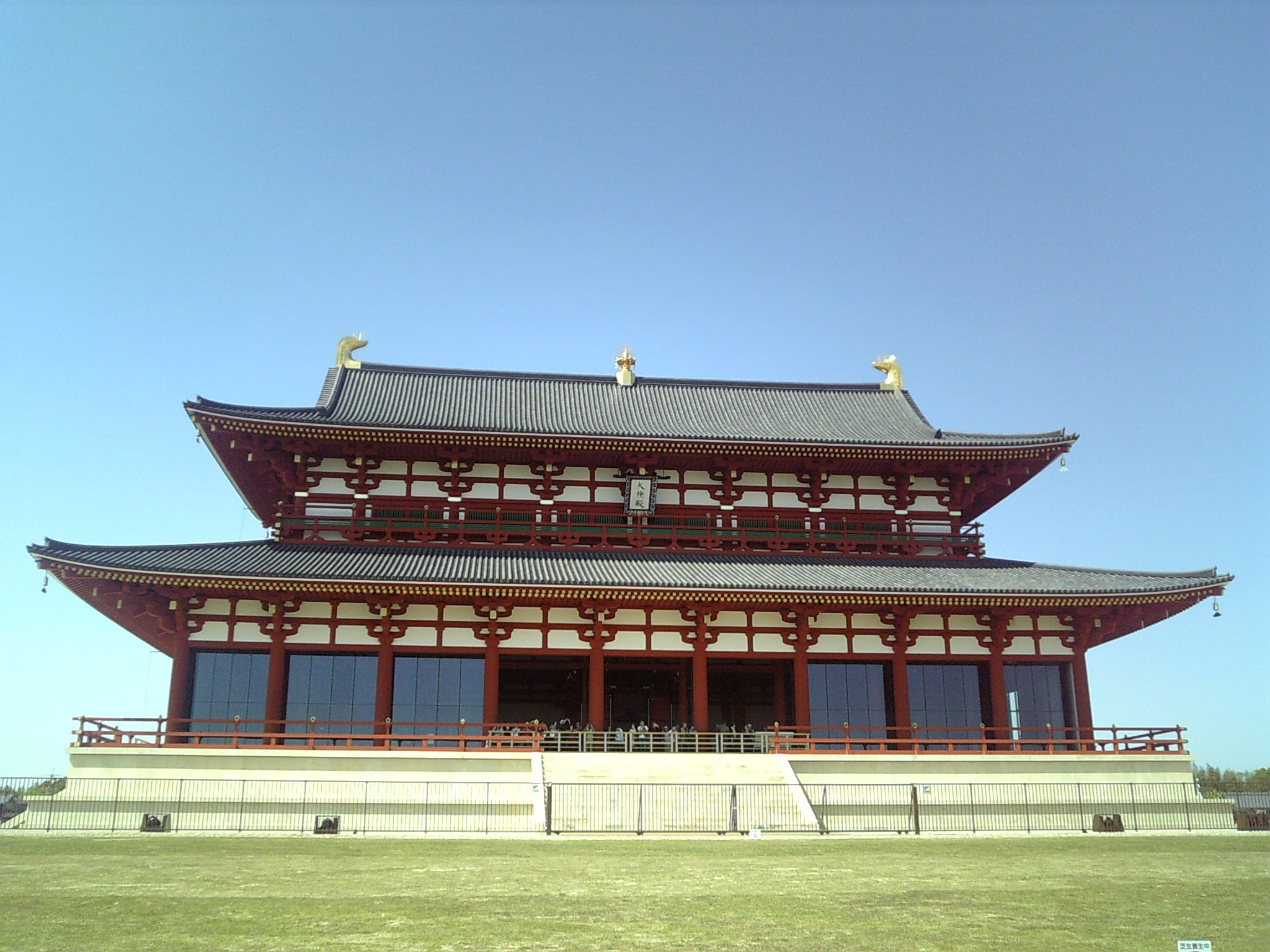
The Great Hall of State

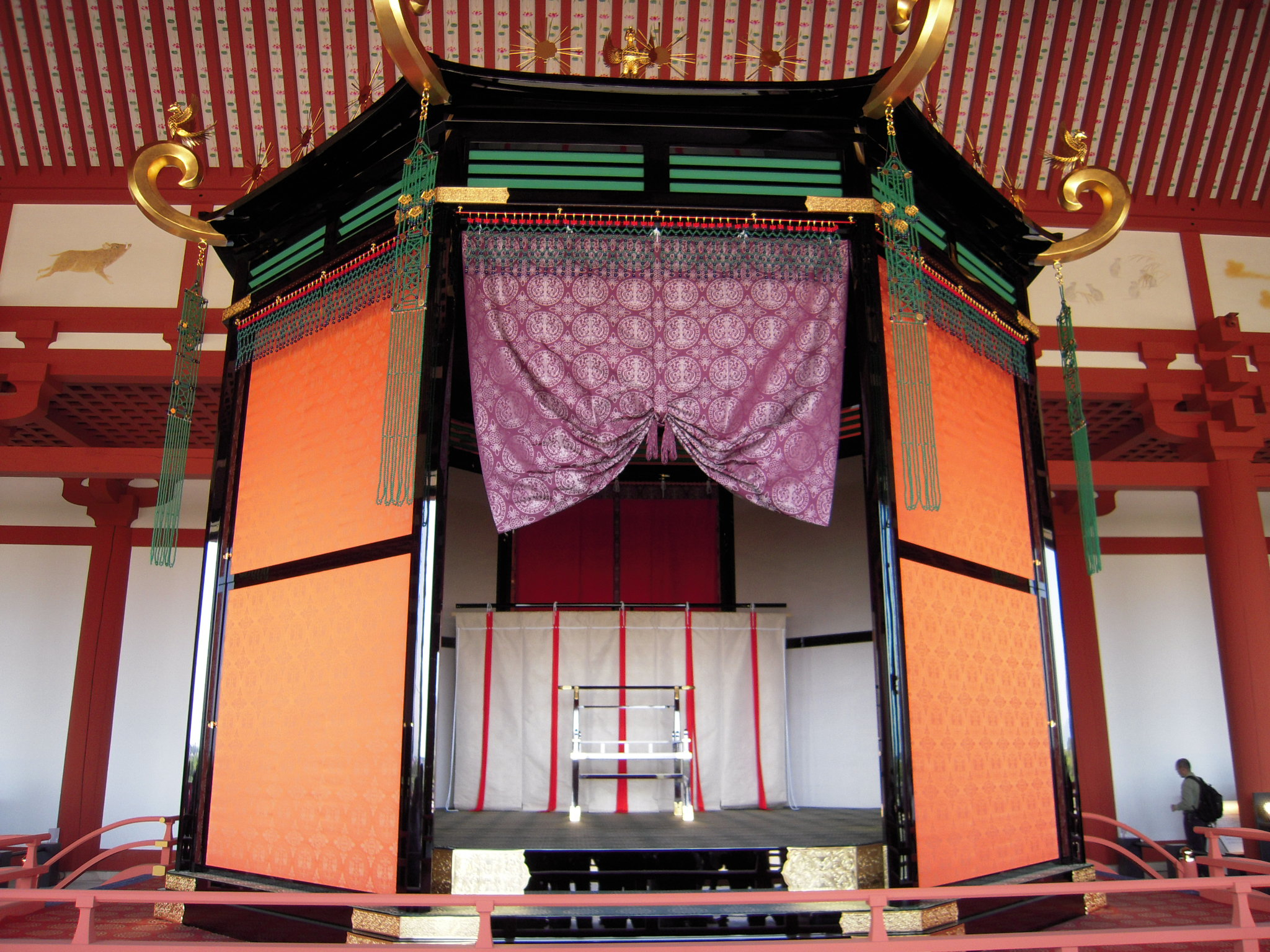
The Takamikura throne in the Great Hall of State

The Great Hall of State (大極殿, Daigokuden) was the most important state building in the palace. It was facing south at the northern end of the compound. It was the largest building, measuring 20 by 44 by 27 meters (66 ft × 144 ft × 89 ft). The hall was thought to have been a two-story Chinese-style structure with a hipped and gabled roof, and an open front façade having no doors.

No data directly indicating the audience hall's true appearance have survived. For the reconstruction, locations of the pillars were inferred through reference to the building's remains at Kuni-kyō, to where it had been relocated. For the upper part of the building, research was conducted on the main hall of Hōryū-ji, the eastern pagoda of Yakushi-ji, and other buildings that survived from the Nara period. The depiction of the Heian Palace audience hall depicted in the Nenchu gyoji emaki (Illustrated scroll of annual events and ceremonies) was also consulted.

The reconstruction was started in 2001 and completed in 2010. For the reconstruction, Japanese cypress wood was used. The building's pillars and beams were painted in vermilion, the walls in white, the roof with ceramic tiles. The upper part of the interior of the hall was painted with symbols of the Chinese zodiac such as the Tiger, the Horse, and the Ox alongside the walls, and floral pattern on the ceiling. The paintings were executed by the renowned painter Atsushi Uemura based on designs from the Nara period.

==== Takamikura ====
In the middle of the audience hall was the emperor's throne, called Takamikura (高御座). This was an important item that symbolised the imperial office, and at state events such as the enthronement and New Year's Day ceremonies, the emperor proceeded to the audience hall and took his seat on the throne. Nobles lined up in the inner court south of the hall and paid their respect.

With no records of the construction or design of the Takamikura of the Nara period, the details are unknown. The reconstructed model of the Takamikura was made after experts consulted various literature and historical materials, and was based on the throne in the Kyoto Imperial Palace, which dates to the Taishō era. Details of the design and patterns were created by referring to materials such as the treasure of the Shōsōin repository.

=== Office of Foods ===
This area, stretching northward from the centrally located Great Hall of State, is believed to have been the site of the Office of Foods. This office stocked foods other than the rice that was paid as tax, and was in charge of providing meals for state banquets and rituals held in the palace.

Surrounding a large well, itself provided with a roof and from which numerous eating utensils have been excavated, stood a group of buildings used as offices and storehouses. The first inscribed wooden tablet recovered from the palace site was found in 1961 in a rubbish pit belonging to this office.

=== Latter audience hall ===
The latter audience hall dates to the time after the capital was re-established after the relocation from Shigaraki.

Traces of the platforms of the latter audience hall and the eastern state halls had remained by the Meiji era, which led to the discovery of the site by Sekino Tadashi, a researcher of architecture history. Tanada Kajuro, a local gardener, worked on a public movement for protection of the site.

The area on the north side of the latter audience hall is the site of the imperial domicile.

=== Imperial Domicile ===
The emperor and empress lived, worked, and received visitors in the imperial domicile section. It was surrounded by a roofed walkway, divided lengthwise by an earthen wall. The Office of the Court Ladies was also located here.

Inside the imperial domicile was a stone-paved area containing a large well, of which remains were found in 1973. The well was lined with a solid cedar tube carved from a log 1.7 meters (5 ft 7 in) in diameter. The water from this well was probably for the exclusive use of the emperor and empress. The site was reburied and the wall was reconstructed with new materials as an outdoor exhibit.

=== Office of the Imperial Household ===
In this section to the east of the imperial domicile, is what is thought to have been the Office of the Imperial Household (宮内省, Kunai-shō). It was surrounded by an earthen wall, 90 meters in length to the north and south and 50 meters wide from east to west. Six buildings stood in this compound. The main one was roofed with tiles, the others with cypress bark.

The building were reconstructed in accordance with the findings of the archaeological excavations, following the Nara period construction techniques.

=== East Palace Garden ===
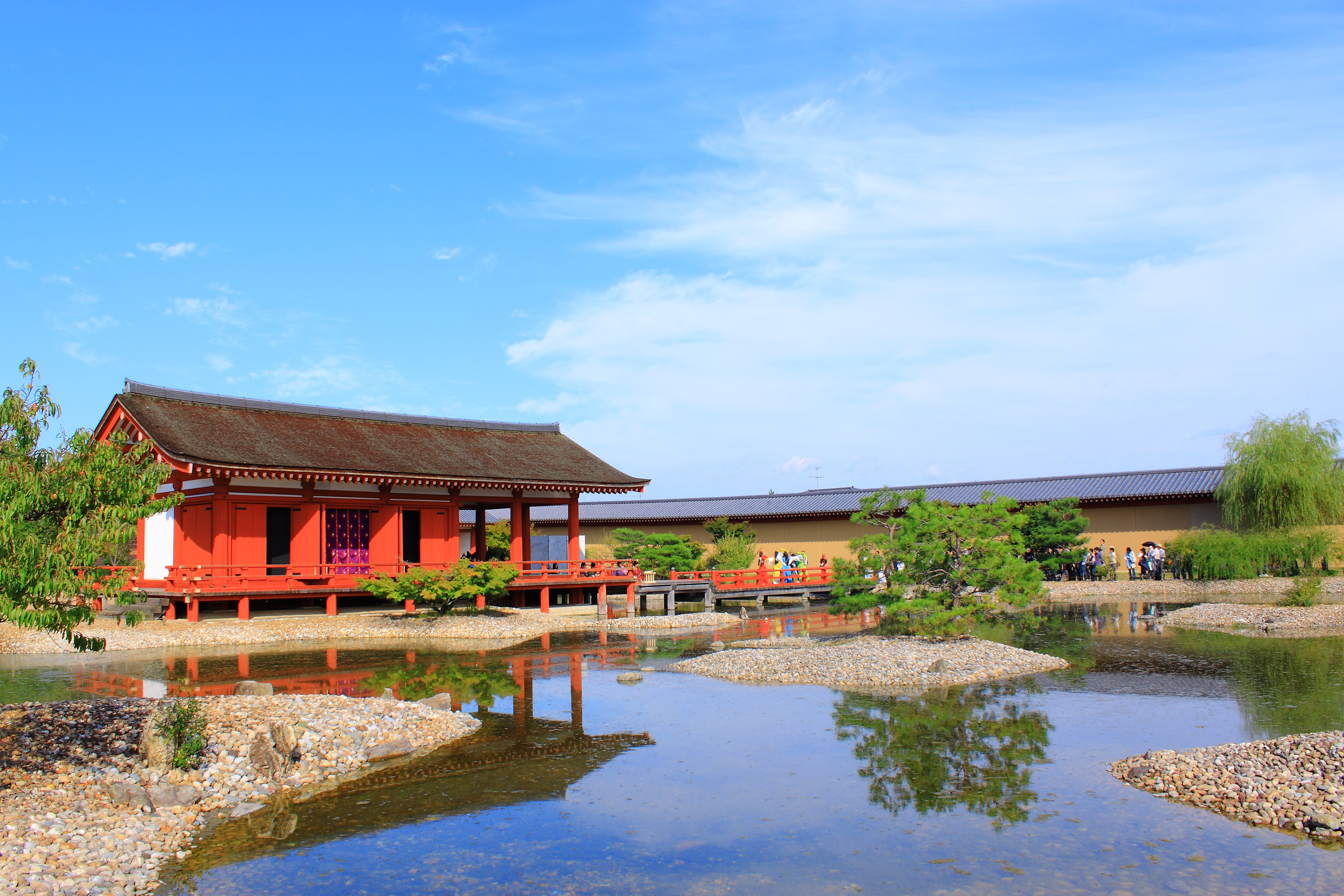
The East Palace Garden

Archaeological excavations uncovered remains of a large garden in the southeast corner of the palace in 1967. This was named "East Palace Garden" (Tōin Teien) because the neighbouring area is considered to be the site of the East Palace.

Within the area measuring 100 by 80 meters (330 by 260 ft), several buildings were located around a curvilinear pond. In the vicinity of the site, Empress Shōtoku had the "Jewelled Hall of the East Palace" constructed, in which banquets were held.

The excavations revealed that the garden was originally built in the Chinese style of the early Nara period, and modified in a Japanese style of the late Nara period. The garden was reconstructed in 1998.

== Museum ==
The Nara National Research Institute for Cultural Properties has conducted research and investigation of the site on a continual basis since 1959. The Nara Palace Site Museum exhibits the results of the excavations. It consists of galleries for the palace and its administrative offices, artifacts, archaeological science, and special exhibitions.

== Transport ==
It takes 15 or 20 minutes to walk from Yamato-Saidaiji Station to Heijō Palace. And between May and August in 2010, the free shuttle bus runs between Yamato-Saidaiji Station, JR Nara Station and Heijō Palace every 10 or 15 minutes.

== See also ==
- Kyūseki Teien, a garden located at Sakyo Sanjo Nibo constructed around the same time
- Heian Palace
- List of Special Places of Scenic Beauty, Special Historic Sites and Special Natural Monuments
