= Suzakumon =

Coordinates: 35°0′49″N 135°44′32″E

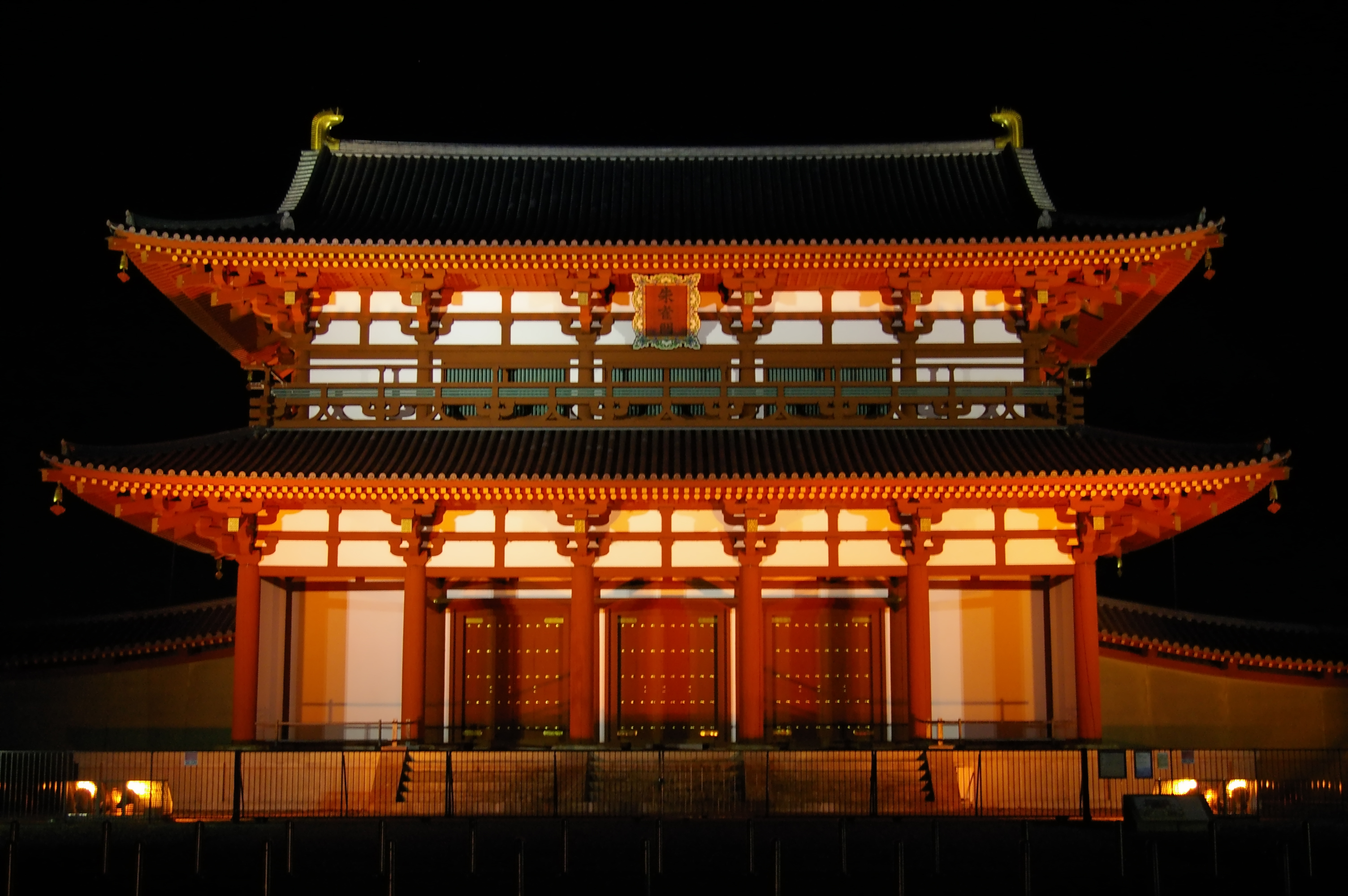
The reconstructed Suzakumon of Heijō Palace at night

The Suzakumon (朱雀門, Suzakumon or Shujakumon) was the main gate built in the center of the south end of the imperial palaces in the Japanese ancient capitals of Fujiwara-kyō (Kashihara), Heijō-kyō (Nara), and later Heian-kyō (Kyoto). The placement followed the ancient Chinese palace model requirements at the time, where Suzaku (朱雀, Suzaku), the Vermilion Bird, was the Guardian of the South.

It was said to be the site where foreign dignitaries were received by the Emperor. All of them were destroyed centuries ago along with the respective imperial residences of their capitals.

== Nara Suzakumon ==
In 1993, it was decided that the gate of Nara would be reconstructed. It proved extremely difficult to work out what the Suzakumon had looked like, as there were no surviving structural remnants. A conjectural model was developed, based on comparable architecture elsewhere, and the new gate was constructed from a mixture of traditional building materials (Japanese cypress wood and tiles) and concrete, in order to resist earthquakes. The reconstructed gate was opened in 1998.

Most of the gate was constructed by the Takenaka Corporation.

== See also ==
- Heijō Palace
- Rashōmon in Kyoto
