= Kujō Michinori =

Kujō Michinori (九条 道教; 1315–1349), son of Moronori with Imperial Prince Moriyoshi's daughter and adopted son of Fusazane, was a kugyō or Japanese court noble of the Kamakura period (1185–1333). He held a regent position kampaku in 1342. He married Oomiya Suehira's daughter. Tsunenori was his adopted son.
