= Kurōdo-dokoro =

Japanese imperial archive office

- 蔵人所

Agency overview
- Formed: 810 AD
- Dissolved: 1868 (effectively) / 1885 (officially)
- Jurisdiction: Imperial Court of Japan
- Headquarters: Heian-kyō (Kyoto)
- Agency executives: Bettō (Chancellor), Usually held by a Fujiwara leader; Kurōdo no Tō (Head Chamberlain), Manager of daily affairs
- Parent agency: Emperor of Japan

The Kurōdo-dokoro (蔵人所), also read as Kurando-dokoro and often translated as the Chamberlain's office, was an organ of the imperial Japanese government established in 810 by Emperor Saga. It was set up outside of the statutory government structure described in the ritsuryō code and was placed directly under the emperor's authority. Its original responsibility was to take care of the emperor's archives and imperial documents as well as to attend to various personal needs of the sovereign. However, over the course of the 9th century, the office's role and responsibilities expanded considerably, and by the end of the 9th century it had become a clear control point within the government. Through it the emperor was, for a while, able to exercise his direct influence over the bureaucracy. At the same time the emperor's conduct of official business through the Chamberlain's usurped much of the power and functions of the statutory Council of State (太政官, daijō-kan).
