= Akio =

- Gender: Male

Origin
- Origin: Japanese
- Meaning: Different meanings depending on the kanji used

Akio (written: 昭雄, 昭夫, 昭生, 昭男, 明雄, 明夫, 明生, 章雄, 章夫, 章男, 章央, 彰朗, 彰生, 秋雄, 秋夫, 秋男, 陽生, 晶夫 or あきお in hiragana) is a masculine Japanese given name. Notable people with the name include:

- Akio Arakawa (1927–2021), Japanese-American climate scientist
- Akio Chen (born 1956), Taiwanese actor
- Akio Chiba (ちば あきお; 1943–1984), Japanese manga artist
- Akio Fujimoto (藤元明緒; born 1988), Japanese film director
- Akio Fukuda (福田 昭夫; born 1948), Japanese politician
- Akio Hattori (服部 晶夫; 1929–2013), Japanese mathematician
- Akio Hong (born 1969), Chinese travel writer, broadcaster, television host, and columnist
- Akio Inoue (井上 秋緒), Japanese lyricist
- Akio Ishii (石井 昭男, born 1955), Japanese baseball player
- Akio Ishikawa (石川 陽生; born 1964), Japanese shogi player
- Akio Jissoji (実相寺 昭雄; 1937–2006), Japanese television and film director
- Akio Kakishita (柿下 秋男; born 1953), Japanese rower
- Akio Kaminaga (神永 昭夫; 1936–1993), Japanese judoka
- Akio Kanai (金井 昭雄; born 1942), Japanese optometrist
- Akio Kanemoto (born 1945), Japanese golfer
- Akio Kashiwagi (柏木 昭男; 1938–1992), Japanese businessman and murder victim
- Akio Katayama (片山 章雄; born 1957), Japanese historian
- Akio Kogiku (小菊 昭雄; born 1975), Japanese football manager
- Akio Koizumi (小泉 昭男; born 1945), Japanese politician
- Akio Kudo (born 1947), Japanese field hockey player
- Akio Kuwazawa (桑沢 秋雄; born 1959), Japanese cyclist
- Akio Matsuba (松場 秋夫; born 1914), Japanese naval aviator
- Akio Mimura (三村 明夫; born 1940), Japanese businessman
- Akio Minakami (born 1948), Japanese karateka
- Akio Miyazawa (宮沢 章夫; 1956–2022), Japanese playwright, writer, and academic
- Akio Mizuta (水田 章雄; born 1973), Japanese baseball player
- Akio Mori (森 昭雄; born 1947), Japanese physiologist and writer
- Akio Morimoto (森本晃生; born 1960), Japanese racing driver
- Akio Morita (盛田 昭夫; 1921–1999), Japanese businessman
- Akio Johnson Mutek (1958–2013), South Sudanese Roman Catholic bishop
- Akio Nakamori (中森 明夫; born 1960), Japanese writer
- Akio Nohira (野平 明雄; 1937–2015), Japanese table tennis player
- Akio Nojima (野島 昭生; born 1945), Japanese voice actor, actor and narrator
- Akio Ohta (born 1984), Japanese speed skater
- Akio Ōtsuka (大塚 明夫; born 1959), Japanese actor and voice actor
- Akio Saito (斉藤 明雄; born 1955), Japanese baseball player
- Akio Sasajima (笹島 明夫; born 1952), Japanese jazz guitarist
- Akio Sasaki (佐々木 彰生; born 1991), Japanese figure skater
- Akio Sato (disambiguation), multiple people
- Akio Shibata (柴田 明雄; born 1981), Japanese boxer
- Akio Sohda (左右田 秋雄; 1909–?), Japanese field hockey player
- Akio Sugino (杉野 昭夫; born 1944), Japanese character designer
- Akio Suyama (陶山 章央; born 1968), Japanese voice actor
- Akio Suzuki (鈴木 章夫; 1929–2010), Japanese surgeon, medical scientist and educator
- Akio Takamori (1950–2017), Japanese-American sculptor
- Akio Takashima (born 1942), Japanese field hockey player
- Akio Tamashiro, Peruvian karateka
- Akio Toyoda (豊田 章男; born 1956), president and CEO of Toyota Motor Corporation
- Tsurugamine Akio (鶴ヶ嶺 昭男; 1929–2006), Japanese sumo wrestler
- Akio Usami (宇佐美 彰朗; born 1943), Japanese long-distance runner
- Akio Watanabe (渡辺 明夫; born 1969), Japanese animator
- Akio Yashiro (矢代 秋雄; 1929–1976), Japanese composer
- Akio Yasuraoka (安良岡 章夫; born 1958), Japanese classical composer
- Akio Yoshida (吉田 明生; born 1986), Japanese footballer

== Fictional characters ==
- Akio Ogino (荻野 明夫), Chihiro's father in Spirited Away
- Akio Yabe (矢部 明夫), a recurring character in the Power Pros baseball video game series

== Other people ==
- Jimmy Yang, American wrestler who used Akio as his ring name
