= Ishi (disambiguation) =

Ishi (c. 1861–1916) was an American Indian thought to be the last of the Yahi tribe.

Ishi may also refer to:

- Eshraque "iSHi" Mughal (born 1981), Swedish music producer and songwriter
- India State Hunger Index
- Ishi (chair), a type of chair used at the Japanese imperial court
- Ishi Press, Japanese publishing company focused on the game Go
- Ishi: The Last of His Tribe, TV-film on the Indian Ishi, 1978
- Ishi Wilderness, Yahi tribe lands, now a wilderness area located in the Lassen National Forest

== See also ==
- Ishi Myishi, a fictional character from the Eoin Colfer novels The Wish List (2001) and The Fowl Twins (2019)
- Ishii, Japanese surname
