= Yasuraoka =

Yasuraoka (written: 安良岡) is a Japanese surname. Notable people with the surname include:

- Akio Yasuraoka (安良岡 章夫, born 1958), Japanese classical composer
- Yuji Yasuraoka (安良岡 裕二, born 1971), Japanese professional wrestler
