= 明生 =

明生, meaning "bright, birth", is an Asian given name.

It may refer to:

- Akio, Japanese masculine given name
- Meisei Chikara (明生 力; born 1995), Japanese professional sumo wrestler
- Yang Mingsheng (杨明生; born 1955), governor of Agricultural Bank of China (2003–2007)

== See also ==
- The dictionary definition of 明 at Wiktionary
- The dictionary definition of 生 at Wiktionary
