= Takamikura =

Ceremonial imperial seat used by the Emperor of Japan

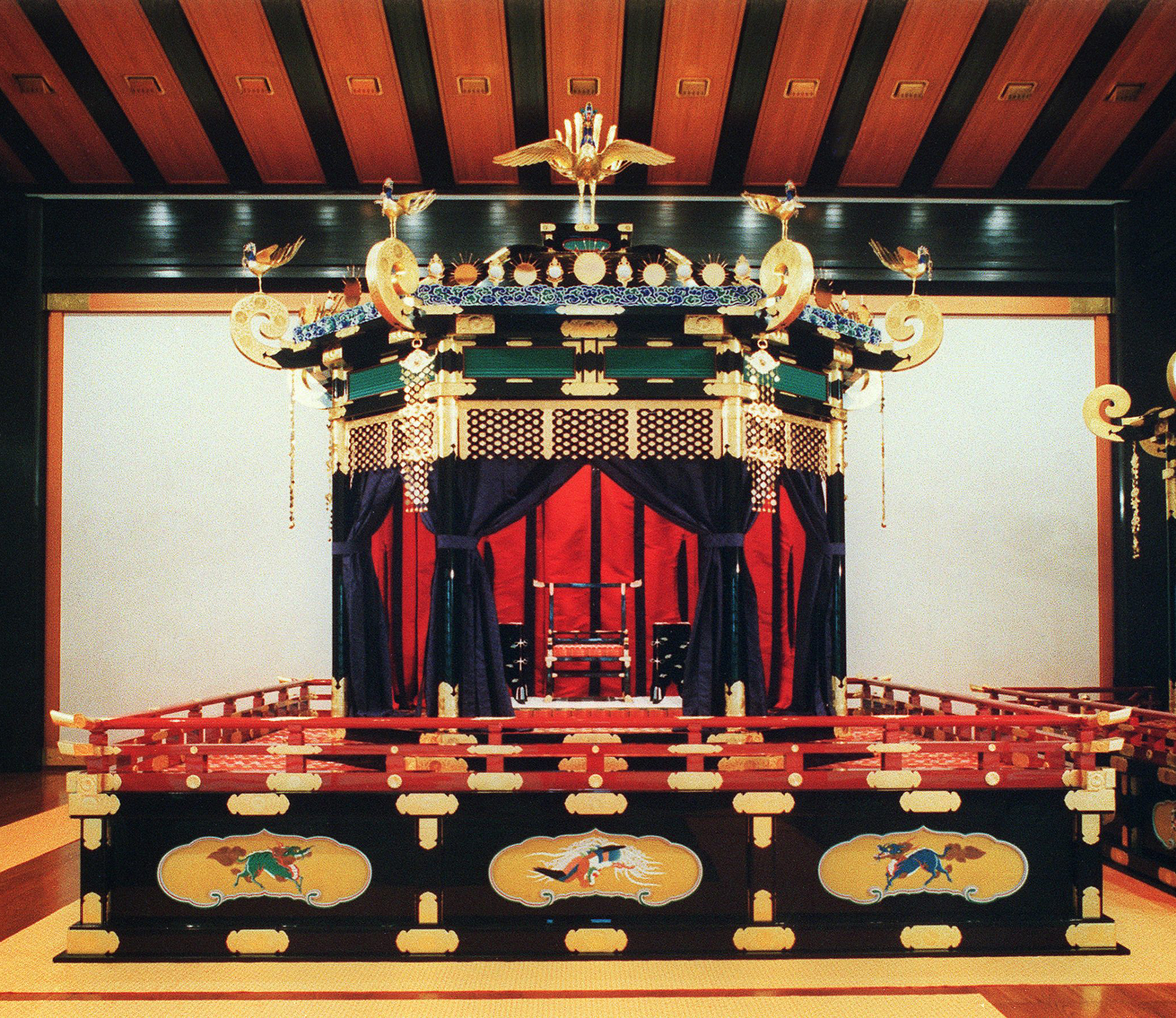
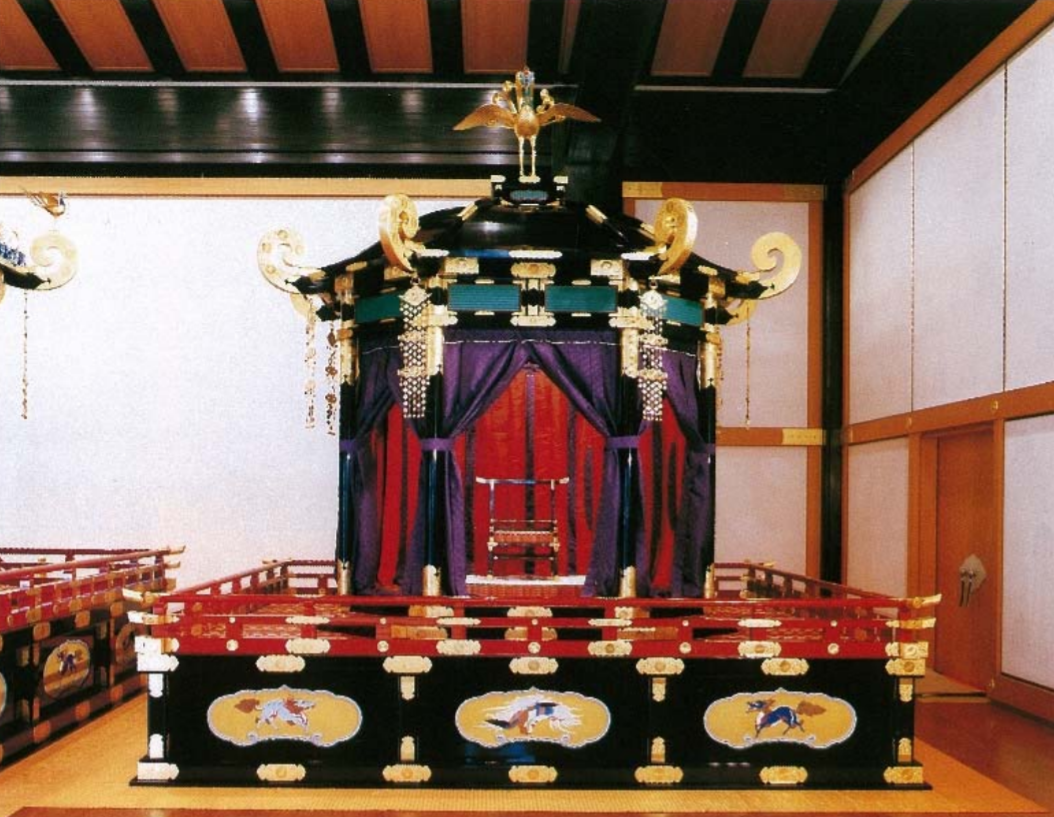
The Takamikura (top) and Michōdai (bottom)

The Takamikura (高御座) is the ceremonial seat of the Emperor of Japan, used most notably at the enthronement ceremony and, historically, at other major court ceremonies such as chōga, the formal New Year's audience. The Japanese term Takamikura is commonly rendered in English as "imperial throne", but it does not denote only the chair or other seat on which the emperor sits. Since antiquity, the Takamikura has been organized around a raised platform for the emperor's seat, together with architectural and textile elements such as pillars, curtains and a canopy. The seat itself took various forms depending on period and ceremony, including floor-level seating, a daishōji (a low, bench-like platform), and an imperial chair (go-ishi). Scholars have debated whether, in antiquity, the pillars, canopy and other elements above the platform were normally kept in place or assembled for individual ceremonies.

In ancient Japan, the Takamikura was erected in major ceremonial halls of the imperial palace complex, including the Daigokuden (Great Hall of State) and the Burakuden, the principal hall of the Buraku-in. It was used for state ceremonies including enthronements, New Year's audiences, and sechie (formal court assemblies and banquets). The enthronement proclamation of Emperor Monmu, issued on the 17th day of the eighth month of 697, contains the expression Amatsu hitsugi takamikura no waza (天津日嗣高御座之業). After the Daigokuden of the Heian Palace was destroyed by fire in 1177, the Takamikura was set up on a reduced scale at other locations, including the Shishinden in the inner palace (dairi) and the government compound of the Daijō-kan (Council of State). From the later medieval period onward, imperial enthronements were held in the Shishinden of the imperial residence in Kyoto. In the early modern period, the Takamikura was used not only for enthronements but also for court banquets following the Daijō-sai, after that ceremony was revived.

The present Takamikura consists of a square black-lacquered base platform and an octagonal, pavilion-like superstructure erected upon it. Inside is the go-ishi, on which the emperor sits. The roof is surmounted by phoenix ornaments, and the structure is further adorned with mirrors, jeweled banners and curtains. Together with the adjacent Michōdai, the corresponding ceremonial seat used by the empress, it was constructed for the enthronement of Emperor Taishō in 1915. For the enthronements of Emperor Akihito in 1990 and Emperor Naruhito in 2019, the Takamikura and Michōdai were transported from the Kyoto Imperial Palace to the Tokyo Imperial Palace, where they were used in the principal enthronement ceremony, the Sokuirei-Seiden-no-gi. They are normally housed in the Shishinden of the Kyoto Imperial Palace.

== History ==
=== Ancient period ===
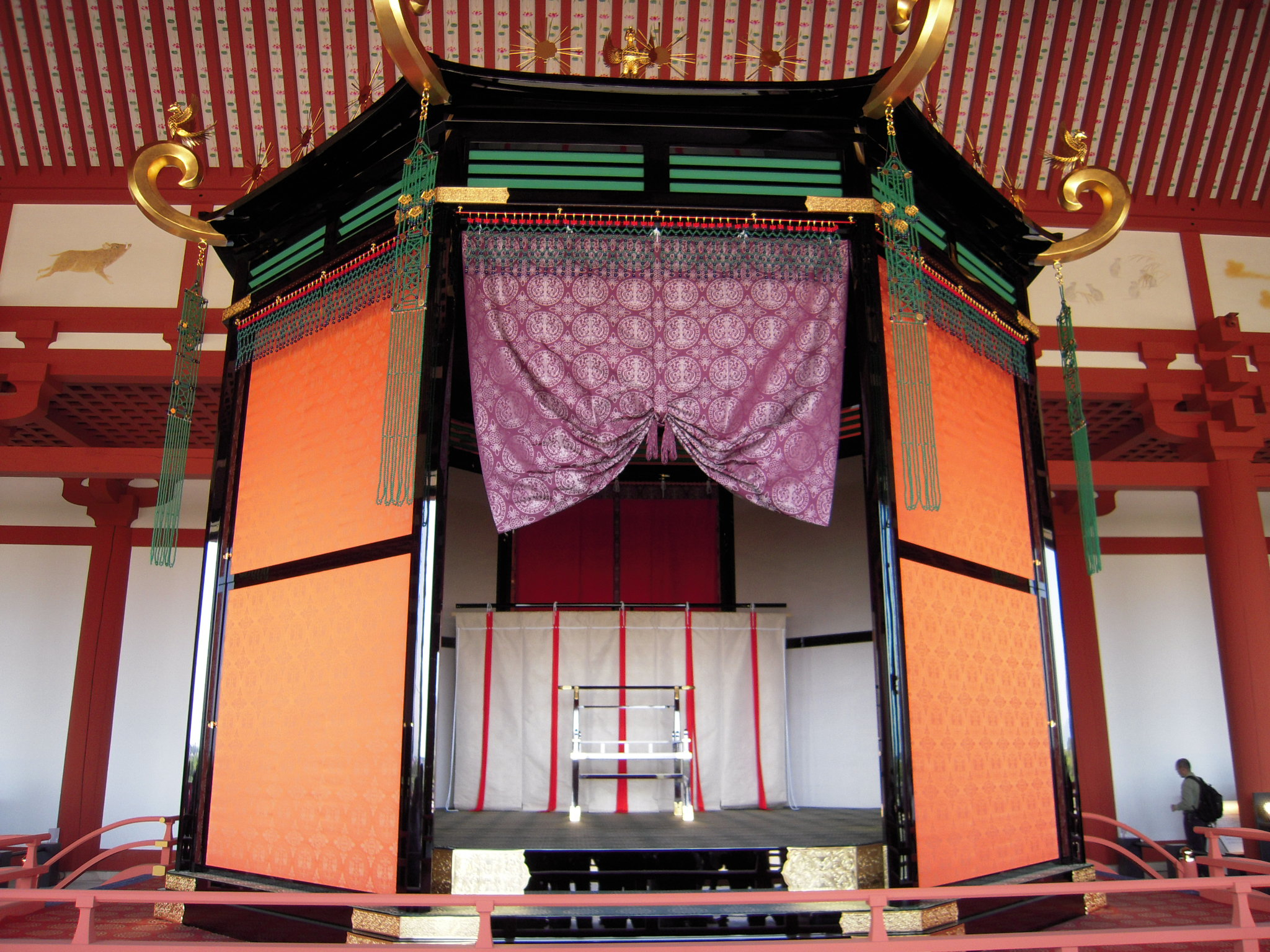
A reconstructed Takamikura in the First Daigokuden at the Heijō Palace site

In ancient Japan, the Takamikura was used for ceremonies held in the Daigokuden (Great Hall of State), including enthronements and chōga (formal New Year's audiences), and for sechie (formal court assemblies and banquets) held in the Burakuden. In the Heian Palace, Takamikura were installed not only in the Daigokuden and Burakuden but also in the Butokuden. The enthronement proclamation of Emperor Monmu, issued on the 17th day of the eighth month of 697, contains the expression Amatsu hitsugi takamikura no waza (天津日嗣高御座之業), an early attestation of the term Takamikura.

From the mid-seventh to the early eighth century, octagonal kofun began to appear among royal and imperial tombs. Danno-zuka Kofun, identified as the tomb of Emperor Jomei; Gobyōno Kofun, the tomb of Emperor Tenji; Noguchi no Ō no Haka Kofun, the joint tomb of Emperor Tenmu and Empress Jitō; and Nakao-yama Kofun, identified as the tomb of Emperor Monmu, are all octagonal burial mounds. Kengoshizuka Kofun, which excavations in 2010 confirmed to be octagonal, has also been proposed as the joint tomb of Empress Saimei and Princess Hashihito.

Some scholars have suggested a connection between the octagonal plan of these tombs and the octagonal form of the Takamikura. In later documentary sources, the Takamikura is described as consisting of a square lower platform and octagonal middle and upper platforms, leading to the suggestion that octagonal tombs may have been modeled on its form.

Another interpretation links the octagonal form of the Takamikura to a conception of imperial rulership in which the emperor governed the "eight directions of heaven and earth". The "eight directions" comprise the four cardinal and four intercardinal directions and have been understood as symbolizing rule extending throughout the entire realm. Comparable symbolic uses of the number eight appear in expressions such as 八隅知之, invoking rule over the "eight corners", and 大八洲 ("Great Eight Islands"), a traditional designation for the Japanese archipelago. The octagonal form of the Takamikura has accordingly been interpreted as a visual expression of the emperor's rule over the whole country.

=== Heian and medieval periods ===
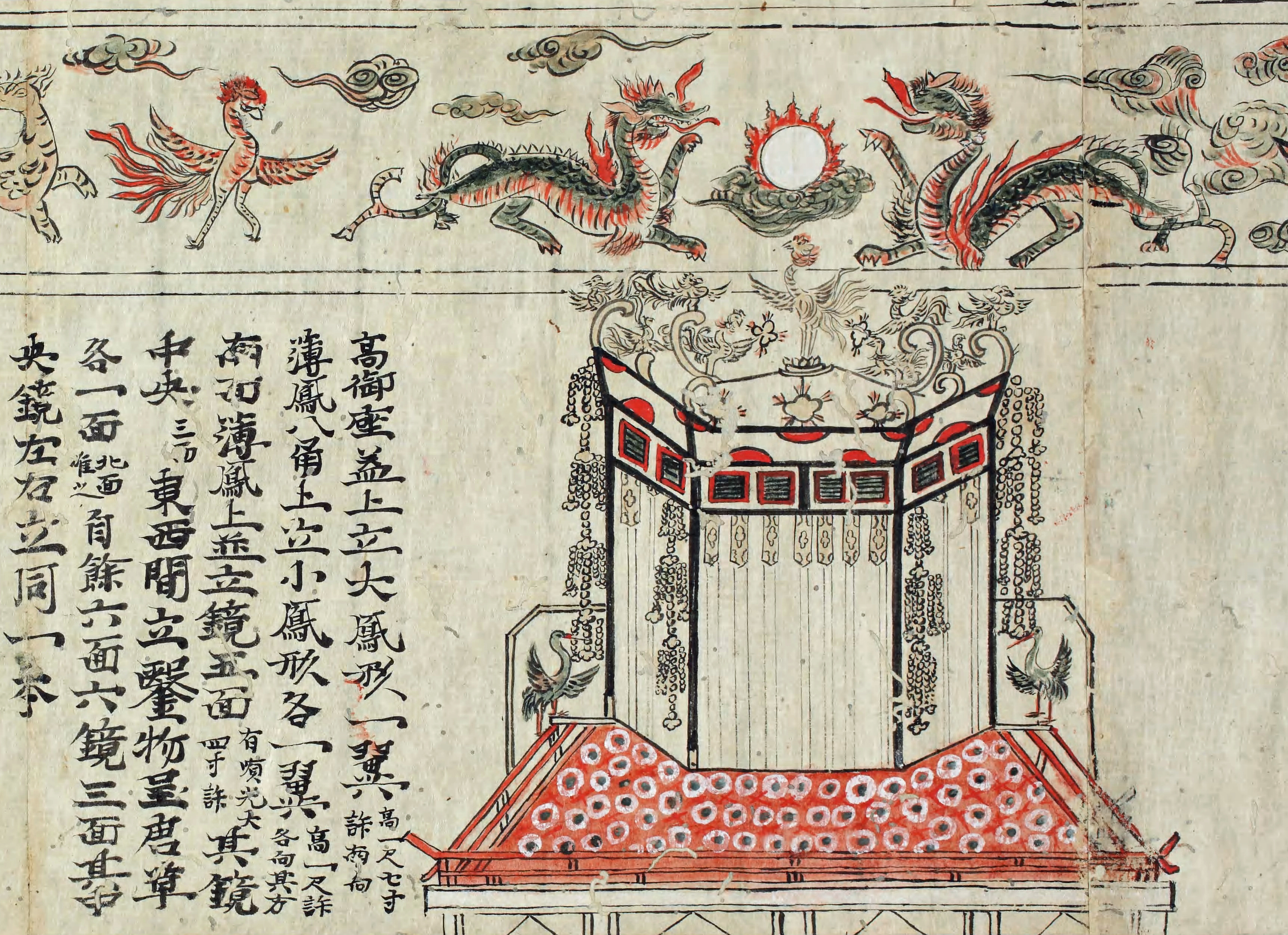
The Takamikura depicted in the Sokui Shōzoku Ezu, a manuscript from the Muromachi period. Its archetype is thought to have been produced for the enthronement of Emperor Konoe in 1141.

Illustrations of the Takamikura survive that are thought to preserve the form used at enthronement ceremonies in the late Heian period (794–1185). The Kujō manuscript of the Sokui Shōzoku Ezu, held by the Archives and Mausolea Department of the Imperial Household Agency, is a two-scroll manuscript copied during the Muromachi period (1336–1573). It depicts the Takamikura together with furnishings, costumes and other objects used in enthronement ceremonies. The manuscript belongs to a group of related texts, including the work conventionally known as the Bun'an Gosokui Chōdozu, that are thought to derive from a common archetype. Study of its colophon and related manuscripts suggests that this archetype formed part of a supplementary record in an unidentified diary compiled in connection with the enthronement of Emperor Konoe in 1141. It has further been suggested that the author of this supplementary record was probably Fujiwara no Yorinaga, who was then serving as naidaijin (Minister of the Center).

After the Daigokuden of the Heian Palace was destroyed by fire in 1177, the Takamikura was set up on a reduced scale in other locations, including the Shishinden in the inner palace (dairi) and the government compound of the Daijō-kan (Council of State). During the medieval period, the Daijō-kan compound served as the venue for enthronement ceremonies, and this arrangement continued through the reign of Emperor Go-Tsuchimikado. After the Ōnin War, however, the compound fell into disrepair. For the enthronement of Emperor Go-Kashiwabara, the Shishinden of the imperial residence in Kyoto was therefore ceremonially treated as the main hall of the Daijō-kan compound. Thereafter, enthronement ceremonies were held in the Shishinden through the enthronement of Emperor Shōwa.

==== Attendance of regents and imperial mothers on the platform ====
At the enthronement of a child emperor, a regent could attend the emperor on the platform of the Takamikura to assist him; from the enthronement of Emperor Horikawa in 1086 onward, this became customary. At the enthronement of Emperor Toba in 1107, the regent Fujiwara no Tadazane took his place on a round mat at the northeastern (ushi-tora) corner of the middle tier of the Takamikura and, following the precedent of 1086, presented fruit to the emperor.

In the case of Emperor Toba, who was enthroned at the age of five in 1107, Princess Reishi, who had been designated as Toba's junbo (honorary mother) to fulfill the ritual role of an imperial mother, rode in the same imperial palanquin as the emperor and ascended the Takamikura with him. The Gosokui Shidai (Order of the Enthronement Ceremony), compiled for Toba's enthronement, also prescribed the procedure to be followed when an imperial mother was present: the empress serving in that role was to proceed to the Daigokuden and then take her seat within the curtained area on the western side of the Takamikura. As a precedent, the text quotes the Chōwaki: 母后同御高座、以三尺几帳隔之, recording an instance in which the imperial mother occupied the Takamikura together with the emperor, with the two separated by a three-shaku (approximately 90 cm) kichō, a portable curtained screen.

==== Sokui kanjō (enthronement consecration) ====
The Gosokui Shidai, compiled for the enthronement of Emperor Toba in 1107, discusses earlier precedents for esoteric Buddhist mudras in connection with the procedure for ascending the Takamikura. In describing the enthronement of Emperor Go-Sanjō in 1068, it records that the emperor formed a mudra resembling the "fist mudra of Vairocana". It also cites another precedent in which the emperor first ascended the Takamikura at an auspicious time and then formed a mudra.

Emperor Go-Sanjō's use of a mudra has traditionally been regarded as evidence relating to the origins of the later practice of sokui kanjō, an esoteric Buddhist consecration associated with imperial enthronement. There is, however, no confirmed instance of the same procedure being performed after his reign. The earliest securely attested instance of sokui kanjō involving the transmission of mudras and mantras from the Fujiwara regental house to the emperor is generally considered to be that of Emperor Fushimi in the late Kamakura period.

=== Early modern period ===
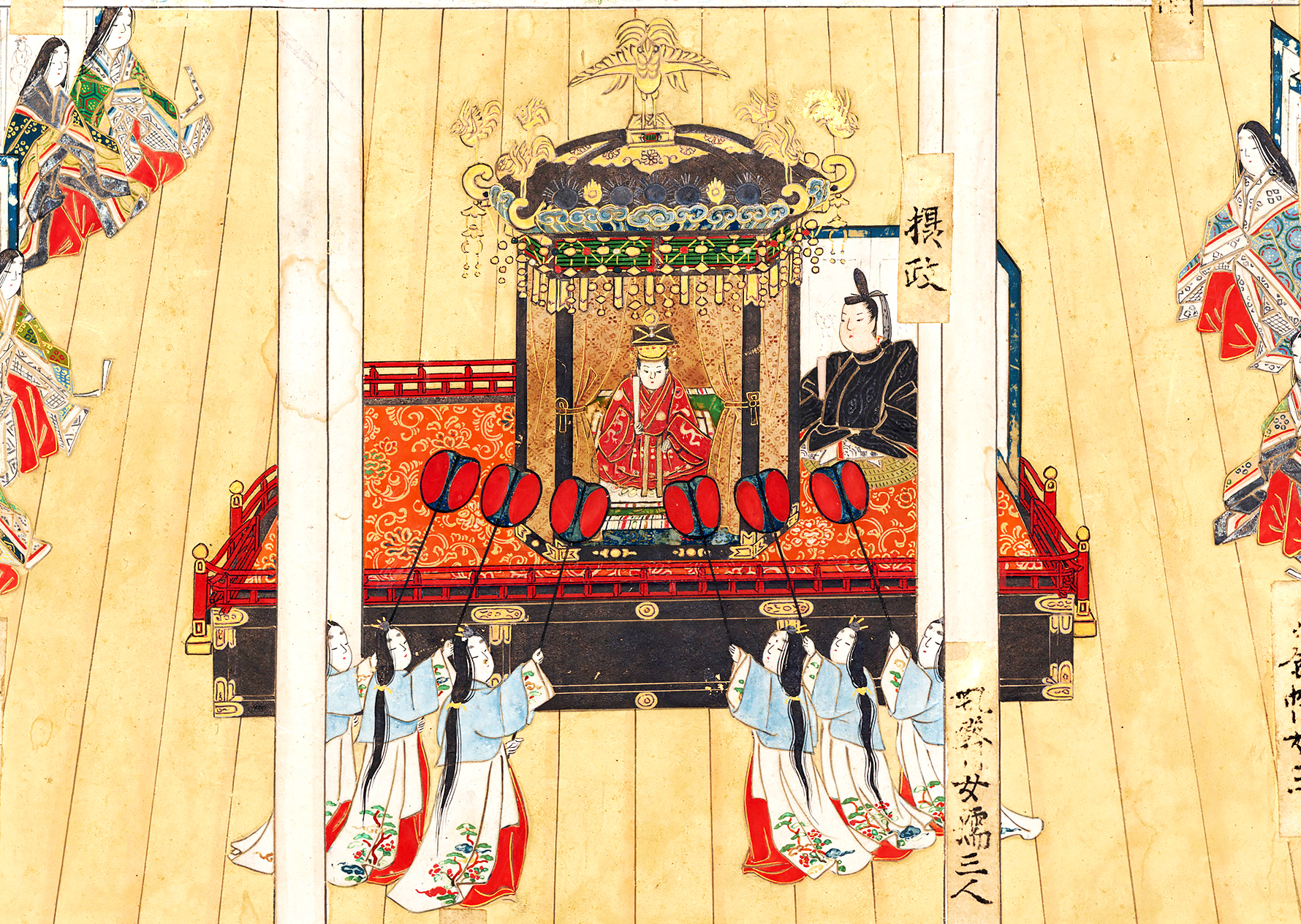
Right-hand screen of Enthronement of Emperor Reigen; Abdication of Emperor Go-Sai. Emperor Reigen is shown seated within the Takamikura (Kanō Einō, 17th century, collection of the Kyoto National Museum).

The enthronement of Emperor Reigen, held on the 27th day of the fourth month of 1663, is depicted in a pair of folding screens titled Enthronement of Emperor Reigen; Abdication of Emperor Go-Sai, painted by Kanō Einō. The right-hand screen shows Reigen seated within the Takamikura in the Shishinden, wearing a benkan crown and a red kon'e ceremonial robe. The scene represents the climax of the enthronement ceremony, when the newly enthroned emperor, previously concealed behind ceremonial fans held by court ladies, was revealed. Among surviving folding-screen paintings of enthronement ceremonies, the work is considered exceptional in presenting a clear frontal view of the emperor.

In the early modern period, the Takamikura was used not only for enthronements but also for sechie held after the Daijō-sai. The Daijō-e, the broader cycle of rites centered on the Daijō-sai, was revived for Emperor Higashiyama in 1687 after an interruption of about 220 years. At first, however, it was observed in a simplified form: the Tatsu-no-hi sechie and Mi-no-hi sechie (banquets held on the Days of the Dragon and Snake in the traditional calendar) were omitted, and only the Toyonoakari-no-sechie, the final banquet, was held. At the Daijō-e of Emperor Kōkaku in 1787, new adjoining platforms (tsugidan) were constructed to the east and west of the Takamikura and connected to it as part of the imperial seating arrangement for the Tatsu-no-hi and Mi-no-hi sechie. The Yuki and Suki Michōdai (curtained ceremonial seats), associated with the two ritually designated provinces that supplied the sacred grain for the Daijō-sai, were placed on these platforms. The ceremonial arrangement was also changed from the western-precedence form then in recent use to the older eastern-precedence form.

The Takamikura was destroyed in the Great Tenmei fire of 1788. The first enthronement ceremony held after the fire was that of Emperor Ninkō in 1817. A new Takamikura was constructed for this enthronement.

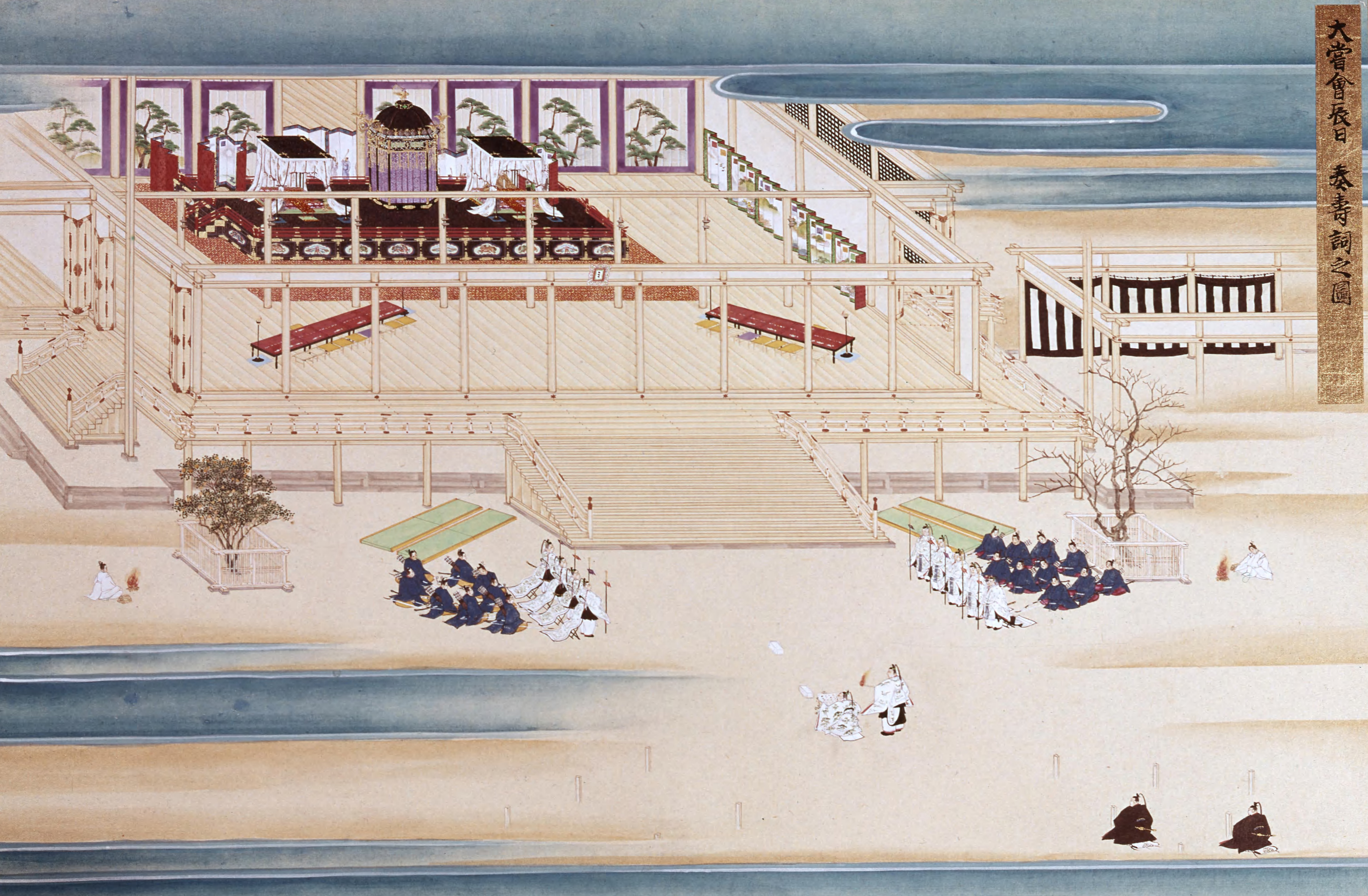
The Takamikura and the Yuki and Suki Michōdai at the Tatsu-no-hi sechie of the Daijō-e. The adjoining platforms for the two Michōdai are shown connected to the east and west sides of the Takamikura (illustration appended to the Kujigiroku, completed in 1887).

At Emperor Ninkō's Daijō-e in 1818, the same Takamikura that had been used for his enthronement was employed. For the Tatsu-no-hi and Mi-no-hi sechie, the platforms supporting the Yuki and Suki Michōdai were connected to the east and west sides of the Takamikura platform. For the Toyonoakari-no-sechie on the final day, the two Michōdai were removed and only the Takamikura was used. The tsugidan supporting the Takamikura measured approximately 1 jō 9 shaku (5.8 m) east–west, 1 jō 7 shaku (5.2 m) north–south, and 3 shaku (0.9 m) high. Its sides were decorated with qilin, with a phoenix depicted at the center of the southern face. During the Tatsu-no-hi and Mi-no-hi sechie, tatami mats and cushions were layered inside the Takamikura to form the imperial seat. For the Toyonoakari-no-sechie, the furnishings were rearranged and a go-ishi decorated in hyōmon metal inlay was installed.

The same arrangement combining the Takamikura with the Yuki and Suki Michōdai was followed at the Daijō-e of Emperor Kōmei in 1848, although the platforms for the two Michōdai were widened to match the width of the Takamikura platform. The design of these platforms was worked out with reference to the Daidairi Zukōshō, including the text of the Gishiki reproduced in that work and reconstruction drawings based on the Hokuzanshō, as well as an interpretation based on the Chōwa 1 Daijō-e ki (Record of the Daijō-e of 1012). The specifications were determined with the Daijō-e sechie formerly held in the Heian-period Burakuden as the ideal model, while taking into account the actual dimensions of the Shishinden.

In the great fire that destroyed the Kyoto Imperial Palace in 1854, both the Takamikura and its tsugidan were destroyed.

=== Meiji period and later ===
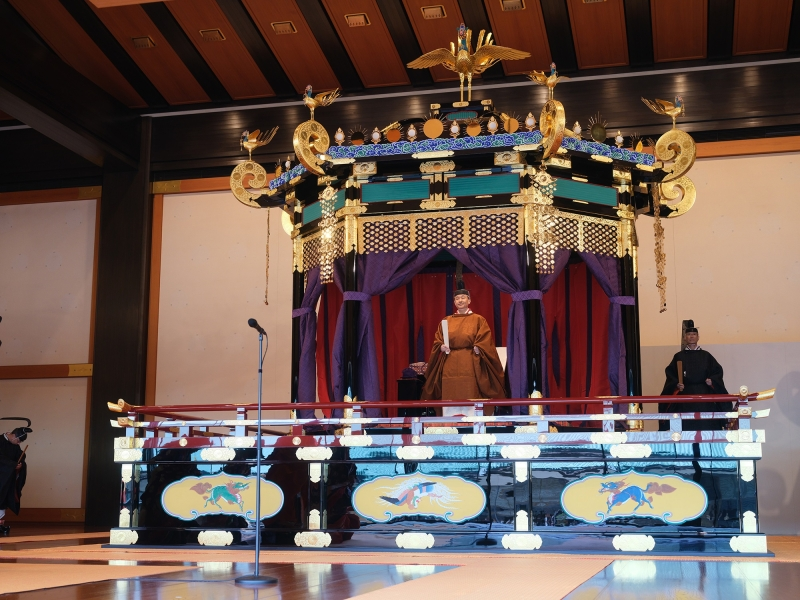
Emperor Naruhito on the Takamikura during the Sokuirei-Seiden-no-gi (Ceremony of the Enthronement at the Seiden), 22 October 2019

At the enthronement of Emperor Meiji, held on the 27th day of the eighth month of 1868, the Takamikura had not yet been reconstructed following its destruction in the fire of 1854. The Michōdai permanently installed in the Shishinden was therefore used as a substitute for the Takamikura. This Michōdai was square in plan, unlike the octagonal Michōdai now used as the empress's ceremonial seat. Components of the platforms that had supported the Yuki and Suki Michōdai at Emperor Kōmei's Daijō-e were reused for the tsugidan beneath it.

At Emperor Meiji's enthronement, the imperial seat itself was also changed from the traditional floor-level arrangement to one using a go-ishi (imperial chair).

The extant Takamikura and the present Michōdai were constructed for the enthronement of Emperor Taishō and used at the ceremony in 1915. The tsugidan of the extant Takamikura shares the same basic structure as the platform used at Emperor Meiji's enthronement.

For the enthronement ceremonies of 1990, repairs were made to the lacquer, polychrome decoration, ornamental metal fittings and other parts of the Takamikura. It was transported from the Kyoto Imperial Palace to the Imperial Palace in Tokyo for use in the ceremonies and was returned to the Kyoto Imperial Palace afterward.

For the Sokuirei-Seiden-no-gi of 2019, the Takamikura was again transported from the Kyoto Imperial Palace to the Imperial Palace in Tokyo and, together with the Michōdai, installed in the Matsu-no-Ma state room of the Seiden for the ceremony.

== Structure and form ==
=== Present-day Takamikura ===
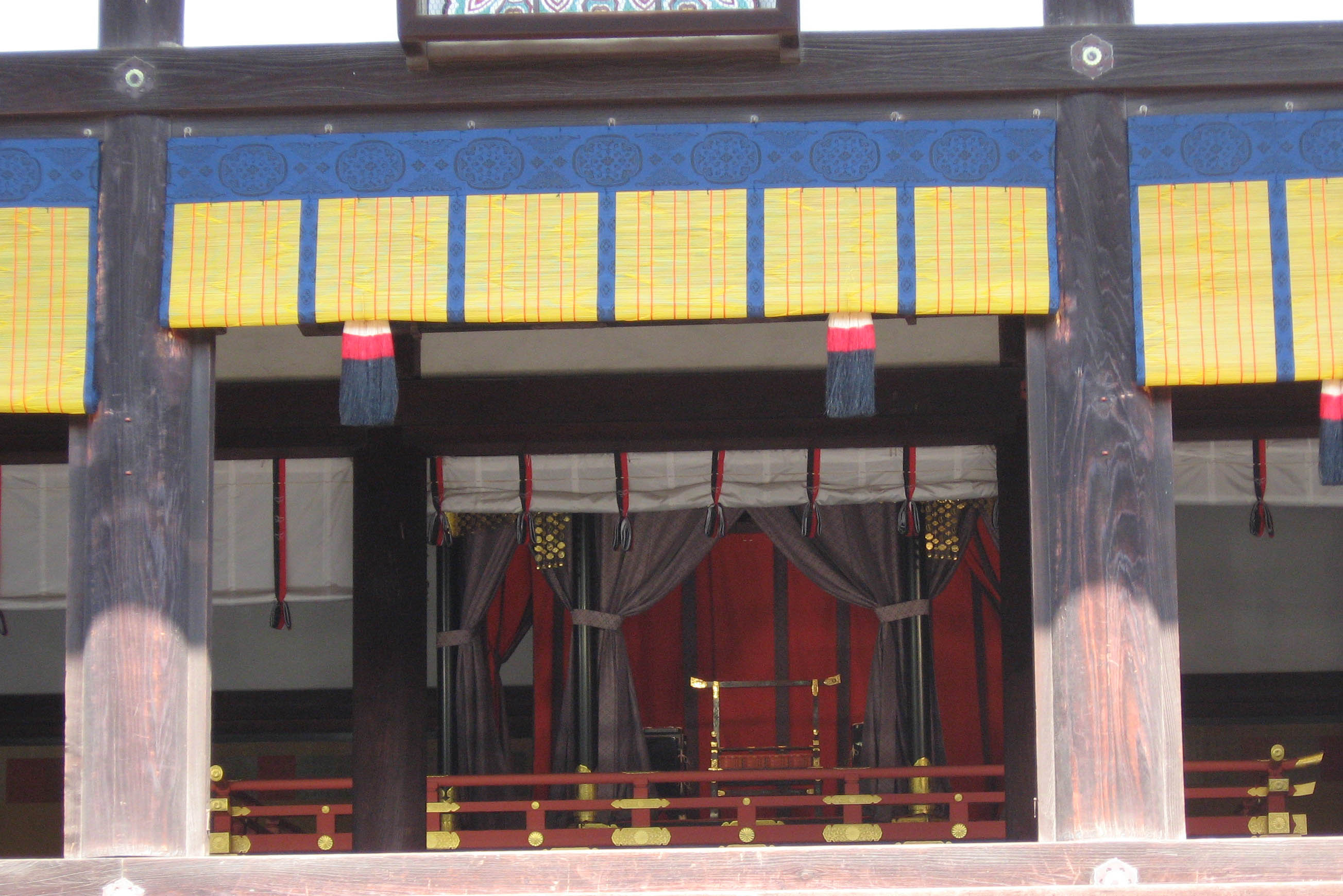
The present Takamikura housed in the Shishinden of the Kyoto Imperial Palace

The present Takamikura consists of a square black-lacquered base platform known as the hamayuka and an octagonal, pavilion-like superstructure set upon it. A five-step wooden staircase is provided at the rear of the hamayuka. Its cusped panels are decorated with a phoenix on the central panel at the front and with qilin of varying poses and colors on the other panels. The upper and lower frames and struts are fitted with gilt-bronze ornamental metalwork featuring chrysanthemum motifs, and a vermilion-lacquered balustrade runs around the platform.

The structure rises in three tiers: a square lower tier (the hamayuka), surmounted by elongated octagonal middle and upper tiers. The lower tier measures 6.06 m (19 ft 11 in) across the front and 5.45 m (17 ft 11 in) along the sides. On the middle tier, the distances between opposite sides are 5.55 m (18 ft 3 in) across the front and 3.90 m (12 ft 10 in) along the sides; on the upper tier, they are 4.95 m (16 ft 3 in) and 3.30 m (10 ft 10 in), respectively.

Above the hamayuka, the superstructure comprises the middle and upper tiers, with eight pillars rising from the upper tier to support an octagonal canopy. A large phoenix stands at the top of the canopy, while a smaller phoenix is placed at the end of each of its eight curled finials (warabite). Mirrors and white jewels, likened to the sun and moon, are arranged alternately around the eaves, and jeweled banners decorated with chrysanthemum motifs hang from the warabite. The curtains suspended between the pillars are made of purple figured silk with scarlet linings, and a large circular mirror is mounted at the center of the ceiling inside.

A go-ishi (imperial chair) is placed inside. Two small black-lacquered maki-e tables, one on each side of the chair, are used to hold the sword and jewel, as well as the Privy Seal and State Seal.

=== Ancient and Heian-period Takamikura ===
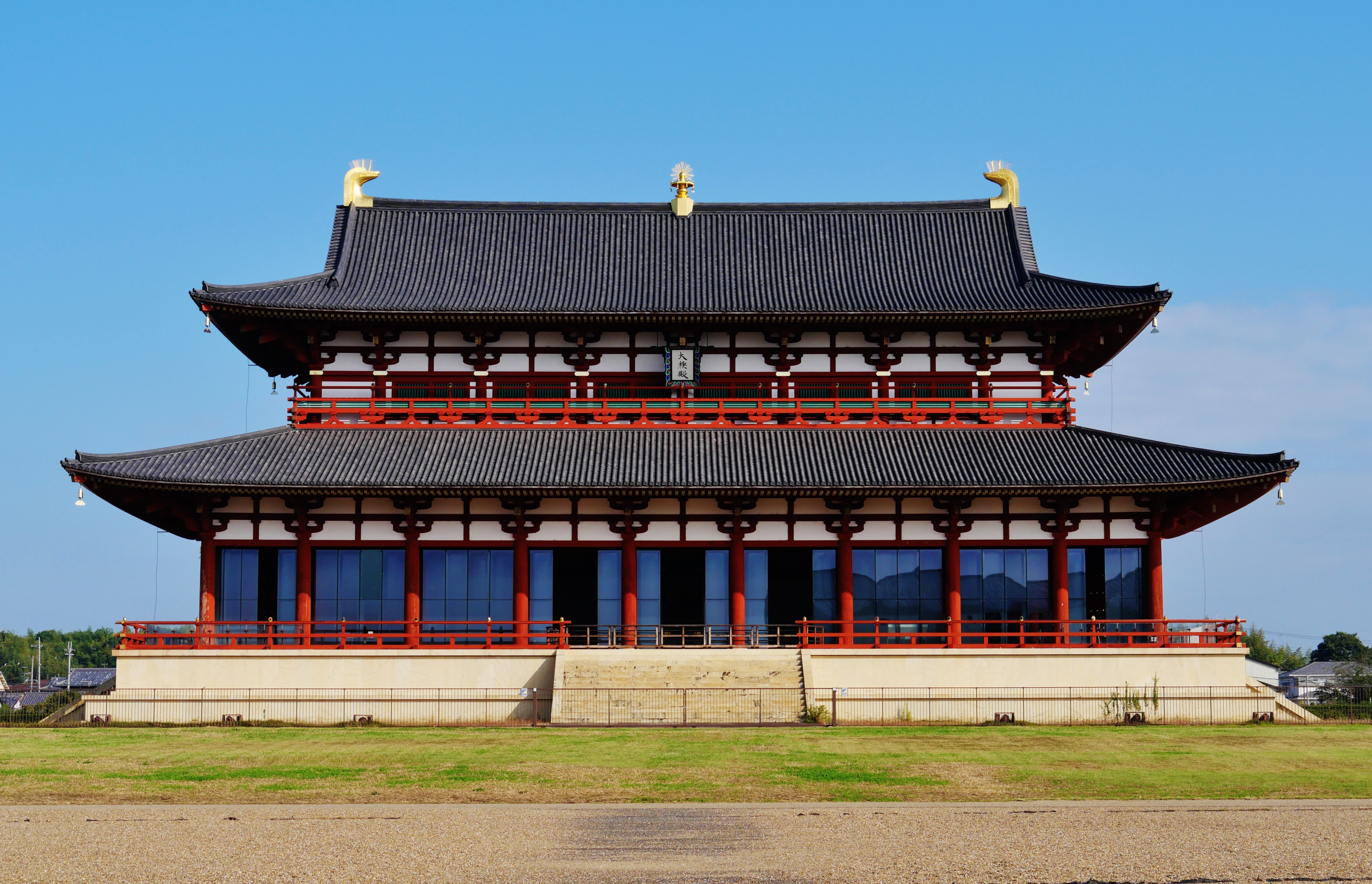
Reconstructed First Daigokuden at the Heijō Palace site, with a reconstructed Takamikura at the center of the hall

In ancient Japan, the Takamikura did not simply mean the chair on which the emperor sat. Rather, it was fundamentally organized around a platform on which the imperial seat was established in ceremonial halls such as the Daigokuden and the Burakuden.

Reconstructions based on records from the period of cloistered rule and other early sources interpret the Takamikura as consisting of three tiers. The lower tier was called the "platform" (dan), the middle tier the doi (or michō doi, "curtain base"), and the upper tier, on which the emperor sat, the Takamikura in the narrower sense. The michō doi served as the base for the pillars supporting the curtains. Eight pillars are thought to have risen from the middle tier, with curtains hung around them and an octagonal canopy placed above.

The section on the Bureau of the Imperial Storehouse in the Engishiki prescribes furnishings for the Takamikura, including 9 phoenix figures, 25 mirrors, 8 jeweled banners, 12 screens, 2 curtains, and upper and lower floor coverings. The section on the Bureau of Artisans further specifies that the canopy of the Takamikura in the Daigokuden was to be octagonal, with a small phoenix figure at each corner and a jeweled banner suspended beneath it. Each of the 8 sides was to carry 3 mirrors, with a large mirror and a large phoenix figure at the top, giving totals of 9 phoenix figures and 25 mirrors.

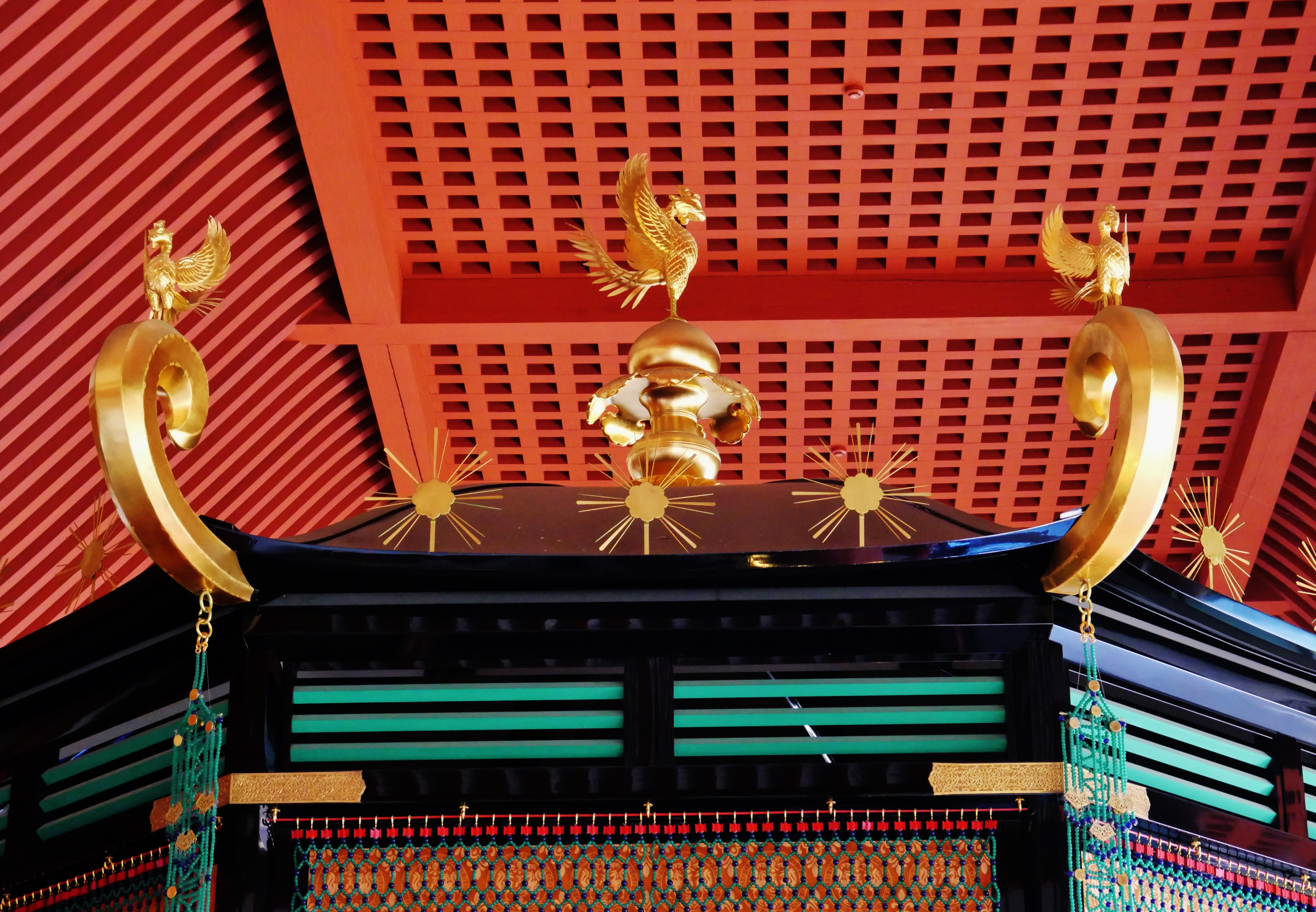
Upper portion of the reconstructed Takamikura in the First Daigokuden at the Heijō Palace site

Several structural differences have been proposed between the present Takamikura and its ancient form. Whereas the 8 pillars of the present structure rise from the upper tier, in antiquity they probably stood on the middle tier, the michō doi. The present canopy and the middle and upper tiers are elongated octagons extending east–west, whereas the ancient structure may have been a regular octagon, as suggested in part by the prescription that 3 mirrors be placed on each of its 8 sides.

The arrangement of the curtains is also thought to have differed from that of the present structure. Today, 8 curtains are hung between the pillars, whereas the Engishiki prescribes 12 screens and 2 curtains. The 12 screens have been reconstructed as a pair on each of the 6 sides other than the front and rear. For the 2 curtains, one reconstruction proposes that each curtain enclosed half of the Takamikura, while another places one curtain at the front and the other at the rear.

==== Permanence of installation ====
A point of debate is whether only the lowest platform (dan) was permanently installed, or whether the upper structure, including the pillars, canopy and curtains, also remained in place rather than being assembled for each ceremony.

One interpretation, based on provisions in the Engishiki and other sources, holds that while the lowest platform could be permanently installed in more than one ceremonial hall, there was only one Takamikura proper. On this view, the frame of the middle-tier base, the pillars and related components were normally stored by the Bureau of the Imperial Storehouse and assembled before a ceremony. The Engishiki also provides that the "ornaments of the Takamikura" used on New Year's Day were to be stored by the Bureau of the Imperial Storehouse and brought out when required.

On the other hand, the entry for the 22nd day of the fifth month of 899 in the Nihon Kiryaku records that the "Takamikura of the Daigokuden" was tilted by a violent wind. This has been cited as evidence that, by the late ninth century, components such as the pillars and canopy may have been left permanently in place rather than dismantled after ceremonies.

Another interpretation holds that even if the upper structure was erected only for ceremonies, the permanent presence of a stepped platform at the center of the Daigokuden continuously reserved the place occupied by the emperor, and that in this sense the Takamikura possessed a substantial degree of permanence even when its upper structure was temporary.

=== Forms of the imperial seat and modes of seating ===
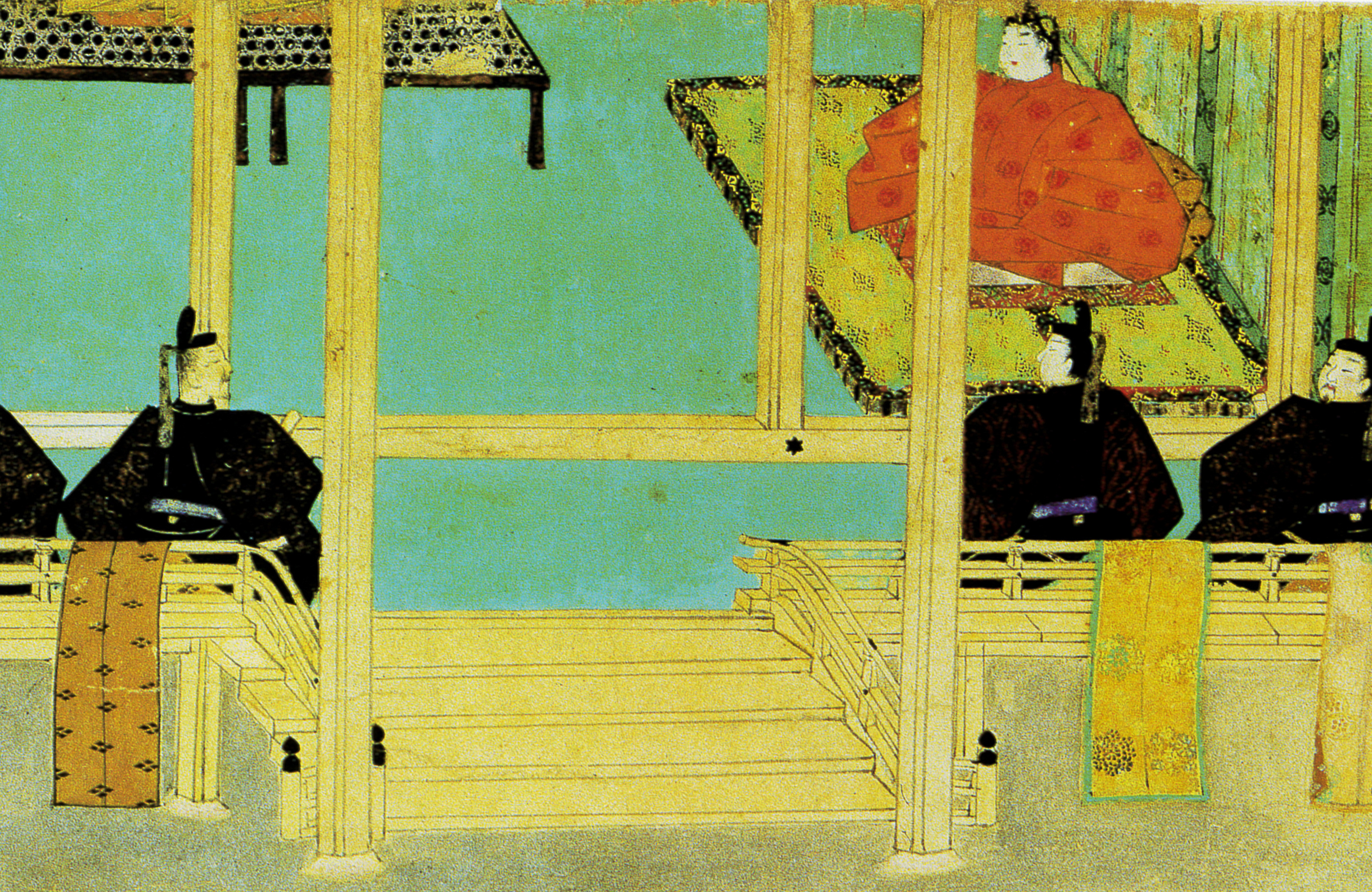
The Komakurabe Gyōkō Emaki (Kubosō copy). Emperor Go-Ichijō seated on a daishōji (upper left), and the crown prince (later Emperor Go-Suzaku) seated at floor level (upper right)

The imperial seat placed inside the Takamikura took different forms depending on the period and ceremony. In addition to a floor-level seat (hiraza) formed by layering tatami mats, cushions and other furnishings, seating furniture such as the daishōji and go-ishi was also used. The daishōji was a form of seating furniture distinct from a chair (ishi), and was also distinguished from hiraza, in which furnishings were laid directly on the floor.

In the Takamikura of the Daigokuden, the arrangement of the floor coverings differed between the earlier and later parts of the Heian period, but the imperial seat is thought generally to have taken the form of hiraza, with layers of tatami mats, cushions and other furnishings. In the Burakuden, by contrast, the form of the imperial seat varied according to the ceremony, and a daishōji was sometimes used. There were also instances in which a chair was placed inside the Takamikura for the Toyonoakari-no-sechie following the Daijō-sai. According to the Hyōhanki, at the Toyonoakari-no-sechie of 1166 the existing seat was removed and a go-ishi decorated in hyōmon was installed. A chair was also used at the Toyonoakari-no-sechie when the ceremony was revived in 1687.

Such distinctions in the form of the imperial seat were not confined to the interior of the Takamikura. In the Shishinden, Jijūden and Seiryōden of the inner palace (dairi), different forms—including chairs, daishōji and floor-level seating—were used according to the ceremony. The text accompanying the Komakurabe Gyōkō Emaki, which depicts Emperor Go-Ichijō's visit to Kaya-no-in on the 19th day of the ninth month of 1024, records that a daishōji was set up as the emperor's seat on the south side of the main residence (shinden), while the crown prince was given a floor-level seat. After the emperor moved to the eastern residential wing (tai), he again sat on a daishōji, while the crown prince sat at floor level in a slightly lower position in the seating arrangement.

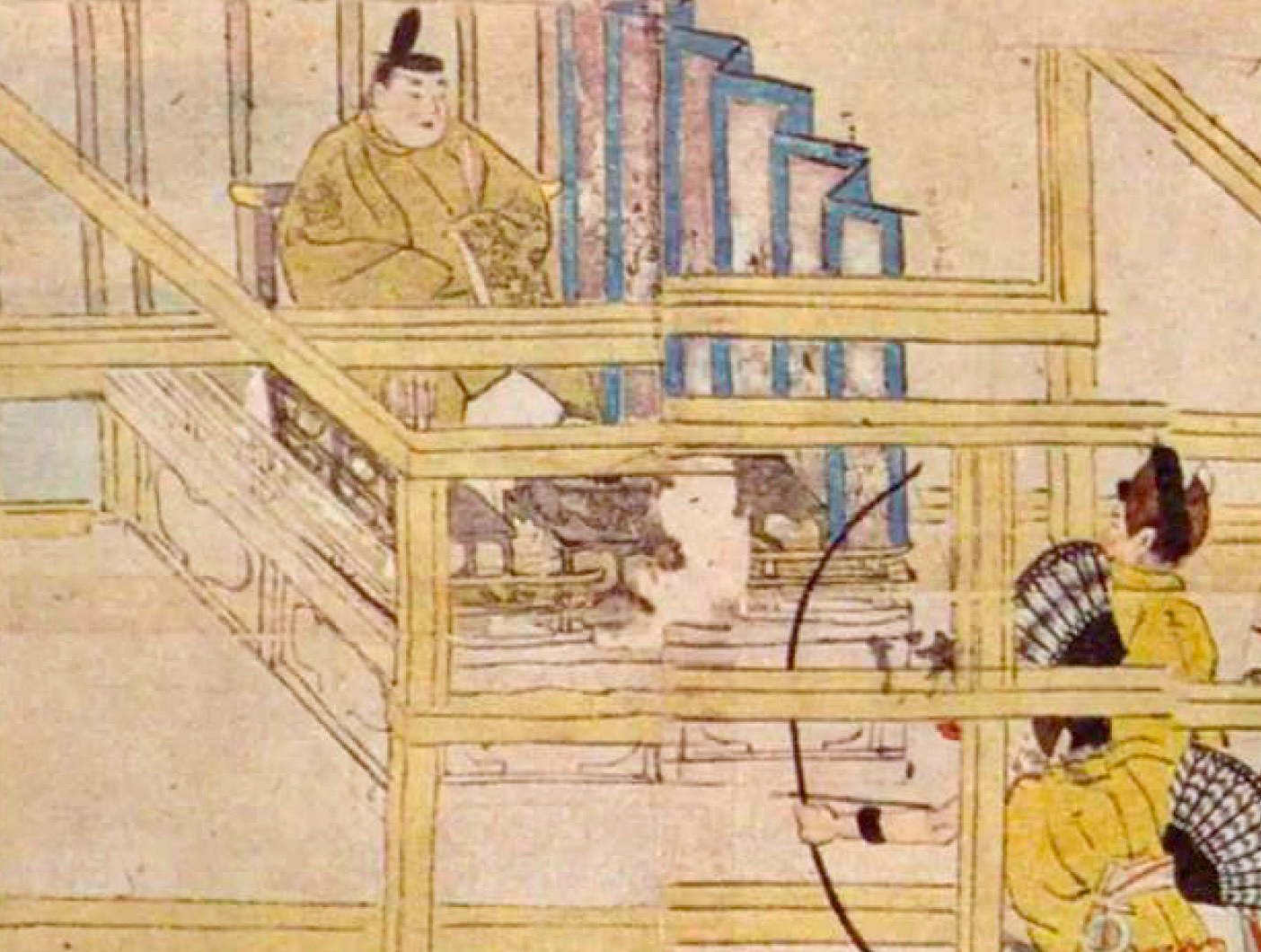
Detail of the noriyumi (court archery contest) scene in the Sumiyoshi copy of the Nenjū Gyōji Emaki, showing the emperor seated in a go-ishi

The Sumiyoshi copy of the Nenjū Gyōji Emaki, which preserves the pictorial designs of an original produced in the late Heian period, depicts the emperor seated in a go-ishi during noriyumi, a court archery contest held in the Ibadono. During Emperor Go-Hanazono's visit to the Muromachi residence of the shogun Ashikaga Yoshinori in 1437, three forms of imperial seat—a chair, a daishōji, and floor-level seating—were set up at the same time.

Floor-level seating continued to be used inside the Takamikura at enthronement ceremonies through the early modern period. At the enthronement of Emperor Meiji in 1868, however, a go-ishi was used in place of the traditional floor-level arrangement. This form was retained for the enthronements of Emperor Taishō and his successors, and a go-ishi is also installed inside the present Takamikura.

The reconstruction of the Takamikura in the First Daigokuden at Heijō Palace uses a chair-style imperial seat. The chair, however, was not reconstructed directly from documentary evidence; it was made under a reconstruction policy that dispensed with tatami in favor of a chair-style seat.

== Gallery ==
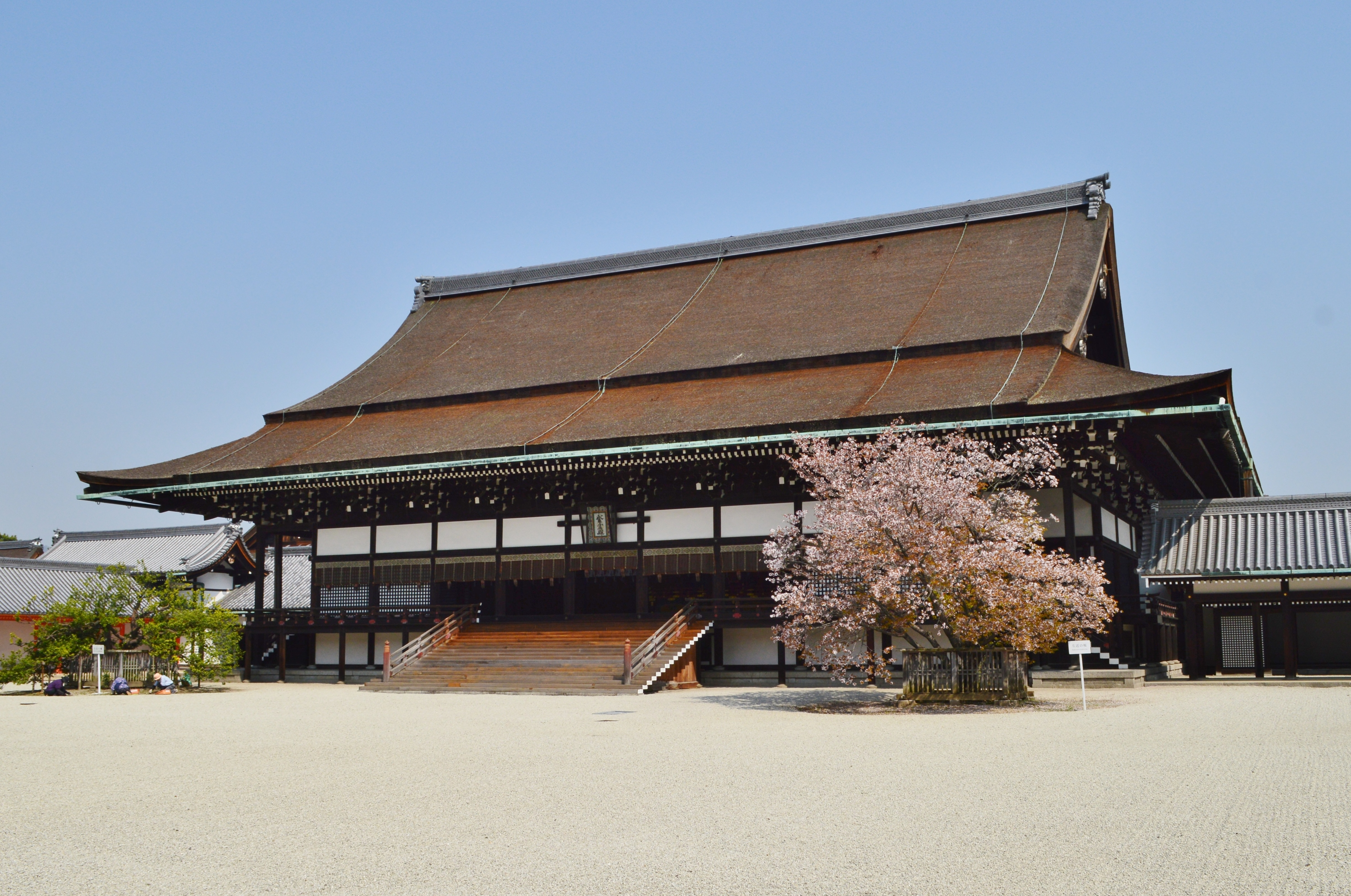
The Shishinden of the Kyoto Imperial Palace, used as the venue for imperial enthronement ceremonies from the later medieval period onward

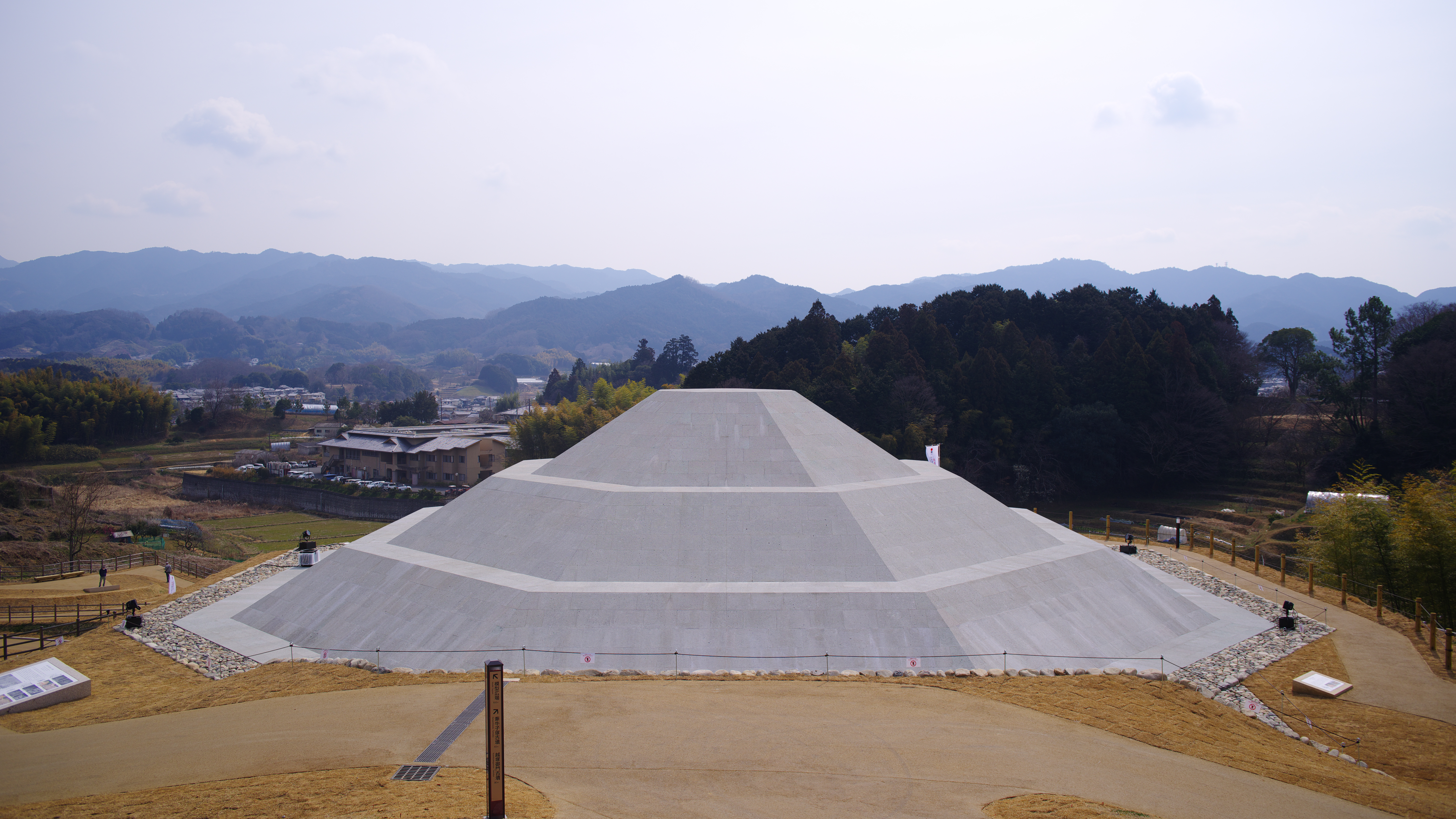
Kengoshizuka Kofun in Asuka, Nara Prefecture, an octagonal burial mound proposed as the joint tomb of Empress Saimei and Princess Hashihito

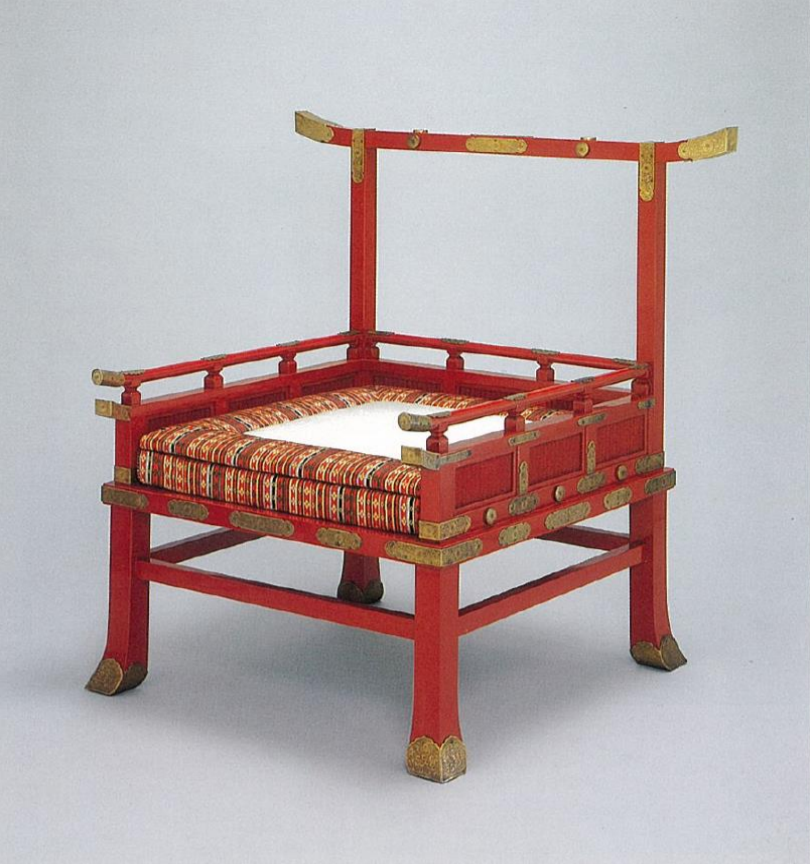
An example of a go-ishi, used at the Daikyo-no-Gi (Grand Banquet) in 2019. Since the Meiji period, a go-ishi has also been used as the imperial seat inside the Takamikura at enthronement ceremonies.

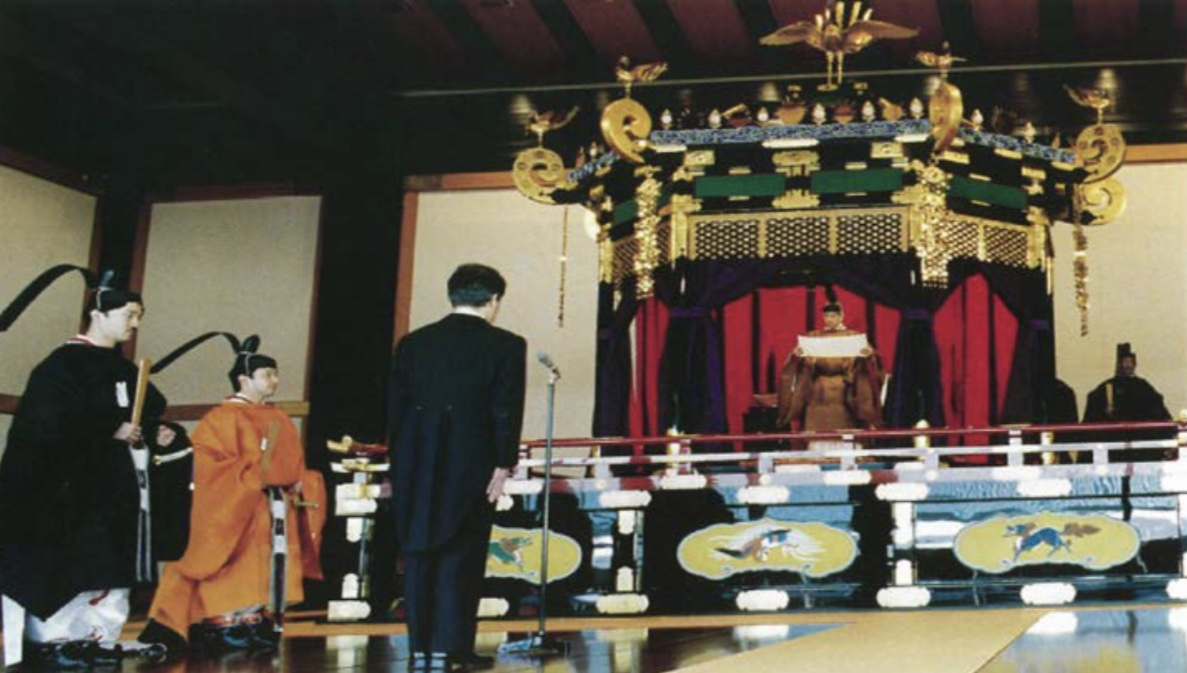
Emperor Akihito standing on the Takamikura during the Sokuirei-Seiden-no-gi on 12 November 1990

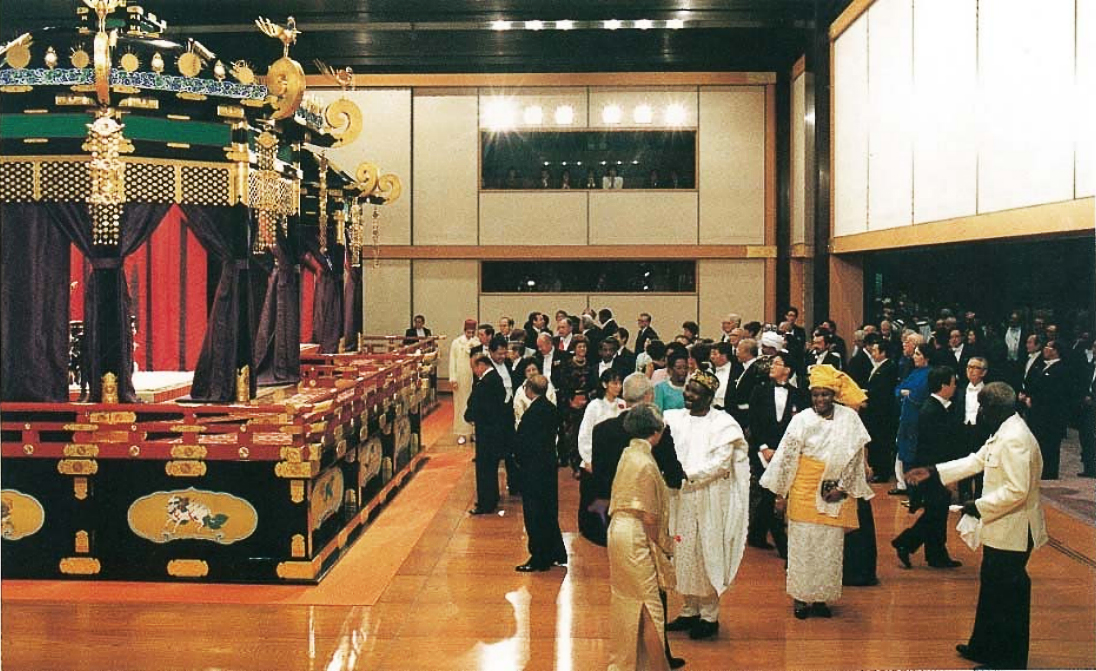
The emperor, members of the Imperial Family and foreign leaders conversing in front of the Takamikura after the Kyoen-no-Gi (Court Banquet) on 12 November 1990

== Bibliography ==
- Wada, Hidematsu (1926). 国史国文之研究 [Studies in Japanese History and Literature] (in Japanese). Yūzankaku.
- Kuroita, Katsumi, ed. (1931). 国史大系 [Compendium of Japanese History] (in Japanese). Vol. 11 (Reprint ed.). Kokushi Taikei Kankōkai.
- Kuroita, Katsumi, ed. (1935). 新訂増補 国史大系 [Newly Revised and Enlarged Compendium of Japanese History] (in Japanese). Vol. 2. Kokushi Taikei Kankōkai.
- Sasakawa, Tanerō, ed. (1936). 史料大成 [Compendium of Historical Sources] (in Japanese). Vol. 17（兵範記 第3）. Revised by Tarō Yano. Naigai Shoseki. doi:10.11501/3431545.
- Kuroita, Katsumi, ed. (1937). 国史大系 [Compendium of Japanese History] (in Japanese). Vol. 26. Kokushi Taikei Kankōkai.
- Fukuyama, Toshio, ed. (1978). 年中行事絵巻 [Illustrated Scroll of Annual Events]. 新修日本絵巻物全集 (in Japanese). Vol. 24. Kadokawa Shoten.
- Shirahata, Yoshi, ed. (1980). 寝覚物語絵巻・駒競行幸絵巻・小野雪見御幸絵巻・伊勢物語絵巻・なよ竹物語絵巻・葉月物語絵巻・豊明絵草子 [Picture Scrolls of The Tale of Nezame, the Imperial Excursion to the Horse Race, the Imperial Snow-Viewing Excursion to Ono, The Tales of Ise, The Tale of Nayotake, and The Tale of Hazuki; and the Toyonoakari Illustrated Book]. 新修日本絵巻物全集 (in Japanese). Vol. 17. Kadokawa Shoten.
- Wada, Atsumu (1984). タカミクラ―朝賀・即位式をめぐって― [Takamikura: New Year's Court Audiences and Enthronement Ceremonies]. In Committee Commemorating the Retirement of Professor Toshio Kishi (ed.). 日本政治社会史研究 [Studies in Japanese Political and Social History] (in Japanese). Vol. 1. Hanawa Shobō. pp. 235–267.
- Mainichi Shimbun Imperial Treasures Committee Office, ed. (1992). 皇室の至宝 6 御物 障屏・調度 1 [Treasures of the Imperial Household, vol. 6: Imperial Collections—Screens and Furnishings 1] (in Japanese). Mainichi Shimbun-sha. ISBN 978-4-620-80266-4.
- Tachibana, Kenji; Katō, Shizuko (1996). 大鏡 [The Great Mirror]. 新編日本古典文学全集 (in Japanese). Vol. 34. Shōgakukan. ISBN 4096580341.
- Furuoya, Tomohiro; Hakozaki, Kazuhisa (1997). 高御座の考証と復原 [Historical Investigation and Restoration of the Imperial Throne]. 奈良国立文化財研究所年報 (in Japanese) (1997-I). Nara National Research Institute for Cultural Properties: 22–23.
- Yoshie, Takashi (2003). 律令天皇制儀礼の基礎的構造―高御座に関する考察から― [The Fundamental Structure of Ritual under the Ritsuryō Imperial System: A Study of the Takamikura]. 史学雑誌 史学雑誌 (in Japanese). 112 (3). The Historical Society of Japan: 319–339. doi:10.24471/shigaku.112.3_319.
- Mitsuda, Saori (2008). 仁寿殿・紫宸殿・清涼殿の空間構成と儀式―平安宮内裏の空間構成と儀式に関する歴史的研究1― [Space and Ceremonies in Jijuden, Shishinden and Seiryoden: A Historical Study on the Space and the Ceremonies in Heian-kyu Palace 1]. Journal of Architecture and Planning (Transactions of Aij) 日本建築学会計画系論文集 [Journal of Architecture and Planning (Transactions of AIJ)] (in Japanese). 73 (634): 2763–2771. doi:10.3130/aija.73.2763.
- Kawamoto, Shigeo (2009). 天皇の座―高御座・倚子・大床子・平敷― [History of the Japanese Emperor's Seats]. 家具道具室内史 : 家具道具室内史学会誌 (in Japanese) (1). The Japan Society for the History of Interiors, Furniture and Tools: 52–66. ISSN 1883-8251.
- Imao, Fumiaki (2011). 牽牛子塚古墳の発掘成果を考える [Considering the Excavation Results of the Kengoshizuka Kofun] (PDF). 中学校 社会科のしおり (in Japanese) (April 2011, first-term supplement). Teikoku-Shoin. Archived from the original (PDF) on 10 March 2013.
- Ishida, Sanehiro (2013). 所謂『文安御即位調度図』の祖本をめぐって [The Origin of the So-called "Bun'an Gosokuin Chodozu" (The Illustrated Implements of Accession in the Bun'an Period)]. 書陵部紀要 [Bulletin: Study on the Japanese Culture in Relation to the Imperial Family and Court] (in Japanese) (64). Archives and Mausolea Department, Imperial Household Agency: 1–18.
- Nishimura, Shintarō (2016). 災害による朝廷儀式記録の消失と高御座の再生――天明の大火後の即位礼を事例に―― [Loss of Court Ceremonial Records Due to Disaster and the Reconstruction of the Takamikura: The Enthronement Ceremony after the Great Fire of Tenmei as a Case Study]. 国文学研究資料館紀要 国文学研究資料館紀要 アーカイブズ研究篇 (in Japanese) (12). National Institute of Japanese Literature: 1–33. doi:10.24619/00001850.
- Higasa, Hayato (2016). 嘉承二年の『御即位次第』について [On the Order of the Enthronement Ceremony of 1107] (PDF). 歴史文化社会論講座紀要 (in Japanese) (13). Department of History, Culture and Society, Graduate School of Human and Environmental Studies, Kyoto University: 19–39.
- Kyoto National Museum, ed. (2020). 御即位記念 特別展 皇室の名宝 [Special Exhibition Commemorating the Enthronement: Treasures of the Imperial Household] (in Japanese). Yomiuri Shimbun.
- Mitsuda, Saori (2020). 紫宸殿御帳台の継壇に関する復元的研究―即位関連儀式の玉座にみる平安復古の理想とその実現― [A Reconstructive Study of the Platform Structure of the Michōdai in the Shishinden: The Ideal of a Heian Revival and Its Realization as Seen in Imperial Seats Used in Enthronement-related Ceremonies]. 宮内庁京都事務所年報 (in Japanese). 1. Kyoto Office of the Imperial Household Agency: 82–99.
