= Ishii =

Ishii (石井, "stone well") is a Japanese surname. Notable people with the surname include:

- Adena Ishii, American politician
- Akio Ishii (born 1955), Japanese baseball player
- Ami Ishii (born 2002), Japanese freestyle wrestler
- Anna Ishii (born 1998), Japanese performer, model and actress
- Anthony W. Ishii (born 1946), American judge
- Baku Ishii (1886–1962), Japanese dancer
- Chie Ishii (石井 千恵; born 1983), Japanese professional wrestler
- David Ishii (born 1955), Japanese-American golfer
- Erika Ishii, American voice actor
- Gakuryū Ishii, (b. 1957) Japanese film director aka Sogo Ishii
- Hiroshi Ishii (computer scientist), professor at the Massachusetts Institute of Technology
- Hiroshi Ishii (golfer) (1941–2006), Japanese golfer
- Hisaichi Ishii (石井 壽一; born 1951), Japanese manga artist
- Hitoshi Ishii (born 1947), Japanese mathematician
- Kaisei Ishii (石井 快征; born 2000), Japanese footballer
- Kan Ishii (1921–2009), Japanese composer, and the brother of composer Maki Ishii
- Katsuhito Ishii (born 1966), Japanese film director
- Kazuhisa Ishii (born 1973), Japanese baseball player
- Kazuyoshi Ishii (born 1953), Japanese karateka
- Keisuke Ishii (石井 慧介; born 1985), Japanese professional wrestler
- Ken Ishii, Japanese DJ and music producer
- Kentarō Ishii, Japanese shogi player
- Kikujiro Ishii (1866–1945), Japanese diplomat who negotiated the Lansing-Ishii Agreement
- Kikuyo Ishii (石井 菊代; born 1954), Japanese swimmer
- Koichi Ishii, Japanese video game director
- Koki Ishii (born 1995), Japanese footballer
- Kouji Ishii (born 1960), Japanese voice actor (real name Kōzō Ishii)
- Kunio Ishii (born 1941), professional Go player
- Maki Ishii (1936–2003), Japanese composer, and the brother of composer Kan Ishii
- Mario Alberto Ishii (born 1951), Argentine politician
- Masanori Ishii (石井 正則; born 1973), Japanese actor, comedian and narrator
- Satoshi Ishii (born 1986), Japanese judoka and mixed martial arts fighter
- Sayaka Ishii (born 2005), Japanese tennis player
- Shigemi Ishii (born 1951), Japanese footballer
- Shirō Ishii (1892–1959), military physician who created and ran Japan's biological warfare program
- Shohachi Ishii (石井 庄八; 1926–1980), Japanese sport wrestler
- Sogo Ishii (born 1957), Japanese film director
- Susumu Ishii (1924–1991), second kaicho (Godfather) of the Inagawa-kai yakuza gang in Japan
- Takashi Ishii (film director) (1946–2022), Japanese film director and screenwriter
- Takashi Ishii (baseball) (born 1971), Japanese baseball pitcher and coach
- Takeo Ishii (born May 3, 1947), Japanese yodeler
- Takuro Ishii (born 1970), Japanese baseball player
- Tatsuya Ishii (born 1959), Japanese singer, songwriter, artist, and industrial designer
- Teruo Ishii (1924–2005), Japanese film director
- Tomiko Ishii (born 1935), Japanese actress
- Tomohiro Ishii (石井 智宏; born 1975), Japanese professional wrestler
- Tomoo Ishii (石井 朝夫; 1923–2022), Japanese golfer
- Tomoya Ishii (石井 智也; born 1989), Japanese alpine skier
- Vania Ishii (born 1973), Japanese-Brazilian judoka
- Yasushi Ishii (born 1970), Japanese singer and composer
- Yoneo Ishii (石井 米雄; 1929–2010), Japanese historian
- Yuka Ishii (石井 遊佳; born 1963), Japanese writer
- Yuki Ishii (born 1991), volleyball player
- Yutaka Ishii (1920–?), Japanese baseball player

== Fictional characters ==
- O-Ren Ishii, a fictional character and the main antagonist from the Quentin Tarantino film, Kill Bill: Volume 1
