= Akio Ishikawa =

Japanese shogi player (born 1963)

- Native name: 石川陽生
- Born: March 5, 1963 (age 63)
- Hometown: Shinjuku

Career
- Achieved professional status: May 14, 1986 (aged 23)
- Badge number: 177
- Rank: 7-dan
- Retired: September 14, 2023 (aged 60)
- Teacher: Takeshi Takada (7-dan)
- Career record: 552–559 (.497)
- Notable students: Jōdai Furui

Websites
- JSA profile page

Akio Ishikawa (石川 陽生, Ishikawa Akio; March 5, 1963) is a Japanese retired professional shogi player who achieved the rank of 7-dan.

== Early life and apprenticeship ==
Ishikawa was born in Shinjuku, Tokyo on March 5, 1963. He entered the Japan Shogi Association's apprentice school at the rank 6-kyū under the guidance of shogi professional Takeshi Takada in 1977. He was promoted to apprentice professional 1-dan in 1980, and obtained full professional status and the rank of 4-dan in 1986.

== Shogi professional ==
Ishikawa finished the 73rd Meijin Class C2 league (April 2014 – March 2015) with a record of 3 wins and 7 losses, earning a third demotion point which meant automatic demotion to "Free Class" play.

On April 3, 2023, the JSA announced on its official website that Ishikawa had met the Free Class criteria for mandatory retirement and that his retirement would become official upon completion of his last scheduled official game for the 2023–2024 season. His retirement became official on September 14, 2023, upon completion of his game against Naoya Fujiwara. Ishikawa finished with a career record of 552 wins and 559 loses for a winning percentage of 0.497.

=== Promotion history ===
The promotion history for Ishikawa is as follows:

- 6-kyū: 1977
- 1-dan: 1980
- 4-dan: May 14, 1986
- 5-dan: July 16, 1991
- 6-dan: July 30, 1998
- 7-dan: October 23, 2007
- Retired: September 14, 2023

=== Awards and honors ===
Ishikawa received the JSA's "25 Years Service Award" in 2011 in recognition of being an active professional for twenty-five years.
