= Ishi (chair) =

Type of chair used at the Japanese imperial court

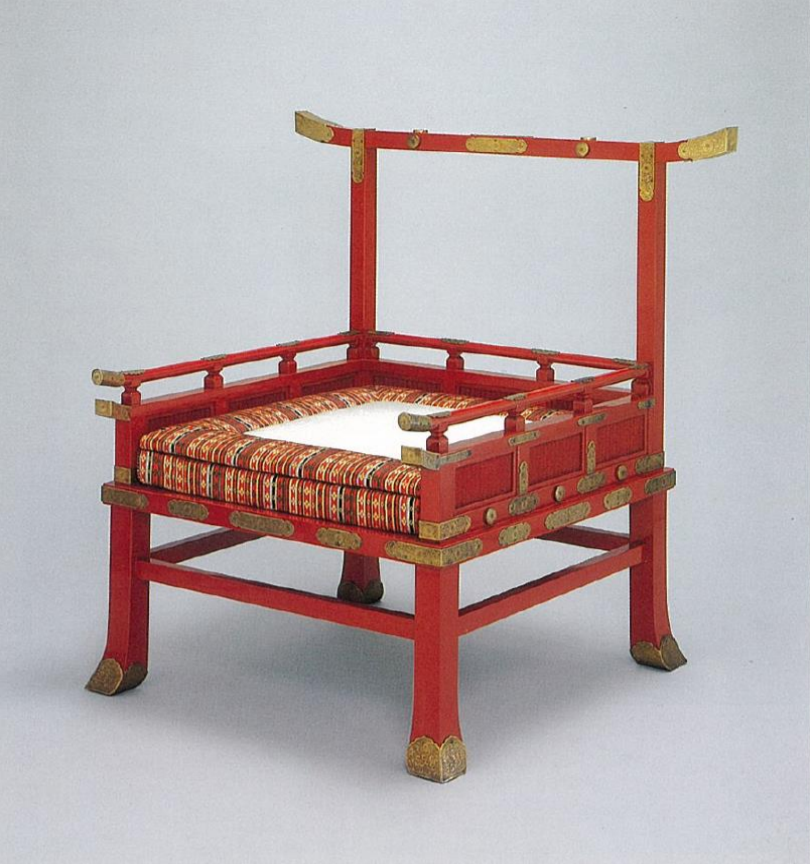
An imperial chair used at the Daikyō-no-gi court banquet in 2019

An ishi (倚子) is a type of chair. Ishi have been used at the Japanese imperial court, and an ishi used by the emperor is called a goishi (御倚子). An ishi on which the emperor sat was also known as an ishi no omashi (倚子の御座).

When seated on an ishi, the sitter lowered the legs from the seat. This mode of sitting differed from that used on chair-shaped seats on which the sitter placed the legs on top of the seat. During the Heian period, ishi were used as seats for the emperor in palace halls such as the Jijūden, Shishinden, and Seiryōden. Depending on the ceremony and setting, they were used alongside other forms of imperial seating, such as hiraza (平座), a floor-level form of imperial seating. Ishi have continued to be used in imperial court ceremonies in the modern era, including enthronement ceremonies.

== Terminology ==
Historically, the characters 倚子 were read ishi. The Iroha Jiruishō also gives 倚子 with the reading イシ (ishi). After the introduction of Zen Buddhism to Japan, the reading isu, based on Tōsō-on (唐宋音) pronunciations, came into use, and the spelling 椅子 also became more common.

The term goishi (御倚子) denotes an ishi used by the emperor. The Kyoto Office of the Imperial Household Agency also uses the term goishi for chairs preserved at the Kyoto Imperial Palace for the emperor's use. An ishi serving as the emperor's seat was also known as an ishi no omashi (倚子の御座); examples of this expression are found in sources such as the Tentoku Utaawase. For chairs used in modern and contemporary imperial court ceremonies, the term is also sometimes written with the characters 御椅子.

== Form and sitting posture ==
In form, an ishi has a square seat supported by legs, railings on both sides, and a torii-shaped backrest. During the Heian period, some ishi had railings above the armrests, a tatami mat laid on the seat, and decoration such as vermilion lacquer and mother-of-pearl inlay.

Some of the goishi preserved at the Kyoto Imperial Palace have a four-legged seat, a torii-shaped backrest, and side railings, with a small tatami mat and a cushion layered on the seat.

On an ishi, the sitter sat with the legs hanging down from the seat, a posture described as 垂足而座. This differed from the posture used on chair-shaped seats on which the sitter sat with the legs drawn up onto the seat.

== Relationship to the red-lacquered keyaki koshō ==
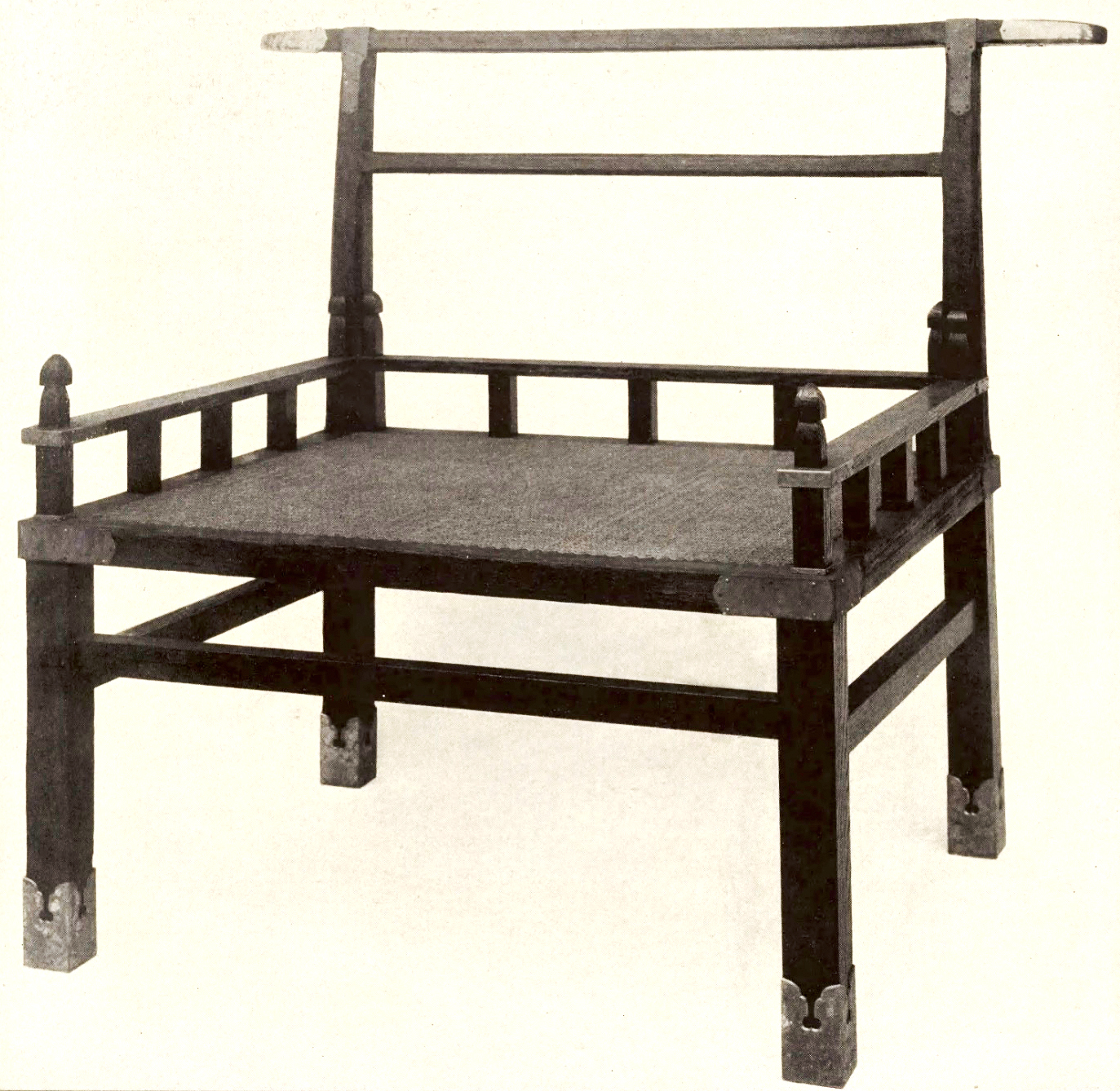
The red-lacquered keyaki koshō preserved in the South Repository of the Shōsōin

The red-lacquered keyaki koshō (赤漆欟木胡床), preserved in the South Repository of the Shōsōin, is a large four-legged ishi with railings and a torii-shaped backrest. It is regarded as corresponding to the type of ishi used in the medieval period. (Note: Under the entry for 倚子 in the Iroha Jiruishō, it reads イシ 胡床之類也 ("Ishi: a type of koshō").)

Its sitting posture, however, differed from that of later ishi. The red-lacquered keyaki koshō is made of keyaki (Zelkova serrata) wood. The wood was stained with red pigment and coated with transparent lacquer, allowing the grain to remain visible. Rather than sitting with the legs hanging down as on a modern chair, the sitter is thought to have sat cross-legged on its broad seat.

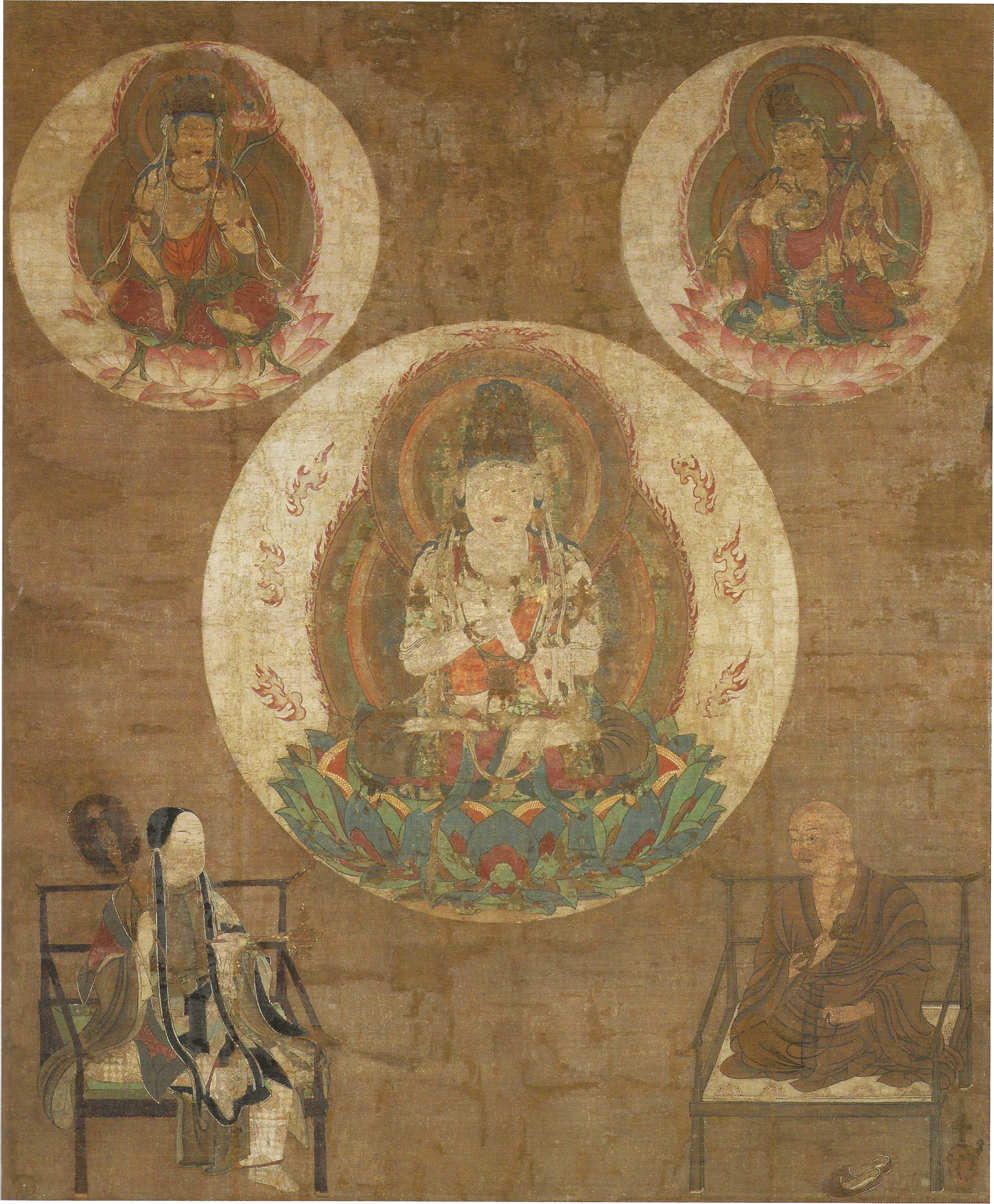
The Gosonzō. Kūkai sits cross-legged on a chair-shaped seat at lower right, while Prince Shōtoku sits in a half-lotus posture on a similar seat at lower left. Kamakura period, 13th century; Hōryū-ji.

In the Kamakura-period Gosonzō (五尊像, "Five Venerable Figures"), Kūkai is depicted sitting cross-legged on a chair-shaped seat in the lower part of the composition, while Prince Shōtoku sits in a half-lotus posture on a similar seat. These images have been discussed as iconographic evidence for examining sitting postures associated with koshō.

== Use at the imperial court ==
At the imperial court, the use of ishi was restricted to persons of high rank and senior officials. In studies of ceremonial spaces within the inner palace of the Heian Palace, however, the emperor and the crown prince were the persons who used ishi in the ceremonies examined.

The Kamonryō (Bureau of Housekeeping) section of the Engishiki states 紫宸殿設黒柿木倚子 ("In the Shishinden, a black-persimmon-wood ishi shall be set up"), prescribing the placement of such an ishi in the Shishinden. In the early Heian period, a form of imperial seat (御床) was used as the emperor's seat in the Shishinden; from around the end of the ninth century, a goishi is thought to have been placed on the chōdai (帳台, curtained platform). Records from the middle and late Heian period show a goishi placed as the emperor's seat inside the curtained enclosure of the Shishinden, standing on a floor covering (土敷) on the chōdai. In some cases, a cushion of Chinese brocade was placed beneath the goishi. At sechie (節会, formal court assemblies and banquets), highly ornamented ishi decorated in the hyōmon (平文) technique were used.

At the naien (private court banquets) held in the Jijūden, a mother-of-pearl-inlaid ishi belonging to the Kurōdo-dokoro (Chamberlains' Office) was set up in the southern hisashi (廂) as the emperor's seat. Whereas the ishi in the Shishinden was placed inside the curtained enclosure, the one in the Jijūden was set up directly in the southern hisashi. Ceremonies held in the Jijūden included arrangements in which an ishi served as the emperor's seat.

In the Seiryōden, chair seating using a goishi and floor-level seating using round cushions or half-size tatami mats were employed according to the ceremony.

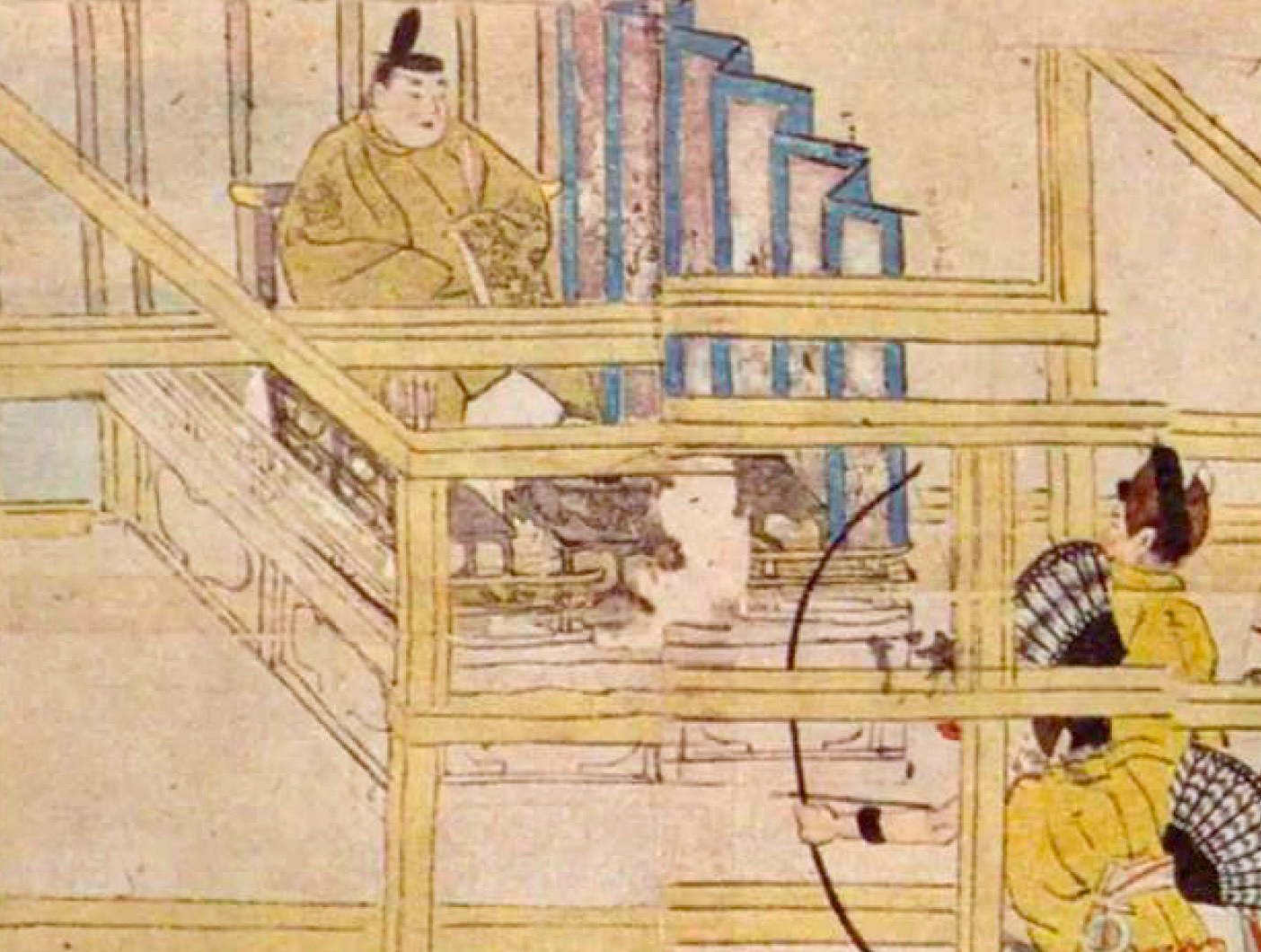
Detail of the archery-contest scene in the Sumiyoshi version of the Nenjū Gyōji Emaki, showing the emperor seated on a goishi

The Sumiyoshi version of the Nenjū Gyōji Emaki, which preserves the compositions of an original produced in the late Heian period, depicts the emperor seated on a goishi in the archery pavilion during an archery contest.

During Emperor Go-Hanazono's visit to the Muromachi residence of the shogun Ashikaga Yoshinori in 1437, three different forms of imperial seating were set up simultaneously in the shinden (main hall). From north to south, these consisted of a vermilion-lacquered hyōmon goishi placed on a brocade floor mat; a hyōmon-decorated daishōji (大床子) on a two-colored floor mat, topped with a thick round cushion; and a hirashiki (平敷) seat formed from tatami with multicolored brocade borders and a cushion. Ishi, daishōji, and hirashiki were each used as distinct forms of imperial seating.

== Takamikura and ishi ==
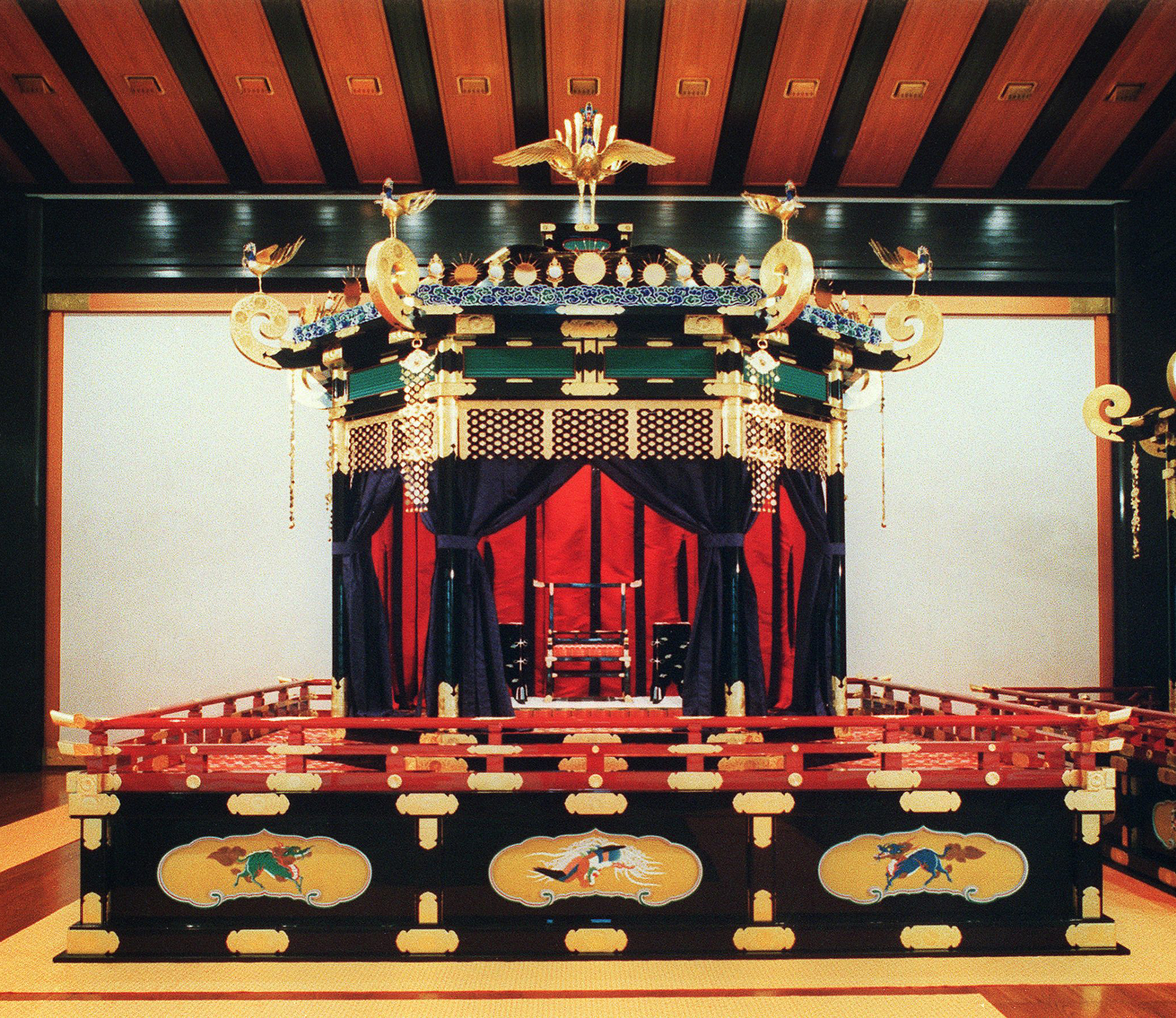
The Takamikura. The emperor's seat is placed within the structure.

The Takamikura is not itself an ishi, but a ceremonial structure in which the emperor's seat is installed. The form of seating placed inside it was not fixed and varied according to the ceremony.

In the Takamikura of the Daigokuden, floor-level seating formed by layering tatami mats, cushions, and other furnishings is thought to have remained the basic form throughout the Heian period.

There were instances in which chair seating using an ishi was employed at the Toyoakari no sechie, a court banquet held after the Daijō-sai. According to the Heihanki, at the Toyoakari no sechie of 1166, the previous imperial seat was removed and a hyōmon goishi was set up in its place.

Chair seating using an ishi was also employed when the Toyoakari no sechie was revived in 1687.

The Daijō-e (大嘗会) of Emperor Ninkō in 1818 was a four-day observance beginning with the Daijō-sai and followed by three days of court banquets. A hyōmon goishi was placed inside each chōdai of the two ceremonial curtained enclosures known as the Yuki and Suki michō (悠紀・主基両国御帳). These were used for the sechie held on the Dragon and Snake days, the second and third days of the observance. On the final day, for the Toyoakari no sechie, the supporting platforms and chōdai for the two enclosures were removed. The furnishings inside the Takamikura were then rearranged, and a hyōmon goishi was installed there.

Until the early modern period, a hirashiki was used inside the Takamikura during enthronement ceremonies. At the enthronement of Emperor Meiji in 1868, the Takamikura had been destroyed in the 1854 fire, so the chōdai permanently installed in the Shishinden was used in place of the Takamikura. The imperial seat inside it was changed from the traditional hirashiki arrangement to one using a goishi.

== Modern and contemporary period ==
Since the enthronement of Emperor Taishō in 1915, the form in which a goishi is placed inside the Takamikura has been used for enthronement ceremonies. The present Takamikura was newly constructed for that occasion and has also been used in subsequent enthronement ceremonies.

At the Daikyō-no-gi (大饗の儀), a grand banquet held after the central rites of the Daijō-sai, at the Imperial Palace on 16 and 18 November 2019, imperial chairs (御椅子) were used as the seats of the emperor and empress.

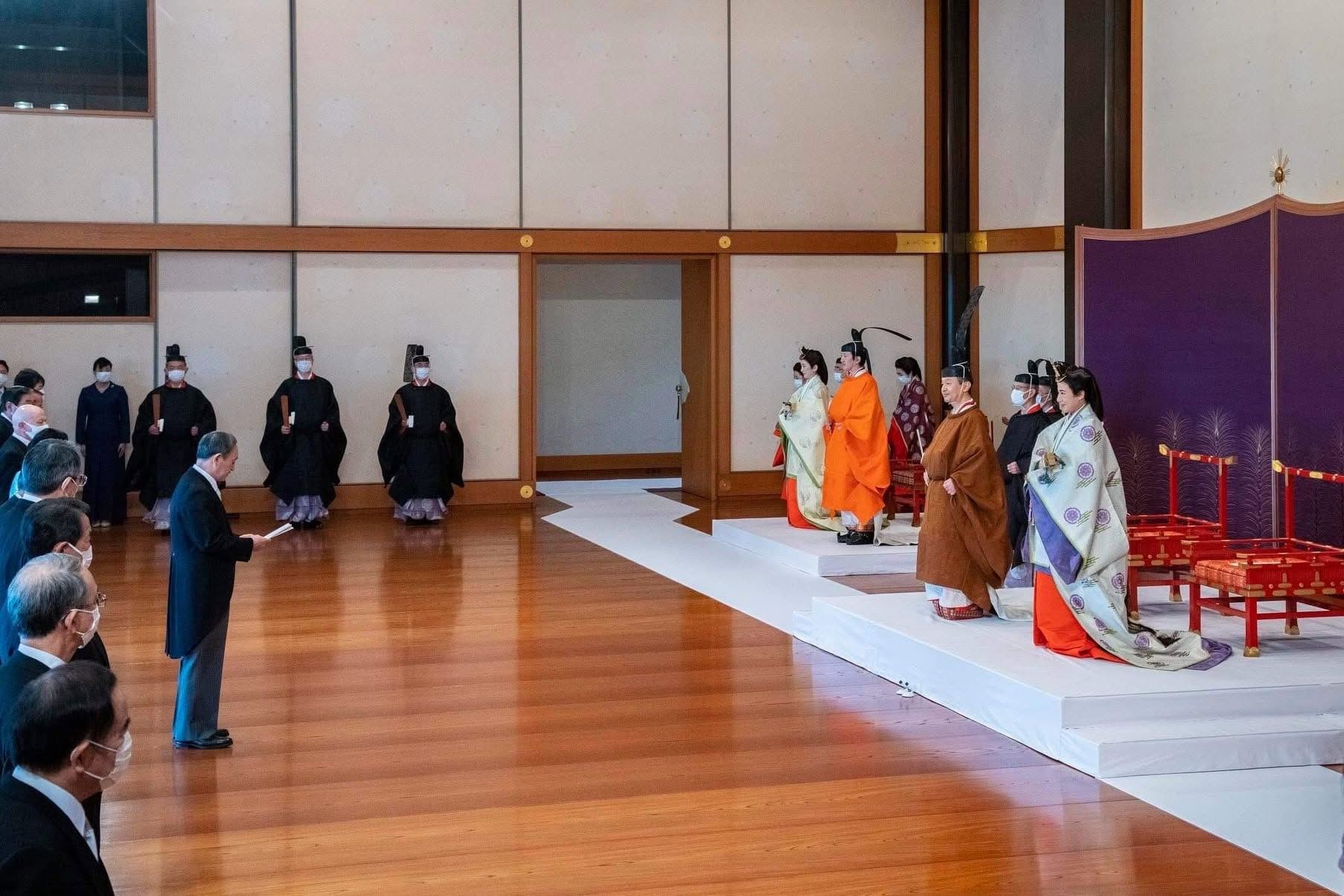
The Rikkōshi Senmei-no-gi in 2020, with the imperial chairs for the emperor and empress and for Crown Prince and Crown Princess Akishino

At the Rikkōshi Senmei-no-gi (立皇嗣宣明の儀, Ceremony for Proclamation of Crown Prince), held in the Matsu-no-Ma (State Room) of the Imperial Palace on 8 November 2020, imperial chairs were likewise used for the emperor and empress and for Crown Prince and Crown Princess Akishino.

== Extant examples ==
A goishi made during the Ansei era (1854–1860) is preserved in the Daiban-dokoro (台盤所) of the Seiryōden at the Kyoto Imperial Palace. Made of black persimmon wood, it is decorated with scrolling designs in mother-of-pearl inlay and has a torii-shaped backrest and two-tiered armrests. A small tatami mat with ungen (繧繝) brocade edging and a cushion are layered on the seat. According to the Kyoto Office of the Imperial Household Agency, it measures 55 cm wide, 54 cm deep, and 91 cm high.

Another goishi preserved in the Tenjō-no-Ma (殿上の間) of the Seiryōden measures 77 cm wide, 83.5 cm deep, and 112.3 cm high, making it the largest goishi at the Kyoto Imperial Palace. It has a torii-shaped backrest and side railings, and is finished on a black-lacquer ground to represent the grain of rosewood. It is normally placed in the northeastern corner of the Tenjō-no-Ma. Historically, it served as a seat of honor indicating the room's association with the emperor. On occasions such as the Kochōhai (小朝拝), a court ceremony held on New Year's Day, it was brought out of the Tenjō-no-Ma for the emperor to sit on.

Inside the Takamikura in the Shishinden is a rectangular goishi with a torii-shaped backrest, finished in polished lacquer with a wood-grain pattern and decorated with mother-of-pearl inlay. An ungen-edged tatami mat and a cushion with a white-ground diamond pattern are layered on the seat.

The goishi in the Daiban-dokoro, Tenjō-no-Ma, and Takamikura at the Kyoto Imperial Palace are basically similar in form, but differ in their finishes and decoration. The Daiban-dokoro goishi has a black-persimmon-wood ground, whereas the Takamikura goishi has a red-lacquer ground with a wood-grain pattern painted in black lacquer.

== See also ==
- Chrysanthemum Throne
- Enthronement of the Japanese emperor

== Sources ==
- Masamune, Atsuo, ed. (1928). Iroha Jiruishō I–II 伊呂波字類抄 第一-二 [Iroha Classified Dictionary, Volumes 1–2]. Nihon Koten Zenshū (in Japanese). Nihon Koten Zenshū Kankōkai.
- Sasagawa, Tanerō, ed. (1936). Heihanki III 兵範記 第3 [Heihanki, Volume 3]. Shiryō Taisei (in Japanese). Vol. 17. Tarō Yano, reviser. Naigai Shoseki.
- Utaawase no Maki: Den Munetaka Shinnō Hitsubon 歌合巻 : 伝宗尊親王筆本 [Utaawase Scroll: Manuscript Traditionally Attributed to Imperial Prince Munetaka] (in Japanese). Vol. 1. Collated by Hitaku Kyūsojin. Koten Bunko. 1950.
- Nihon Rekishi Daijiten Editorial Committee, ed. (1968). "Ishi no omashi" 倚子の御座 [The Emperor's Ishi Seat]. Nihon Rekishi Daijiten (in Japanese). Vol. 1. Kawade Shobō.
- Fukuyama, Toshio, ed. (1978). Nenjū Gyōji Emaki 年中行事絵巻 [Illustrated Scrolls of Annual Events]. Shinshū Nihon Emakimono Zenshū (in Japanese). Vol. 24. Kadokawa Shoten.
- Office of the Shosoin Treasure House, ed. (1978). Shōsōin no Mokkō 正倉院の木工 [Woodwork of the Shōsōin] (in Japanese). Nihon Keizai Shimbunsha.
- Suzuki, Wataru (1990). Heian-kyū Dairi no Kenkyū 平安宮内裏の研究 [A Study of the Inner Palace of the Heian Palace] (in Japanese). Chūō Kōron Bijutsu Shuppan.
- Saitō, Tadashi (1992). Nihon Kōkogaku Yōgo Jiten 日本考古学用語辞典 [Dictionary of Japanese Archaeological Terms] (in Japanese). Gakuseisha.
- Yoshie, Takashi (2003). "Ritsuryō Tennōsei Girei no Kisoteki Kōzō: Takamikura ni Kansuru Kōsatsu kara" 律令天皇制儀礼の基礎的構造―高御座に関する考察から― [The Basic Structure of Rituals under the Ritsuryō Imperial System: A Study of the Takamikura]. Shigaku Zasshi 史学雑誌 (in Japanese). 112 (3): 319–339. doi:10.24471/shigaku.112.3_319.
- Mitsuda, Saori (2008). "Jijūden, Shishinden, Seiryōden no Kūkan Kōsei to Gishiki: Heian-kyū Dairi no Kūkan Kōsei to Gishiki ni Kansuru Rekishiteki Kenkyū 1" 仁寿殿・紫宸殿・清涼殿の空間構成と儀式―平安宮内裏の空間構成と儀式に関する歴史的研究1― [Space and Ceremonies in Jijuden, Shishinden and Seiryoden: A Historical Study on the Space and the Ceremonies in Heian-kyu Palace 1]. Journal of Architecture and Planning (Transactions of AIJ) 日本建築学会計画系論文集 (in Japanese). 73 (634): 2763–2771. doi:10.3130/aija.73.2763.
- Kawamoto, Shigeo (2009). "Tennō no Za: Takamikura, Ishi, Daishōji, Hirashiki" 天皇の座―高御座・倚子・大床子・平敷― [Seats of the Emperor: Takamikura, Ishi, Daishōji, and Hirashiki]. Kagu Dōgu Shitsunaishi 家具道具室内史 : 家具道具室内史学会誌 (in Japanese) (1). Japan Society for the History of Interiors, Furniture and Tools: 52–66. ISSN 1883-8251.
- Hattori, Tosaku (2012). "Koshō no Keitai to Sono Zahō ni Tsuite (1)" 胡牀の形態とその座法について（1） [On the Form of the Koshō and Its Sitting Posture (1)] (PDF). Geijutsugaku Kenkyū Kiyō 芸術学研究紀要 (in Japanese). 17: 46–53.
- Nara National Museum, ed. (2019). Dai 71-kai Shōsōin-ten Mokuroku 第71回「正倉院展」目録 [Catalogue of the 71st Annual Exhibition of Shōsō-in Treasures] (in Japanese). Nara National Museum.
- Mitsuda, Saori (2020). "Shishinden Michōdai no Tsugidan ni Kansuru Fukugenteki Kenkyū: Sokui Kanren Gishiki no Gyokuza ni Miru Heian Fukko no Risō to Sono Jitsugen" 紫宸殿御帳台の継壇に関する復元的研究―即位関連儀式の玉座にみる平安復古の理想とその実現― [A Reconstructive Study of the Tsugidan of the Shishinden Michōdai: The Ideal and Realization of Heian Revival as Seen in Thrones Used in Enthronement-Related Ceremonies]. Annual Report of the Kyoto Office of the Imperial Household Agency 宮内庁京都事務所年報 (in Japanese). 1. Kyoto Office of the Imperial Household Agency: 82–99.
