= Naoya Fujiwara =

Japanese shogi player (born 1965)

- Native name: 藤原直哉
- Born: May 27, 1965 (age 61)
- Hometown: Kobe

Career
- Achieved professional status: April 1, 1989 (aged 23)
- Badge number: 190
- Rank: 7-dan
- Retired: April 22, 2026 (aged 60)
- Teacher: Masakazu Wakamatsu (8-dan)
- Career record: 486–566 (.462)

Websites
- JSA profile page

Naoya Fujiwara (藤原 直哉, Fujiwara Naoya; born May 27, 1965) is a Japanese retired professional shogi player who achieved the rank of 7-dan.

== Early life and apprenticeship ==
Fujiwara was born in Kobe on May 27, 1965. He was accepted into the Japan Shogi Association's apprentice school at the rank of 6-kyū as a protegee of shogi professional Masakazu Wakamatsu in 1979, and obtained full professional status and the rank of 4-dan in 1989 after winning 4th 3-dan League with a record of 16 wins and 2 losses. Since he was the first apprentice professional to obtain regular professional status after the start of the Heisei era in January 1989, he was nicknamed "the first Heisei pro".

== Shogi professional ==
Fujiwara, Kōji Tanigawa and Keita Inoue were members of the "Kobe Group" led Kunio Naitō because all four were from the Kobe area and connected to Masakazu Wakamatsu. (Note: Tanigawa, Inoue and Fujiwara are fellow students of Wakamatsu, while Naitō and Wakamatsu are fellow students of Kingo Fujiuchi.)

Fujiwara finished the 75th Meijin Class C2 league (April 2016 – March 2017) with a record of 1 win and 9 losses, earning a third demotion point which meant automatic demotion to "Free Class" play.

On April 1, 2026, the JSA announced Fujiwara had met the conditions for mandatory retirement for "Free Class" players and his retirement would become official upon completion of his final scheduled game of the 2026–2027 shogi season. Fujiwara's retirement became official upon losing to Yoshikazu Minami on April 22, 2026, in a 39th Ryūō Group 6 game. He finished his career with a record of 486 wins and 566 losses for a winning percentage of 0.462.

=== Promotion history ===
The promotion history for Fujiwara was as follows:

- 6-kyū: 1979
- 1-dan: 1982
- 4-dan: April 1, 1989
- 5-dan: November 10, 1994
- 6-dan: July 24, 2001
- 7-dan: June 19, 2013
- Retired: April 22, 2026

=== Awards and honors ===
Fujiwara received the Japan Shogi Association's "25 Years Service Award" in 2013 for being an active professional for 25 years.

== Shogi journalist ==
Fellow Wakamatsu student Inoue says that Fujiwara's game score commentaries of professional games have always been well received, and that he even received offers of employment from some newspapers who published his reports when he was still an apprentice professional. Fujiwara has been filing reports and otherwise commentating on the Meijin title match and Meijin league play for the Mainichi Shinbun since the start of the 82nd Meijin League (2023–2024).
