= Akio Sato =

Akio Sato may refer to:

- Akio Sato (baseball)
- Akio Sato (politician, born 1927) (佐藤 昭夫; 1927–2007), Japanese Communist Party politician
- Akio Sato (politician, born 1943) (佐藤 昭郎), Japanese Liberal Democratic Party politician
- Akio Satō (politician, born 1952)
- Akio Sato (wrestler) (佐藤 昭雄; born 1953), Japanese professional wrestler
