= Akio Minakami =

Japanese karateka

Akio Minakami is a ninth Dan Karate practitioner of Hayashi-Ha Shitoryu-Kai, president of the United States Hayashi-ha Shitoryu-Kai, and a former professional martial arts competitor.

Born in Tokyo, Japan, he immigrated to the United States in 1967 with his parents.

His training in the martial arts began at the age of 7 under Takagi where he trained in Jujitsu and Kodokan Judo. At age 21 he was the first man to win both kata and kumite at the All Hawaii Championships. Other notable accomplishments include winning 5 gold medals each at the Hayashi-Ha Shitoryu-Kai International Championships, the All Japan Karate Championships, and the AAU National Championships.

Akio Minakami received his Shihan certificate in 1983 from both the Hayashi-Ha school and the Federation of All Japan Karatedo Organization. Shihan Minakami currently holds the following dan ranks in martial arts:

- 9th Dan, Karate, from Hayashi-Ha Shitoryu-Kai
- 7th Dan, Karate, from the Federation of All Japan Karatedo Organization
- 5th Dan, Chinen Yamanni ryu Bojutsu, under Ryukyu Bujutsu Kenkyu Doyukai (Known as RBKD)
- 3rd Dan, Kendo
- 1st Dan, Judo

In 1985 he founded the Minakami Karate Dojo in Seattle, Washington. Branches of the school are now located in Hawaii, Mexico and Europe. The Minakami Karate Dojo teaches kumite, kata, sai, bō (both Kenshin-ryū and Yamanni Ryu styles) and traditional Japanese dojo etiquette.
