= Akio Katayama =

Japanese historian

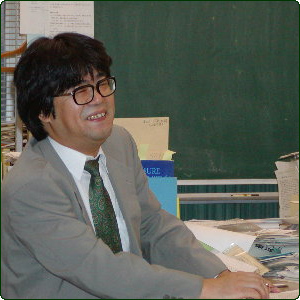
Akio Katayama

Prof. Akio Katayama (片山章雄) (born 1957, Hokkaido), a Japanese historian. He is a professor of Oriental History and Inner Asian Studies at Tokai University.

His research fields include Ancient Turkic inscriptions, Turfan documents, and Otani expeditions.

== Education and career ==
Katayama has been a professor at the History department in Tokai University Faculty of Letters since 1995. He holds a graduate degree from Sophia University's Graduate School of Letters (1985). His main research areas include Central Asian history, historical Chinese-Central Asia relations, and Turkic tribes of Central Asia. Between 2013 and 2014, he undertook a joint research project with Turkish historian Erdal Küçükyalçın (Japan Foundation fellow); titled "Otani Kozui's Life and Achievements (1876–1948)" (Japanese: 西本願寺第二十二門主・大谷光瑞の生涯（1876-1948）).

== Publications ==
- Kaikotsu tariato shine usu ryo hibun no tekisuto fukugen to nendaiki kara mita kita higashi chuou ajia (1994) ...『迴鶻タリアト・シネ=ウス両碑文のテキスト復原と年代記から見た北・東・中央アジア』
- Kindai ajia nihon kankei ni okeru Otani Kozui no ashiato shiryo no kisoteki seiri (1999)...『近代アジア・日本関係における大谷光瑞の足跡資料の基礎的整理』 （1999）
- Ryojun hakubutsukan syozo no Otani tankentai shorai Torufan shutsudo bukka bunsho (Tokai shigaku No. 42 2007)...「旅順博物館所蔵の大谷探検隊将来吐魯番出土物価文書」（『西北出土文献研究』第4 号、2007）
- Tachibana Zuicho no Rouran kinpen no tousa to kankei suru kiroku bunnmotsu (1) (Tokai shigaku No. 42 2008)...「橘瑞超の楼蘭近辺の踏査と関係する記録・文物（1）」（『東海史学』第42号、2008）
- Shinmatsu seiritsu no Shisen kara chibetto eno ruto wo kaita teitan ezu no kisoteki kenkyu, Yokohama no Rocho yori ushizo ni itaru teitan yozu to Pekin no Daruchendo e itaru ru-to no hikaku kenkyu...編集報告書：『清末成立の四川からチベットへのルートを描いた程站絵図の基礎的研究— 横浜の『自鑪庁至烏斯蔵程站輿図』と北京の『自打箭鑪至前後蔵途程図』の比較研究—』 （2008）
