= Akio Ishii (baseball) =

Japanese baseball player (born 1955)

Akio Ishii 石井 昭男
- Outfielder/Hitting coach
- Born: September 26, 1955 (age 70); Miura, Kanagawa, Japan
- Batted: Right Threw: Right

NPB debut
- August 24, 1978, for the Chunichi Dragons

Last NPB appearance
- 26 September, 1987, for the Chunichi Dragons

NPB statistics (through 1987)
- Games Played: 557
- Batting average: .226
- Home runs: 19
- RBI: 89
- Stats at Baseball Reference

Teams
- As player: Chunichi Dragons (1978–1987); As Coach: Chunichi Dragons (1988–1994, 1999–2001, 2018–2019); Yomiuri Giants (2023)

Akio Ishii (石井 昭男, Ishii Akio; born September 26, 1955) is a Japanese former professional baseball outfielder. He played for the Chunichi Dragons.

He is currently the second team hitting coach for the Chunichi Dragons in Japan's Nippon Professional Baseball.

== Career ==
Ishii was drafted out of Tokai University in the third round of the 1977 draft and has been a part of the Chunichi Dragons front and back office since his retirement in 1987.

On 28 September 2019, it was confirmed that Ishii would not be offered a contract as a coach for the 2020 season.
