= Akio Yasuraoka =

Japanese composer (born 1958)

- Born: January 13, 1958; Japan Tokyo
- Other name: 安良岡章夫
- Occupation: composer

Akio Yasuraoka (安良岡 章夫, Yasuraoka Akio) (born January 13, 1958) is a Japanese composer.

== Biography ==
Yasuraoka was born in Tokyo and studied with composers Teruyuki Noda (野田暉行) and Akira Miyoshi graduating Tokyo University of the Arts in 1984 with a master's degree in music composition. He has received several awards and distinctions including the 1st Prize in Composition at the Music Competition of Japan (日本音楽コンクール) in 1980 and the 1982 Japan Symphony Foundation Composition Award for his Symphony. He was recipient of the 1994 Kenzo Nakajima Music Award (中島健蔵音楽賞).

In 1985, Yasuraoka organized Art Respirant, a chamber orchestra of young performing artists and composers.

Currently Yasuraoka is professor at Toho Gakuen School of Music and Tokyo University of the Arts. He is a member of the 21st Century Music Association (21世紀音楽の会) and a director of the Japan Society for Contemporary Music (日本現代音楽協会).

== Selected works ==
The works of Yasuraoka are published by the Japan Federation of Composers, Zen-On Music, Ongaku-no-tomo Sha and Tokyo Academia Music.

Orchestra

- Symphony (1982)

Concertante

- Métamorphose concertante (協奏的変容) for Violin, Cello and Orchestra (1991)
- Concerto Grosso No.1 "Animatori" (1993)
- Polyphonia (ポリフォニア, Porifonia) for Viola and Orchestra (1995–1996)
- Antiphon for 25 Solo Strings (1996)

Chamber music

- Capriccio for Clarinet, Cello and Piano (1980)
- Projection for Violin and Piano (1984)
- Offrande (オフランド, Offering) for Viola Solo (1990)
- Fragment (断章, Danshō) for Solo Percussion (1992)
- Aria for Violin Solo (1992)
- Melodia (メロディア) for 4 Flutes (1993)
- Passaggio, Concertino for Marimba and 9 Instruments (1997)
- Gesto (ジェスト, Jesuto) for Harp Solo (2000)
- Aria Scomposta for Violin and Piano (2005)

Vocal

- Discantus (ディスカントゥス), Vocalise for Soprano, Violin, Cello and Piano (1994)
